= T. Ras Makonnen =

Guyanese-born Pan-African activist (1909–1983)

- Born: George Thomas N. Griffiths; 7 October 1909; Buxton, British Guyana
- Died: 18 December 1983 (aged 74); Nairobi, Kenya
- Citizenship: Kenya
- Education: Cornell University; Royal Agricultural College (Denmark); University of Manchester
- Occupations: Pan-African activist and journal editor
- Employer: Kenyan Ministry of Tourism
- Organization(s): YMCA; Brookwood Labor College; International African Friends of Ethiopia (IAFE); International African Service Bureau (IASB); International African Friends of Abyssinia (IAFA); Pan-African Federation (PAF); Pan-African Congress; Pan-Africa; International African Opinion (IAO); African Co-operative League; Organisation of African Unity
- Political party: Labour Party (UK)

T. Ras Makonnen (born George Thomas N. Griffiths; c. 7 October 1909 – 18 December 1983) was a Guyanese-born Pan-African activist and journal editor of Ethiopian descent.

== Early life and family ==
Makonnen was born George Thomas N. Griffiths in Buxton, British Guiana. His paternal grandfather was reputedly born in Tigre, Ethiopia, and was taken to British Guiana by a Scottish miner. Makonnen completed his secondary school in Guyana, before leaving in 1927 to study mineralogy in the United States of America.

During the Second Italo-Abyssinian War in 1935, Makonnen changed his name to emphasize his African roots. He became an integral part of the Pan-African movement in Britain and collaborated closely with George Padmore, C. L. R. James, Jomo Kenyatta, and others, to organise against the British Empire. His children are T'Shai R. Makonnen, Desta Makonnen, Lorenzo Makonnen and Sheba Makonnen.

== Life in the United States ==
In 1927, Makonnen went to Beaumont, Texas, where he wanted to study mineralogy. Shortly after his arrival in Texas he was drawn into YMCA activities through which he developed his solidarity with the African cause and laid the foundation for his repute as a gifted speaker. A part-time involvement with the YMCA in soon became a full-time post, which included establishing services for the Black population of the town, including services to businessmen – and even a brass band for the 60,000 Black workers of the Magnolia Petroleum Company. This resulted in speaking engagements around the US and attendance at YMCA international conferences. At one of these Griffith met Max Yergan, who had been a YMCA "missionary" in South Africa; this meeting was likely Griffith's introduction to Africa.

In 1932, Makonnen went north to attend Cornell University, where he briefly studied agriculture and worked in the university's library. Cornell's student body included a number of Ethiopians, with whom he discussed the looming Ethiopian crisis; It was at this time that the former Griffith changed his name to Makonnen. His holidays were spent in Harlem, New York City, where he participated in the agitation against high rents. Makonnen was friends with West Indians and Africans such as future Nigerian president Nnamdi Azikiwe during this period, and with them formed the Libyan Institute, where the members "read learned papers on aspects of Africa". Makonnen also listened on the street corners and at other meetings to Black socialists and communists, including George Padmore, "but never became a party man; [though] I borrowed a lot from them". Makonnen lent his energies to the Brookwood Labor College, working on "a primer on American history and a dictionary of terms essential to the workers' movement".

Makonnen's reading, to judge by his memoirs, was broad; it is known, for example, that he and Jomo Kenyatta visited Jamaican-born Theophilus Scholes to thank him for the great stimulus they had derived from reading his books, which were critical studies of African history and the diaspora. Makonnen was actively engaged in the raging debates of those days on the comparative merits of the views of W. E. B. Du Bois and Marcus Garvey. Makonnen's collaboration with George Padmore, then Malcolm Nurse; a nephew of Henry Sylvester Williams, also dates from this period. At Cornell, he continued his activities as a champion of the cause of Black people. He learnt from men like the economist Scott Nearing and the anthropologist Franz Boas. His brief flirtation with the radical American left during this period, drew in his own words, jocular remarks from Azikiwe and Ugandan Ernest Kalibala, who were also in America around that time. A good number of his generation got their early political education from associations on the left of the political spectrum.

== Life in Europe ==
=== Denmark ===
In 1935, Makonnen moved to Europe. It was during a brief visit in London, en route to Denmark where he met and shared a platform with C. L. R. James and Jomo Kenyatta at a meeting in Trafalgar Square on the Ethiopian crisis organised by the International African Friends of Ethiopia (IAFE). It was around this time that Benito Mussolini unravelled his designs on Ethiopia that the young Griffiths changed his name to Makonnen, when he was part of a delegation, that included Jomo Kenyatta and I. T. A. Wallace-Johnson; to welcome Emperor Haile Selassie to the City of Bath.

Together with people like Makonnen Desta, Peter Mbiyu Koinange, Workineh Martin and others, Makonnen worked to publicise the Ethiopian crisis. Makonnen went to the Royal Agricultural College in Copenhagen, Denmark. After about 18 months, Makonnen was deported from Denmark for suggesting that the mustard sold by Denmark to Italy was being used in the manufacture of the mustard gas being used in the Italian invasion of Ethiopia.

=== United Kingdom ===
On the boat he met Paul Robeson, who had then left America and was establishing a name for himself at the Unity Theatre in London. Makonnen subsequently settled in London in 1937. He became an active member of the International African Service Bureau (IASB) that had formed under George Padmore's leadership. Writing about Makonnen's role in the Bureau, historian Carol Polsgrove presents him as the group's business manager, selling its journal, Pan Africa, at political meetings and handling the bills.

In London, Makonnen became a founder member of the first attempt to form a Pan-African Federation in mid-1936, which brought together representatives from North, South, East and West Africa, and the Caribbean. Makonnen naturally also became involved with the International African Friends of Abyssinia (IAFA), which was chaired by C. L. R. James; one of its leading members was Jomo Kenyatta. After the Italian conquest of Abyssinia, IAFA transformed itself into the International African Service Bureau (IASB), under the chairmanship of Padmore, with Makonnen as "executive and publicity secretary". Makonnen drafted the constitution. According to historian Jack Bowman, Makonnen was central to the IASB's success, spearheading the use of journals within the movement.

The IASB stood for "the progress and social advancement of Africans at home and abroad; full economic, political and racial equality; and for self-determination". The Bureau aimed to "co-ordinate and centralize" Black organisations around the world and link them "in closer fraternal relations" with one another, and with "sympathetic" White organisations. Membership of the IASB was restricted to Blacks, but Whites could become associate members. The office of the IASB, which was administered and funded through the efforts of Makonnen, was a "regular mecca for all revolutionaries from all the colonies and a rendezvous for the Left"; it also provided a place to stay for colonials. "[Makonnen] did a colossal job", C. L. R. James wrote: "he cooked, and cleaned the place himself … [And] he was no mean agitator himself."

The IASB was in touch with colonial organisations such as the Gold Coast Aborigines Rights Protection Society, which solicited its support for its 1935 petition regarding monopolistic control of cocoa exports. It organised various protest meetings in Trafalgar Square and sent speakers, including Makonnen, as far afield as Belfast and Scotland. On the Sunday platforms at Speakers' Corner in Hyde Park, Makonnen and other IASB speakers drew a crowd by using Prince Monolulu – an early funder for the IASB – as the first speaker. Monolulu, who earned an occasionally lucrative living as a race-course tipster, had a "kind of Rasputin tone [and] traded in subtle vulgarity of a high order". Makonnen himself is described by Nkrumah as a "gifted speaker". There, and at left-wing and other meetings, Makonnen assiduously sold the IASB's newspaper.

After the outbreak of World War II, Makonnen moved to Manchester, where he studied history at the University of Manchester. True to his entrepreneurial spirit, he opened four restaurants and an exclusive nightclub, all of which did exceptionally well, especially after the arrival of US, especially African American, troops in the area during the war. He also opened a bookshop which catered to the students at the nearby University of Manchester, and eventually owned a number of houses which he let to Black people. The profits from these businesses went towards his political work. The most significant of these efforts was the Fifth Pan African Congress and the allied Pan Africa publication. His fraternity with Kwame Nkrumah, Peter Abrahams, Nathaniel Fadipe and Du Bois also developed during this period.

During this period, Makonnen continued to be active in the IASB and, along with George Padmore and Nkrumah, helped organize the fifth Pan-African Congress in 1945. He also hosted visitors from Africa and opened a bookstore and a mail-order book service. In 1947 he started a new publication, Pan-Africa, which he hoped would be "a reflection of the everyday life and deeds of the African people". He distributed it across Africa and the Americas, but it was hard to collect fees, and in some places bookstores and subscribers were nervous about being seen with what was then, under colonial rule, a publication that critiqued the governance of European powers. The periodical ceased publication the year after it began. During the post-war years, Makonnen worked with members of the Somali Youth League in Britain to improve Somali-Ethiopia relations. Makonnen was one of the last people to see Kenyatta before he left Britain to return to Kenya. Makonnen's political contacts and activities also included work with the Sudanese Umma Party and particular with Abdalla Khalil Bey and Mohammed Majoub.

In July 1937, the Bureau had begun to publish a duplicated paper, Africa and the World, whose 14 August 1937 (and apparently final) issue noted that Makonnen had been among the speakers at a Trafalgar Square meeting regarding the situation in the West Indies, where there was widespread agitation for civil and trade union rights. He also spoke to peace groups, on socialist labour platforms, and to the Left Book Club. By 1938 seemingly enough money had been raised not only to publish a printed monthly paper, International African Opinion (IAO) but also a number of pamphlets which were sold in Britain and sent surreptitiously overseas to colleagues in the West Indies and East and West Africa. In its February–March 1939 issue, IAO published an article by Makonnen entitled "A plea for Negro self-government", which analysed the economic systems everywhere and advised "African peoples of the West to aim in political philosophy and corresponding action at the establishment of the complete economic, social and political control of their own destinies". IAO was soon banned in East Africa.

The life of IAO was as brief as that of its predecessor: the final issue was published in February–March 1939. However, the IASB did not cease publishing: the treasurer raised enough money to continue publishing pamphlets, whose authors included Kenyatta and Eric Williams. Makonnen served as an advisory editor.

Makonnen also furthered his interests in the cooperative movement by studying at the Co-operative College in 1939–40 and lecturing on the movement to local organisations. He then also became an active member of the local Labour Party and was even invited to speak at the prestigious County Forum. At about this time he formed the African Co-operative League with Sierra Leonean Laminah Sankoh, which he wanted to link "with our traditional African form of co-operation", in the hope of replacing the capitalist economy then prevalent among Africans.

The Pan-African Federation (PAF) was re-formed in Manchester in 1944 under the presidency of Dr Peter Milliard, a politically active physician of British Guianese origins; Makonnen was the secretary. The PAF organised a Pan-African Congress, convened in Manchester in July 1945, with delegates and representatives from the Black world. The principal political organiser of the Congress was Padmore, assisted by the recently arrived Francis (Kwame) Nkrumah. In order to maintain continuity with previous Congresses, W. E. B. DuBois, who had called four of them, was invited to chair the Manchester Congress. "One important thing that came out of the Congress", Makonnen believed, was "that the struggle was not to be found in Europe for the majority of us. The old idea that you could do more work for liberation outside Africa was being laid aside". Both Nkrumah and Kenyatta were soon to return to Africa. At the Congress Makonnen had spoken about Ethiopia, supporting its territorial claims on the Tigray Region.

In mid-1946 Makonnen began to advertise the "Panaf Service" as "importers and exporters, publishers, booksellers, printers, and manufacturers' representatives", based at his premises at 58 Oxford Road, Manchester, which was also the PAF's home. Profits from these new activities went to finance the PAF, which maintained old contacts and made new ones with political groups and activists in Africa and the Caribbean whose concerns were publicised and whose delegations to Britain were helped when possible. The PAF attempted to break down "clannish" and tribal divisions both in Europe and Africa, which Makonnen felt were "obstacles to pan-Africanism" (ibid., p. 190). It also organised many political meetings, for example supporting the 1945 strike in Nigeria and celebrating the centenary of Liberian independence. The PAF set up an Asiatic-African United Front Committee to foster cooperation between all "subject peoples" and attempted to set up a Pan-African Committee in Paris.

The PAF Secretary, after holding a meeting on the issue and consulting widely (for example with Kobina Sekyi of the Aborigines' Rights Protection Society in the Gold Coast, with whom Makonnen and the PAF had a long relationship), sent a memorandum to the United Nations (UN) about the appointment of Barbadian Grantley Adams to the Trusteeship Council. Makonnen questioned the UN about the appointment, as the Ghanaian people had not been consulted about it; and Adams had not consulted them about the stance he should take on issues affecting them.

The PAF also got involved in the ever-increasing racial tensions in the UK. For example, it – or Makonnen – stood bail for Black seamen accused of mutiny in Plymouth. As the PAF had little faith in white barristers, in 1946 it raised the funds to bring the eminent Jamaican Norman Manley to Britain to defend a Jamaican airman accused of murder. The man was later acquitted. In 1948 it demanded a government investigation of the race riots which had taken place in Liverpool. Makonnen himself corresponded with the city's mayor and obtained an interview with the chief constable. Always using his profits to help his fellow Blacks, Makonnen gave £5,000 to the founding of a home for the abandoned children fathered by Black servicemen with White women who did not want to keep their mixed-race children.

Makonnen maintained his involvement with Ethiopia which had begun with the campaigns against the 1935 invasion. He had helped to organise the exiled Emperor Menelik's retinue. Post-war, he raised funds for the Princess Tsehai Memorial Hospital. In 1946, Makonnen supported the pro-Ethiopia campaigns organised by Sylvia Pankhurst, for example for the restoration of Eritrea and Somalia to Ethiopia. At this 19 June meeting he argued that the problems of Africa were "attributable to Europe’s master-race principle".

In 1947, Makonnen began to publish Pan-Africa, a "monthly journal of African life, history and thought". He was its publisher and managing editor; the editor was Dinah Stock; Padmore, Kenyatta and Nkrumah were among the associate and contributing editors. The journal sought and attracted articles from and readership in the colonised world as well as the USA. By October 1947, the Belgian Government banned the journal from the Belgian Congo; within another few months it was banned by the East African colonial governments as "seditious." This loss of readership resulted in the journal's demise in early 1948. Though no copies have remained, it appears that the journal also published news-releases (which reached, for example, the Gold Coast) and a copy of the petition to the UN, "Statement on the Denial of Human Rights to Minorities in the Case of Citizens of Negro Descent in the USA". The journal, also funded by Makonnen, was based at 58 Oxford Road.

Having "no ties with Guyana", and as "all my travelling … was to get knowledge to prepare me for working in the West Indies or Africa."

== Life in Africa ==
In 1957, Makonnen emigrated to Ghana. As he had been very critical of Nkrumah in 1948, because of Nkrumah's pro-communist associates in London, this move either indicated a change of perception, or hopes induced by Padmore's presence there. Makonnen joined Nkrumah and Padmore there and helped to found the Organisation of African Unity. Initially in Ghana, he worked with Padmore as an Adviser on African Affairs, subsequently moving to the newly established African Affairs Center as Director. It was in this capacity that he came into contact with Jomo, Lumumba, Kaunda, Roberto, Banda and other leaders of African opinion.

Makonnen was arrested following a coup in Ghana in 1966 and spent time in prison before his release was secured by Kenyatta, who had been an IASB colleague in Britain. Makonnen then worked for the Kenyan Ministry of Tourism and became a citizen of Kenya in 1969. In Kenya, Makonnen offered counsel and comfort to the South African community exiled there and forged friendships with men including Peter Nkutsoeu Raboroko, a founding member of Pan-African Congress (PAC) and members of the African National Congress (ANC).

Kenneth King, a professor at the University of Nairobi, interviewed Makonnen over nine months and organized the content of the interviews into a book that described Makonnen's political life, Pan-Africanism from Within (1973).

== Final years and legacy ==
In his final years, Makonnen became increasingly perturbed with the general results of independence, especially African unity, which remained elusive. Too often he felt that excessive materialism, pomp and circumstance had become overriding preoccupations of independent Africa.

Makonnen died in Nairobi in 1983, aged 74.

== Bibliography ==
- Makonnen, Ras; Kenneth King (1973). Pan-Africanism from Within. Oxford University Press. ISBN 978-0-19-572018-1.
- Polsgrove, Carol. Ending British Rule in Africa: Writers in a Common Cause. Manchester: Manchester University Press, 2009.
- Adi, Hakim, and Marika Sherwood. Pan-African History: Political Figures from Africa and the Diaspora since 1787. Routledge, 2003.
