= Akunna =

Nigerian given name

- Gender: Female
- Language: Igbo

Origin
- Meaning: Father's wealth
- Region of origin: Southeastern Nigeria

Akunna (audio) is a female given name of Igbo origin. It means "father's wealth".

== Notable people with this name ==
- Isaac Theophilus Akunna Wallace-Johnson (Born 1894), Trade unionist, activist, journalist and politician
