= International African Friends of Abyssinia =

Political organization established in 1935 in London

The International African Friends of Abyssinia (IAFA), also known as the International African Friends of Ethiopia, was an organisation established in 1935 in London, England, to protest against Italian aggression against Abyssinia (see Second Italo-Ethiopian War). Its membership was composed of many important Pan-African figures, several of whom later formed the International African Service Bureau.

== History ==
The International African Friends of Abyssinia (IAFA) was founded by C. L. R. James with assistance from fellow West Indians Amy Ashwood Garvey and Chris Braithwaite. IAFA's first public meeting was held on 23 July 1935, with another public meeting taking place days later on Sunday, 28 July, at Memorial Hall in Farringdon Street, London, and was widely reported in newspapers. George Padmore and Ras Makonnen joined IAFA soon after its founding. Throughout the summer of 1935, the IAFA passed resolutions urging all Africans and people of African descent to help Abyssinia and called upon the League of Nations and the British Government to protect Abyssinia. On 26 August, the IAFA organised a rally in Trafalgar Square which drew a crowd of nearly five hundred supporters.

== Notable members ==
Members of the initial executive committee of the International African Friends of Abyssinia included:

- C. L. R. James – Chairman
- Dr Peter Milliard and T. Albert Marryshow – Vice-Chairmen
- Jomo Kenyatta – Honorary Secretary
- Amy Ashwood Garvey – Honorary Treasurer
- Sam Manning
- Mohammed Said
- G. E. Moore
- S. R. Wood
- Dr J. B. Danquah
- John Payne

Other leading members came to include George Padmore, Chris Braithwaite and T. Ras Makonnen.
