= Desmond Buckle =

Ghanaian activist (1910–1964)

- Born: 29 March 1910; Accra, Gold Coast (present day Ghana)
- Died: 25 October 1964 (aged 54); London, England
- Occupations: Political activist, journalist, trade unionist

James Desmond Buckle (29 March 1910 – 25 October 1964) was a political activist, journalist, trade unionist and Communist born in the British colony of the Gold Coast (present-day Ghana). Described as "an African communist in Britain", he may have been the first African to join the British Communist Party.

== Early life and family ==
James Desmond Buckle was born on 29 March 1910 to Vidal James Buckle and Ellen Konadu Buckle in Accra in the Gold Coast (present-day Ghana). Born into the local elite, Buckle's parents were both educated in Britain, and he received a very privileged childhood, even by British standards at the time. His father, Vidal James Buckle, was a wealthy lawyer and his mother, Ellen Konadu Buckle, was a member of the prominent Bannerman family. His mother was a descendant of James Bannerman, a British merchant who served as the governor of the Gold Coast in the 1850s. Buckle's grandfather was Sir James Buckle, a well-to-do merchant who traded between Freetown in Sierra Leone and Accra in the Gold Coast. Sir James Buckle was married into the prominent Sierra Leone Creole Palmer family, whose descendants were of African origin in the West Indies. Desmond Buckle's ancestry traces back to the Sierra Leone Creole, who returned to West Africa after undergoing enslavement in the United States. Buckle was born the second of five children.

In 1920, his father died at the age of 33, when Desmond was just 10 years old. Following this, Ellen Buckle sent all her children to Britain to boarding-school. Desmond was sent to Truro College in Cornwall. During this time his relationship with his mother deteriorated, as he wished to complete his studies in the Gold Coast while his mother wished for him to study in Britain, a common practice for many wealthy families in the Gold Coast at the time. Desmond's younger brother's death of pneumonia in London was also a factor in Desmond's desire to return to the Gold Coast. His relationship with his family was essentially severed until the 1960s, in which he was reunited with them in London. Initially this rift was due to concerns over education, but later Desmond's affiliation with communism shocked his predominantly bourgeois family. At the age of 18 in 1928, Buckle began to study medicine at University College London but was unable to finish his studies due to a lack of financial support from the government and family.

== Political activism ==
Buckle has been described by comrades as a "Lifelong fighter for colonial freedom" and was well renowned among African and West Indian revolutionaries. Despite not being well known in the public sphere, Buckle's activism was internationally recognised. At the time of Buckle's death, the then President of Nigeria, Nnamdi Azikiwe, sent a message to his funeral stating that Buckle was someone who "passionately believed in human freedom and devoted his life to its realization, not only in Africa but in all corners of the earth".

=== Work with the Gold Coast Students' Association ===
During the 1930s Buckle began to become involved in student and black political organizations, including the League of Coloured Peoples (LCP) and the Gold Coast Students' Association (GCSA). The GCSA was a West African student organization formed in London in the mid 1920s, alongside other West African student organisations such as the West African Students' Union (WASU). Through the GSCA, Buckle became heavily involved in the politics of the time. Buckle greatly opposed the Sedition placed upon the Gold Coast and supporting the views of African politicians arriving in Britain to oppose such restrictions. Buckle also supported the 1937–1938 Gold Coast "cocoa hold-up", in which a coalition of farmers on the Gold Coast refused to sell their cocoa produce to large trading firms. On occasion the GCSA was antagonistic to the WASU on various issues Buckle was involved in, such as the dispute over Aggrey House. At this time the GCSA viewed the WASU not as an organisation that represented West African students, but as one dominated by Nigerians. Buckle gave his support of Aggrey House, a hostel designed for African students, being part of the GCSA delegation that helped establish its rules in 1934. The WASU, on the contrary, saw the house as a means for the British Government to control African students. Buckle was a prominent member of the GCSA, being appointed as its secretary from 1936 to 1937 and its president in 1937–38. During this time Buckle's radicalism increased, with him proposing the notion "this Association refuses to fight for the British Empire" at a GCSA debate in October 1937. The next month Buckle was the primary opponent of the motion "that the salvation of the Gold Coast lies in close cooperation with the British Labour Party", showing his refusal to cooperate with British Imperialism.

Around this time, Buckle worked in collaboration with the Negro Welfare Association (NWA), a Black British organization founded in 1931, and was affiliated with the International Trade Union Committee of Negro Workers (ITUCNW) and the League Against Imperialism (LAI). The NWA helped organise field trips for black children, while also campaigning for trade unions in the Caribbean and opposing the colour bar in Britain. In December 1938, Buckle helped organize a joint meeting between the GCSA, the NWA, the Communist Party of Great Britain (CPGB) and the London Federation of Peace Councils titled "Colonies and Peace". The British historian Hakim Adi claims that it is likely that Buckle was exposed to communism and the CPGB through his work with the NWA. Buckle encouraged collaboration between the GCSA and the NWA, calling members of the GCSA to be more involved in the concerns of black people's welfare and asking for donations to the NWA. He also helped invite NWA secretary Arnold Ward to speak to the GSWA in April 1939.

=== Communism and the Communist Party of Great Britain ===
In July 1939 Buckle, was one of the major organizers on a conference called "African Peoples, Democracy and World Peace". This was organized by the NWA, CPGB and the Coloured Film Artistes Association. Around this time Buckle became "intellectually convinced" by the values of the Communist Party which he had joined in 1937.

Regardless of background, African students, like Buckle, were subject to being treated as second class citizens in Britain, often facing verbal racial abuse and discrimination. These experiences caused many African students to become radicalized, causing them to be inspired to organise against racism and colonialism. The Colonial Office referred to these radical tendencies as "subversive influences" and they were concerned that African and other colonial students would come under the influence of communists, who were some of the most vocal opponents of colonialism. To counter these influences, the Colonial Office held files on several West African students, including Buckle, and put them in contact with the Victoria League, an organization which looked to introduce said students to respectable families in Britain. The Colonial Office started to become concerned with Buckle's radical ideas in Aggrey House, which was described as a "center for subversion and definitely anti-allied propaganda". To suppress these movements, the closure of Aggrey House was proposed, resulting in Buckle leading a protest in opposition. From this, the Colonial Office concluded that Desmond Buckle and Peter Blackman were the cause of these problems and should be monitored. As a member of the CPGB, Buckle was a concern for the British Government.

Buckle worked as a journalist for the CPGB, specialising in African affairs and colonialism. This skills in writing were swiftly observed, and he was a member of the CPGB's Colonial Committee by 1943. In 1947 and 1949, he presented reports on Africa and the West Indies at conferences for the Communist Parties of nations under the British Empire. Buckle's reports were anti-capitalist and anti-colonialist, linking the hardships under colonialism with the international struggle against Capitalism. Regarding liberation, Buckle proposed that colonies striving for independence must dispose of monopolies in order to "advance to real freedom". In the 1949 conference, Buckle again critiques "monopoly capitalism" as being a major obstacle in the development of colonies. He also made clear the importance of the World Federation of Trade Unions (WFTU).

Buckle was a member of the CPGB's International Affairs Committee (IAC) and secretary of the Africa Committee, a subsect of the IAC. This subsect helped with anti-colonial movements in Africa and also working with Africans in Britain. From 1950 to 1954 he was the editor of the Africa Newsletter, the committee's journal. As a journalist in the CPGB Buckle also frequently made contributions to other journals of the CPGB such as the Daily Worker and Labour Monthly. Buckle remained in the CPGB for the rest of his life. Despite his separation from his family in West Africa, Buckle appeared to have found a new "home" and "family" in the international communist movement and the CPGB.

=== Other forms of activism ===
Buckle was also part of various anti-racist movements in Britain as well as being part of trade union and peace movements internationally, with connections to the Pan-African movement in Britain. Buckle was a member of the Committee for West Indian Affairs, a committee formed by Labour MPs David Adams and Ben Riley, in the wake of workers' struggles in the Caribbean. Buckle also worked with the National Council for Civil Liberties (NCCL), giving speeches at their conferences, focussing on colonial struggles in Africa and issues of racism in Britain. In 1949, Buckle was heavily involved with the NCCL's defence of 14 Africans who had been arrested for defending themselves against a racist attack in Deptford. Buckle's speech, at a conference organized by the NCCL and other local councils in Deptford, highlighted not only the physical violence placed upon Africans but also the "murder of the spirit" Africans face by being placed into hostile, racist environments. Buckle then goes on to say: "I feel that we should work legislation on the question; that discrimination against anyone because of his colour, race or creed should be punishable by law."

Post World War Two, Buckle's activism was mainly concerning trade union movements across the world and working towards international peace. In 1945, at the WFTU's founding in Paris, Buckle represented the Transvaal Council of Non-European Trade Unions, advocating for the involvement of Non-European workers in South Africa in the organisation. Following this, Buckle was part of the WFTU's general council. Buckle lead work in the Pan-African Trade Union Congress, facing resistance from the French Government in 1951. Buckle continued to represent the Non-Europeans of South Africa in Paris, Prague and Rome assemblies of the World Congress of Partisans for Peace in 1949. Buckle defended the exploited peoples in South Africa and publicly denounced the Apartheid regime that the then President of South Africa, Daniel François Malan, was running. Buckle accused Malan of crimes against humanity and labelled the regime as fascist and a danger to world peace. Buckle also pointed out the western involvement in such a system, highlighting the importance that Western control over African resources and materials was necessary to maintain Western Imperialism during the Cold War. Buckle therefore deemed world peace as essential to end such exploitation of African peoples, calling for the World Congress of Partisans for Peace to have a conference about achieving world peace, in London or Paris (the Capitals of the most powerful European nations at the time). Buckle was also a member of the Permanent Committee of the World Peace Congress and was elected to the presidium of the Second World Peace Congress, held in Warsaw in 1950.

Buckle continued his journalism working for the Czechoslovak News Agency, as well as the Telegraph Agenecy of the Soviet Union (TASS), focusing his journalism on sport and African affairs. He also wrote for several East German journals: Tägliche Rundshau, Neue Berliner Illustrieterte and Zeit im Bild. Buckle also worked closely with American musician and political activist Paul Robeson. Buckle worked as Robeson's secretary during Robeson's four-month spell in Britain in 1949.

== Death ==
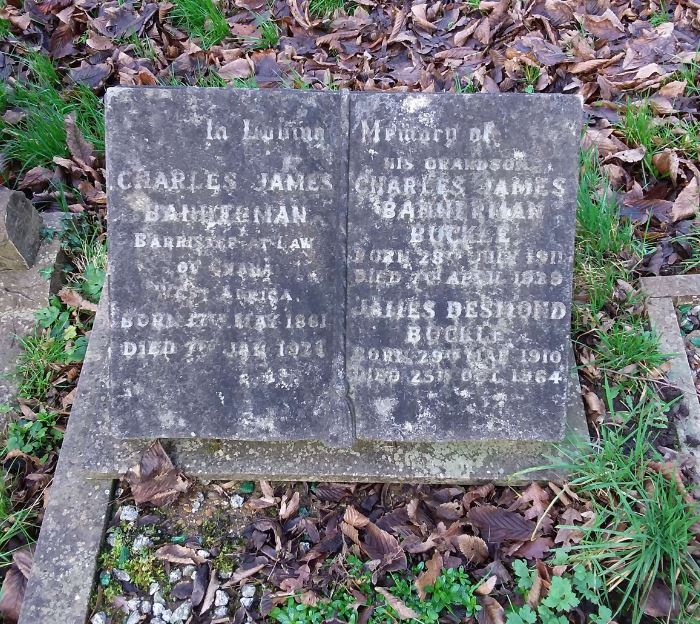
Grave of Desmond Buckle in Highgate Cemetery

Buckle died of stomach cancer at St George's Hospital in London, aged 54, and his ashes were buried at Highgate Cemetery.

== Publications ==
- Imperialist Terror in Kenya, published by World News (1952)
- Africa in Ferment, published by The Trinity Trust (1953)
- "Africa in Ferment" by Desmond Buckle, pp. 19–22, Labour Monthly, January 1953
- "Civil Liberty in the Empire", Labour Monthly (1941)
- "North Africa Shakes France", Labour Monthly, April 1958, pp. 175–179
- "Colour Bar." World News and Views, November 1942, pp. 453–454
