= Negro Welfare Association =

Black British organization during the 1930s

The Negro Welfare Association (NWA) was one of the most prominent Black British organizations in the 1930s. Calling "for the complete liberation and independence of all Negroes who are suffering from capitalist exploitation and imperialist domination", the NWA campaigned on both British and international issues, such as the cause of the Scottsboro Boys.

The NWA was founded in London in 1931, by activists including the Barbadian Arnold Ward. It was affiliated to the British section of the League Against Imperialism and the International Trade Union Committee of Negro Workers. Several of its white members were close to the Communist Party, including Reginald Bridgeman, Hugo Rathbone, Ben Bradley and Nancy Cunard. Its leading black activists were Arnold Ward and Peter Blackman from Barbados, and Desmond Buckle and Rowland Sawyer from West Africa. The former dockworker Chris Braithwaite, who ran the Colonial Seaman's Association, served on the NWA's executive committee. Jomo Kenyatta and Isaac Wallace-Johnson were also NWA members.

In 1935 the NWA adopted a new constitution, requiring all its leadership to be black. Under the leadership of Peter Blackman and Desmond Buckle, it actively supported Caribbean labour rebellions in the late 1930s.

The NWA disbanded in at some point during the Second World War.
