= Fadipe =

Nigerian given name

- Gender: Male
- Language: Yoruba

Origin
- Origin: Nigeria
- Meaning: Ifá repaid.
- Region of origin: South West, Nigeria

Fadipe is a Nigerian male given name and surname of Yoruba origin. It means "Ifá repaid". and is common among Yoruba ifa (Oracle) believers.

Notable people with the surname include:

- Nathaniel Fadipe (1893–1944), Nigerian researcher
- Kehinde Fadipe (born 1983), British-Nigerian actress and writer
