= United States of Africa =

Political concept similar to the hypothesised United States of Europe

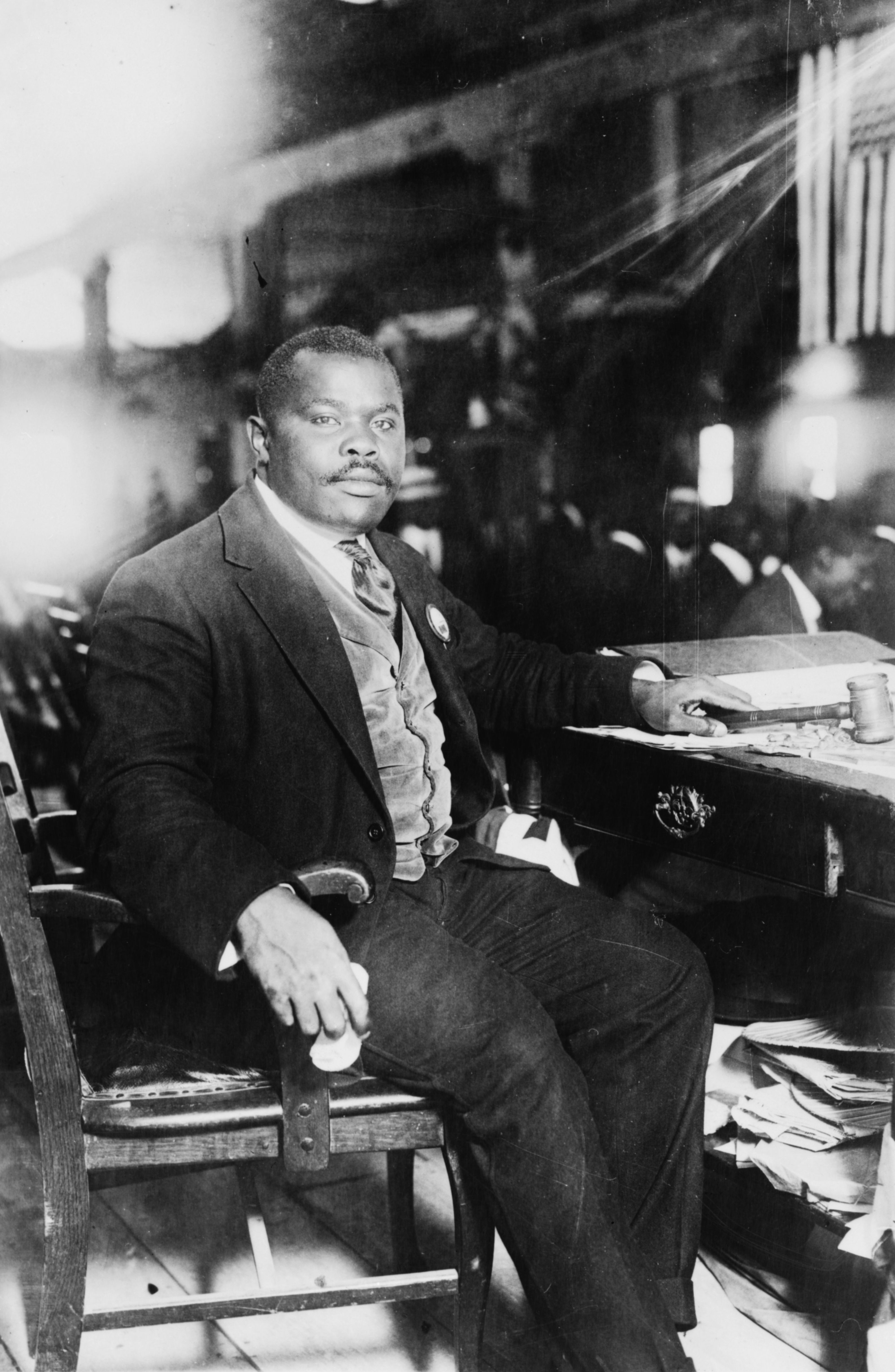
Marcus Garvey in 1924

The United States of Africa is a concept of a federation of some or all of the 54 sovereign states and two disputed states on the continent of Africa. The concept takes its origin from Marcus Garvey's 1924 poem "Hail, United States of Africa". Kwame Nkrumah was the most prominent African political leader who passionately championed the idea of a Union of African States with a unified African Government, similar to the United States of America, as he envisioned an African government that could drive the continent forward.

== Origins ==
The idea of a multinational unifying African state has been compared to various medieval African empires, including the Ethiopian Empire, the Ghana Empire, the Mali Empire, the Songhai Empire, the Benin Empire, the Kanem Empire and other historic nation states. During the late 19th and early 20th century the majority of African land was controlled by various European empires, with the British controlling around 30 percent of the African population at its peak.

The term "United States of Africa" was mentioned first by Marcus Garvey in his poem Hail, United States of Africa in 1924. Garvey's ideas and formation systems deeply influenced former Africa leaders and the rebirth of the African Union.

=== Kwame Nkrumah proposal ===
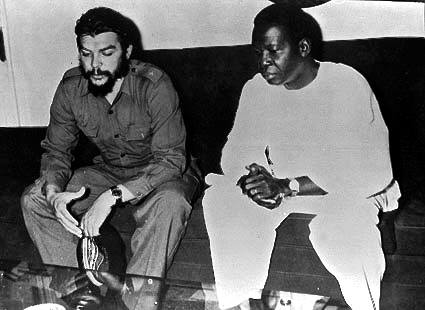
Nkrumah with Ernesto "Che" Guevara, January 1965

Between 1957 and 1966, Kwame Nkrumah, the first President of Ghana, was a strong advocate for the creation of a Union of African States with a common African government. Guided by Pan-African ideals, Nkrumah believed that for Africa to truly achieve independence and development, its nations needed to unite both politically and economically.

The All-African Peoples Conference, held in Accra, Ghana in 1958, marked a significant moment in the history of Pan-Africanism. Organized by Nkrumah and George Padmore, a Trinidadian writer and activist whom Nkrumah had appointed as his Advisor on African Affairs, the conference gathered representatives from across Africa and its diaspora and was the first time such an event had taken place on African soil, making it a pivotal occasion for Nkrumah to present his ambitious vision: the creation of a United States of Africa.

However, his proposal faced strong resistance from other African leaders, who feared losing their sovereignty, as well as from Western powers, who opposed it due to their own vested interests.

=== 2009–2011 proposals ===
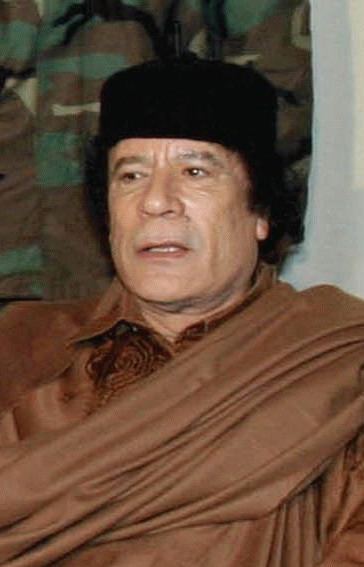
Muammar al-Gaddafi in 2003

In February 2009, upon being elected chairman of the 53-nation African Union in Ethiopia, Muammar Gaddafi told the assembled African leaders: "I shall continue to insist that our sovereign countries work to achieve the United States of Africa." The BBC reported that Gaddafi had proposed "a single African military force, a single currency and a single passport for Africans to move freely around the continent". Other African leaders stated they would study the proposal's implications, and re-discuss it in May 2009.

The focus for developing the United States of Africa so far has been on building subdivisions of Africa - the proposed East African Federation can be seen as an example of this. Former President of Senegal, Abdoulaye Wade, had in 2011 indicated that the United States of Africa could exist as early as 2017. The African Union, by contrast, has set itself the task of building a "united and integrated" Africa by 2025. Gaddafi had also indicated that the proposed federation may extend as far west as the Caribbean: Haiti, Jamaica, the Dominican Republic, the Bahamas and other islands featuring a large African diaspora, may be invited to join.

Gaddafi also received criticism for his involvement in the movement, and lack of support for the idea from among other African leaders. A week before Gaddafi's death during the Libyan Civil War, South African President Jacob Zuma expressed relief at the regime's downfall, complaining that Gaddafi had been "intimidating" many African heads of state and government in an effort to gain influence throughout the continent and suggesting that the African Union will function better without Gaddafi and his repeated proposals for a unitary African government.

Gaddafi was ultimately killed during the Battle of Sirte in October 2011. While some regard the project to have died with him, Robert Mugabe expressed interest in reviving the project. However, before any fruition of the project, Mugabe resigned as President following the 2017 Zimbabwean coup d'état. On 6 September 2019, Mugabe died.

== National views ==
All African states are members of the African Union.

The governments of Ghana, Senegal, and Zimbabwe have supported an African federation. Others such as South Africa, Kenya, and Nigeria have been more skeptical, feeling that the continent is not ready for unification. North African countries such as Algeria, Morocco, Egypt, Tunisia, and Libya (which have traditionally identified more with rival ideologies like Pan-Arabism, Arab nationalism, Berberism and Islamism) have shown less interest in the idea.

Doubts have been raised about whether the goal of a unified Africa can ever be achieved because of the many languages being spoken and of the many religions followed, and ongoing problems of corruption, conflict, tribalism, civil unrest, and poverty persisting throughout the continent and continuing to plague the people.

== Demographics ==
The proposed federation would have the largest total territory of any state, exceeding the Russian Federation. It would also be the most populous state surpassing India and China, and with a population speaking an estimated 2,000 languages.

== In fiction ==
In the fictional Star Trek universe, the United States of Africa exist as part of the United Earth Government. Commander Nyota Uhura hails from Kenya, within the United States of Africa; Geordi La Forge's home city, Mogadishu in Somalia, is in the African Confederation (it is unknown whether they are intended to be the same organization).

In the fictional Halo universe, the United States of Africa exist as a nation of the Unified Earth Government, within the United Nations Space Command.

Arthur C. Clarke's 1987 science fiction novel 2061: Odyssey Three features the formation of a United States of Southern Africa.

The 2006 French-Beninese film Africa Paradis is set in the United States of Africa in the year 2033.

The 1990s cartoon Bots Master has a United States of Africa, and its President is one of the few people who believe that Ziv "ZZ" Zulander is not a terrorist.

In Kodwo Eshun's Further Considerations on Afrofuturism (2003), a team of United States of Africa (USAF) archaeologists from the future attempt to reconstruct 20th-century Afrodiasporic subjectivity through a comparative study of various cultural media and artefacts.

== See also ==
- African Union – Continental union of African states
- Arab Union – Theoretical political union of Arab states
- Demographics of Africa
- Federal Europe – Speculative future European federation
- Organisation of African Unity – African international body (1963–2002)
- Pan-African Parliament – International parliament
- United States of Latin Africa – Proposed union of Romance-language-speaking Central African countries
- Universal Negro Improvement Association and African Communities League – Black nationalist fraternal organization
- World government – Notion of a single common political authority for all of humanity
