= International African Service Bureau =

Pan-African organisation founded in 1937

The International African Service Bureau (I.A.S.B.) was a pan-African organisation founded in London in 1937 by West Indians George Padmore, C. L. R. James, Amy Ashwood Garvey, T. Ras Makonnen, Kenyan nationalist Jomo Kenyatta and Sierra Leonean labour activist and agitator I. T. A. Wallace-Johnson. Chris Braithwaite (also known as Jones), was Secretary of this organisation.

== Origins ==
The I.A.S.B. emerged from the International African Friends of Abyssinia (Ethiopia) and intended to address issues relating to Africa and the African diaspora to the British general public. Similar in design and organization to the West African Youth League, the I.A.S.B. also sought to inform the public about the grievances faced by those in colonial Africa and created a list of desired reforms and freedoms that would help the colonies. The bureau also hoped to encourage new African trade unions to affiliate themselves with the British labour movement. To further its interest, it held weekly meetings at Hyde Park, where members discussed labor strikes in the Caribbean and Ethiopia. It also supplied speakers to branches of the Labour Party, trade unions and the League of Nations Union and provided questions to be asked in front of Parliament regarding legislation, working conditions and trade union regulations.

== Supporters and Sympathisers ==
The I.A.S.B. had a number of prominent white supporters and sympathisers, amongst them writers, political activists and Members of Parliament, who were officially listed as patrons, including:

- Arthur Creech Jones
- Nancy Cunard
- George Daggar
- Morgan Jones
- Sylvia Pankhurst
- Reginald Sorenson
- Ellen Wilkinson

Several of the patrons wrote articles for the I.A.S.B publications.

== Publications ==
The I.A.S.B. published a news bulletin, Africa and the World, soon after its inception in June 1937. The stated aims of the I.A.S.B. outlined in this publication under the title What We Stand For were:

1. For the Progress and Social Advancement of Africans at Home and Abroad.
2. For full Economic, Political and Racial Equality.
3. For Self-determination.

The National Archives (Britain) has a file, Publication by the International African Service Bureau: Africa & the World, which includes three original copies of the bulletin.

From July 1938 the I.A.S.B. published a new journal, International African Opinion, edited by C. L. R. James and Ras T. Makonnen. The I.A.S.B. publications helped to establish it as the 'official' organisation of Pan-Africanism in Britain.

In 1939 the I.A.S.B. worked alongside the League of Coloured Peoples and the West African Students Union to campaign against the colour bar introduced by Adjutant-General Robert Gordon-Finlayson in the British Army.

The organisation lasted until about 1945.

== Opposition to War ==
In the October 1938 edition of International African Opinion the I.A.S.B. published a Manifesto Against War. Written by Padmore the manifesto was a direct appeal to "Africans, people of African descent and colonial peoples all over the world" to refuse the call to participate in the Second World War which was looming. The manifesto also included an appeal to white workers for unity "against the warmongers and all misleaders of the workers who would send us to be slaughtered".
