= The Negro Worker =

Newspaper of the International Trade Union Committee for Black Workers

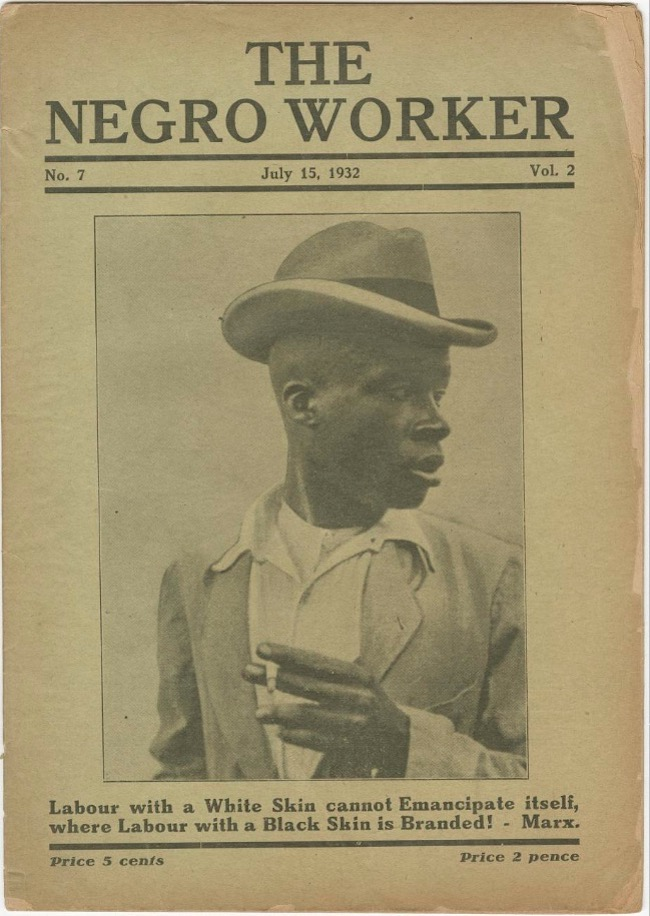
Cover of The Negro Worker Vol. 2 No. 7

The Negro Worker was the newspaper of the International Trade Union Committee of Negro Workers. It was called The International Negro Workers' Review, when launched in 1928, but the name was changed in March 1931. It ceased publication in 1937.

It was edited first by James W. Ford until 1931 and then by George Padmore.

== Relevance ==
The Negro Worker was the great dissemination instrument of the Comintern, which allowed black people and allies to "have updated information on the struggles that were being waged around the world and the necessary (communist) political orientation for radical transformations, taking as reference to the feat of Soviet Russia". Like Marcus Garvey's Negro World, it was banned for subversion in Trinidad and Tobago, Grenada and Saint Vincent, although this did not prevent the working class (mostly from the oil companies) from circulating the publication clandestinely.

== The author ==
The author George Padmore was born Malcolm Ivan Meredith Nurse in 1903 In Trinidad, was a journalist, author, and important leader in the Pan-Africanist movement. He later became involved in the communist party while studying in the United States and later worked in the Soviet Union and Germany. However, he eventually left the Community party because he felt like it was not doing enough to support African independence. He moved to London, where he worked with other activists to fight colonialism and promote freedom for African countries. He also helped organize the 1945 Pan-African Congress#5th Pan-African Congress: Manchester (1945)and became a close advisor to Kwame Nkrumah, helping Ghana gain independence. Padmore is remembered for his major contributions to Pan-Africanism and his fight for African freedom. He died in 1959 in London at the age of age of 56.
