= I. T. A. Wallace-Johnson =

Sierra Leonean trade unionist, journalist, activist, and politician (1894–1965)

- Statue of Wallace-Johnson in Sierra Leone

Personal details
- Born: 1894 Wilberforce, Freetown, British Sierra Leone
- Died: 10 May 1965 (aged 70–71) Ghana
- Party: West African Youth League
- Other political affiliations: United People's Party, United Sierra Leone Progressive Party
- Occupation: Trade unionist, journalist, activist, and politician

Isaac Theophilus Akunna Wallace-Johnson (1894 – 10 May 1965) was a Sierra Leonean, British West African workers' leader, journalist, activist and politician, recognised as one of West Africa’s most influential anti-colonial figures. A vocal advocate for workers' rights, press freedom, and African self-governance, he founded the West African Youth League (WAYL) and played a key role in Sierra Leone's labour movement.

His radical political stance, support for Marxist ideologies, and criticism of colonial rule led to repeated arrests, trials, and expulsions across British West Africa. Wallace-Johnson later transitioned from militant activism to mainstream politics, serving as a delegate at Sierra Leone’s independence talks in 1960.

== Early life ==
He was born to poor Creole parents in Wilberforce, British Sierra Leone, a village adjoining the capital city, Freetown. His father was a farmer, and his mother was a fish trader. Educated at Centenary Tabernacle Day School and later the United Methodist Collegiate School.

Forced to leave school after two years to support his family, he took a job at the customs department in 1913, where he was dismissed for organising a labour strike but reinstated a year later after the secretary of State for the Colonies assessed the case. In 1916, he joined the Carrier Corps as a clerk during World War I, serving in Cameroon, East Africa, and the Middle East as part of the British infantry. After being demobilized in 1920, he worked briefly as a municipal clerk in Freetown, where he claimed to have exposed corruption leading to the arrest of top officials.

After losing his municipal government job in 1926, Wallace-Johnson left Sierra Leone and worked as a sailor, though details of this period are unclear due to conflicting accounts. He either served on an American ocean liner or as an engine hand for Elder Dempster Lines, giving different versions in interviews and lectures. In 1929, he worked for a year in Sekondi as a clerk in a trading company.

All during this time, he wrote articles in the Aurora, a newspaper edited by H. C. Bankole-Bright.

== Union organiser and Communist affiliations ==
Wallace-Johnson joined the UK National Seamen’s Union and reportedly edited The Seafarer, a newsletter for black sailors. He is also believed to have joined the Communist Party, which actively recruited among sailors in port cities.

In 1930, he co-founded the Nigerian Workers' Union, the first trade union in Nigeria, alongside Communist-affiliated Frank Macauley. That same year, he represented the Sierra Leone Railway Workers’ Union at the International Trade Union Committee of Negro Workers in Hamburg, using the alias E. Richards. He was elected to the presidium and wrote for Negro Worker under another alias, Wal. Daniels, advocating for labour rights and self-organization. His involvement led colonial governments to ban the publication.

By 1933, Wallace-Johnson joined Negro Worker's editorial board and attended the International Labor and Defence Conference in Moscow, where he claimed to have studied Marxist-Leninist theory and roomed with Jomo Kenyatta. It was here that he became influenced by the pan-Africanist George Padmore, who was the Comintern-appointed coordinator of Communist activities among blacks. He returned to Lagos, Nigeria, in 1933, but was deported by authorities months later for his trade union activities.

Moving to the Gold Coast, he became a political activist and journalist, supporting the Scottsboro case appeal fund and pushing for workers' compensation laws after the 1934 Prestea mining disaster. His pro-communist writings and critiques of capitalism led to the Parliament of the United Kingdom passing the 1939 Sedition Ordinance, banning "seditious" literature, including Negro Worker. He was criticized by the Gold Coast Independent for disrupting politics.

Wallace-Johnson also had a strained relationship with Edgar Parry’s Labour Movement.

== Gold Coast politics ==
Flag of the Gold Coast, a British colony.

On the invitation of R. B. Wuta-Ofei, editor of the Gold Coast Spectator, Wallace-Johnson settled in the Gold Coast, where he would gain his first experience in mass politics.

A number of Gold Coasters published articles in the Negro Worker and others had attended the First International Conference of Negro Workers. One noteworthy group of men who had strong anticolonial sentiments met at the house of Joseph Ocquaye, the founder of a private school in Nsawam and manager of the Vox Populi newspaper. These men, all respected in their communities, belonged to the Aborigines Rights Protection Society, a once popular political force. They intended to either revive the political influence the society carried or to create a new organisation altogether. The group, which became the predecessor to the Gold Coast chapter of the West African Youth League, found a fresh dynamic leader in Wallace-Johnson.

Most of his activities involved political agitation, as he began working with the Gold Coast Drivers' Union, and started contributing articles to local newspapers like the Gold Coast Spectator, the Vox Populi and the Gold Coast Provincial Pioneer. He also helped workers who suffered injustice by preparing legal documentation for cases. Overall, he tried to raise political expectations regarding peoples' rights and their ability to influence political decision-making. Through contacts in London, he arranged for questions to be asked by sympathetic left-wing Labour Party members in the British Parliament about working conditions and rights in the colonies. Wallace-Johnson also established a new form of mass demonstrations, in which members of the traditional elite no longer dominated African politics. In Wallace-Johnson's reformation of mass meetings, ordinary citizens could vocalise their political opinions. These people took full advantage of the new system; they frequently lambasted colonial authorities and the political establishment, in general. The idea won Wallace-Johnson widespread acclaim and adulation.

He also initiated a fund to assist the legal appeal team in the Scottsboro case in the United States. The case, in which nine young African-Americans were sentenced to death for raping two white women (who were found to have fabricated the entire story), sent shockwaves to liberal and radical political organisations around the world. The Communist Party sought to raise funds for the appeal, using the case as proof of the injustices suffered in a capitalist society. Wallace-Johnson used the case to rally Gold Coasters to support their brethren in the United States. He spoke at public events, claiming that black people could not be treated fairly in a white-dominated government. The colonial government, with full knowledge of Wallace-Johnson's political connections and his deportation from Nigeria, detained him for questioning, but did not arrest him. He used the experience to further his agenda in an article featured in the "Negro Worker". He stated that "British imperialists and white-washed missionaries" had tried to impede his fundraising activities.

He increased his campaigning for civil liberties and improved working conditions after a June 1934 mining disaster in Prestea killed 41 people. At the time, there was no legislation providing the conditions and guidelines for workers' compensation. Mining companies had poor safety records and they underpaid the families of miners injured or killed on the job. Wallace-Johnson disguised himself as a miner to witness first-hand the working conditions there. His experiences gained him some political leverage, which he used to convince the colonial government and the Colonial Office to pass legislation that would improve working conditions and increase workers' compensation. Miners and relatives of the killed miners also protested at mass meetings, and liberal members of Parliament questioned the Conservative government regarding how they intended to address the matter.

=== Other writings and Sedition Act ===
I am a fraud! I swindle the people and steal all their good.
I extort from the poor and pilfer his food.
I reap where I sow not, nor ever had strewn,
And gather from where another had sown.
I cheat and extort throughout the long day,
And grab for my pocket from wherever I may.
I look at the beggar, with an eye, – just "a fun."
The Worker, as well, is just but a tool,
The Producer as well is only a fool.
I employ the Worker at a miserable wage,
And pay the Producer the price of a slave.

— The Declaration of Capitalism by I. T. A. Wallace-Johnson.

Besides publishing articles in the Negro Worker and other newspapers, Wallace-Johnson also wrote poetry and essays. Many of his writings have been lost, but those that are available offer insight into his innermost thoughts. He typically portrayed the Soviet Union as a haven of freedom or capitalist systems like the one in the United States as corrupt. His two most famous works, Das Sdrarstwuiet and The Declaration of Capitalism, were published multiple times in the Negro Worker and were widely received by the general public. In Das Sdrarstwuiet, Wallace-Johnson praised the freedoms given to citizens in the Soviet Union, while in The Declaration of Capitalism, he described the political oppression faced by those living in a capitalist society.

His writings made him popular in Accra and other major cities in the Gold Coast. Colonial authorities were alarmed by Wallace-Johnson's support base, so they passed legislation prohibiting the importation of "dangerous" literature. Colonial governor Thomas Shenton W. Thomas proposed a sedition bill in 1934, which he believed was needed to prevent the flow of seditious literature into the colony. He stated, "[e]veryone knows that there are in the world certain seditious organisations, whose aim appears to be the destruction of law and order. These organisations are very active, and hardly a country in the world is free from their attack. In consequence, most countries have found it necessary to protect themselves by law against such attack."

Meeting the criteria of seditious literature were the Negro Worker, publications of the International Committee of Negro Workers and the League against Imperialism, and all works by George Padmore and Nancy Cunard. Attached to the seditions legislation was a waterworks bill, which would tax the municipalities of Accra, Sekondi, and Cape Coast. These bills sparked political agitation by the social elite, who didn't want their freedom of speech and expression to be restricted, and by the lower-middle class, who had resisted the government's prior attempts to levy direct taxes. Mass meetings were held, protests were organised, resolutions were passed and delegations to address the issues were proposed to be sent to England. However, Wallace-Johnson urged the populace not to send a delegation to England. He believed that more could be accomplished if people launched a grassroots movement by organising protests and demonstrations in their home towns. Then, English people sympathetic to the colonies' problems could apply pressure on their government to get the laws revoked. Wallace-Johnson's plan worked: two members of Parliament, who felt that the new laws were unreasonable, questioned the colonial secretary about the Sedition Act.

== West African Youth League ==
From September 1934, Wallace-Johnson became the subject of scathing articles in the Gold Coast Independent. The headline of one such article read "Meddlesome Wallace-Johnson Must Either Shut Up or Get Out: The Gold Coast Wants Helpers Not Rabid Confusionists." The author of the vehement attack article, speculated to be the editor of the paper, told Wallace-Johnson to go to Liberia, where he could become president, or to Nigeria. He believed that if the leader's actions were not suppressed, the "country and its vital interests [would be] in hopeless ruin." Soon after, a press war erupted between the Gold Coast Independent and two papers supporting Wallace-Johnson, the Gold Coast Spectator and the Vox Populi. Wallace-Johnson had the final word after publishing a group of articles in the Vox Populi profiling the conflict, entitled "The Gold Coast Independent and Myself". He also briefly associated with the Friends of Ashanti Freedom Society, a group composed of young educated men who opposed the restoration of the Ashanti Empire. The men believed that if the empire was restored, they would be denied a voice in political decision-making. Wallace-Johnson forwarded the group's petition against restoration to the League against Imperialism, but the league refused to support the group's request. Afterward, he wrote a pamphlet, describing his support for the restoration of the Ashanti Empire.

In 1935, Wallace-Johnson met Nnamdi Azikiwe, the future nationalist President of Nigeria, in Accra. Azikiwe tried to dissociate himself from Wallace-Johnson's Marxist ideologies, as he believed that there was no chance that his own ideas were compatible with those of his fellow politician. Both men believed that a renaissance needed to occur in Africa, but they disagreed over the methods of doing so. Each man believed that his own idea would prevail in the future. Azikiwe described his first meeting with Wallace-Johnson as such,

We exchanged views and I said that while I thought that it would be practicable for Africans at this stage of development to experience an intellectual revolution, yet an extremist or leftist point of view would be dangerous, in view of the unpreparedness of the masses. He countered by pointing out the fate of Soviet Russia, where the masses were illiterate and impoverished, and yet when Lenin, Stalin, and Trotsky sounded the clarion; they rallied round them and a new order emerged. I warned him that his analogy was false, because Russia was unlike West Africa; the political, social and economic situations were different. He told me point blank that if Africans depended upon intellectuals or leaders of thought, they would not get beyond the stage of producing orators and resolution-passers. It was necessary for doers or leaders of action to step on the scene and prove that the African has a revolutionary spirit in him.

— Nnamdi Azikiwe, My Odyssey: An Autobiography (1970)

Having begun with his speeches and activities and influenced by Azikiwe's ideas, Wallace-Johnson founded the West African Youth League (WAYL) in June 1935 and was appointed its first organising secretary. The members of the league took the motto "Liberty or Death", which caused some alarm among colonial authorities. The league's manifesto was heavily influenced by the Preamble to the United States Constitution: "We the Youth of the Gold Coast (or whatever the section may be established) and of West Africa in general, in order to form a more united body to watch carefully and sincerely, affairs political, educational, economical and otherwise that may be to the interest of the masses of the motherland, to, sacrifice, if need be, all we have for the progress and liberty of our Country, and Race, and to, ensure happiness to ourselves and our posterity." The WAYL was intended to be an all-West African organisation, even incorporating the people of nearby French and Portuguese colonies, however, this never came about. The WAYL focused on political and economic objectives, which, if reached, would produce "a standard of living worth humanity".

Their most important goal was to obtain parliamentary representation for the colonies in London, which would give people a greater voice in government. Like the earlier Aborigines Rights Protection Society and the National Congress of British West Africa, the WAYL sought to protect natural and constitutional rights, liberties and privileges for the African populaces. However, the WAYL was more militant, and eagerly sought to lead the West African people through "economic, social and political emancipation". As Wallace-Johnson wrote in the Negro Worker, the league was trying to drive "towards the establishing of a foundation for national independence". The rhetoric of Wallace-Johnson and the WAYL used Marxist phraseology and Christian imagery in their political thought, but opposed European interpretations of Christianity because of its use as a justification for slavery and colonialism by some politicians. By 1936, the WAYL had established 17 branches in major cities throughout the Gold Coast.

In 1936, Wallace-Johnson was arrested for sedition after publishing an article in the African Morning Post condemning Christianity, European civilisation and imperialism. The colonial governor proposed that he be deported in lieu of being put on trial. After Wallace-Johnson accepted this offer, the governor went back on his word and had the political activist placed on trial in front of the Assize Court. Wallace-Johnson travelled to London to appeal his conviction and to also establish connections for the WAYL.

The WAYL made their entrance into the political arena by supporting the Mambii Party and its candidate, Kojo Thompson, in his candidacy for the 1935 Legislative Council elections. Afterward, Wallace-Johnson equipped himself with new political tactics. He began attacking the "old school" generation of politicians, who he believed couldn't lead the future generations. He stated that "the work needs renewed zeal and energy. It needs new ideas and new visions." In one of the rare occasions that he agreed with Wallace-Johnson, Azikiwe voiced support for his colleague's statements in the African Morning Post. The political elite responded to Wallace-Johnson in a scathing article in the Gold Coast Independent, in which they reminded the WAYL that freedom of opinion did not entitle someone to "go out of their way to insult, abuse, slander, or libel any one". Wallace-Johnson was subjected to more attacks in the press; the Gold Coast Independent referred to Wallace-Johnson as a "jobless extremist" and stated that as a foreigner, he had no right to involve in Gold Coast elections. In July 1935, the paper went as far as to say that Wallace-Johnson was responsible for the passing of the Sedition Bill, which they claimed had been introduced just after he had entered the country.

Prior to the Legislative Council elections, the biggest problem facing the WAYL and the Mambii Party was the lack of suffrage for many of their supporters. Property and literacy requirements for voting were not a problem for the elite, but they were for Thompson's supporters. To combat this deficiency, the league employed some legal and illegal practices to make sure his supporters would be able to cast their vote. In one practice, the supporters who lacked suffrage were given fraudulent town council receipts, which stated their eligibility to vote. They were also given campaign badges for the opposing candidate to avoid possible discrimination at the polls, as election officials were against the Mambii party and the WAYL. The government and social elite were outraged after Thompson was declared the winner of the election. F. V. Nanka-Bruce, a representative in the Legislative Council, filed a petition against the election return and won his appeal a year later.

In national politics, Wallace-Johnson and the WAYL also became active in pressing for passage of mine safety measures and workers' compensation and campaigned for the repeal of the Levy Bill and the Kofi Sekyere Ordinance, among other things. Internationally, the WAYL supported causes pursued by liberal black and white groups, mostly focused in Great Britain. During the Second Italo-Abyssinian War of 1935–1936, the WAYL seized opportunity to attack European imperialism, without the risk of sedition. With the Ex-Servicemen's Association, the WAYL established the Ethiopia Defense Committee, with the specific goal of educating the Gold Coast of the plight of the Ethiopians and on "matters of racial and national importance" once the war was over. However, soon after, the league encountered some internal conflicts. Some members of the Ex-Servicemen's Association accused Wallace-Johnson of taking some of the money raised for the Ethiopian Defense Fund. Immediately, he resigned as the fund's organiser and joint secretary. He then proved to the league that he had not handled the accounts personally, so he could not have taken any money from the fund; however, some members of the Ex-Servicemen's Association remained unconvinced.

The WAYL also lost support from Azikiwe, who had become disenchanted with the league's radical activities. Since he refused to cover their activities in the African Morning Post, Wallace-Johnson decided that the league would have to establish its own newspaper, to be called the Dawn, to cover its activities, ideas and goals. He believed that the league's dwindling support issues would be resolved once the Dawn began publication. The first issue of the weekly newspaper was published on 24 October 1936, but only published on occasion over the next few months as the league struggled financially to maintain the newspaper.

Mary Lokko served as Wallace-Johnson's assistant for a time beginning in 1936, becoming likely the first woman in West Africa to hold a position in a political organization.

=== Arrest and trial ===
By 1936, the league had established itself as a powerful force in the Gold Coast political scene. Colonial authorities and the elite class tried to find ways to get Wallace-Johnson out of local politics and possibly out of the country. Governor Arnold Weinholt Hodson wrote to the Colonial Office, asking for suggestions:

By 1936, the league had established itself as a powerful force in the Gold Coast political scene. Colonial authorities and the elite class tried to find ways to get Wallace-Johnson out of local politics and possibly out of the country. Governor Arnold Weinholt Hodson wrote to the Colonial Office, asking for suggestions:

I do wish that you could suggest some plan whereby I could get rid of Wallace Johnson. He is in the employ of the Bolsheviks and is doing a certain amount of harm by getting hold of young men for his "Youth League." He just keeps within the law; but only just. At many of his meetings he says outrageous and criminal things but the law officers tell me that it is almost impossible to get a conviction on the spoken word.

While the Colonial Office discussed the possibility of deportation, Wallace-Johnson wrote an article entitled "Has the African a God?" in the African Morning Post. In the article, he condemned Christianity, European civilisation and imperialism and told Africans to go back to worshipping Ethiopia's God. On 6 June 1936, the police arrested Wallace-Johnson and Azikiwe, who had to be forced by the paper's proprietor to print the article, for sedition, in what the Negro Worker called "another dastardly plot intended to smash the Youth League". While he was imprisoned, Wallace-Johnson was told that Governor Hodson would drop the charges against him if he accepted terms for deportation. Wallace-Johnson was suspicious by this unusual gesture, so he questioned why the governor had made such a proposition. Hodson claimed that the government did not have a very good case and that they feared the influence Wallace-Johnson and the WAYL had over the populace. He finally decided to accept the proposal after the governor offered him £100. He feared that the government was going to set him up by arresting him for "fleeing justice" after his release. He told authorities to demonstrate their act of good faith by releasing his bail bondsman and providing him with a written statement that he had been freed. The government was reluctant to take such action until Azikiwe pointed out that the government had opened themselves to this dilemma with their initial deportation proposal to Wallace-Johnson. Shortly after, they agreed to £50 to Wallace-Johnson, with the promise that the rest would be paid once he arrived in England.

However, the situation unfolded differently. Wallace-Johnson was told by the proprietor of the African Morning Post that the police commissioner needed to see him as soon as possible. Wallace-Johnson suspected that he was being trapped, so he refused to go. He decided that he would rather travel to Freetown before making his own plans to sail to England. However, this proposal was rejected by the government. Kojo Thompson then came to his house and informed him that the governor had withdrawn his deal and now wanted Wallace-Johnson to stand trial. The activist claimed that the "whole arrangement was a hoax and a dastardly conspiracy to round me up in a more serious charge" and suspected that Thompson was somehow involved in the plot. Wallace-Johnson was put on trial in front of the Assize Court in July and quickly convicted and fined £50. Not all was lost for Wallace-Johnson—the publicity received by the trial helped increase WAYL membership by more than 1,500. In an anticipation of a guilty verdict, Wallace-Johnson and the WAYL began preparing for his appeal to England's Privy Council and hoped to obtain an English barrister to handle the case. The league asked their members to contribute five shillings to the appeal, but even then, the cost was far too great for the league to finance. After learning that the cost of taking a case to the Privy Council was approximately 1,000 pounds, Wallace-Johnson immediately suspected that Gold Coast authorities had known that the cost of appeal would place the league in financial ruin.

Through the WAYL newspaper, the African Standard, he published a number of articles highly critical of top government officials. He was arrested on 1 September 1939 under the Emergency Act adopted at the start of World War II earlier that day. Wallace-Johnson was put on trial without a jury (who would have been sympathetic to his cause, as had been seen in previous cases against him) and received a 12-month prison sentence. He was held at Sherbro Island before being released in 1944.

=== Appeal in London ===
Wallace-Johnson left for London in February 1937 to appeal his case in front of the Privy Council and to also establish contacts for the WAYL. On his journey, he first stopped at Freetown to meet with a group interested in establishing a branch of the WAYL there. The Sierra Leoneans expressed genuine interest in the WAYL, but they hesitated to establish a branch there before obtaining a copy of the league's constitution. Wallace-Johnson then continued on his journey before stopping in Paris, where he contacted the International Bureau of Youth in hopes of setting up a meeting with its general secretary. However, the secretary was out of town, so Wallace-Johnson pressed on in his journey.

On arrival in London, he began to plan his upcoming events. Besides presenting his appeal case to the Privy Council, Wallace-Johnson planned to establish a lobby in England to pursue claims on behalf of WAYL members and to campaign for a commission of inquiry into Gold Coast political, economic and educational affairs. He first contacted Arnold Ward of the Negro Welfare Association and Reginald Bridgeman of the League Against Imperialism, two strong contacts he had made years before in Accra.

Ward and Bridgeman sought to publicise Wallace-Johnson's objectives for colonial reform. Using a cautionary approach, the two men suggested that Wallace-Johnson seek the support of sympathetic members of Parliament, make another attempt at meeting with the general secretary of the International Bureau of Youth, and contact leaders of the youth movement in England. He immediately started working on Ward and Bridgeman's suggestions. He met with interest groups and Labour Party politicians during the day and delivered speeches at public gatherings and rallies at night.

To create a lobby for the WAYL, Wallace-Johnson helped found International African Service Bureau (IASB), with several West Indian political and intellectual figures, including George Padmore, C. L. R. James, Chris Braithwaite, Amy Ashwood Garvey, Jomo Kenyatta and T. Ras Makonnen. He served as the bureau's general secretary and edited its paper, Africa and the World. He used the new affiliation between the WAYL and the bureau to address West African problems to the British general public. The bureau, similar in design and organisation to the WAYL, intended to inform the public about the grievances faced by those in West Africa and created a list of desired reforms and freedoms that would help the colonies. The bureau also hoped to encourage new West African trade unions to affiliate themselves with the British labour movement. To further its interests, the bureau held weekly meetings at Hyde Park, where members discussed labour strikes in the Caribbean and Ethiopia. It also supplied speakers to branches of the Labour Party, trade unions and the League of Nations Union and provided questions to be asked in front of Parliament regarding legislation, working conditions and trade union regulations.

During this time, the WAYL started to unravel, as no individual was capable of leading the organisation as Wallace-Johnson had. Membership declined as employers and government officials threatened members with job dismissal or physical violence. The acting organising secretary stated that it was difficult to get back these members, since they were so dependent on their employers or the government. It was reported that in some branches, only five or six members would show up at meetings. In his absence, Wallace-Johnson's political enemies spread a great deal of anti-WAYL propaganda. He wanted to return to the Gold Coast as soon as possible to resuscitate the organisation, but he lacked the necessary funds for travel. His insufficient funds also affected his work in London, but nonetheless, he pursued claims on behalf of Gold Coast citizens. Eventually, his financial situation was so poor that he couldn't afford bus fare or meals and was even evicted from his room after he failed to pay the rent. Feeling increasingly despondent about his situation, Wallace-Johnson wrote in January 1938:

I think so far, I have done my best and can hold on no longer. I have been made to suffer just because I love my race and people. But while I am prepared to sacrifice my very life in their interest, I am not prepared to suffer death and privation by cold in a strange country. ... I am now on my last lap. If you do not hear from me again, I am gone. ... I cannot stand the strain any more. I must either go somewhere where I could live in quiet or go out of the world.

He decided to return to Sierra Leone, after resigning as organising secretary of the IASB after being accused of stealing money from the organisation. Bridgeman and Wallace-Johnson's other colleagues recommended that he return to West Africa only after his appeal case had been presented before the Privy Council and even offered to pay for expenses.

In this period, Wallace-Johnson also contributed to Sylvia Pankhurst's pan-Africanist weekly The New Times and Ethiopia News, a paper that was susbsequently banned in Sierra Leone.

== Sierra Leone politics ==
Wallace-Johnson returned to Freetown in April 1938 for what he believed would be a short visit. He planned to return to England to pack up his belongings and then move to the United States, where he would not have to "bother about Africa any more as it is apparent that the people of Africa were not prepared to make a move". He was still upset about his political experiences in the Gold Coast and even considered withdrawing from political activism entirely, but he came to realise that his homeland Sierra Leone would be a perfect breeding ground for his political ideas and philosophies. The people of Sierra Leone, mostly the Krios, had lost confidence in their leaders and British colonial authorities during the 1920s. After the Great Depression, Sierra Leone experienced a period of significant economic development and expansion. This was countered by negative industrial and social changes, which gave many working class Sierra Leoneans feelings of resentment and disappointment in the government. They were eager for change and a new face of leadership—something that Wallace-Johnson could provide. He offered the same promise for the Gold Coast, but since he was considered an outsider by many, he had limited success and many misfortunes while spreading his philosophies.

After landing in Freetown, customs agents seized from Wallace-Johnson 2,000 copies of the African Sentinel, a publication that the government considered seditious. Douglas James Jardine, the Governor of Sierra Leone, supported the seize, writing that "[i]t is most undesirable that such nonsense should be circulated among the population of Sierra Leone". Although the Colonial Office rejected the suggestion that the African Sentinel fell under the provisions of the Sedition Ordinance, the incident generated much publicity and convinced Wallace-Johnson to pursue his political exploits in Sierra Leone. He frequented town meetings to deliver speeches critical of the government's actions. In his articles for the Sierra Leone Weekly News, he criticised major politicians, praised the working class, and urged for the creation of an alliance determined toward fighting for rights and civil liberties.

In no other Colony in West Africa do I find the masses in such a miserable state of economic and social disabilities. [sic] Instead of progress, after a lapse of twelve years, I find conditions within the colony rapidly declining.... As a people, we have been too lethargic, drowsy and happy-go-lucky.... A very wide margin has been provided for the foreign exploiters—capitalists and imperialists alike—to drive the wedge of divide-and-rule within our social circle: and while we keep grasping at shadows, they [the foreign invaders] are busy rapidly draining out the natural resources of the land for their personal benefits, leaving us in poverty and want.... Now is the time and now is the hour. There is only one way out of our difficulties, and that is to organise and move. Although it has always been asserted by our so-called benefactors that we should take what we get and be satisfied, I maintain as [James] Aggrey did that we should not be satisfied with taking what we get or what has been given us but to use what we have been given to gain what we ought to have.

— I. T. A. Wallace-Johnson, Sierra Leone Weekly News, 30 April 1938.

=== West African Youth League in Sierra Leone ===
Less than three weeks after his arrival, Wallace-Johnson opened the first branch of the WAYL in Sierra Leone. The league was an instant success and greatly exceeded Wallace-Johnson's own expectations. The league organised public gatherings, established the African Standard newspaper, founded trade unions and contested local elections. Its program included equality for women, unity for people of all tribes, co-operation between the Sierra Leone colony and protectorate, and higher wages for workers. Wallace-Johnson claimed a membership of 25,000 in the colony and 17,000 in the protectorate, although these figures are believed to be exaggerated, according to Spitzer & Denzer 1973b. The Freetown chapter held biweekly meetings at Wilberforce Memorial Hall where Wallace-Johnson exercised his oratorical skill and urged mass support for the League's initiatives. The government downplayed the immense popularity of the WAYL, believing that the massive attendance at meetings was due to the "entertainment value" of speeches. In spite of that, the government had police spies keep track of the goings-on of the meetings.

According to Spitzer & Denzer 1973b, Wallace-Johnson's success with the WAYL was attributed to his "concrete militant efforts to publicize and combat the economic, political, and social dissatisfaction which by the late 1930s affected the lives of the majority of the population". One source of frustration stemmed from the lack of change in unemployment and wages despite the recent discovery of mineral wealth in Sierra Leonean mines. Wallace-Johnson exploited this popular sense of "imbalance between rising expectations and actual living conditions" to rally support for the WAYL. Exploitative mining companies, both public and private, that profited from the mineral wealth of Sierra Leone while ignoring the very poor living and working conditions of the workers were consistent targets of his message. Utilizing his previous experiences in the Gold Coast labour movement, Wallace-Johnson helped organise eight trade unions in Sierra Leone: the Public Works Workers' Union, the War Department Amalgamated Workers' Union, the Mabella Coaling Company Workers' Union, the King Tom Docks Workers' Union, the All Seamen's Union, the Bonthe Amalgamated Workers' Union, the Pepel and Marampa Miners Workers' Union, and the Motorists' Union. Each union's objective was to obtain increased wages and better working conditions through collective bargaining.

Wallace-Johnson's charisma and lack of pretentiousness made him well liked among Sierra Leoneans. At one point, he declared to working class Creoles, "I am not anything above yourselves. I am at par with you." His opponents conceded that Wallace-Johnson's "considerable personal magnetism for the masses" were admirable qualities. According to Spitzer & Denzer 1973b, Wallace-Johnson's most important characteristic was his "truculence and his apparent willingness to thumb his nose at officialdom". In public, he spoke jokingly of colonial officials who most Sierra Leoneans feared. He casually referred to officials on a first-name basis and criticised them "in diatribes and invectives the like of which had never before been heard in the Freetown society where decorum and savoir faire were the hall-marks of the leaders". His associations with England's members of Parliament also lent credence to his reputation.

While not primarily a political party, the WAYL sponsored four candidates for local elections. The WAYL pioneered issue-oriented politics in Sierra Leone and was the first political group to make a concerted attempt to involve the people of the protectorate in the process. Despite restricted suffrage that favoured the upper-class Creole elite, all four candidates were elected, including Constance Cummings-John, the first woman elected to public office in British West Africa. The results severely embarrassed the governor and establishment, especially as it followed the revelation of classified dispatches from the governor to the Colonial Office that signalled the governor's tacit approval of the abuses of the mining companies. The WAYL newspaper, African Standard, was modelled on several left-wing publications in the United Kingdom and was used to print news and editorials often regarded as seditious by senior establishment figures.

Wallace-Johnson was arrested on 1 September 1939, the first day of World War II. Before then, the governor and his legal advisers were attempting to find a way to arrest and convict him for criminal libel, despite the lack of conclusive evidence favouring the prosecution. A series of six acts was passed by the Legislative Council, heavily restricting civil liberties. Added to the wartime emergency provisions, Wallace-Johnson could be arrested without justification. A trial was held without a jury (most of the jurors were WAYL supporters and probably would not vote for a conviction), and Wallace-Johnson was sentenced to 12 months in prison, eventually arriving at Sherbro Island. He was released in 1944. He returned to political activism, but found the WAYL in a state of disarray where tribal and regional issues, rather than the cause of unity that he championed, flourished.

In 1945, he attended the World Trade Union Conference, in London, and then the Fifth Pan-African Congress, in Manchester, representing Trade Union Congress and West African Youth League. The conference was also attended by Lamina Sankoh and Harry Sawyerr representing Sierra Leone as well as other names including Hastings Banda, Jomo Kenyatta and Kwame Nkrumah to name a few.

In 1950, Wallace-Johnson merged the WAYL into the new National Council of the Colony of Sierra Leone. However, he left the group in 1954 to found the United Sierra Leone Progressive Party. He remodelled himself as a Pan-Africanist and de-emphasised his earlier radicalism. He co-founded the United National People's Party in 1956. The UPP became the official opposition after a general election in 1957. Wallace-Johnson was a delegate to the independence talks in London. He died in a car crash in Ghana on 10 May 1965. His wife died in early 2008 in Freetown.
