= Sam Manning (musician) =

Trinidad and Tobago musician

Samuel L. Manning (c. 1898–1960) was a Trinidadian performer and songwriter who was one of the earliest calypsonians to achieve international acclaim.

== Life and career ==
Manning was born in about 1898 in Couva, Trinidad. He worked as a chauffeur and jockey in Trinidad and British Guiana before travelling to London and enlisting in the Middlesex Regiment during World War I. He then served in the British West Indies Regiment in France and the Middle East. After demobilisation he began organising concerts and toured the Caribbean as a vaudeville entertainer, singing calypso songs and performing comedy sketches.

In the early 1920s, he moved to Harlem, New York, where he performed and recorded music that combined jazz and calypso rhythms. In 1924 he recorded for the OKeh and Paramount record labels, and his music became popular with black American audiences as well as expatriate West Indians. He made his first Broadway appearance in 1925 in John Howard Lawson's play, Processional. His song "Lieutenant Julian" commemorated the 1929 transatlantic flight by Trinidadian Hubert Fauntleroy Julian. Manning became increasingly associated with radical political causes. His companion was Amy Ashwood Garvey, who had been Marcus Garvey's first wife. She produced Brown Sugar, a jazz musical production at the Lafayette Theatre that featured Manning and Fats Waller and his band.

In 1934, he moved to England, where he gave performances in London. Manning was a member of the executive of the International African Friends of Ethiopia in 1935. He and Garvey opened the Florence Mills Social Club in London's Carnaby Street, which quickly became a gathering spot for the city's black intellectuals.

"Willie Willie", one of the Soundies featuring Manning and McBurnie

Manning returned to New York City in 1941. That same year, he produced the only known calypso "soundies". film clips made for film jukeboxes located in restaurants and bars. They featured Manning and his ensemble, and Trinidadian dance legend Beryl McBurnie. In 1947, Manning wrote and directed Caribbean Carnival, a Broadway show produced by Adolph Thenstead, which was billed as the "First Calypso Musical Ever Presented". It was a lavish production, featuring 50 singers and dancers, among them New York-based calypsonian the Duke of Iron, Trinidadian dancer Pearl Primus and Manning himself. Manning and Thenstead also founded a record company, Cyclone.

Manning died in 1960 in Kumasi, Ghana, while travelling in Africa.

== References and sources ==
Sources

- Historical Museum of Southern Florida, Calypso: A World Music.
- National Library and Information System of Trinidad and Tobago.
- Hubert Julian, "The Black Eagle"
