= George Padmore Research Library =

Public library in Osu in Accra, Ghana

George Padmore Research Library on African Affairs
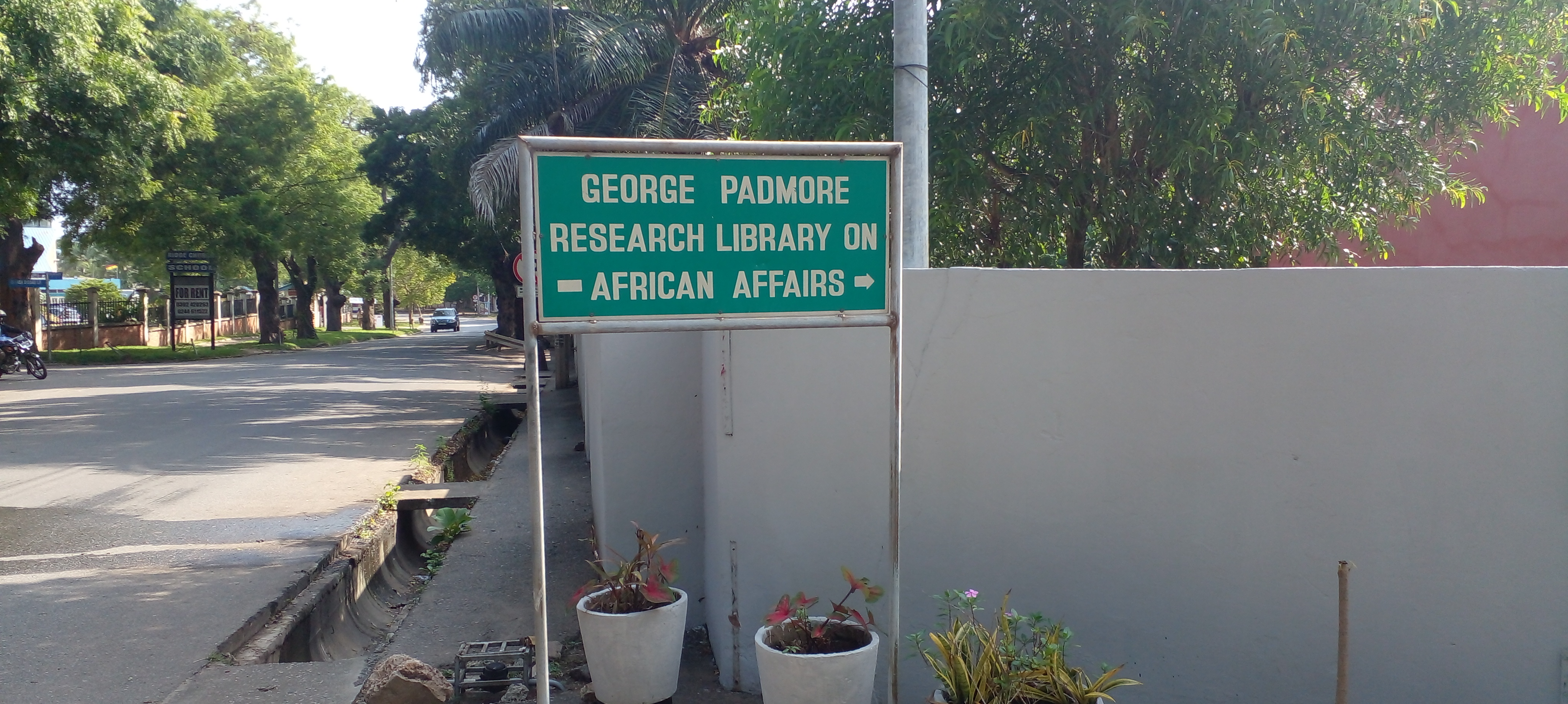
- Signpost of the George Padmore Research Library
- Location: Ring Way, Osu, Accra, Ghana
- Type: Public library
- Established: 30 June 1961

The George Padmore Research Library is a public library in the suburb of Osu in Accra, Ghana. It was built by Dr. Kwame Nkrumah in memory of George Padmore. It is claimed to be the only library and research center in Ghana mandated by law to receive a legal deposit. The library is also claimed to be mandated to publish the Ghana National videography. The library has collections of archives on cultural, educational and political campaign groups, pamphlets, journals, newspapers, books and publications by social and anti-racist organizations between the 1960 and 1990. In August 2018, Daniel Salem a PhD researcher in the European Research Council project APARTHEID-STOPS, donated a poster on behalf of the project to the library. It was built on 30 June 1961. The Library administers international numbering systems as the ISBN and the ISSN. It is part of the Ghana Library Authority.
