= Wilberforce, Sierra Leone =

Coordinates: 8°28′N 13°16′W

Wilberforce is a neighborhood in the West End of Freetown, Sierra Leone. It is home to the Wilberforce military barracks, one of the largest in the country and the main barracks of the Sierra Leone military.

Wilberforce is also home to several foreign embassies, including China, Gambia, Germany, Liberia, Lebanon, Libya, Syria, and Austria.

== History ==
Wilberforce was founded in 1810 to provide accommodation for liberated African recaptives, who had been brought to Freetown by the British Royal Navy West Africa Squadron. The descendants of these liberated Africans, (along with the Jamaican Maroons and Nova Scotians) are the Creole people. The settlement was formerly known as Cabenda.

== Notable People from Wilberforce, Sierra Leone ==
- Isaac Wallace-Johnson, political activist during the independence era.
- John 'Johnny' Taylor: Creole trader killed during Sierra Leone's Hut Tax War of 1898
