= National Dock Labour Board =

The National Dock Labour Board (NDLB), which administered the National Dock Labour Scheme, was an administrative board for the operation of British docks.

== Creation of National Dock Labour Board ==
In 1947, Parliament introduced the "Dock Workers’ (Regulation of Employment) Scheme". The scheme was administered by the National Dock Labour Board, and by local boards, made up of equal numbers of "persons representing dock workers in the port and of persons representing the employers of such dockworkers", the scheme was financed by a levy on the employers. Each local board was responsible for keeping a register of employers and workers, paying wages and attendance money, controlling the hiring of labour, and responsibility for discipline.

== Reasons for creation ==
The scheme was introduced by the Labour government in response to the Dock Strike of 1945. The strike was a rank-and-file protest for an increase in basic pay, and was not officially supported by the Transport and General Workers Union. The strikers were condemned as 'unpatriotic' by Arthur Deakin, General Secretary of the T&G. The government used troops to keep the ports open, and the strike ended after six weeks when the striking dockers accepted an assurance from the T&G leaders that they would negotiate a 'Docker's Charter' with the government.

Under the scheme, dock work was considered a "job for life", with any registered docker laid off by any of the 150 firms associated with the scheme either being guaranteed employment elsewhere or a £25,000 pay off.

== Abolition of the National Dock Labour Board ==
The National Dock Labour Scheme was abolished in 1989 by the Conservative government under Margaret Thatcher. The then Employment Secretary, Norman Fowler, told MPs the scheme had become 'a total anachronism' that stood in the way of a modern and efficient ports industry.

Fowler offered assurances that any docker laid off as a result of the scheme being abolished would be compensated up to the value of £35,000.

== Notable members ==
Notable members of the National Dock Labour Board included Jack Dash.

== Sport and recreation ==
The NDLB introduced a sport and recreation programme for the workers which included a rowing club called the Argosies Rowing Club. The club achieved national success when winning the coxless pairs title at the inaugural 1972 British Rowing Championships.
