= United States of Latin Africa =

Proposed union of Romance-language-speaking Central African countries

- Flag Coat of arms

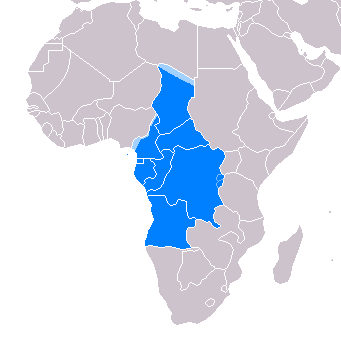

The United States of Latin Africa (French: États-Unis de l'Afrique latine, Portuguese: Estados Unidos da África Latina, Spanish: Estados Unidos de la África Latina) was the proposed union of Romance-language-speaking Central African countries envisioned by Central African politician Barthélémy Boganda. Boganda first called for it in May 1957.

The countries to be part of this large federal entity were Angola, Burundi, French Cameroon, the Central African Republic, Chad, Democratic Republic of the Congo, Equatorial Guinea, Gabon, Republic of Congo, and Rwanda. The idea's implementation was cut short by Boganda's death in a plane crash on 29 March 1959. Boganda viewed this entity to be a counterweight to the powerful British-influenced southern bloc of South Africa and the Federation of Rhodesia and Nyasaland.

The idea of the United States of Latin Africa was criticised by Richard Wright in a special introduction to French readers of a translation of his book White Man, Listen!, on the basis that Latin Africa meant Catholic Africa, and that it would allegedly create a religious division against secular, English-speaking Africa, which he called Protestant Africa. According to Wright, these ideas reflected only the attitudes of those Africans educated in France or Britain, the dominant European powers of that time. He called instead for a Pan-African approach.

== Flag ==
The flag of the Central African Republic was designed by Barthélemy Boganda, who would become its first president. It was originally intended to be the flag of the United States of Latin Africa, which he proposed in 1957. The flag was adopted by the Legislative Assembly of Ubangi-Shari on 1 December 1958. At the time it was introduced, Boganda stated in the national Legislative Assembly that "Those colours, which symbolise the four territories constituting the French Equatorial Africa but also our guide territory, the Metropolitan France, came out of my heart. The red stripe which crosses the four colours is the symbol of our blood. As we did it when France was in danger, we shall shed our blood for Africa and to protect the Central African Republic, member of the French Community."

President Jean-Bédel Bokassa considered the replacement of the flag in 1976, following his conversion to Islam under the influence of Libyan leader Muammar Gaddafi. The proposal was to change the flag entirely in order to feature a crescent and star prominently. However, the proposal was short-lived, as several months later the Central African Empire was created under Bokassa, as Emperor Bokassa I. On 4 December that year, a Constitution described both the emblem for the Emperor's personal use and the existing flag was re-used as that of the Empire. The personal standard of the Emperor was light green in colour, with a gold-coloured eagle in the centre superimposed over a 20-pointed gold star, inspired by the eagle on the imperial standard of Napoleon I.

The flag remained in place after the Central African Empire fell.

== See also ==
- African Romance
- Pan-African Federation
- Pan-Latinism
- United States of Africa
- Economic Community of Central African States
