= Pan-African Federation =

Organization

The Pan-African Federation was a multinational Pan-African organization founded in Manchester, United Kingdom, in 1944.

== Participating groups ==
Participating groups included:

- Negro Association (Manchester)
- Coloured Workers Association (London)
- Coloured Peoples Association (Edinburgh)
- African Union (Glasgow)
- United Committee of Colonial and Coloured Peoples' Associations (Cardiff)
- Association of Students of African Descent (Dublin)
- Kikuyu Central Association (Kenya) represented by Jomo Kenyatta
- West African Youth League (Sierra Leone section) represented by Isaac Wallace-Johnson
- Friends of African Freedom Society (Gold Coast)

== Aims ==
Its aims were:

1. To promote the well-being and unity of African peoples and peoples of African descent throughout the world
2. To demand self-determination and independence of African peoples, and other subject races from the domination of powers claiming sovereignty and trusteeship over them
3. To secure equality of civil rights for African peoples and the total abolition of all forms of racial discrimination.
4. To strive to co-operate between African peoples and others who share our aspirations.

== See also ==
- Decolonization of Africa
- First Pan-African Conference
- Pan-African Congress
- Pan-Africanism
- United States of Latin Africa
