= Kenneth King (academic) =

African Studies academic

- Born: 1940 (age 85–86)
- Education: University of Cambridge; Institute of Education, London; University of Edinburgh
- Occupation: African Studies academic
- Spouse: Pravina King Khilnani

Kenneth James King (born 1940) is since September 2005 Professor Emeritus of International and Comparative Education at the University of Edinburgh. He is a historian, an Africanist and former Director of the Centre of African Studies (CAS) at Edinburgh.

King at the LSE Africa Summit research conference, "Africa within a global context", 22–23 April 2016, London School of Economics. Video duration: 1h:08m:09s. Retrieved 8 June 2023.

King obtained a Bachelor of Arts Classical Tripos from the University of Cambridge, and a Postgraduate Certificate in Education at the Institute of Education, London. He taught African History at a secondary school in Addis Abeba, Ethiopia, and earned a PhD degree in African history at the University of Edinburgh in 1968. He then worked at the University of Nairobi, before returning to Edinburgh, where he was a Lecturer, Reader and Professor. In 1978, he was seconded for four years to the International Development Research Centre (IDRC) in Ottawa, Canada.

Kenneth King and his wife Pravina King Khilnani were both presented with the 2011/2012 Distinguished Africanist Award of the African Studies Association of the United Kingdom (ASAUK).

King has researched the small-scale informal sector (Jua Kali) enterprises in Kenya over a 20-year period, and more recently studied India-Africa cooperation in human resource development, especially in Kenya, Ethiopia and South Africa, and China's aid policies towards Africa.

== Publications ==
Kenneth King published many journal articles, books and book chapters, including:

- Pan-Africanism and Education A Study of Race, Philanthropy and Education in the United States of America and East Africa, Clarendon Press, 1971. Diasporic Africa Press, La Vergne, 2017. ISBN 978-0198216674.
- Ras Makonnen (Author), Kenneth J. King (editor): Pan-Africanism from Within, Oxford University Press, 1971.
- The African Artisan, Education and the Informal Sector, London: Heinemann, 1977.
- Jua kali Kenya : change & development in an informal economy 1970-1995, Athens: Ohio University Press, 1996.
- with Simon A. McGrath: Enterprise in Africa : between poverty and growth, London: Intermediate Technology, 1999.
- with Simon McGrath: Globalisation, enterprise and knowledge: education, training and development in Africa, Oxford: Symposium Books, 2002.
- with Simon McGrath: Knowledge for development? Comparing British, Japanese, Swedish and World Bank aid, London: Zed Books, 2004.
- China's Aid and Soft Power in Africa : the case of education & training, James Currey, Boydell & Brewer Ltd, Woodbridge, Suffolk, 2013. African Issues, ISBN 978-1-84701-065-0.
- "Confucius Institutes in Africa. Culture and language without controversy?", Chapter 6 in Kathryn Batchelor and Xiaoling Zhang (eds.): China-Africa Relations. Building Images through Cultural Co-operation, Media Representation, and Communication, London: Taylor & Francis, Routledge, 2017.
- Education, Skills and International Cooperation : Comparative and Historical Perspectives, Springer, Comparative Education Research Centre, The University of Hong Kong, 2019. CERC studies in comparative education 36. (A selection of King's previously published works.)
- with Meera Venkatachalam (eds): India's Development Diplomacy and Soft Power in Africa, Woodbridge, Suffolk: James Currey, 2021.
