= Chris Braithwaite =

Barbadian seafarer, trade unionist and pan-Africanist (1885–1944)

- Born: Christopher Messiah Braithwaite; 15 January 1885; Bridgetown, Colony of Barbados, British Windward Islands
- Died: 9 September 1944 (aged 59); Stepney, London, England
- Resting place: City of London and Tower Hamlets Cemetery
- Other name: Chris Jones
- Known for: Founder of the Colonial Seamen's Association
- Spouse: Edna May Slack (m. 1936)
- Children: 12

Christopher Messiah "Chris" Braithwaite (15 January 1885 – 9 September 1944), also known as Chris Jones, was a Barbadian seafarer, trade unionist, pan-Africanist and socialist, known for founding the Colonial Seamen's Association.

== Life ==
Braithwaite was born Christopher Messiah Braithwaite on 15 January 1885 (Note: Also cited as possibly being the 15 February 1885.) in Bridgetown, Colony of Barbados (present-day Barbados) to Joseph Braithwaite, a carpenter, and A. R. Braithwaite. Braithwaite joined the British merchant navy as a teenager. Later settling in Chicago, Braithwaite formed a relationship with an unnamed African American woman with whom he had six sons. Following the outbreak of the First World War, Braithwaite rejoined the merchant navy where he worked with the ships' steam donkey as chief donkeyman.

After the war Braithwaite settled for a time in New York City where he found work in a bar. Settling in London, Braithwaite worked for the Shipping Federation. Braithwaite became a member of the National Union of Seamen, and in 1930 joined the Seamen's Minority Movement, a rank-and-file group organised by the Communist Party of Great Britain (CPGB). Taking the pseudonym "Chris Jones" to avoid victimisation by his employer, Braithwaite had joined the CPGB by 1931. He helped distribute the Negro Worker, and with Arnold Ward helped launch the Negro Welfare Association, publicising the case of the Scottsboro Boys. In 1933 he followed George Padmore in resigning from the CPGB in protest at the implicit shift away from anti-imperialism involved with the emerging "Popular Front" strategy.

In 1935, opposing the new British Shipping (Assistance) Act 1935, Braithwaite founded the Colonial Seamen's Association - which included Asian seamen alongside other black colonial seamen; whilst Surat Alley was secretary at the time.

He became organising secretary of the International African Service Bureau (IASB), established in May 1937, whose members included Padmore, C. L. R. James, Jomo Kenyatta, Amy Ashwood Garvey and I. T. A. Wallace-Johnson. Braithwaite wrote a monthly column, "Seamen's Notes", for the IASB journal, International African Opinion. Braithwaite, Padmore and James continued to oppose the CPGB, turning up together to heckle CPGB meetings. Braithwaite and Padmore worked with the Independent Labour Party (ILP) and with ILP intellectuals like Reginald Reynolds and Ethel Mannin.

In 2023, 'Chris Braithwaite House' was opened in Tower Hamlets, named after him.

== Personal life ==
During the 1920s Braithwaite meet his future wife Edna May Slack (1913–1979). The couple had the first of their six children in 1929, and later married at Stepney register office on 23 March 1936.

Braithwaite died suddenly at his home in Stepney from coronary atheroma on 9 September 1944. Buried at City of London and Tower Hamlets Cemetery, his coffin was carried from his home to the cemetery by Black seafarers.

== Further reading / external links ==
- Dorothy Rose du Boulay, Chris Braithwaite and the International African Service Bureau - talk by Chris Braithwaite's granddaughter at Rastafari in Motion, Black Cultural Archives, August 2016.
- Christian Høgsbjerg, Chris Braithwaite: Mariner, Renegade and Castaway (London: Socialist History Society / Redwords, 2014), ISBN 9781909026568
- "Black Salt: Britain's Black Sailors" – Exhibition at Merseyside Maritime Museum in Liverpool which featured Chris Braithwaite in 2017–18.
- A Necessary Fiction - art exhibition by Basil Olton in Tower Hamlets, London, in 2017–18 inspired by the life of Chris Braithwaite.
