= Mary Lokko =

Ghanaian politician

Mary Lokko was a Ghanaian activist active in the West African Youth League in the 1930s and the first woman in West Africa to hold a position in a political organisation.

Lokko was originally a seamstress from Accra. active in the affairs of the West African Youth League in the 1930s, first becoming involved in discussions surrounding the Second Italo-Ethiopian War, which was then raging. In January 1936 she became assistant to I. T. A. Wallace-Johnson. She organised the Women's section of the Youth League and toured the country collecting relief funds for Ethiopia. Little is known about her background or her later life.
