= Jack Dash =

British trade unionist (1907–1989)

- Born: Jack O'Brien Dash; 23 February 1907; Southwark, London, England
- Died: 8 June 1989 (aged 82); London, England
- Employer: Auxiliary Fire Service
- Organization(s): National Unemployed Workers' Movement, Transport and General Workers' Union, National Dock Labour Board
- Known for: Trade Union and communist activism
- Notable work: Good Morning Brothers! (1969)
- Political party: Communist Party of Great Britain (CPGB)
- Honours: "Jack Dash House" – Isle of Dogs

Jack O'Brien Dash (23 February 1907 – 8 June 1989) was a British communist and trade union leader, famous for his role in London dock strikes.

Born in Southwark to a family which was often in poverty, Dash grew up on Rockingham Street. His father Thomas was a scene shifter at the theatre where he met Dash's mother, Rose Gertrude John, who appeared on stage there. She died aged 40 of tuberculosis, when Dash was seven, followed a few years later by his father.

Dash left school at 14 to work as a page boy at a Lyons Corner House. He later became a hod carrier for a bricklayer, and worked in other jobs for short periods in between which he was unemployed. He enlisted in the Royal Army Service Corps and served for two years; he also became a professional boxer, fighting about a dozen bouts.

Dash joined the Communist Party of Great Britain in 1936 and also joined its front organisation, the National Unemployed Workers' Movement. After the outbreak of the Second World War in 1939 he joined the Auxiliary Fire Service while waiting to join the Royal Navy, although eventually he remained in the AFS (later the National Fire Service) for the rest of the war. In 1945, he found a long-term job as a docker and a member of the Transport and General Workers Union and the National Dock Labour Board. Dash prided himself on having been involved in every London dock strike from 1945 to 1969, stating that all but one had been worthwhile; the exception was an inter-union dispute. He was regarded by some as a firebrand and an agitator and was vilified as a bogeyman by the conservative media in the same manner as Derek Robinson and Arthur Scargill would later be. Dash, who was interested in poetry and would quote Samuel Butler or Robert Browning in his speeches, was often invited to address prestigious bodies: he spoke at 40 student meetings, and opposed the motion 'This House would outlaw unofficial strikes' at the Oxford Union debating society.

On 29 December 1959, aged 52, he was severely injured when he fell 40 ft into the hold of a ship in the Royal Albert Docks.

Jack Dash was the outstanding rank and file leader of his generation in the London docks. While he enjoyed undoubted success in improving conditions for workers – between 1959 and 1972 the wages of dockers trebled – between approximately 1960 and 1970, when the shipping industry adopted the newly invented container system of cargo transportation, London's docks were unable to accommodate the much larger vessels needed by containerization, and the shipping industry moved to deep-water ports such as Tilbury and Felixstowe. Between 1960 and 1980, all of London's docks were closed, leaving around eight square miles (21 km2) of derelict land in East London.

After a life-time of activism, Jack retired to become an official London tourist guide and devote more time to his other hobbies of writing and painting. In retirement, Dash became an advocate for pensioners' rights. He was commemorated by the naming of "Jack Dash House", a municipal office building on the Isle of Dogs. Built by the London Borough of Tower Hamlets in 1990 to honour the London dockers' Communist leader, it houses local council offices and the Jack Dash Gallery which holds regular exhibitions of contemporary art from Britain and around the world.

Jack Dash died in London in 1989 at the age of 82. His autobiography Good Morning Brothers!, published in 1969, was a testimony to his work as a militant trade unionist and his lifelong membership of the Communist Party. In it he said that the only epitaph he wanted was: "Here lies Jack Dash / All he wanted was / To separate them from their cash".
