= Ratings in the British Merchant Navy =

Official ratings for cargo ships (UK)

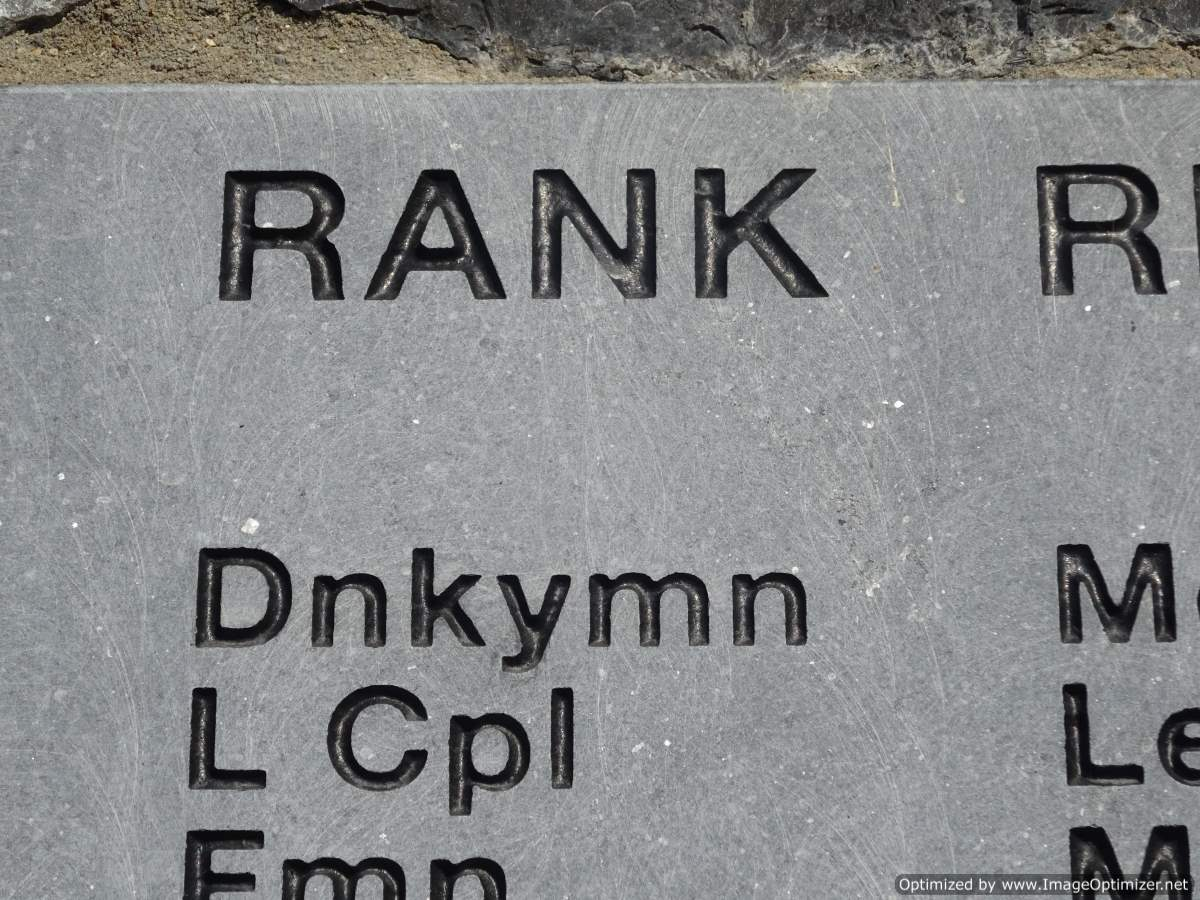
First World War memorial in Kilkenny, Ireland, giving "Donkeyman" as a rank; such a man was the operator of a steam donkey aboard a merchant ship.

The following equivalent ratings in the Merchant Navy were those officially recognised by the National Maritime Board for British Merchant Navy ocean-going cargo vessels carrying up to six passengers in 1919, 1943, and 1964. They are listed in ascending order of seniority.

"Mixed" crew refers to crews that consisted of both white and non-white (African or Asian) members, as was common on British-registered ships, which often had white officers and (sometimes) petty officers, and non-white crew. These tables would probably only have related to white ratings. However, for these purposes, non-white ratings of European, American, or West Indian origin would probably have been considered "white".

The Merchant Navy Ratings Pension Fund (MNRPF) defined benefits scheme was set up in 1978 to provide pensions for retired Merchant Navy ratings.

Deck Department	Engine Room Department	Catering Department
1919
Deckboy		Boy
Ordinary Seaman		
		Assistant Cook (21-59 white crew or 26-74 mixed crew); Assistant Steward (21-59 white crew or 26-74 mixed crew)
		Messroom Steward (up to 59 white crew or 74 mixed crew)
		Assistant Cook (60-89 white crew or 75-112 mixed crew); Assistant Steward (60+ white crew or 75+ mixed crew); Messroom Steward (60+ white crew or 75+ mixed crew); Saloon Steward (60-89 white crew or 75-112 mixed crew); Second Steward (21-59 white crew or 26-74 mixed crew)
		Assistant Baker (90+ white crew or 113+ mixed crew); Assistant Cook (90+ white crew or 113+ mixed crew); Second Cook (21-89 white crew or 26-112 mixed crew); Second Steward (no Storekeeper carried; 60-89 white crew or 75-112 mixed crew)
Able Seaman	Trimmer	Second Cook & Baker (60-89 white crew or 75-112 mixed crew); Storekeeper (60-89 white crew or 75-112 mixed crew)
Boatswain's Mate; Lamptrimmer; Painter; Quartermaster; Deck Storekeeper	Fireman	Baker (60-89 white crew or 75-112 mixed crew); Butcher (60-89 white crew or 75-112 mixed crew); Pantryman (90+ white crew or 113+ mixed crew); Second Cook & Baker (90+ white crew or 113+ mixed crew); Second Steward (Storekeeper carried; 60-89 white crew or 75-112 mixed crew); Storekeeper (90+ white crew or 113+ mixed crew)
Launchman; Water Tender	Assistant Engine Room Storekeeper; Greaser; Leading Fireman	Second Cook (90+ white crew or 113+ mixed crew)
Boatswain; Boatswain's Mate (large steamer); Carpenter's Mate & Joiner (up to 10,000 tons); Pumpman (oil tanker); Sailmaker	Diesel Engine Greaser; Donkeyman; Electrical Greaser; Engine Room Storekeeper; First Leading Fireman; Refrigerator Greaser; Tunnel Greaser	Baker (90+ white crew or 113+ mixed crew); Butcher (90+ white crew or 113+ mixed crew); Cook (up to 20 white crew or 25 mixed crew); Ship's Cook (60-89 white crew or 75-112 mixed crew)
Carpenter (up to 8,000 tons); Carpenter's Mate & Joiner (10,001-25,000 tons)		Second Steward (90+ white crew or 113+ mixed crew); Ship's Cook (90+ white crew or 113+ mixed crew)
Boatswain (large steamer); Carpenter (8,001-10,000 tons)		Cook (21-59 white crew or 26-74 mixed crew); Cook-Steward (up to 20 white crew or 25 mixed crew); Steward (up to 20 white crew or 25 mixed crew)
Carpenter (10,001-12,000 tons)		Chief Steward (21-59 white crew or 26-74 mixed crew); Cook (60-89 white crew or 75-112 mixed crew)
Carpenter (12,001-25,000 tons)		Chief Cook (90+ white crew or 113+ mixed crew); Chief Steward (60-89 white crew or 75-112 mixed crew)
Carpenter (over 25,000 tons)		Chief Steward (90+ white crew or 113+ mixed crew)
1943
Ordinary Seaman		
		Messroom Steward; Assistant Steward/Stewardess; Saloon Steward; Assistant Cook (21-59 white crew or 26-74 mixed crew)
		Second Cook (21-89 white crew or 26-112 mixed crew); Assistant Cook (60+ white crew or 75+ mixed crew); Assistant Baker; Assistant Butcher
Able Seaman	Fireman Steward; Trimmer	Second Steward (60-89 white crew or 75-112 mixed crew; no storekeeper carried); Storekeeper (60-89 white crew or 75-112 mixed crew); Second Cook and Baker (60-89 white crew or 75-112 mixed crew)
Lamp Trimmer; Painter; Quartermaster; Deck Storekeeper	Fireman	Second Steward (60-89 white crew or 75-112 mixed crew; storekeeper also carried); Pantryman; Storekeeper (90+ white crew or 113+ mixed crew); Second Cook (90+ white crew or 113+ mixed crew); Baker (60-89 white crew or 75-112 mixed crew); Butcher (60-89 white crew or 75-112 mixed crew)
Boatswain's Mate (up to 12,000 tons); Launchman; Water Tender	Leading Fireman; Greaser; Assistant Engine-room Storekeeper	Second Cook and Baker (90+ white crew or 113+ mixed crew)
Boatswain's Mate (over 12,000 tons); Pumpman; Sailmaker	Engine-room Storekeeper	Ship's Cook (21-89 white crew or 26-112 mixed crew; chief cook also carried); Ship's Cook (up to 20 white crew or 25 mixed crew); Baker (90+ white crew or 113+ mixed crew); Butcher (90+ white crew or 113+ mixed crew)
	Donkeyman	
Boatswain (up to 8,000 tons)		
Carpenter's Mate/Joiner (up to 10,000 tons)		
Boatswain (8,001-10,000 tons)		Second Steward (90+ white crew or 113+ mixed crew); Ship's Cook (90+ white crew or 113+ mixed crew; chief cook also carried)
Carpenter (up to 8,000 tons); Carpenter's Mate/Joiner (10,001-25,000 tons)		
		Cook-Steward (up to 20 white crew or 25 mixed crew); Ship's Cook (21-59 white crew or 26-74 mixed crew; no other cook carried); Chief Cook (21-59 white crew or 26-74 mixed crew; another cook carried)
Boatswain (10,001-12,000 tons)		
Boatswain (over 12,000 tons); Carpenter (8,001-10,000 tons); Carpenter's Mate/Joiner (over 25,000 tons)		
		Chief Cook (60-89 white crew or 75-112 mixed crew); Steward (up to 20 white crew or 25 mixed crew)
Carpenter (10,001-12,000 tons)		
		Chief Steward (21-59 white crew or 26-74 mixed crew)
Carpenter (12,001-25,000 tons)		
		Chief Steward (60-89 white crew or 75-112 mixed crew)
Carpenter (over 25,000 tons)		
		Chief Steward (90+ white crew or 113+ mixed crew)
1964
Deck Boy	Engine Room Boy	
		Catering Boy
Junior Ordinary Seaman	Junior Ordinary Engine Room Rating	
Senior Ordinary Seaman	Senior Ordinary Engine Room Rating	
Deck Hand (Uncertificated)		
		Assistant Steward; Messroom Steward; Saloon Steward; Stewardess
		Assistant Baker; Assistant Butcher; Assistant Cook; Second Cook (21-59 white crew or 26-74 mixed crew)
Able Seaman; Efficient Deck Hand	Cleaner & Wiper; Fireman Steward; Trimmer	
Lamp Trimmer; Painter; Quarter Master (up to 12,000 tons); Deck Storekeeper	Engine Room Hand; Fireman	Baker or Second Cook and Baker (21-59 white crew or 26-74 mixed crew); Pantryman; Second Cook (60+ white crew or 75+ mixed crew); Second Steward (21-59 white crew or 26-74 mixed crew); Catering Storekeeper
Launchman; Quarter Master (over 12,000 tons); Water Tender	Assistant Engine Room Storekeeper; Greaser; Leading Fireman	
Boatswain's Mate (up to 12,000 tons)		
Boatswain's Mate (over 12,000 tons); Pumpman (oil tanker)	Donkeyman; Engine Room Storekeeper (up to 12,000 tons)	Baker or Second Cook and Baker (60+ white crew or 75+ mixed crew); Butcher
Assistant Carpenter & Joiner (up to 10,000 tons); Boatswain (up to 8,000 tons)	Engineer Assistant	
	Engine Room Storekeeper (over 12,000 tons)	
		Ship's Cook (up to 20 white crew or up to 25 mixed crew)
Assistant Carpenter & Joiner (10,001-25,000 tons); Boatswain (8,001-10,000 tons)		Second Steward (60+ white crew or 75+ mixed crew); Ship's Cook (21-59 white crew or 26-74 mixed crew; Chief Cook carried)
Carpenter (up to 8,000 tons)		Ship's Cook (60+ white crew or 75+ mixed crew; Chief Cook carried)
Assistant Carpenter & Joiner (over 25,000 tons); Boatswain (10,001-12,000 tons)		
Carpenter (8,001-10,000 tons)		Chief Cook (21-59 white crew or 26-74 mixed crew); Cook Steward; Ship's Cook (21-59 white crew or 26-74 mixed crew; no Chief Cook carried)
Boatswain (12,001-25,000 tons)		
Carpenter (10,001-12,000 tons)		
Boatswain (over 25,000 tons)		Chief Cook (60+ white crew or 75+ mixed crew)
Carpenter (12,001-25,000 tons)		Steward (up to 20 white crew or 25 mixed crew)
		Chief (or only) Steward (21-59 white crew or 26-74 mixed crew)
Carpenter (over 25,000 tons)		
		Chief (or only) Steward (60+ white crew or 75+ mixed crew)

== See also ==
- British Merchant Navy
