= Nathaniel Fadipe =

Nigerian writer and pan-African activist (1893–1944)

- Born: October 2, 1893
- Died: 1944 (aged 50–51)

Academic background
- Education: Alumni of the London School of Economics; Columbia University

Academic work
- Institutions: Hampton University

Nathaniel Akinremi Fadipe (2 October 1893 – 1944) was a Nigerian researcher and pan-African anti-colonial activist. After studying in Nigeria, Britain and the United States, Fadipe taught economics at the Achimota College in the early 1930s. He then returned to Britain, where he completed an anthropology doctorate at the London School of Economics, on the sociology of the Yoruba people, and participated in anti-imperialist and anti-colonialist activism.

== Early life ==
Nathaniel Akinremi Fadipe was born 2 October 1893 at Oko-Saje, Abeokuta, Nigeria. His father, I. O. Fadipe, was a Baptist pastor at the town's mission and his mother worked as a trader.

He attended a primary school of the Church Missionary Society (CMS) and graduated from the CMS Grammar School, Lagos. After his studies, he became a clerk in the colonial government of Nigeria before becoming a personal assistant to the manager of Barclays Bank in Lagos.

== Move to Britain and America ==
In 1925, he moved to Britain as there was no educational institute beyond secondary school in Nigeria at the time. When in London he studied at the London School of Economics for four years. Then, he gained a fellowship to study history and internationalism at the Quaker Woodbrooke College in Selly Oak, Birmingham, where he received a diploma cum laude. A thesis he wrote while studying at the college – which criticized the white-majority governments of Nigeria and South Africa for detribalization of the indigenous black populations of their countries and denying them the legal rights and opportunities afforded to the white minority – was reprinted in Woodbrooke's official journal in 1930.

In 1930, the Phelps Stokes Fund (a philanthropic non-profit organization) gave Fadipe money to study in the United States. Upon moving to America, he studied at the Hampton Institute, a well-respected historically black university, before pursuing his master's in sociology at New York's Columbia University, whereupon he became the first Nigerian author to write an academic study of a Nigerian city as his graduate thesis.

== Move to Africa ==
Once he completed his studies, Fadipe taught economics from 1931 at the Achimota College in the Gold Coast colony (modern-day Ghana). This caused consternation with the directors of the Phelps Stokes Fund, who assumed that Fadipe would tour other universities in America, and the fund demanded Fadipe to pay back his grant money in part. This was because the money he received was supposed to cover a two-year stint touring America.

As the only African tutor on the faculty of Achimota during his time there, Fadipe struggled and often felt isolated in his work, whereupon he was highly critical of the economic actions of the country and its government during the Great Depression. Nnamdi Azikiwe, a Nigerian journalist who later became the first independent president of the country, later said that Fadipe went "through hell" at the institution "all due to professional jealousy".

In 1933, Fadipe travelled to Europe to visit Czechoslovakia, with funding from Woodbrooke. In 1934, Achimota College did not renew Fadipe's contract and all trace of his tenure was erased from the college's records.

== Back to Britain ==
Fadipe moved back to London at the end of the 1933–1934 academic year and later enrolled at London School of Economics to study for a doctorate in anthropology. At LSE, he studied under professors Bronisław Malinowski and Morris Ginsberg. He was partially funded by the International Institute of African Languages and Cultures for his studies, but remained in financial difficulties during his time there. His doctoral thesis The Sociology of the Yoruba was the first sociological study by a black African. Despite it being completed in 1939, and used for several decades afterwards as a reputable resource on colonial-era Nigerian history and Yoruba culture, it remained unpublished until 1970.

Fadipe spent the rest of his life in London and was involved in anti-imperialist and anti-colonialist activism. He wrote and worked with the West African Students' Union, the League of Coloured Peoples, collaborated with black activists such as George Padmore and Jomo Kenyatta, and was in touch with Ralph Bunche and Nnamdi Azikiwe. In addition, he also worked with white-led organizations in Britain, such as the National Council for Civil Liberties, and white activists such as Norman Leys and Horace Alexander. Many of these people were Africanists, or involved in peace movements at the time. Fadipe also wrote for a number of newspapers where he condemned the weak international response to the invasion of Abyssinia (Ethiopia) in 1935, and also wrote for the West Africa magazine.

Still struggling with his finances, Fadipe also worked as a clerk, Yoruba language instructor, and translator.

== Death ==
Fadipe died in 1944 from a brain haemorrhage at the age of 51. He was described as being "killed by overwork and perhaps by frustration: he had to combine earning a minimal living at menial tasks with total devotion to the cause of Africa".
