= West African Youth League =

African anti-colonial organization founded in 1935

The West African Youth League (WAYL) was a political organisation founded by Bankole Awoonor-Renner, Ellis Brown, I. T. A. Wallace-Johnson and Robert Ben Wuta-Ofei in the Gold Coast in 1934. The group was a major political force against the colonial government in West Africa, especially in the Gold Coast and Sierra Leone. Awoonor-Renner was elected as the first President of the WAYL. Branches of the WAYL were organised in several towns and cities across the Gold Coast including Accra, Akuse, Axim, Cape Coast, Elmina, Salt Pond, Sekondi and Takoradi.

The League was the first political movement in the region "to recruit women into the main membership and the decision-making bodies of the organisation". Mary Lokko served as Wallace-Johnson's assistant for a time beginning in 1936, becoming likely the first woman in West Africa to hold a position in a political organization.

In 1936 Eleanor Rathbone, an independent British Member of Parliament (MP), asked a question in the House of Commons querying why four members of the WAYL (Gold Coast), Mr Agyeman, Mt Bobieh, Mr Dampere and Mr Atta, were not being allowed to return to their homes in Kumasi, despite being released from prison after having convictions against them quashed.

In 1938 the popularity of the League increased in Sierra Leone as Wallace-Johnson returned. The league contested and won the Freetown City Council elections in the same year. At the time Wallace-Johnson claimed that the organisation had a membership of 40 000. Following the Freetown election victory, the British authorities arrested Wallace-Johnson. The league went into disarray after Wallace-Johnson was sent to prison on Sherbro Island in 1939. After attempting to revive the organisation in 1944, Wallace-Johnson took it into the Pan-African Federation set up in Manchester, United Kingdom. He decided to merge it into the National Council of Sierra Leone in 1950.
