= Amy Ashwood Garvey =

Jamaican Pan-Africanist activist (1897–1969)

Amy Ashwood
- Born: Amy Ashwood; 10 January 1897; Port Antonio, Jamaica
- Died: 3 May 1969 (aged 72); Kingston, Jamaica
- Known for: Activism, black nationalism, Pan-Africanism
- Spouse: Marcus Garvey (1919–22; divorced)
- Parent(s): Delbert Ashwood; Maudriana Thompson

Amy Ashwood (formerly Amy Ashwood Garvey; 10 January 1897 – 3 May 1969), renamed Akosua Boahemaa, was a Jamaican Pan-Africanist activist. She was a director of the Black Star Line Steamship Corporation, and along with her former husband Marcus Garvey she founded the Negro World newspaper.

== Early years ==
Amy Ashwood was born in Port Antonio, Jamaica, on 10 January 1897, the only daughter of the three children of businessman Michael Delbert Ashwood and his wife, Maudriana Thompson. As a child, Amy was told by her grandmother that she was of Ashanti descent. She was also of Indian descent. Taken to Panama as an infant, she returned in 1904 to Jamaica, and attended the Westwood High School for Girls in Trelawny, where she met Marcus Garvey, with whom she founded the Universal Negro Improvement Association (UNIA) in 1914. The UNIA was the most influential anti-colonial organization in Jamaica up until 1938. Its legacy lies in giving women an opportunity to be leaders and influence in the public sphere. At the age of 17, while in UNIA, Amy Ashwood wrote romantic letters to Marcus, in which she said: "Our joint love for Africa and our concern for the welfare of our race urged us to immediate action." She organized a women's section of the UNIA, and in 1918, she moved to the United States, where she worked as Garvey's aide and as Secretary of the UNIA's New York City branch. In 1919, she was made secretary of the Black Star Line and became one of its first directors.

== Marriage to Marcus Garvey ==
She met Marcus Garvey in 1914 and they married on 25 December 1919, but the marriage quickly broke down (there were accusations of infidelity on both sides), ending in divorce in 1922. There followed lawsuits and counter-suits for annulment, divorce, alimony and bigamy. Garvey divorced Ashwood in Missouri in 1922 and quickly married Amy Jacques, Ashwood's former roommate and maid of honour. Marcus Garvey accused Ashwood of theft, alcoholism and laziness. Amy Ashwood reportedly never accepted the divorce and contended to the end of her days that she was the "real" Mrs. Garvey. Amy continued her work as a pan-Africanist, politician, and cultural feminist in the US, Jamaica and England throughout the rest of her life.

== Move to London ==
Ashwood arrived in London 1932 and continued her endeavors as a Pan-African heroine. Decades earlier, in 1914, Ashwood assisted her husband Marcus Garvey with founding the Negro World, its purpose being to connect African-American people across continents, and founded a popular local night club. She moved to Great Britain, where she struck up a friendship with Ladipo Solanke. Together, they founded the Nigerian Progress Union (NPU), which at its formation consisted of 13 students. At the very first meeting, she was honoured with the Yoruba chieftaincy title "Iyalode" (meaning "Mother of the Community"). She later supported Solanke's West African Students' Union, but in 1924 she returned to New York, where she produced comedies with her companion, Sam Manning, a Trinidadian calypso singer who was one of the world's pioneering black recording artists. Among the productions was Brown Sugar, a jazz musical production at the Lafayette Theater, which featured Manning and Fats Waller and his band.

== 1934–44: London, Jamaica, and New York ==
In 1934, she returned to London, and with Manning, opened the Florence Mills Social Club a jazz club on Carnaby Street, which became a gathering spot for supporters of Pan-Africanism. Although early pan-Africanists used to have patriarchal characteristics, they awakened women's consciousness for social justice. She helped to establish the International African Friends of Abyssinia with C. L. R. James, the International African Service Bureau with figures like George Padmore, Chris Braithwaite and Jomo Kenyatta, and the London Afro-Women's Centre.

She spent some time in 1939 in New York, then went to Jamaica, where she and other prominent people formed the short-lived J. A. G. Smith Political Party. She became active in politics upon her return to Jamaica. She became eligible for a candidacy for legislature and was actively engaged in the movement for self-government. She planned to use her position in legislature to push for women's rights. During World War II Ashwood founded a domestic science institute for girls in Jamaica.

In 1944, she again returned to New York, where she joined the West Indies National Council and the Council on African Affairs, and also campaigned for Adam Clayton Powell Jr.

== 5th Pan-African Congress, 1945, and later years ==
Ashwood was involved in organizing the first session of the 5th Pan-African Congress in Manchester in 1945. During the opening session, she chaired for independence from colonial rule. Ashwood and Alma La Badie were the only two women presenters. Eventually, on 19 October, the two women were able to speak of issues that Jamaican women dealt with. In 1946, Ashwood moved to Liberia for three years, where she began a relationship with the country's president, William Tubman. While there she researched the conditions for women in Nigeria and she gave talks to women's groups. She then returned to London, helping to set up the "Afro Peoples Centre" in Ladbroke Grove in 1953. She was a friend of Claudia Jones, and was on the editorial board of the Brixton-based newspaper West Indian Gazette, founded by Jones in 1958. In the wake of the 1958 Notting Hill race riots, Ashwood co-founded the Association for the Advancement of Coloured People. In 1959, she chaired an enquiry into race relations following the murder of Kelso Cochrane in London in May that year.

== Travels in Dwaben, Ashanti, Ghana, 1946, and other African countries ==
According to Mrs Garvey, her grandmother told her that she descended from Dwaben (pronounced "Juaben") and that her grandmother (known as "Granny Dabas") was a captive from Juaben. Granny Dabas's name was Boahemaa. In 1924 she met J. B. Danquah in London and told him her grandmother's story and Danquah confirmed to her that Dwaben is in fact an Asante city-state. Fifteen years later she also met another Ghanaian Barrister Kwabena Kese. In 1946, Barrister Kese took Mrs Garvey to Juaben leading to the verification of her Granny Dabas' account and would later adopt the name Akosua Boahemaa. She would also meet Osei Tutu Agyeman Prempeh II. The Asante people are commonly known to Jamaicans as the freedom fighters that fought against slavery and oppression. The national heroine Nanny of the Maroons is also an Asante queen. Many Jamaicans, even non-maroons, can also make accounts of having family of Asante descent.

Ashwood then embarked on a Caribbean tour in 1953. She visited Antigua, Aruba, Barbados, British Guiana, Dominica, Trinidad and Tobago and Suriname. In Barbados, she presided over the formation of the Barbados Women's Alliance. During her tour, Garvey provided multiple lectures throughout the Caribbean. In 1954 Garvey opened The Afro Woman's Centre and Residential Club, in Ladbroke Grove, London.

She returned to Liberia in 1960, but was back in London four years later, and spent the next three years mostly in Jamaica and Trinidad. In 1967–68 she toured the United States.

With failing health, she returned to Jamaica in 1968, and died in Kingston on 3 May the following year, aged 72. She was buried on Sunday, 11 May 1969, in Kingston's Calvary cemetery.
