= International Trade Union Committee of Negro Workers =

International trade union organisation (1928–1937)

ITUCNW
- International Trade Union Committee of Negro Workers
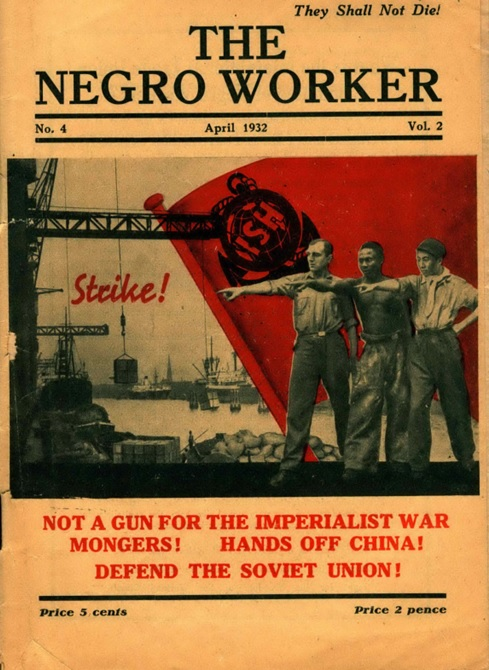
- 1932 issue of the ITUCNW journal The Negro Worker
- Founded: 31 July 1928
- Dissolved: 1937
- Headquarters: Hamburg
- Key people: James W. Ford, General Secretary (1928-31); George Padmore, General Secretary (1931-33)
- Affiliations: Profintern

The International Trade Union Committee of Negro Workers (ITUCNW) was a section of the Profintern that existed during the late 1920s and 1930s and acted as a radical transnational platform for black workers in Africa and the Atlantic World.

== History ==
It was launched in July 1930 at an "International Conference of Negro Workers" that took place in Hamburg. There were 17 delegates including:

- Vivian Henry: Trinidad
- S. M. DeLeon: Jamaica
- I. T. A. Wallace-Johnson: Sierra Leone
- Albert Nzula: South Africa
- Jomo Kenyatta: Kenya
- Frank Macaulay
- George Padmore
- James W. Ford
- Isaiah Hawkins
- J. Reid
- Edward Francis Small: Gambia
- T. S. Morton: Gold Coast
- J. A. Akrong: Gold Coast

It produced a journal, The Negro Worker, which was edited by George Padmore until 1931 and by James W. Ford until 1937 when it ceased publication.
