= George Padmore =

Trinidadian Pan-Africanist and writer (1903–1959)

- Born: Malcolm Ivan Meredith Nurse; 28 June 1903; Arouca, Trinidad and Tobago
- Died: 23 September 1959 (aged 56); London, England
- Resting place: Christiansborg Castle, Ghana
- Education: St Mary's College; Fisk University; Howard University
- Occupations: Journalist, author, pan-Africanist
- Notable work: How Britain Rules Africa (1936); Africa and World Peace (1937); Pan-Africanism or Communism? The Coming Struggle for Africa (1956)

George Padmore (28 June 1903 – 23 September 1959), born Malcolm Ivan Meredith Nurse, was a leading Pan-Africanist, journalist, and author. He left his native Trinidad in 1924 to study medicine in the United States, where he also joined the Communist Party.

From there, he moved to the Soviet Union, where he was active in the party, and working on African independence movements. He also worked for the party in Germany but left after the rise of Nazism in the 1930s. In 1935, the official foreign policy of the USSR shifted, Britain and France, colonial powers with colonies in Africa, were now referred "democratic-imperialisms", a lower priority than the category of "fascist-imperialist" powers, Germany and Japan. This shift fell into direct contradiction with Padmore's prioritization of African independence, as Germany and Japan had no colonies in Africa. Padmore broke instantly with the Kremlin, but continued to support socialism ideologically. In 1939, the official view shifted again, as it did after 1941, and afterwards.

Padmore lived for a time in France, before settling in London, England, in 1934. Toward the end of his life he moved to Accra, Ghana, where he helped shape the politics of Kwame Nkrumah and the Convention People's Party.

== Biography ==
=== Early years ===
Malcolm Ivan Meredith Nurse, better known by his pseudonym George Padmore, was born on 28 June 1903 in Arouca District, Tacarigua, Trinidad, then part of the British West Indies. His paternal great-grandfather was an Asante warrior who was taken prisoner and sold into slavery at Barbados, where his grandfather was born. His father, James Hubert Alfonso Nurse, was a local schoolmaster who had married Anna Susanna Symister of Antigua, a naturalist.

Nurse attended Tranquillity Intermediate College in Port of Spain, before going to St Mary's College for two years (1914 and 1915). He transferred to Pamphylian High School, graduating from there in 1918. After that, he worked for several years as a reporter with the Trinidad Publishing Company.

In late 1924, he travelled to the United States to take up medical studies at Fisk University, a historically black college in Tennessee. He had recently married, on 10 September that year, and his wife Julia Semper would later join him in America. She left behind their daughter Blyden, who was born in 1925 (and died in 2012). According to Nurse's instruction, she was named in honour of the African nationalist Edward Blyden of Liberia. Nurse subsequently registered at New York University but soon transferred to Howard University.

=== Communist Party ===
During his college years in the US, Nurse became involved with the Workers (Communist) Party (CPUSA). When engaged in party business, he adopted the name George Padmore (compounding the Christian name of his father-in-law, Constabulary Sergeant-Major George Semper, and the surname of the friend who had been his best man, Errol Padmore).

Padmore officially joined the Communist Party in 1927 (when he was in Washington, D.C.) and was active in its mass organization targeted to black Americans, the American Negro Labor Congress. In March 1929 he was a fraternal (non-voting) delegate to the 6th National Convention of the CPUSA, held in New York City.

Padmore, an energetic worker and prolific writer, was tapped by Communist Party trade union leader William Z. Foster as a rising star. He was taken to Moscow to deliver a report on the formation of the Trade Union Unity League to the Communist International (Comintern) later in 1929. Following his presentation, Padmore was asked to stay on in Moscow to head the Negro Bureau of the Red International of Labour Unions (Profintern). He was elected to the Moscow City Soviet.

As head of the Profintern's Negro Bureau, Padmore helped to produce pamphlet literature and contributed articles to Moscow's English-language newspaper, the Moscow Daily News. He was also used periodically as a courier of funds from Moscow to various foreign Communist Parties.

As a deputy of the Moscow soviet, Padmore had served on the commission to investigate the [1930 racial] assault on [Robert] Robinson [in Stalingrad].... Even after he had renounced Communism in the mid-1930s, Padmore continued until his death in 1959 to cite the trial of Robinson's assailants as evidence that the USSR was the only country that had effectively eradicated racial discrimination. --Meredith L. Roman, "Robert Robinson (1930s)", in Beatriz Gallotti Mamigonian and Karen Racine (eds), The Human Tradition in the Black Atlantic, 1500–2000, p. 142, Rowman & Littlefield (16 November 2009), ISBN 0742567303.

In July 1930, Padmore was instrumental in organizing an international conference in Hamburg, Germany. It launched a Comintern-backed international organization of black labour organizations called the International Trade Union Committee of Negro Workers (ITUCNW). Padmore lived in Vienna, Austria, during this time, where he edited the monthly publication of the new group, The Negro Worker.

In 1931, Padmore moved to Hamburg and accelerated his writing output, continuing to produce the ITUCNW magazine and writing more than 20 pamphlets in a single year. This German interlude came to an abrupt close by the middle of 1933, however, as the offices of the Negro Worker were ransacked by ultra-nationalist gangs following the Nazi seizure of power. Padmore was deported to England by the German government, while the Comintern placed the ITUCNW and its Negro Worker on hiatus in August 1933.

Disillusioned by what he perceived as the Comintern's flagging support for the cause of the independence of colonial peoples in favour of the Soviet Union's pursuit of diplomatic alliances with the colonial powers, Padmore abruptly severed his connection with the ITUCNW late in the summer of 1933. The Comintern's disciplinary body, the International Control Commission (ICC), asked him to explain his unauthorized action. When he refused to do so, the ICC expelled him from the Communist movement on 23 February 1934. A phase of Padmore's political journey was at an end.

As a result of his membership in the Communist Party and working for it in the Soviet Union and Germany, Padmore was barred from re-entry into the United States. He was a non-citizen and the government did not want to admit known communists.

=== Pan-Africanist ===
Although alienated from Stalinism, Padmore remained a socialist. He sought new ways to work for African independence from imperial rule. Relocating to France, where Garan Kouyaté was an ally from his Comintern days, Padmore began to write a book: How Britain Rules Africa. With the help of former American heiress Nancy Cunard, he found a London agent and, eventually, a publisher (Wishart). It published the book in 1936, the year the publisher became Lawrence and Wishart, publishing house of the Communist Party of Great Britain. Publication of books by black men at that time was rare in the United Kingdom. A Swiss publisher distributed a German translation in Germany.

In 1934, Padmore moved to London, where he became the centre of a community of writers dedicated to pan-Africanism and African independence. His boyhood friend C. L. R. James, also from Trinidad, was already there, writing and publishing. James had started International African Friends of Ethiopia in response to Italy's invasion of Ethiopia. That organization developed into the International African Service Bureau (IASB), which became a centre for African and Caribbean intellectuals' anti-colonial activity. Padmore was chair of IASB, the Barbadian trade unionist Chris Braithwaite was its organising secretary, and James edited its periodical, International African Opinion. Ras Makonnen from British Guiana handled the business end. Other key members included Jomo Kenyatta from Kenya and Amy Ashwood Garvey.

As Carol Polsgrove has shown in Ending British Rule in Africa: Writers in a Common Cause, Padmore and his allies in the 1930s and 1940s—among them C. L. R. James, Kenya's Jomo Kenyatta, the Gold Coast's Kwame Nkrumah and South Africa's Peter Abrahams—saw publishing as a strategy for political change. They published small periodicals, which were sometimes seized by authorities when they reached the colonies. They published articles in other people's periodicals, for instance, the Independent Labour Party's New Leader. They published pamphlets. They wrote letters to the editor; and, thanks to the support of publisher Fredric Warburg (of Secker & Warburg), they published books. Warburg brought out Padmore's Africa and World Peace (1937), as well as books by both Kenyatta and James.

In a foreword to Africa and World Peace, Labour politician Sir Stafford Cripps wrote: "George Padmore has performed another great service of enlightenment in this book. The facts he discloses so ruthlessly are undoubtedly unpleasant facts, the story which he tells of the colonization of Africa is sordid in the extreme, but both the facts and the story are true. We have, so many of us, been brought up in the atmosphere of 'the white man's burden', and have had our minds clouded and confused by the continued propaganda for imperialism that we may be almost shocked by this bare and courageous exposure of the great myth of the civilizing mission of western democracies in Africa." The Biographical Note on the cover describes Padmore as European correspondent for the Pittsburgh Courier, Gold Coast Spectator, African Morning Post, Panama Tribune, Belize Independent and The Bantu World.

In 1941, Padmore argued that the British Empire should be transformed into "federated commonwealths based upon Socialist principles."

Before World War II, James left for the United States, where he met Kwame Nkrumah, a student from the Gold Coast who studied at Lincoln University in Pennsylvania. James gave Nkrumah a letter of introduction to Padmore. When Nkrumah arrived in London in May 1945 intending to study law, Padmore met him at the station. It was the start of a long alliance. Padmore was then organizing the 1945 Manchester Pan-African Congress (designated the Fifth Pan-African Congress), attended not only by the inner circle of the IASB but also by W. E. B. Du Bois, the American organizer of earlier Pan-African conferences. The Manchester conference helped set the agenda for decolonisation in the post-war period.

Padmore used London as his base for more than two decades. He and Dorothy Pizer, a white English writer and his domestic partner and co-worker, shared a flat that became a centre for African nationalists. Padmore maintained connections across the world, sending articles to international newspapers and keeping up a correspondence with American writers and activists W. E. B. Du Bois and Richard Wright. The latter was then living in Paris, France. At Padmore's urging, Wright travelled to the Gold Coast in 1953 to explore the buildup to independence, and he wrote his book Black Power (1954). Before Wright left the Gold Coast, he gave a confidential report on Nkrumah to the American consul; later he reported on Padmore to the American Embassy in Paris. According to the embassy's account, Wright said that Nkrumah was relying heavily on Padmore as he made plans for independence.

When Wright published Black Power in 1954, Padmore was finishing a book that he hoped would be both a history and blueprint for African independence: Pan-Africanism or Communism? It was his attempt to counter Cold War suspicions in Western nations that the African independence movements were fundamentally communist-inspired.

As independence neared for the Gold Coast, the London community had splintered. In 1956, James had returned from the United States, but Padmore and Pizer referred to him with condescension in letters to Wright. Meanwhile, former Padmore ally Peter Abrahams published a roman à clef entitled A Wreath for Udomo (1956), which contained unflattering portrayals of the members of this London political community. George Padmore was identified by many as the model for the character "Tom Lanwood".

But Padmore's alliance with Nkrumah held firm. From the time of Nkrumah's return to the Gold Coast in 1947 to lead its independence movement, Padmore advised him in long detailed letters. He also wrote dozens of articles for Nkrumah's newspaper, the Accra Evening News, and wrote a history of The Gold Coast Revolution (1953). With Dorothy Pizer (who was a writer and secretary), Padmore encouraged the leader to write his autobiography, and Ghana: The Autobiography of Kwame Nkrumah was published in 1957, the year the Gold Coast became independent Ghana. Padmore deputized for Nkrumah as best man when Sir Stafford Cripps' daughter Peggy married the anti-colonialist Joe Appiah, who was one of Nkrumah's closest allies at the time.

Padmore accepted Nkrumah's invitation to move to Ghana, but his time there as Nkrumah's advisor on African affairs was difficult. Padmore was talking with friends about leaving Ghana to settle elsewhere when he returned to London for treatment of cirrhosis of the liver.

Padmore died on 23 September 1959, aged 56, at University College Hospital in London. A few days later, responding to rumours that the activist had been poisoned, his companion Pizer typed out a detailed statement about his death. She said that his liver condition had worsened in the previous nine months, before he sought treatment from a longtime physician friend. Due to his failing liver, he suffered haemorrhages that resulted in his death.

=== Legacy ===
- After Padmore's death, Nkrumah paid tribute to him in a radio broadcast: "One day, the whole of Africa will surely be free and united and when the final tale is told, the significance of George Padmore's work will be revealed." In the Pittsburgh Courier, George Schuyler said Padmore's writings had been "an inspiration to the men who dreamed of a free Africa". Padmore's physician friend, Cecil Belfield Clarke, wrote the obituary that ran in The Times, describing Padmore as a writer who wrote books and studied them. Jamaican pan-Africanist and diplomat Dudley Thompson wrote of Padmore in a letter to The Guardian: "He was truly international and the entire colonial world has suffered a loss."
- After a funeral service at a London crematorium, Padmore's ashes were buried at Christiansborg Castle in Ghana on 4 October 1959. The ceremony was broadcast in the US by NBC television. As C. L. R. James wrote,

...eight countries sent delegations to his funeral in London. But it was in Ghana that his ashes were interred and everyone says that in this country, famous for its political demonstrations, never had there been such a turnout as that caused by the death of Padmore. Peasants from far-flung regions who, one might think, had never even heard his name, managed to find their way to Accra to pay a final tribute to the West Indian who spent his life in their service.

Staying on in Accra, Dorothy Pizer wrote a preface for a French edition of Padmore's Pan-Africanism or Communism. She began research for a biography of Padmore. However, as she told Nancy Cunard, she was frustrated by his habit of having destroyed his personal papers and not having talked about his past.

- The George Padmore Research Library, in the neighbourhood of Ridge, Accra, Ghana, is named after him. Kwame Nkrumah spoke at the opening of the building dedicated to Padmore as a memorial library on 30 June 1961. Nkrumah ranked Padmore as "one of the greatest architects of the African liberation movement ... dedicated to African union and liberty."
- James, relocated to Port of Spain, Trinidad, wrote a series of articles on Padmore for The Nation. James also began collecting material for a biography but eventually produced only a slim manuscript, "Notes on the Life of George Padmore." For years, James tried to publish his book Nkrumah and the Ghana Revolution; the book was published in 1977 (London: Allison and Busby). In it, James omitted any reference to Padmore's own 1953 book on the Gold Coast revolution; his correspondence has numerous references to his idea that Padmore did not understand the revolution.
- Ras Makonnen, who understood so well the importance of books about the African nationalist movement, published his own intimate account of the London-based community around Padmore, Pan-Africanism from Within (1973). James R. Hooker wrote a biography of Padmore, Black Revolutionary (1967). Padmore is the central figure featured in Carol Polsgrove's Ending British Rule in Africa: Writers in a Common Cause, published in 2009.
- In 1991, John La Rose founded the George Padmore Institute (GPI), based in North London, with the aim of "continuing the traditions which shaped his life: independent, radical vision and outlook connecting the Caribbean, Africa, Europe, North America and Asia." Educational and cultural activities, including talks and readings, take place at the GPI, which occasionally publishes relevant materials. It is an archive, educational resource and research centre housing materials relating to the black community of Caribbean, African and Asian descent in Britain and continental Europe. La Rose also founded the George Padmore Supplementary School in 1969.
- On 28 June 2011 – 98 years to the day since Padmore was born – the Nubian Jak Community Trust unveiled a blue plaque at Padmore's former address, 22 Cranleigh Street in the London Borough of Camden, in a ceremony addressed by the High Commissioner of Trinidad & Tobago, the High Commissioner of Ghana, the Mayor of Camden, Selma James, Nina Baden-Semper (related to Padmore's in-laws), and others. According to Cameron Duodu: "Many of the statements and pamphlets, as well as the correspondence with which leaders of the British colonies in Africa combated the policies of the Colonial Office in London, were drafted at the dining table of 22 Cranleigh Street. It was also the venue at which George Padmore organised the 5th Pan-African Conference in Manchester in 1945."
- George Padmore Road and George Padmore Lane, in Hurlingham, Nairobi, Kenya, are named after him.

== Works ==
- The Life and Struggles of Negro Toilers (London: Red International of Labour Unions Magazine for the International Trade Union Committee of Negro Workers, 1931)
- Haiti, an American Slave Colony (Centrizdat, 1931)
- The Negro Workers and the Imperialist War Intervention in the USSR (1931)
- How Britain Rules Africa (London: Wishart Books, 1936)
- Africa and World Peace (Foreword by Sir Stafford Cripps; London: Martin Secker and Warburg Ltd, 1937)
- Hands Off the Protectorates (London: International African Service Bureau, 1938)
- Hands off the Colonies! New Leader, 25 February 1938 .
- The White Man's Duty: An Analysis of the Colonial Question in the Light of the Atlantic Charter (with Nancy Cunard) (London: W. H. Allen & Co., 1942)
- The Voice of Coloured Labour (Speeches and Reports of Colonial Delegates to the World Trade Union Conference, 1945) (editor) (Manchester: Panaf Service, 1945)
- How Russia Transformed Her Colonial Empire: A Challenge to the Imperialist Powers (in collaboration with Dorothy Pizer) (London: Dennis Dobson, 1946)
- "History of the Pan-African Congress (Colonial and Coloured Unity: A Programme of Action)" (editor) (1947). Reprinted in Hakim Adi and Marika Sherwood, The 1945 Manchester Pan-African Congress Revisited (London: New Beacon Books, 1995)
- Africa: Britain's Third Empire (London: Dennis Dobson, 1949)
- The Gold Coast Revolution: The Struggle of an African People from Slavery to Freedom (London: Dennis Dobson, 1953)
- Pan-Africanism or Communism? The Coming Struggle for Africa (Foreword by Richard Wright. London: Dennis Dobson, 1956)

Online resources available at https://www.marxists.org/archive/padmore/
