= John Nelson-Williams =

Sierra Leonean politician

Hon. John Nelson-Williams
- Hon. John Nelson-Williams (seated third from left) in 1961
- Born: John Arnold Nelson-Williams; 15 September 1932; Freetown, Sierra Leone
- Died: 13 June 2008 (aged 75); Freetown, Sierra Leone
- Education: Methodist Boys High School
- Occupations: Member of Parliament; politician
- Relatives: Dr Claude Nelson-Williams (brother), General Alfred Nelson-Williams (paternal cousin), James Blyden Jenkins-Johnston (maternal cousin), Justice Claudia Taylor (paternal cousin).

John Arnold Nelson-Williams (15 September 1932 – 13 June 2008) was a Sierra Leonean politician and Member of Parliament who was active in the politics of Sierra Leone in the 1960s.

John Nelson-Williams served as the first Minister of Broadcasting and Communication in the first postcolonial cabinet of Sierra Leone between 1961 and 1967.

As the first Minister of Broadcasting and Communication, he promoted mass media across Sierra Leone through radio and television. He was well-known in Sierra Leone for heavily introducing and promoting television broadcasting and the use of Philips transistor radios across the country.

== Early life and family background ==
John Nelson-Williams was born on 15 September 1932 at Freetown, Sierra Leone, to a professional and political family of Creole origin.

He was the fourth of five children born to T.E. Nelson-Williams (1894-1960), a politician and lawyer who served as a colonial judge, and M.D. Nelson-Williams, née Jenkins-Johnston (1904-1989), a nurse and former teacher.

His four siblings were professionals who qualified as lawyers, as a teacher and school principal, and as a medical doctor by the 1950s and 1960s.

== Education ==
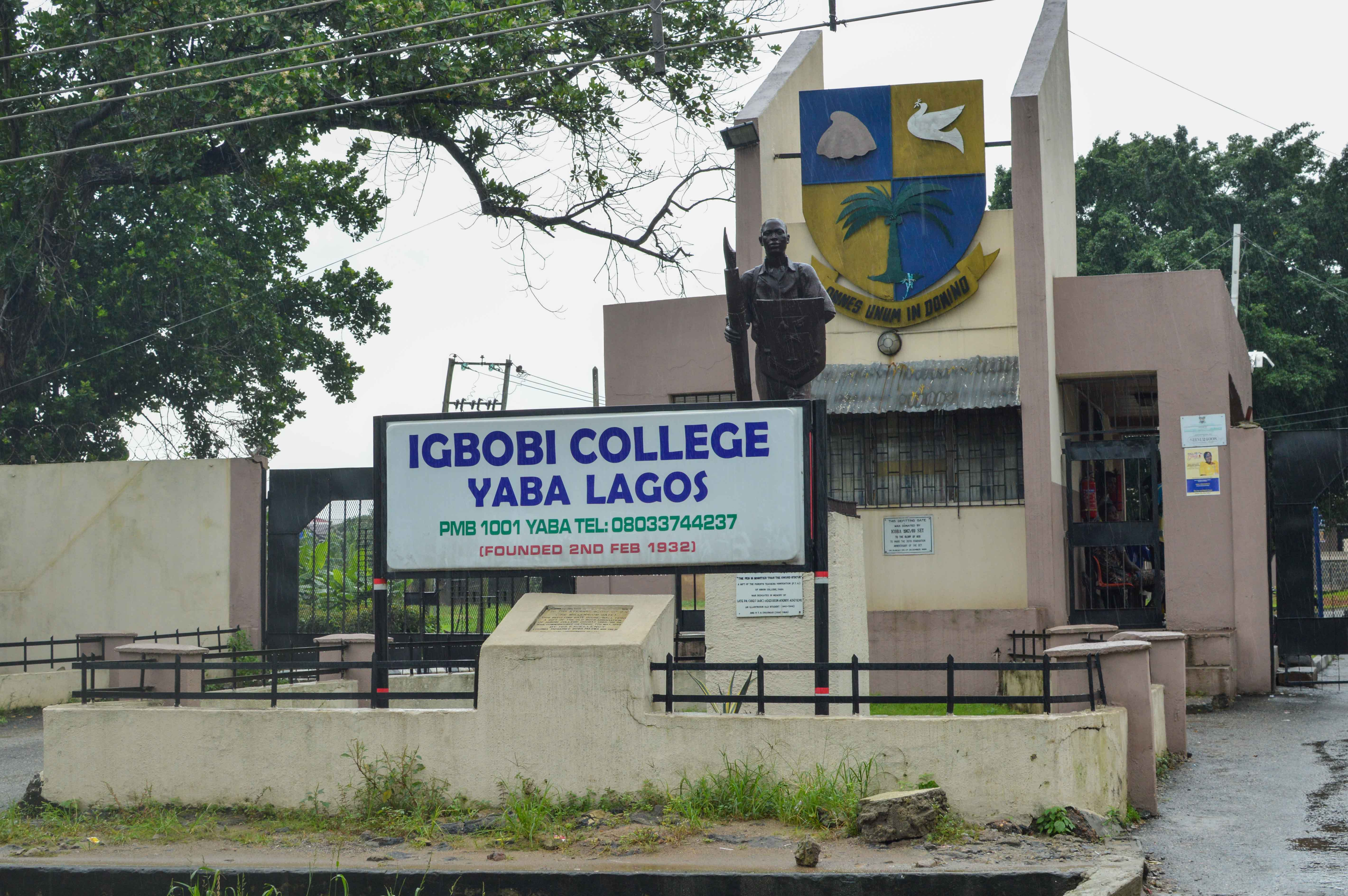
Front view of Igbobi college

John Nelson-Williams attended the Government Model School in Freetown until the age of seven. In 1939 at the age of seven, Nelson-Williams and his family immigrated to Nigeria where his father practiced as a magistrate in the colonial court system.

John Nelson-Williams was partly educated at Igbobi College in Lagos, Nigeria as were his four siblings.

He subsequently returned to Sierra Leone where he was educated at the Methodist Boys High School in Freetown, Sierra Leone where served as editor of the school magazine. After graduating from the Methodist Boys High School, he decided against a professional career in law or medicine and entered into national politics.

== Political life and career ==
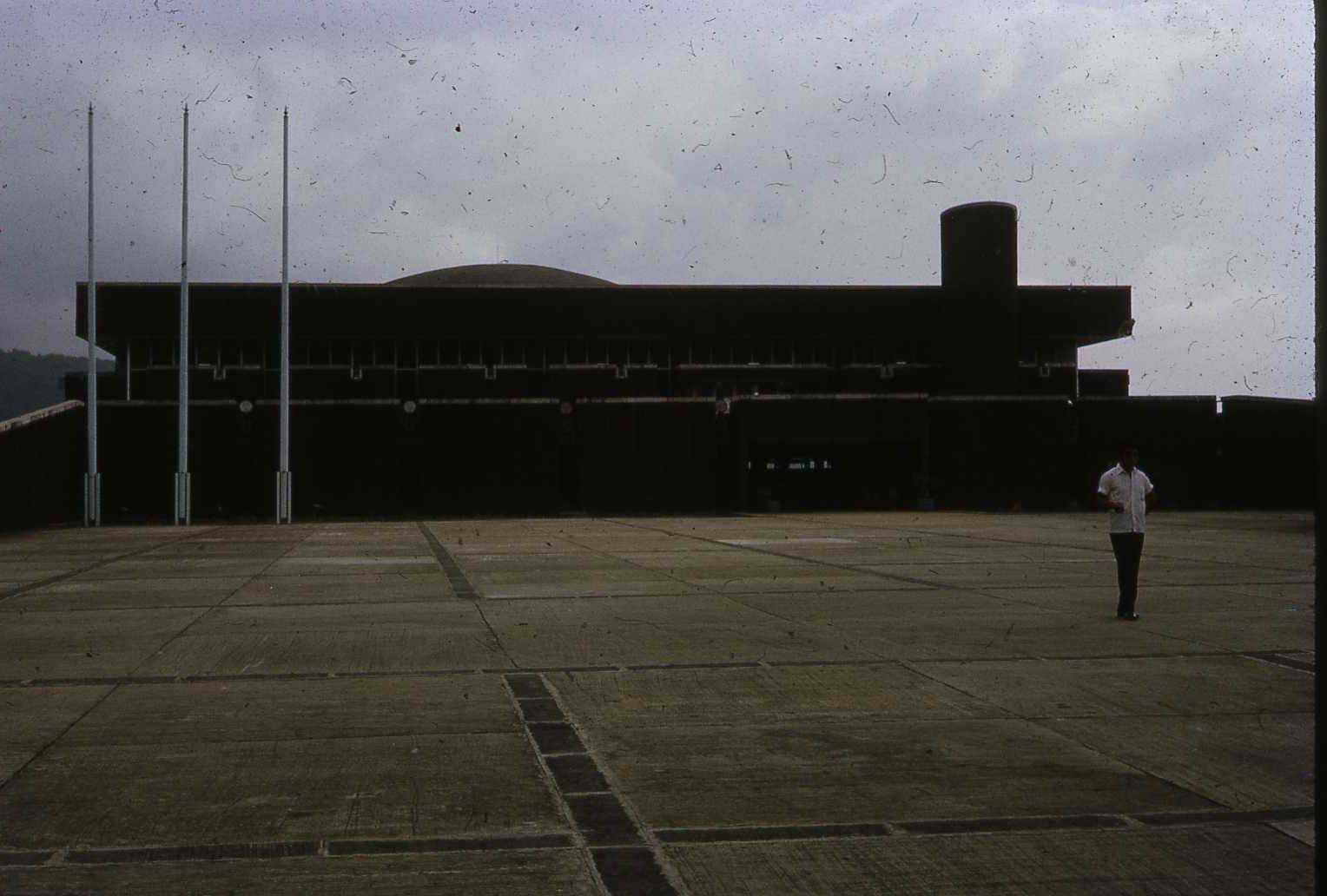
Sierra Leone House of Parliament

John Nelson-Williams initially joined the UPP and then the Sierra Leone Peoples Party or SLPP Party. He then formed the PNP and then returned to the SLPP.

For most of his political career, John Nelson-Williams, alongside his elder brother, Claude Nelson-Williams, was a stalwart of the Sierra Leone People's Party until the 1967 elections.

The Nelson-William brothers followed a family tradition of participation in the colonial politics of Sierra Leone, previously on the Freetown City Council and on the Legislative Council of the colony.

=== Political activities in the United Progressive Party (UPP) ===
The dichotomy between the Colony of Sierra Leone and the Sierra Leone Protectorate was the main aspect of political dynamics in the decolonization period in Sierra Leone.

A younger generation of Creole intellectuals and politically-minded individuals such as Dr Raymond Sarif Easmon, Thomas Decker, Noah Arthur Cox-George, although strongly attached to the Creole upper and middle classes, also adopted a new approach to political discourse and engagement than older politicians such as Ernest Beoku-Betts, Isaac Wallace-Johnson, Herbert Bankole-Bright and the grassroots movements such as the Settlers Descendants Union.

John Nelson-Williams initially joined the UPP which was headed by Cyril Rogers-Wright, a Creole lawyer and politician. The UPP attracted veteran Creole politicians such as I.T.A. Wallace-Johnson and several young Creoles including Clifford Nelson Fyle who served under John Nelson-Williams and Cyril Rogers-Wright.

=== Political activities in the Independent Progressive Party (IPP) ===
John Nelson-Williams served as Secretary General of the United Progressive Party. However, after falling out with Rogers-Wright, Nelson-Williams formed the Independent Progressive Party or IPP with other Creole politicians.

Nelson-Williams joined the United National Front (UNF) and formed part of the first Cabinet of Sierra Leone as part of a cross-partyl coalition government under the UNF. However, eventually Nelson-Williams merged his party with the Sierra Leone People's Party.

In contrast to John Nelson-Williams, his elder brother, Claude Nelson-Williams, was among the original members of the People's National Party or PNP in the 1960s.

The PNP was a younger and more radical segment of the SLPP party composed of members who were loyal to Sir Albert Margai. The PNP would eventually merge into the SLPP and John Nelson-Williams also joined the SLPP.

=== Election to Parliament and participation in the United National Front (UNF) (1957-1961) ===
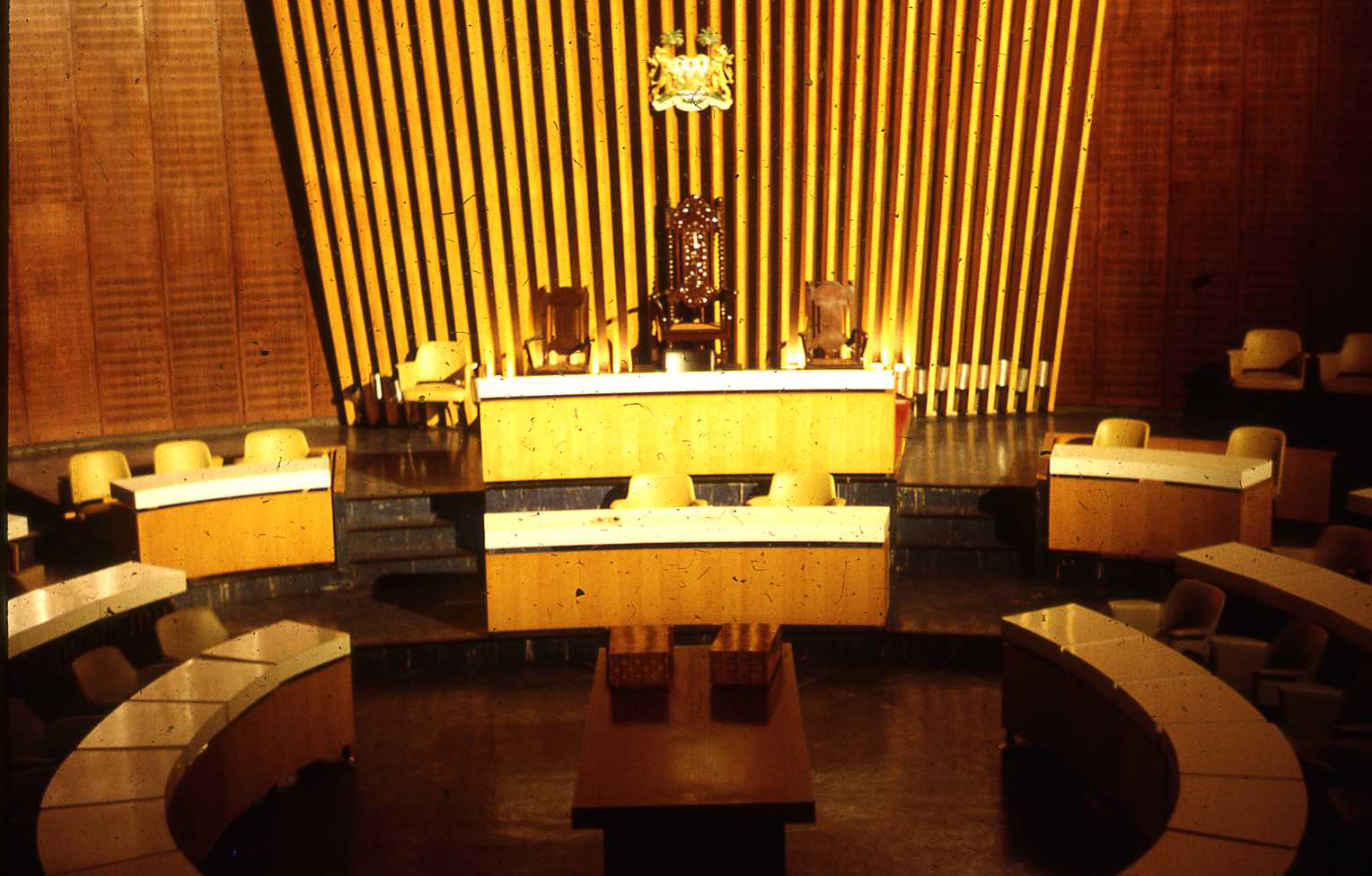
Chamber of the Parliament

John Nelson-Williams was first elected to the Sierra Leone Parliament in May 1957 and represented the Freetown Central Constituency.

As a member of Parliament, John Nelson-Williams and the IPP joined the United National Front which was a cross-party coalition established before the independence of Sierra Leone to unite the members of different political parties to negotiate the terms of the independence settlement.

He was shortly thereafter appointed as a Junior Minister and was the first Minister of Information and Broadcasting in Sierra Leone.

He won re-election in May 1962 and was subsequently reappointed as the Minister of Information and Broadcasting.

=== Minister of Information and Broadcasting (1961-1967) ===
John Nelson-Williams was elected to the Sierra Leone Parliament and held a cabinet position as the first Minister of Information and Broadcasting in Sierra Leone.

As Minister of Information and Broadcasting, John Nelson-Williams sought to establish a premier broadcasting service in Sierra Leone. He engaged international broadcasters including the BBC and corporate firms such as Philips to promote the widespread use of radios and the gradual introduction of televisions across Freetown.

Nelson-Williams was able to attract investment for his plans on the continent and abroad but faced internal opposition from his political counterparts such as John Akar.

Nelson-Williams sought to promote broadcast television across the country and engaged extensively with executives at the BBC to remodel the SLBS as a television broadcasting service.

== 1967 Elections ==
Following the 1967 Sierra Leonean general election, John Nelson-Williams did not retain his Parliamentary seat in an election that saw the Sierra Leone People's Party lose power until the 1990s and early 2000s. Nelson-Williams lost the election to Joe Hadson-Taylor, a Creole businessman and former city councillor.

Nelson-Williams subsequently settled in Thornbury Road, Clapham where he permanently retired from Sierra Leone politics and died in 2008.

== Sources ==
- John R. Cartwright, Politics in Sierra Leone 1947-1967, (Toronto: University of Toronto Press, 1970).
- C. Magbaily Fyle, Historical Dictionary of Sierra Leone, (Lanham: Scarecrow Press, 2006), pp. 47-48.
- Murray Last, (Ed.) Paul Richards, (Ed.), Christopher Fyfe, (Ed.), Sierra Leone, 1787-1987: Two Centuries of Intellectual Life, (Manchester: Manchester University Press, 1987).
- Arthur Porter, Creoledom: A study of the development of Freetown society, (Cambridge: Cambridge University Press, 1963).
- Akintola Wyse, H. C. Bankole-Bright and Politics in Colonial Sierra Leone, 1919-1958, (Cambridge: Cambridge University Press, 2003).
- Patricia A. Holmes, Broadcasting in Sierra Leone, (Lanham: University Press of America, 1999).
- Kosonike Koso-Thomas, The Winding Road: An Autobiography, (Howson Services, 2008).
- Report of the Forster Commission of Inquiry on Assets of Ex-Ministers and Ex-Duty Ministers, (Sierra Leone: Government Printer, 1967).
- Brian Nelson-Williams NO v Jallohn-Williams and Another (CIV APP 69 of 2018) [2020] SLCA 6 (12 June 2020) URL: https://sierralii.gov.sl/akn/sl/judgment/slca/2020/6/eng@2020-06-12
- Michael Jackson, In Sierra Leone, (North Carolina: Duke University Press, 2004).
