= Claude Nelson-Williams =

Sierra Leonean physician and politician

- Claude Nelson-Williams
- Born: Thomas Claudius Nelson-Williams; 30 May 1927; Freetown, Sierra Leone
- Died: 10 April 1989 (aged 61); Freetown, Sierra Leone
- Education: Durham University (MBBS, King's College, Durham) (now part of the Newcastle University)
- Occupations: Medical doctor; politician; social advocate; civic leader
- Relatives: Honourable John Nelson-Williams (brother); General Alfred Nelson-Williams (paternal cousin); James Blyden Jenkins-Johnston (maternal cousin); Justice Claudia Taylor (paternal cousin)

Thomas Claudius Nelson-Williams, MBBS (30 May 1927 – 10 April 1989), commonly known as Claude Nelson-Williams was a Sierra Leonean medical doctor, politician, and civic leader who was active in the politics of Sierra Leone between the 1960s and 1980s.

Born into a professional family that was active in colonial politics in Sierra Leone, Nelson-Williams was among the early postcolonial professionals to participate in Sierra Leonean politics and he was active in SLPP politics and on the Freetown City Council. Alongside other professionals such as Gershon Collier and Raymond Sarif Easmon, he was among a small group of Creole professionals active in the political scene from the 1960s.

He served as Chairman of the Management Committee of the Freetown City Council and ran for Parliament on at least three occasions. He also served as a director of the Bank of Sierra Leone in the 1960s.

His assassination in early 1989 reverberated across West Africa and sent shockwaves in Sierra Leone, especially in the Creole community and among his professional and political peers.

== Background and early life ==
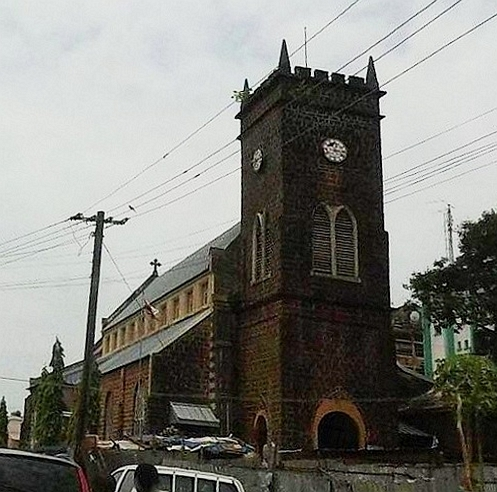
St. George's Cathedral, Freetown

Claude Nelson-Williams was born on 30 May 1927 at 37 Percival Street, Freetown, Sierra Leone. He was registered at birth with the full name of "Thomas Claudius Nelson-Williams." However, from an early age, he was simply known as "Claude Nelson-Williams" and officially as "Thomas Claude Nelson-Williams."

He was the second of five children born to Thomas Edward Nelson-Williams (1894-1960), a barrister, and Malphina Dorothea Nelson-Williams, née Jenkins-Johnston (1904-1989), a teacher and nurse. Although the family subsequently immigrated to Nigeria in 1939, all of his four siblings were born in Freetown and three qualified as professionals namely as lawyers and in the teaching profession. The family resided at Murray Town on the family estate called "Dorolene" which is where Claude Nelson-Williams and his siblings grew up during their childhood in Sierra Leone. His parents belonged to the Creole ethnic group, the descendants of free and formerly enslaved people of African descent and came from prominent Freetown families engaged in colonial politics. Thomas Edward Nelson-Williams was a Wesleyan Methodist and was affiliated with Wesley Church, Freetown. Malphina Nelson-Williams was born into an Anglican family and was affiliated with St George's Cathedral in Freetown.

Thomas Edward Nelson-Williams was a lawyer who studied and qualified as a barrister in Britain. He was a contemporary of Sierra Leonean professionals and politicians including Claude Emile Wright, Ernest Samuel Beoku-Betts and Salako Benka-Coker. He was a close friend of both Claude Emile Wright and Salako Benka-Coker both of whom distinguished themselves at the Sierra Leone Bar. Thomas Nelson-Williams served as a city councillor on the Freetown City Council and subsequently was elected as an Unofficial Member to the Legislative Council of the colony. Thomas Edward Nelson-Williams was also a prominent freemason, which was an important pastime among Creole men, although his son, Claude Nelson-Williams did not participate in freemasonry.

Malphina Nelson-Williams was a teacher who taught at several schools in Freetown. She subsequently qualified as a Registered Nurse in England and was also actively involved with the women's movement in Sierra Leone alongside other Creole political and civil leaders such as Constance Agatha Cummings-John.

== Education ==
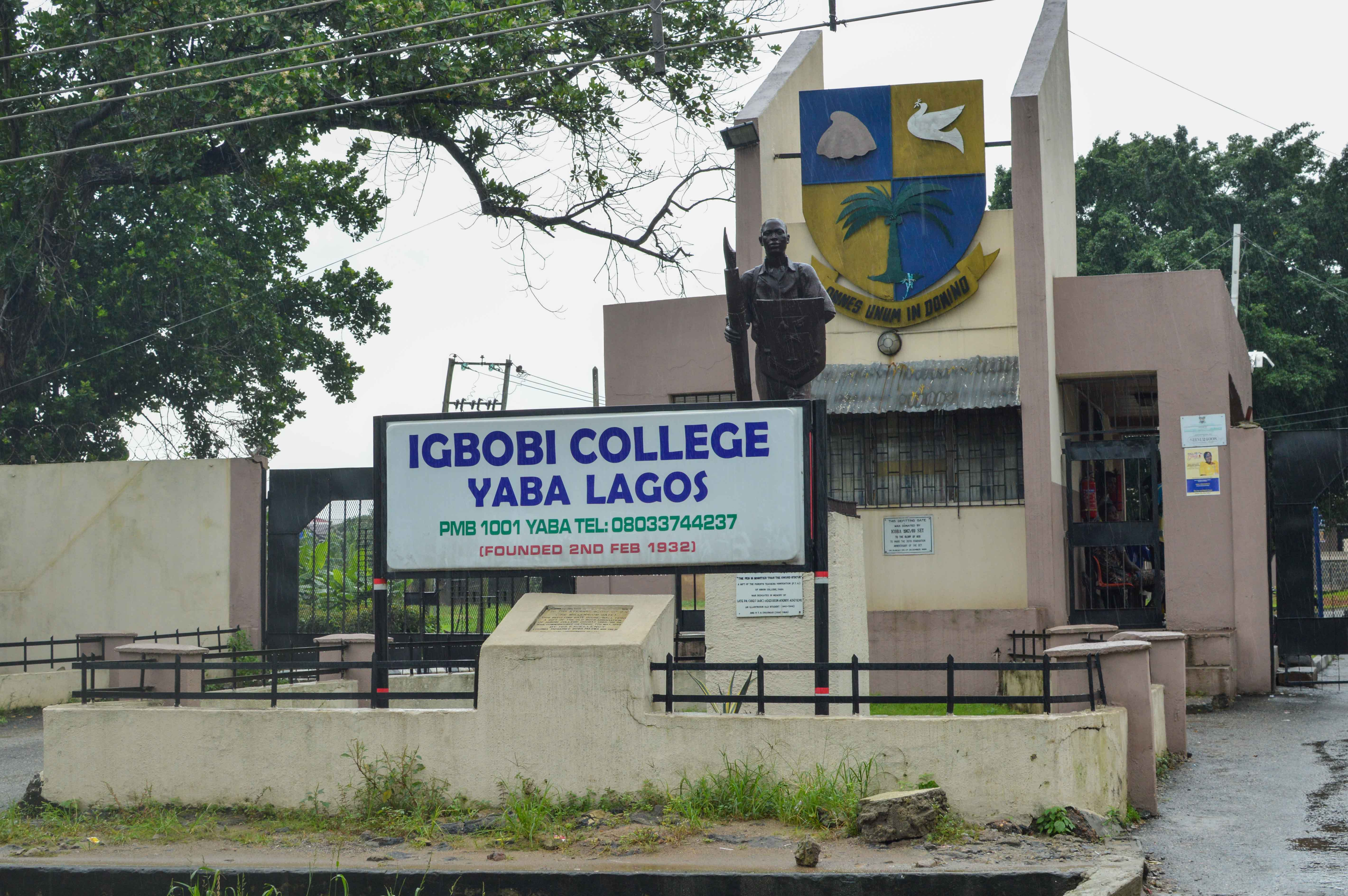
Front view of Igbobi college

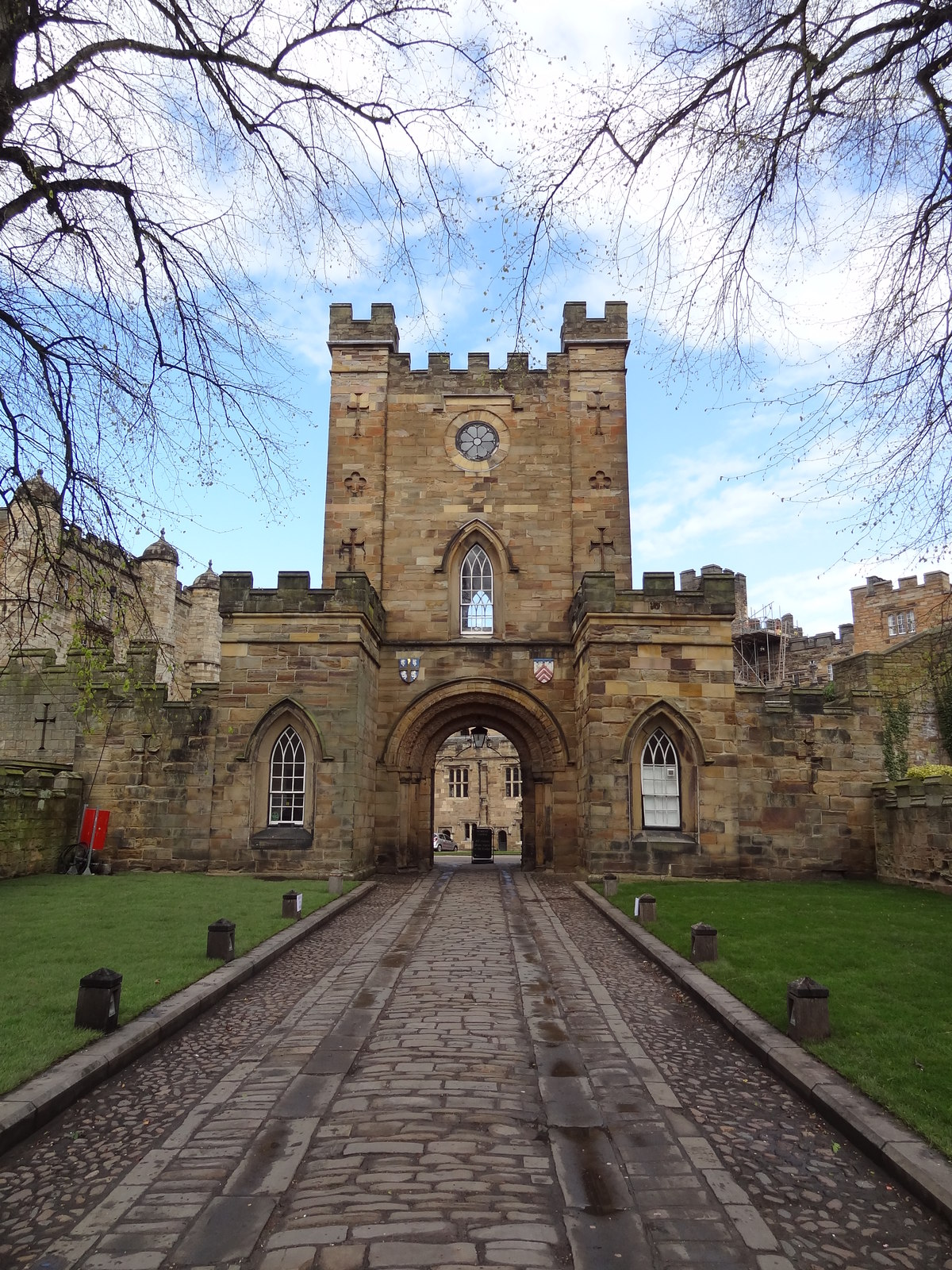
Durham Castle Gatehouse

Nelson-Williams was educated at Bathurst Street Primary School and subsequently at Samaria Church School and the Government Model School in Freetown, Sierra Leone. Samaria Church School was affiliated to Samaria Church which had been established by Liberated Africans. The Government Model School was operated by the British colonial government. In colonial Sierra Leone, education was predominantly provided by local church schools at the primary school level in addition to government operated schools. The religious schools were predominantly Anglican or Methodist but also included schools provided by the Countess of Huntingdon Connection. These schools were largely attended by the small Creole population based in the former Colony of Sierra Leone.

When his family immigrated to Nigeria in 1939 where his father practiced as a lawyer and judge, Nelson-Williams was educated at Igbobi College in Lagos, Nigeria. Igbobi College was an elite school that attracted prominent members of the Lagosian Yoruba middle class. Nelson-Williams attended this school alongside his older brother, Horatio James Edward Nelson-Williams (1925-1955), who subsequently proceeded to study law at Brasenose College at the University of Oxford and qualified as a barrister. His three other siblings would also study in Sierra Leone or Britain for higher education.

=== Medical studies ===
Following his studies at Igbobi College, he proceeded to Durham University in England in 1948, where he completed the MBBS degree in Medicine, graduating in 1955 as a member of King's College, which was the medical college at Durham University that eventually formed the Newcastle University. The MBBS degree was a six-year medical qualification that provided students with the qualifications to complete a house residency in medicine.

Durham University had a long-standing relationship with Sierra Leone through its affiliation with Fourah Bay College in 1876. The provisions of this arrangement provided Sierra Leoneans with the opportunity to complete a Durham University degree at Fourah Bay College. Thomas Edward Nelson-Williams, the father of Nelson-Williams, had completed his first degree at Fourah Bay College. Several other prominent Sierra Leoneans including Sir Milton Margai, the first Prime Minister of Sierra Leone, Robert Wellesley-Cole, the first West African to qualify as a surgeon at the Royal College of Surgeons in England, and Raymond Sarif Easmon a medical doctor and accomplished playwright, completed their medical studies at Durham University which was affiliated to Fourah Bay College until 1960.

== Medical career ==
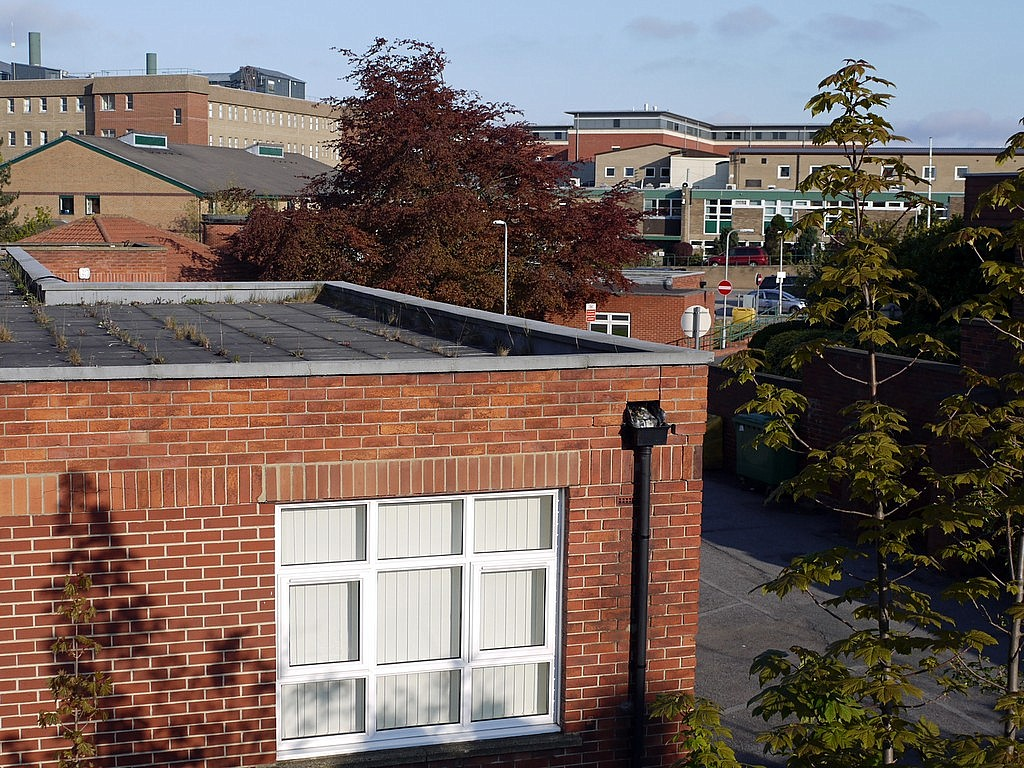
Queen Elizabeth Hospital

Following his studies at Durham University, Nelson-Williams entered his house residency at Queen Elizabeth Hospital in Gateshead where he was senior house officer and casualty officer. It was at this time that he was listed on the Medical Register of physicians qualified to practice medicine.

After his house residency at Queen Elizabeth Hospital, Nelson-Williams returned to Freetown, Sierra Leone where he served as medical officer at Fourah Bay College Hospital.

He subsequently entered private practice as a physician at 33 Pultney Street, Freetown where he held retainers with several corporate companies including the United Africa Company and the Sierra Leone Commercial Bank.

Nelson-Williams served as president of the Sierra Leone Medical Association between 1958 and 1959. The Medical Association was one of several professional bodies such as the Sierra Leone Bar Association that had been established by professionals in Sierra Leone.

== Political life and career ==
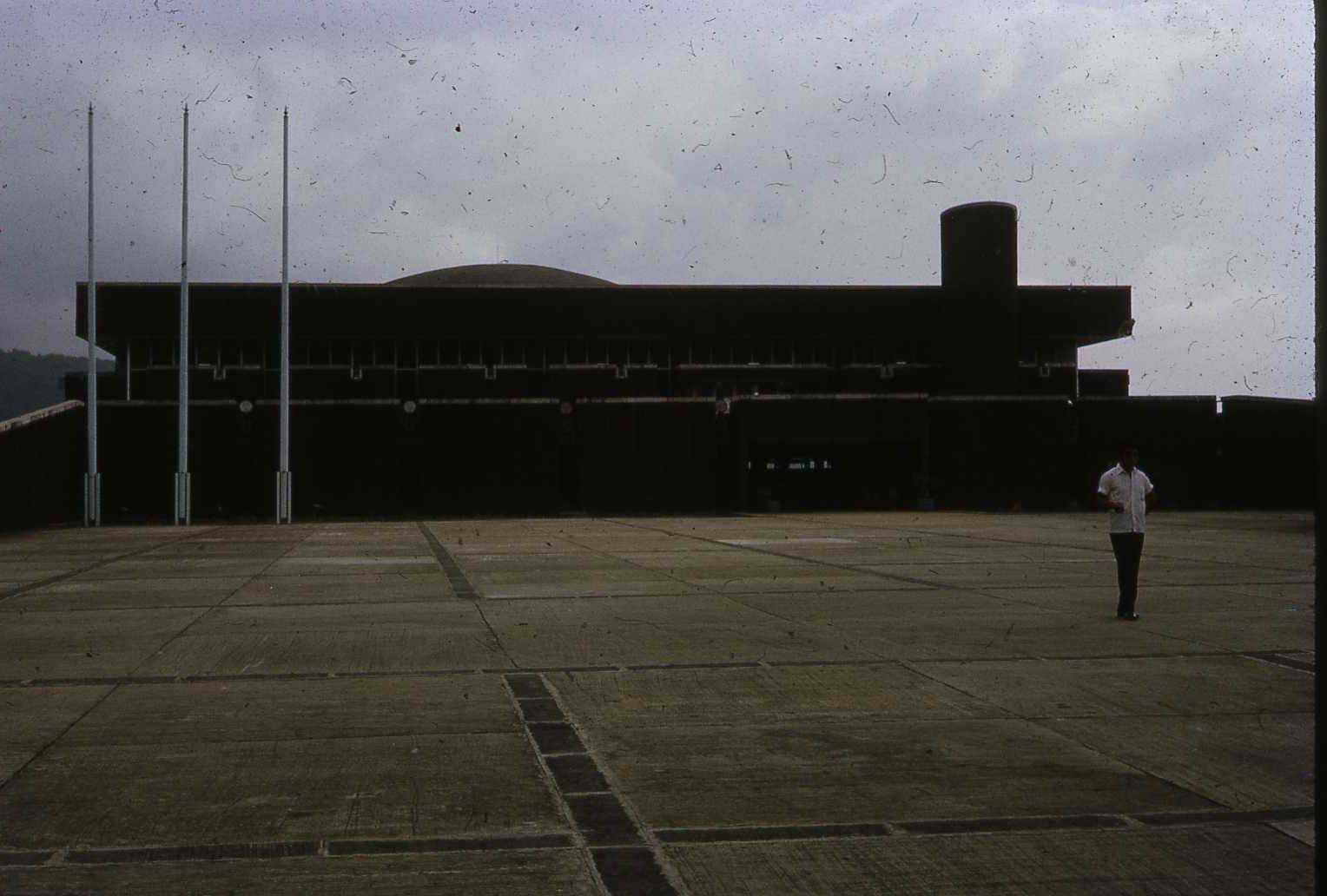
Sierra Leone House of Parliament

Nelson-Williams and his younger brother, John Arnold Nelson-Williams (1932-2008), were active in Sierra Leonean politics. John was elected to the Sierra Leone Parliament and held a cabinet position as Minister of Information and Broadcasting. Although Claude was never elected to Parliament nor held a cabinet position, in comparison to the small number of Creole professionals actively involved in postcolonial politics, he had a significant degree of influence in Sierra Leonean politics during the 1960s and maintained some political clout from then onwards.

The participation of the Nelson-William brothers in politics was part of a lengthy tradition of Creole professionals participating in politics. Several Creole politicians and political commentators such as Albert Whiggs Easmon, Emmanuel Cummings, Herbert Bankole-Bright, Ernest Beoku-Betts, and Eustace Henry Taylor Cummings were also accomplished medical and legal professionals who studied in Britain. This Creole political elite largely dominated institutions such as the Freetown City Council and the Legislative Council of the colony.

The Nelson-Williams and Jenkins-Johnston families also had a storied tradition of participation in the colonial politics of Sierra Leone namely on the Freetown City Council and on the Legislative Council of the colony. Thomas Edward Nelson-Williams, the father of the Nelson-William brothers, served as a councilor on the Freetown City Council and subsequently served on the Legislative Council. James Jenkins Johnston, the father of Malphina Nelson-Williams, also served as a councilor on the Freetown City Council, and Malphina's younger brother, James Jenkins-Johnston served on the Freetown Council as well. James Blyden Jenkins-Johnston, a cousin of the Nelson-Williams brothers, was a City Solicitor or Legal Adviser to the Freetown City Council and also served as a Member of the Freetown City Council Committee of Management between 1983 and 1989.

=== SLPP Member and founding member of the PNP ===
Claude Nelson-Williams as Chairman of the FCC Management Committee

The politics of the decolonization era and immediate postcolonial era were characterized by a dichotomy between the inhabitants of the Colony of Sierra Leone and the peoples of the Sierra Leone Protectorate. Although the colony was inhabited by the Creoles and the Okus and the Protectorate comprised several ethnic groups including the Mende, Temne, and Limba, scholarship largely focuses on the political cleavage between the Creoles and the inhabitants of the Sierra Leone Protectorate more generically. However, despite the politically intractable positions between segments of the Creole community and the ethnic groups in the hinterland, younger Creoles such as Claude Nelson-Williams and John Nelson Williams, without compromising their position as part of the Creole professional upper class, sought to participate in national politics from a more inclusive angle than that of some of their older Creole professional counterparts.

Young Creole intellectuals and professionals such as Raymond Sarif Easmon, Thomas Decker, Noah Arthur Cox-George, alongside the Nelson-Williams brothers, although part of the Creole upper and middle classes, engaged with other political groupings from different position than the older generation of Creole politicians such as Herbert Bankole-Bright and the grassroots movements such as the Settlers Descendants Union.

Although initially affiliated with the UPP and then the Sierra Leone Peoples Party or SLPP Party, Claude Nelson-Williams, was a founding member of the People's National Party or PNP in the late 1950s and 1960s. Claude Nelson-Williams served on the Executive Council of the PNP alongside his close friend, Gershon Collier. The PNP was a radical element of the SLPP party composed of more youthful members including a younger generation of Creoles who were aligned with Sir Albert Margai, a lawyer who was the younger brother of Sir Milton Margai. However, the PNP subsequently merged into the SLPP and Claude Nelson-Williams also returned to the SLPP.

=== Chairman of the Management Committee of the Freetown City Council (FCC) (1964) ===
Following the resignation of the mayor and city council of Freetown in 1964, Claude Nelson-Williams was appointed to serve as Chairman of the Management Committee of the Freetown City Council in 1964. He served in this capacity until Siaka Stevens was formally elected to the mayoralty of Freetown.

=== Running for parliamentary office ===
Nelson-Williams ran unsuccessfully as an independent candidate for the Sierra Leone Parliament in 1962, ran as an SLPP flagbearer in 1967, and also ran as a candidate in 1985. He ran to be a member of Parliament for the Wilberforce, Sierra Leone district in 1962 and lost the election to Cyril Rogers-Wright, a Creole lawyer, who was the SLPP flagbearer. He then ran as an SLPP flagbearer at the 1967 elections in which the SLPP was widely reported as having lost the election.

Almost twenty years later in 1985, Nelson-Williams ran for the Parliamentary seat in the Freetown West III constituency against candidates including Franklyn Ernest David Cline-Thomas, a Creole retired civil servant and businessman commonly known as 'Teddy' or 'F.E.D. Cline-Thomas', Mohamed Sallu Thomas, an Oku former civil servant, and Osman Kamara, a pharmacist and ultimately lost the election to Kamara.

== Achievements and recognition ==
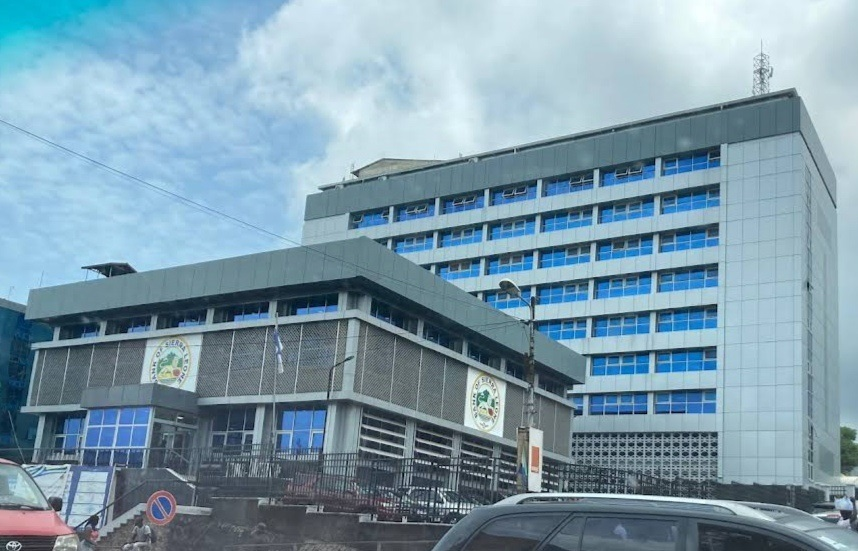
Bank of Sierra Leone

Claude Nelson-Williams was appointed as a director of the Bank of Sierra Leone in 1964 and served in this role until 1967 when he resigned from the directorship.

He served in leadership roles in both professional and leisurely associations including as president of the Sierra Leone Medical Association and president of the Sierra Leone Lawn Tennis Association.

=== Business interests ===
Nelson-Williams also had several business interests including shares in the Marble Tile Construction Company Limited and Ma Cherie Limited. He was also a shareholder and the managing director of the Sabanoh Pharmaceuticals Limited company in the 1970s.

Through his commercial endeavors, Nelson-Williams made several donations to civic causes. As managing director of the Sabanoh Pharmaceutical Limited company, he donated several packages of drugs for the extension of Maforki Hospital in Port Loko in the 1970s. As a shareholder of the Marble Tile Construction Company Limited, he donated to the OAU Fund which was to finance preparations for Sierra Leone hosting the Organisation of African Unity Summit in 1980.

== Later life ==
Claude Nelson-Williams with medical professionals

Nelson-Williams was a lifelong Wesleyan Methodist and a member of Wesley Methodist Church at Lamina Sankoh Street (formerly Trelawney Street), which was the family church of his paternal family.

In the latter years of his life, outside of his medical practice and business interests, Nelson-Williams spent time in the company of a small group of like-minded professional friends at the Brookfields Hotel.

=== Political activism and social advocacy in the latter years ===
Although Nelson-Williams retained an interest in election to Parliament, he also had a strong role as a social advocate in the latter years of his life. He remained a vocal critic of the governments of Siaka Stevens and Joseph Saidu Momoh in the 1970s and 1980s.

The rampant corruption and state-sanctioned violence evidenced by the execution of Mohamed Sorie Forna and the assassination of Samuel Lansana Bangura, which was allegedly sanctioned by the Sierra Leonean government, was fiercely criticized by Sierra Leoneans such as Nelson-Williams and Raymond Sarif Easmon. Easmon was briefly jailed by the Siaka Stevens government in the 1970s and eventually was convinced by family and friends to tone down his criticisms of the Siaka Stevens government. Nelson-Williams would remain a critic of corruption and violence by the state and some reports at the time of his death outline that the Sierra Leonean government was wary of his critiques.

== Assassination ==
On April 10, 1989, Nelson-Williams was assassinated in his home at Spur Road, Freetown by Abayomi Alhadi, a Sierra Leonean state-sponsored contract killer from the Oku community in Freetown, who was commonly known by his alias of "Highway". Alhadi had been accused of the 1979 assassination of Samuel Lansana Bangura, a Governor of the Bank of Sierra Leone, who was a personal friend of Nelson-Williams.

The assassination of Nelson-Williams was a significant shock in Sierra Leone and evidenced the increasing violence that came to characterize aspects of Sierra Leonean society before the Sierra Leone Civil War.

=== Aftermath ===
Following a trial for the assassination of Nelson-Williams, Alhadi was sentenced to death in 1992 alongside four other accessories to the assassination. Alhadi was subsequently scheduled to be executed following his conviction for the assassination of Nelson-Williams, but was granted clemency and had his sentence commuted to life imprisonment by the government. Alhadi was subsequently killed by peacekeeping forces in 1997 during the Sierra Leone Civil War.

Following a funeral service at Wesley Methodist Church on 16 April 1989, Nelson-Williams was buried at King Tom Cemetery in the West End of Freetown. He was survived by his family including his three younger siblings.

== Legacy ==
Scholars of the history and politics of Sierra Leone cite Sierra Leonean politicians and professionals such as Claude Nelson-Williams, Berthan Macaulay, Raymond Sarif Easmon, John Karefa-Smart, Mohamed Sorie Forna, Ibrahim Bash Taqi, and Gershon Collier as part of the early postcolonial politicians and civic leaders who championed the rights of Sierra Leoneans and railed against the emergence of a kleptocracy, state-sanctioned violence, and corruption.

As part of the Creole minority, Sierra Leoneans such as Claude Nelson-Williams and his brother, John, Berthan Macaulay, and Raymond Sarif Easmon were part of the radical Creole politicians who, in contrast to the gradual trend of declining Creole influence in politics, played a vibrant and influential role in the postcolonial political landscape of Sierra Leone. These younger generation of Sierra Leoneans combined professional achievement with civic and political leadership, and in the one-party state paid with their lives or were imprisoned.

== Sources ==
- "Nelson-Williams, Dr Claude," Africa's Who Who, (Africa Journal Limited, 1991), p. 1253.
- The Medical Directory: London, Provinces, Wales, Scotland, Ireland, Abroad, Navy, Army & Air Force, Volume 123, Part 2, (London: J. & A. Churchill, Limited, 1967), 1758.
- Medical Directory, Part 2, (London: Churchill Livingstone., 1957).
- The Sierra Leone Gazette, Volume 98, (Sierra Leone: Government Printer, 1967), 401.
- John R. Cartwright, Politics in Sierra Leone 1947-1967, (Toronto: University of Toronto Press, 1970).
- C. Magbaily Fyle, Historical Dictionary of Sierra Leone, (Lanham: Scarecrow Press, 2006), pp. 47–48.
- Murray Last, (Ed.) Paul Richards, (Ed.), Christopher Fyfe, (Ed.), Sierra Leone, 1787-1987: Two Centuries of Intellectual Life, (Manchester: Manchester University Press, 1987).
- Thomas C. Nelson-Williams v Cyril B. Rogers-Wright (24 of 1962) [1962] SLSC 24 (13 August 1962).
- Arthur Porter, Creoledom: A study of the development of Freetown society, (Cambridge: Cambridge University Press, 1963).
- Akintola Wyse, H. C. Bankole-Bright and Politics in Colonial Sierra Leone, 1919-1958, (Cambridge: Cambridge University Press, 2003).
- Sierra Leone: 12 Years of Economic Achievement and Political Consolidation Under the APC and Dr. Siaka Stevens, 1968-1980, (Sierra Leone: Office of the President, 1980), 276, 552.
