= Claudia Taylor (Sierra Leone) =

Sierra Leonean judge and lawyer

Hon. Justice Claudia Taylor
- Hon. Justice Claudia Taylor
- Born: Claudia Taylor; 16 March 1943; Freetown, Sierra Leone
- Died: 26 November 2015 (aged 72); Freetown, Sierra Leone
- Education: Methodist Girls High School in Freetown, University of London (Bachelor of Arts), Middle Temple
- Occupations: Judge; lawyer
- Relatives: General Alfred Nelson-Williams (brother), Dr Claude Nelson-Williams (paternal cousin), Honourable John Nelson-Williams (paternal cousin)

Claudia Taylor, (née Nelson-Williams;16 March 1943 – 26 November 2015), was a Sierra Leonean judge and lawyer who served as a justice on the High Court of Sierra Leone and previously as a magistrate.

Taylor was an active supporter and pioneer of women's rights and was involved in advocating for female lawyers in the legal profession. She was a founding member and the first president of the Legal Access through Women Yearning for Equality Rights and Social Justice (L.A.W.Y.E.R.S).

== Background and early life ==
Claudia Nelson-Williams was born on 16 March 1943 at Number 77 Pademba Road, Freetown.

Nelson-Williams was the second of two daughters born to Arthur Claudius Nelson-Williams, a medical dispenser, and Beatrice Latilewa Nelson-Williams, née Beckley.

Claudia Nelson-Williams was born into a professional family of Creole provenance that was also active in colonial politics in Sierra Leone. She was the seventh member of her family to qualify as a professional and the fifth member to qualify as a barrister in Britain.

Her paternal uncle, Thomas E. Nelson-Williams was a barrister who qualified at the Middle Temple and served as a magistrate in Nigeria. Thomas Nelson-Williams served as a city councillor on the Freetown City Council and subsequently was elected as an Unofficial Member to the Legislative Council of the colony.

Her paternal cousins, Honourable John Nelson-Williams and Dr Claude Nelson-Williams were active in postcolonial politics in Sierra Leone in the 1960s. John Nelson-Williams was a Member of Parliament who served in the first Cabinet of Sierra Leone in 1961 and Claude Nelson-Williams was head of the Freetown City Council in 1964.

== Education ==
Taylor attended local primary schools in Freetown, Sierra Leone before completing her secondary education at the Methodist Girls High School in Freetown.

After completing her education at the Methodist Girls' High School, she subsequently traveled to Britain for further studies in 1960.

== Legal career ==
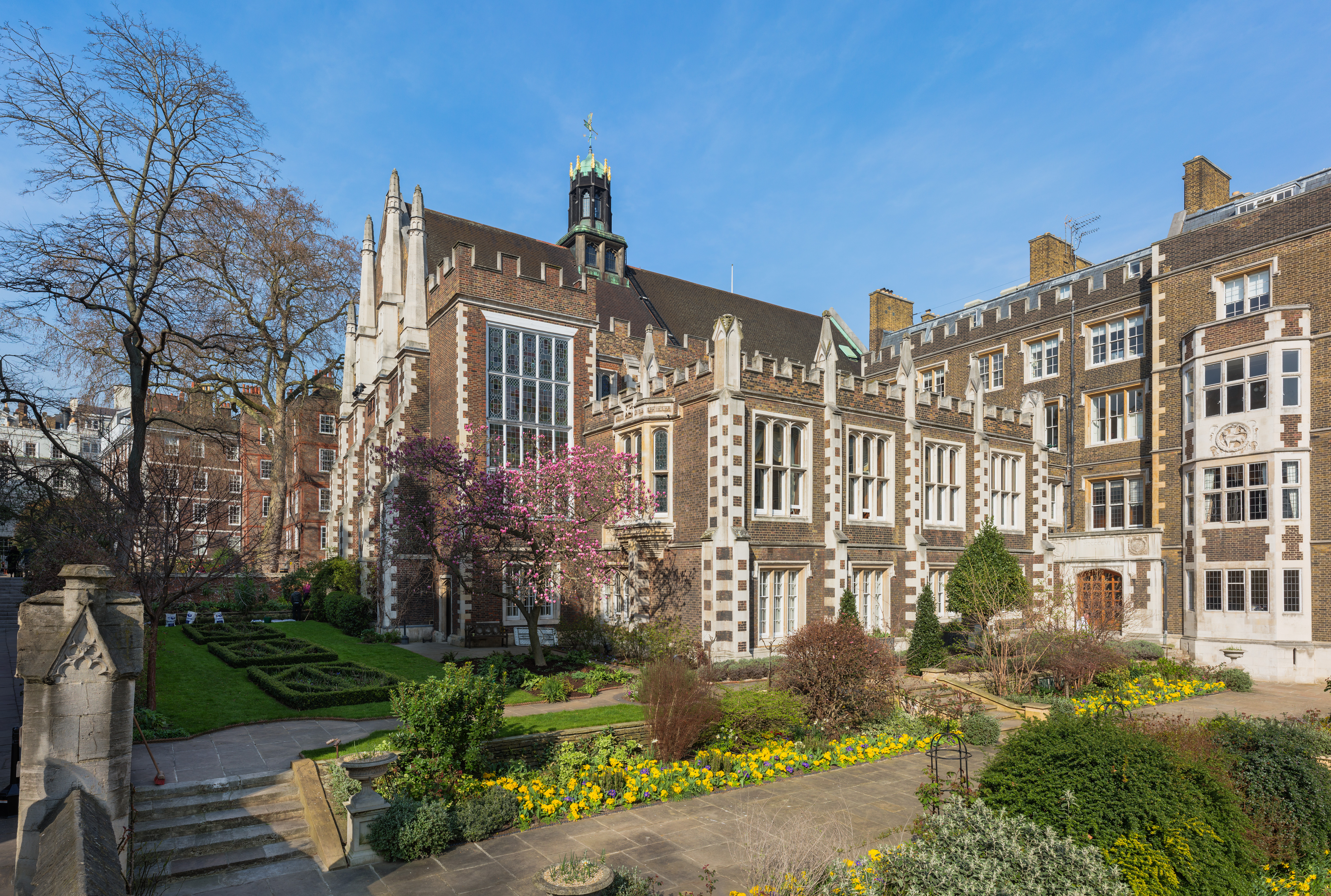
Middle Temple

After attending the University of London and receiving the Bachelor of Laws in 1977, Taylor entered the Middle Temple to qualify as a barrister.

Following three years of study, she qualified as a barrister at the Middle Temple in 1982.

=== Appointment as Magistrate of the Courts of Sierra Leone ===
Claudia Taylor received her first judicial appointment as magistrate of the Courts of Sierra Leone in 1992. Taylor was the second member of her family elevated to the judiciary. She adjudicated on cases in Magistrate court Number 1A in Freetown, Sierra Leone.

As a magistrate, Taylor ruled or had jurisdiction over cases involving journalists during the Sierra Leone Civil War.

She also ruled on the corruption case of Hon. Momoh Pujeh who was arrested under the orders of the Anti-Corruption Commission for illegal diamond mining.

In 2002, as the principal magistrate, Taylor also gave an ultimate for a Lebanese businessman to pay a surety of ten million leones during his trial for brutalizing Susan Torwah, a Sierra Leonean woman.

=== Appointment to the High Court of Sierra Leone ===
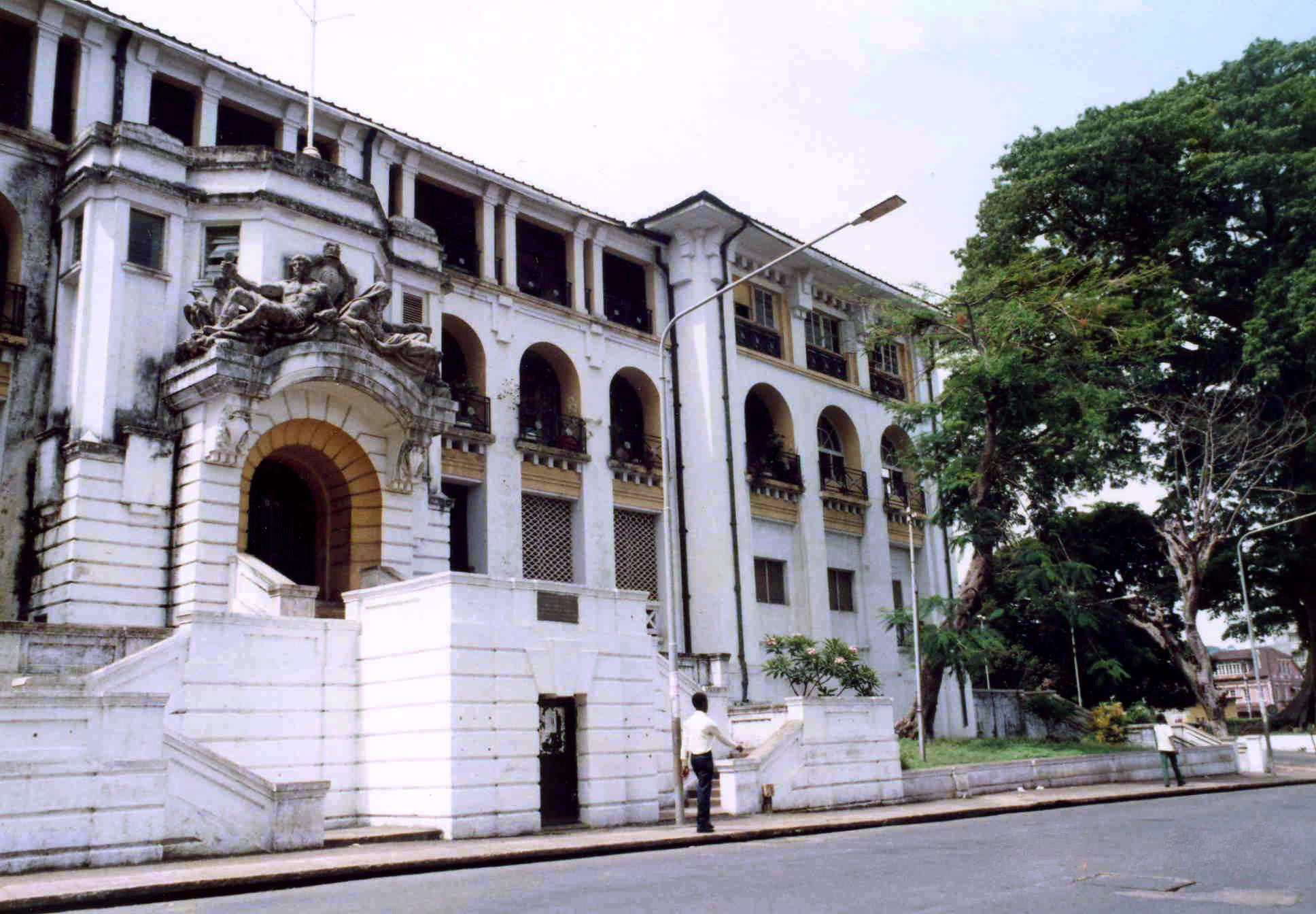
Law Courts, Freetown, Sierra Leone

After serving for twelve years as a magistrate, Taylor was appointed to the High Court of Sierra Leone in 2004.

As a justice of the High Court, Taylor adjudicated the trial concerning the death of Harry Yansanneh, a one-time Acting Editor of the For Di People newspaper who died following a domestic dispute with his landlord, Fatmata Hassan, who was an SLPP Member of Parliament.

Taylor also ruled on the "controversial" chieftaincy elections case between Dr Issa Sheriff and Alusine Sheku Conteh in the Biriwa Limba Chiefdom in Northern Sierra Leone. In dismissing the case, Taylor stated that "it is not the duty of the court to rule on the question of jurisdiction of this matter."

== Retirement from the Judiciary and later life ==
After nearly twenty years of service on the judicial bench, Taylor retired from the judiciary in 2008 and subsequently settled in the United States where she died on 26 November 2015.

== Sources ==
- John R. Cartwright, Politics in Sierra Leone 1947-1967, (Toronto: University of Toronto Press, 1970).
- C. Magbaily Fyle, Historical Dictionary of Sierra Leone, (Lanham: Scarecrow Press, 2006), pp. 47–48.
- Murray Last, (Ed.) Paul Richards, (Ed.), Christopher Fyfe, (Ed.), Sierra Leone, 1787-1987: Two Centuries of Intellectual Life, (Manchester: Manchester University Press, 1987).
- Arthur Porter, Creoledom: A study of the development of Freetown society, (Cambridge: Cambridge University Press, 1963).
- Akintola Wyse, H. C. Bankole-Bright and Politics in Colonial Sierra Leone, 1919-1958, (Cambridge: Cambridge University Press, 2003).
- "Government bows to calls for extradition of MP’s children implicated in editor’s death," RSF/IFEX, URL: https://ifex.org/government-bows-to-calls-for-extradition-of-mps-children-implicated-in-editors-death/
- Appendix 3 – Part Three – Section B, The Truth And Reconciliation Commission (TRC), Transcripts Of Thematic And Institutional Hearings, December 1992, Coup Trials And Executions., URL: https://www.sierraleonetrc.org/index.php/appendices/item/appendix-3-part-3-section-b
- Isata Lebbie, "Sierra Leone: Justice for Killed Journalist," The Independent (Freetown), 14 August 2006, URL: https://allafrica.com/stories/200608141200.html
- Regina Pratt, "Sierra Leone: Principal Assistant Registrar, State Counsel Testify in Yasaneh's Case," Concord Times, August 10, 2006, URL: https://allafrica.com/stories/200608100954.html
- Regina Pratt, "Sierra Leone: Biriwa Chieftaincy Case Dismissed," Concord Times, August 10, 2006, URL: https://allafrica.com/stories/200608100957.html
- "Girls, Women, the Law & Valentine’s Day L.A.W.Y.E.R.S’ 20 years of Serving Society by Protecting Women and Girls Through the Law," AYV News, January 10, 2020, URL: https://ayvnews.com/girls-women-the-law-valentine-s-day-l-a-w-y-e-r-s-20-years-of-serving-society-by-protecting-women-and-girls-through-the-law/
- Unissa Bangura, "Sierra Leone: After 15 Adjournments...Magistrate Turns Down Application," Standard Times (Freetown), 11 September 2002, URL: https://allafrica.com/stories/200209110538.html
- Unissa Bangura , "Sierra Leone: Minister Calls for Conviction of Col. Mani, 5 Others 31 October 2001," Standard Times (Freetown), URL: https://allafrica.com/stories/200110310335.html
- Sulaiman Momodu, "Sierra Leone: How Kabbah Was Under Pressure Over S.B. Marah's Case," Concord Times (Freetown), 11 December 2001, URL: https://allafrica.com/stories/200112110384.html
- "Report of the Special Rapporteur on violence against women, its causes and consequences: Mission to Sierra Leone," UN CHR, 11 February 2002, URL: https://reliefweb.int/report/guinea/report-special-rapporteur-violence-against-women-its-causes-and-consequences-mission
- "Sierra Leone News, July 1999," Sierra Leone Web, URL: https://www.sierra-leone.org/Archives/slnews0799.html
- "Journalists appear before Magistrate Court," Committee to Protect Journalists (CPJ), 1 April 1998, URL: https://ifex.org/journalists-appear-before-magistrate-court/
- "Journalists charged with treason," Committee to Protect Journalists (CPJ), 14 April 1998, URL: https://ifex.org/journalists-charged-with-treason/
- "Maada Maka Swaray: Sierra Leone Broadcasting Service (SLBS) | Imprisoned in Sierra Leone," Committee to Protect Journalists, February 15, 1998, URL: https://cpj.org/data/people/maada-maka-swaray/
- George Wilson, "Sierra Leone: Magistrate Slams Ultimatum On Lebanese," Standard Times (Freetown), 20 July 2002, URL: https://allafrica.com/stories/200207220105.html
