= Chief of the Defence Staff (Sierra Leone) =

Head of the armed forces of Sierra Leone

- Coat of arms of Sierra Leone

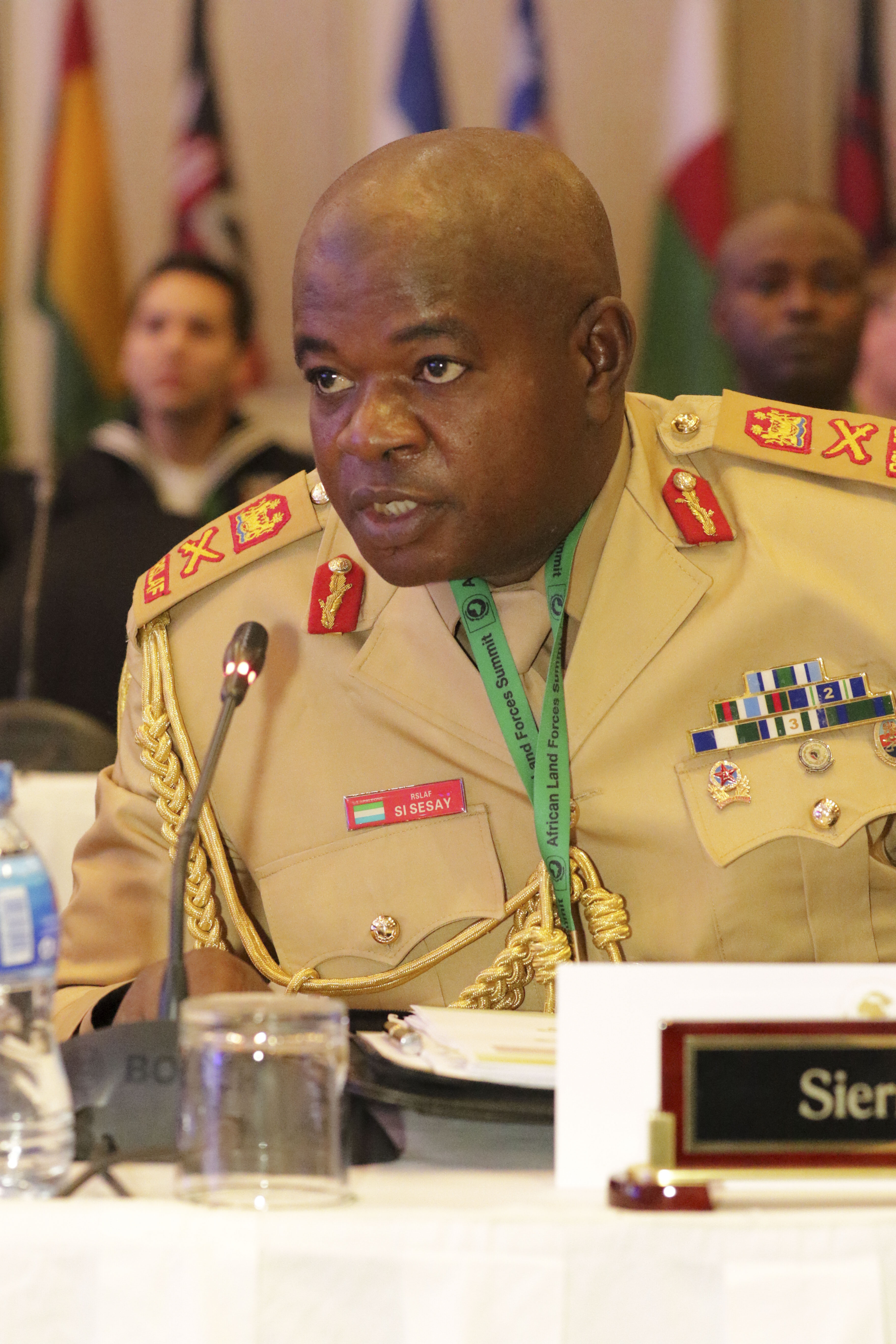
- Incumbent; Lieutenant General Sullay Ibrahim Sesay since 29 June 2020
- Ministry of Defence
- Abbreviation: CDS
- Reports to: Minister of Defence
- Nominator: President of Sierra Leone
- Appointer: Parliament of Sierra Leone
- Formation: 1957
- First holder: R. D. Blakie
- Website: Official website

The Chief of the Defence Staff (CDS) is the professional head of the Republic of Sierra Leone Armed Forces. He is responsible for the administration and the operational control of the Sierra Leonean military. It is the highest rank military position in the country.

In 1985, General Joseph Saidu Momoh, the army commander, succeed President Siaka Stevens. It is not clear what exactly Momoh's title was but it seems likely that he was the senior Sierra Leonean military officer and held the predecessor to the CDS's post.

Brigadier General Tom Carew was Chief of Defence Staff from April 2000 to November 2004. He may have been promoted to Major General during his tenure. Major General Alfred Nelson-Williams was the Chief of the Defence Staff of the Republic of the Armed Forces, between 2008 and 2010. Nelson-Williams succeeded the retiring Major General Edward Sam M'boma on 12 September 2008. The current chief is Lieutenant General Sullay Ibrahim Sesay.

== List of chiefs ==
No.	Picture	Chief of the Defence Staff	Took office	Left office	Time in office	Ref.
1	R. D. Blakie	Brigadier; R. D. Blakie	1962	1964	1–2 years	
2	David Lansana	Brigadier; David Lansana (1922–1975)	1964	1967	2–3 years	
3	Andrew Juxon-Smith	Brigadier; Andrew Juxon-Smith (1931–1996)	1967	1968	0–1 years	
4	John Amadu Bangura	Brigadier; John Amadu Bangura (1930–1971)	1968	1971	2–3 years	
5	Joseph Saidu Momoh	Major General; Joseph Saidu Momoh (1937–2003)	1971	28 November 1985	13–14 years	
6	M.S. Tarawallie	Major General; M.S. Tarawallie	1985	1992	6–7 years	
7	Jusu Gottor	Major General; Jusu Gottor	1992	1994	1–2 years	
8	Kellie Conteh	Brigadier; Kellie Conteh	1994	1995	0–1 years	
9	Julius Maada Bio	Brigadier; Julius Maada Bio (born 1964)	1995	1996	0–1 years	
10	Joy Turay	Brigadier; Joy Turay	1996	1996	0 years	
11	Hassan Conteh	Brigadier; Hassan Conteh	1996	1997	0–1 years	
12	Maxwell Mitikishi Khobe	Brigadier General; Maxwell Mitikishi Khobe (1950–2000)	April 1998	April 2000	2 years	
13	Tom Carew	Major General; Tom Carew	April 2000	November 2004	4 years, 7 months	
14	Edward Sam M'boma	Major General; Edward Sam M'boma	2005	12 September 2008	2–3	
15	Alfred Nelson-Williams	Major General; Alfred Nelson-Williams	12 September 2008	August 2010	1 year, 10 months	
16	Robert Yira Koroma	Major General; Robert Yira Koroma (?–2020)	August 2010	3 July 2012	1 year, 11 months	
17	Samuel Omar Williams	Lieutenant General; Samuel Omar Williams (?–2016)	24 July 2012	April 2016	3 years, 8 months	
18	John Edson Milton	Lieutenant General; John Edson Milton (born 1960)	14 April 2016	29 November 2017	1 year, 229 days	
19	Brima Sesay	Lieutenant General; Brima Sesay (born 1965)	29 November 2017	29 June 2020	2 years, 213 days	
20	Sullay Ibrahim Sesay	Lieutenant General; Sullay Ibrahim Sesay	29 June 2020	Incumbent	6 years, 70 days	
