= Alfred Nelson-Williams =

Sierra Leonean Army officer

Major General Alfred Nelson-Williams GCOR
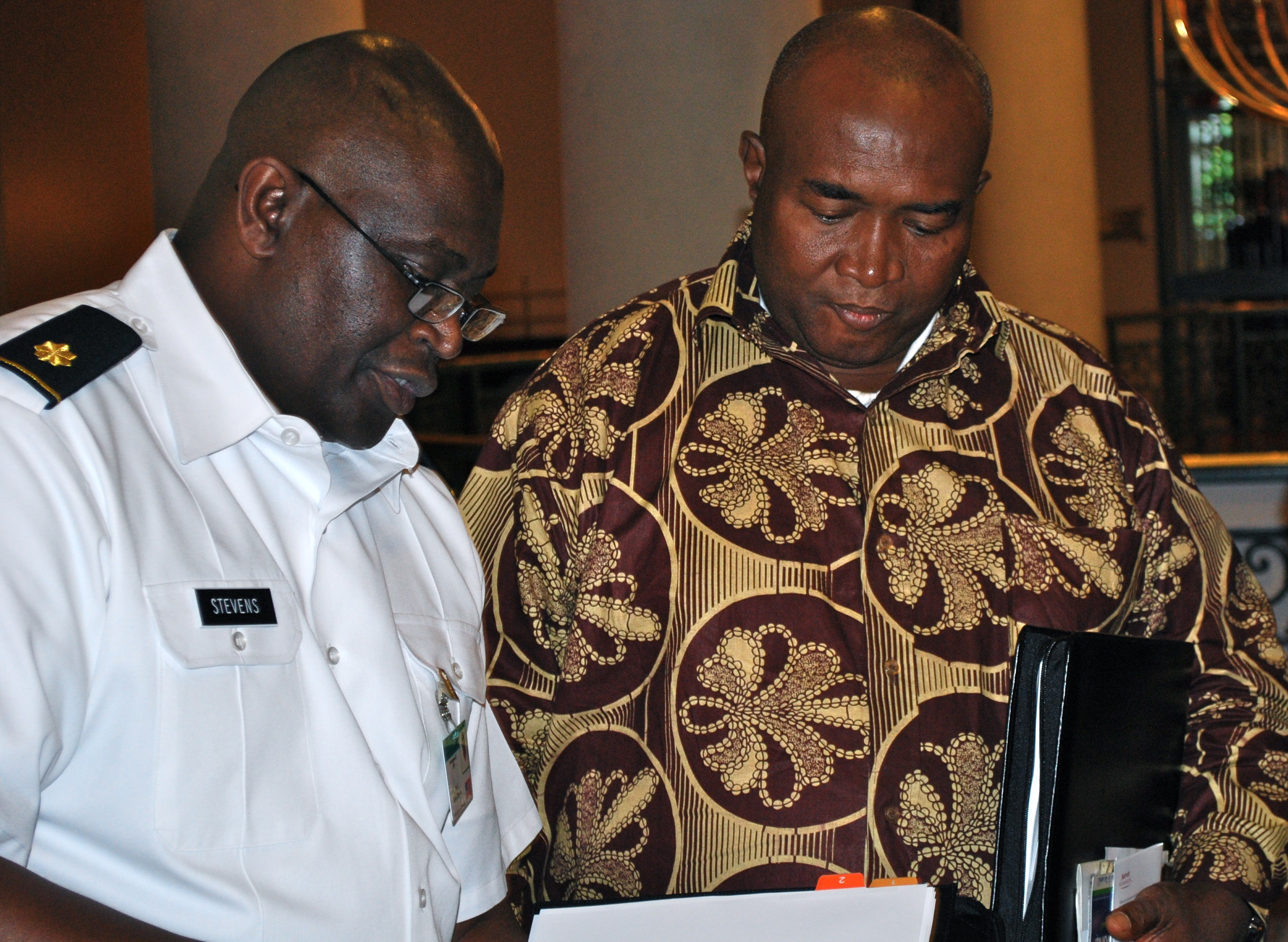
- Born: Alfred Claude Nelson-Williams
- Spouse: Gloria Nelson-Williams
- Children: 3
- Relatives: Justice Claudia Taylor (sister), Dr Claude Nelson-Williams (paternal cousin), Honourable John Nelson-Williams (paternal cousin),
- Military career
- Allegiance: Sierra Leone
- Branch: Army
- Rank: Major General
- Awards: GCOR; ECOMOG Medal

Major General Alfred Claude Nelson-Williams, GCOR is a retired Major General in the Republic of Sierra Leone Armed Forces (RSLAF). Nelson-Williams previously served as Chief of Defense Staff for Sierra Leone from 2008 to 2010.

Nelson-Williams holds degrees from Junior and Senior Command and Staff Colleges in Ghana, as a Fellow of the Nigeria War College, in Management and Public Administration at the University of Ghana at Legon, and as a Master of Science at the University of Ibadan in Nigeria.

His honors and awards include an ECOMOG Medal as well as long service, efficiency and gallantry medals. He also earned a national award as Grand Officer of the Order of Rokel.

== Military career ==
=== Early career ===
Nelson-Williams entered into the Republic of Sierra Leone Armed Forces in 1975 as an enlisted serviceman, then became commissioned as a regular combatant officer after completing an officer cadet training program in the Egyptian Military Academy in April 1978. Between 1978 and 1980 he continued to rise in the ranks, serving as a platoon commander and then as a mechanical and transport officer (MTO) in the second battalion, Republic of Sierra Leone Regiment (2RSLAR). In 1983, he was tasked to head the anti-smuggling squad while serving in the First Battalion, Republic of Sierra Leone Regiment (1RSLAR). After distinguishing himself in this service by arresting the organizers of an $11.5 million diamond racket in Kono despite being offered a bribe of $100,000 and a brand new Mercedes-Benz, Nelson-Williams moved up to the position of adjutant of the 1RSLAR in 1984, preparing him for further roles in military administration. In 1985 he completed a junior division command and staff course in Ghana Armed Forces Command and Staff College, and in 1986, he was appointed to head an anti-corruption squad. He returned to the adjutant post after this appointment, holding it from 1987 to 1990.

=== Service in the First Liberian Civil War ===
After serving this stint as adjutant, in 1991 Nelson-Williams was chosen to serve among the troops Sierra Leone contributed to the Economic Community of West African States Monitoring Group (ECOMOG) peace enforcement operations deployed by the Economic Community of West African States (ECOWAS) to the First Liberian Civil War. Nelson-Williams was initially appointed deputy chief military intelligence officer at ECOWAS headquarters, but was recalled to Sierra Leone. After this recall, he rejoined the ECOMOG force in several positions, distinguishing himself in particular at the Bo waterside by being the first officer to capture the Mano River Union Bridge, a major objective. After a brief return to Sierra Leone to serve as military assistant to the National Security Adviser in 1992, he returned to Liberia, where he was appointed contingent commander and commanding officer of the Sierra Leone contingent. For his distinguished and meritorious tour, he has been awarded a medal for his participation in ECOMOG (1992), a Gallantry Medal (1993) and a Long Service and Efficiency Medal (1994).

=== Return to Sierra Leone ===
In the later part of 1994, he served as administration and logistics staff officer grade one. In 1995 he worked as the principal staff officer to the CDS before enrolling in the Senior Division Staff and Command course at the Ghana Armed Forces Command and Staff College. He then earned a public administration diploma from the Ghana Institute of Management and Public Administration at Legon before returning to serve as the commanding officer for the 1RSLAR until 1997. In 1998, he was posted to the Armed Forces Training Center in Benguema and appointed commandant. In 2000, he served as Director of Land Operations (DLOP) in the Sierra Leone Civil War.

=== After the Sierra Leone Civil War ===
Nelson-Williams then proceeded to enroll at the Nigerian National War College. He was honoured as a Fellow of the War College upon graduation, and was later recognised as a Distinguished Star Alumnus in 2009. He was invited to the University of Ibadan in Nigeria to read for a Master of Science degree in strategic and defence studies which he completed with a thesis on "the role of the military in sustaining peace and democracy in post-war Sierra Leone."

Upon his return to Sierra Leone in 2002, he was appointed assistant Chief of Defense Staff (ACDS) Ops & Plans and promoted to the substantive rank of Brigadier General. In 2003, he was appointed deputy Chief of Defence Staff (DCDS) in addition to his appointment as ACDS Ops & Plans. In 2005, he relinquished his appointment of ACDS Ops & Plans and fully concentrated on his new responsibility as the Deputy Chief of Defence Staff and military spokesman. He was presented with the honour of "Grand Officer of the Order of Rokel" in 2007, and appointed to the position of Chief of the Defence Staff on Friday, 12 September 2008, by President Ernest Bai Koroma, succeeding Major General Edward Sam M'boma. In August 2010, he was placed on terminal leave by president Ernest Bai Koroma and succeeded as CDS by Robert Yira Koroma.

== International Diplomatic Work ==
Nelson-Williams was part of the delegation of the Commonwealth Heads of State meeting held in Nassau, Bahamas in 1985. He has attended the Africa Center for Strategic Studies (ACSS) organised by the United States Government in Senegal in 2003. He was actively engaged in the week of senior officers of African countries held in Beijing, China in 2007 at the National Defence University. He has taken part in two African Command (AFRICOM) dialogues in Washington DC sponsored by the United States Government and Department for Defence in 2007 and 2008 and the Forum for Africa held at the Institute of Higher Studies and National Defence in Paris, France in 2008. He served as a representative at the United Nations in New York and paved the way to send troops of the RSLAF on peace support operations. He is a co-author of the book "Security Sector Review in Sierra Leone −1996-2007" sponsored by the British Government, Foreign Ministry and the Department for International Development.

=== 2016 Kidnapping ===
On 1 July 2016, Nelson-Williams was scheduled to attend the military graduation ceremony of two Sierra Leonean army officers. His vehicle was stopped at an unofficial checkpoint on the Abuja Korona Highway in Kaduna, Nigeria. Nelson-Williams was kidnapped and ransomed for 44 million Naira (about $150,000).

He escaped without paying the ransom by either the Sierra Leone or Nigerian government on 5 July 2016.

== Family ==
Brigadier Nelson-Williams is married to Mrs. Gloria Nelson-Williams. They have three daughters.

He is a brother of Honourable Justice Claudia Taylor and a cousin of Honourable John Nelson-Williams, a former Member of Parliament in Sierra Leone and Cabinet Minister, and Dr Claude Nelson-Williams, a Sierra Leonean medical doctor and politician.

== Honours ==
- Sierra Leone: Grand Commander of the Order of the Rokel (2007)
