= Clifford Nelson Fyle =

Sierra Leonean academic, writer of the national anthem (1933–2006)

Personal details
- Born: Clifford Nelson Fyle; March 29, 1933 Freetown, British Sierra Leone
- Died: January 18, 2006 (aged 72) Yonkers, New York
- Party: United Progressive Party, Sierra Leone People's Party
- Education: Fourah Bay College: University of Durham; University of California; Indiana University
- Profession: Writer, Publisher, Author, Mathematician

Clifford Nelson Fyle (March 29, 1933 – January 18, 2006) was a Sierra Leonean academic and author, known for writing the lyrics to the Sierra Leone National Anthem.

== Early life ==
Clifford Nelson Fyle was born and raised in Freetown, British Sierra Leone to Creole parents. He attended Methodist Boys' High School in Freetown, and Fourah Bay College, which was then an accredited college of the University of Durham. Fyle obtained a Bachelor's degree in Languages and Mathematics aged 20, before spending the next few years teaching at his former High School.

He later continued his education in Durham proper, studying English at Hatfield College. He returned to Sierra Leone after his graduation in 1960.

== Career ==
Fyle was the first Publicity Secretary of the United Progressive Party (UPP) and the third in command of the same party, after Cyril Rogers-Wright and John Nelson-Williams, before it merged with the Sierra Leone People's Party (SLPP) forming the Government of National Unity that would lead Sierra Leone to national independence from the British Empire in 1961.

Fyle gave up politics to concentrate his efforts on education. He was appointed as an Education Officer and School Inspector by the Ministry of Education in 1960. He was the youngest School Inspector on record at that time. Four years later, in 1964, Fyle became a foundation staff member of the newly opened Njala University College. Still determined to pursue a career in the field of Linguistics, Fyle completed postgraduate work in 1967 at UCLA.

He subsequently became Senior Lecturer at Fourah Bay College, where he attained his Professorship. He was promoted to the positions of head of the Department of English and Dean of the Faculty of Arts from 1977–1978.

In addition, Professor Fyle was offered the position of Secretaryship of the West African Linguistic Society, an organization whose international Congress Fyle had organized at the Cape Sierra Hotel in Freetown in 1974. He rejected the offer, opting instead for the language specialist position for UNESCO in January 1978. In 1988 he became World Coordinator of Mother Tongue Languages and Vice President of Research.

With Professor Eldred Jones, Fyle co-authored the Krio-English Dictionary, which The Times newspaper (London) referred to in 1980 as "blazing a worldwide trail" in modern linguistic study and lexicography.

Rising from lecturer (1964) to professor and faculty dean (1977) Fyle revolutionized the teaching of languages within the University of Sierra Leone. He scientifically established Sierra Leone's' Lingua Franca, Krio, as a true Language. He also pioneered the establishment of the Department of Linguistics and Sierra Leone Languages. At UNESCO, he was responsible for the development of over 2000 Languages in 52 African countries and their use in communication and education. His remarkable success ensured his appointment (1988) as UNESCO's World Coordinator of Mother Tongue Languages, as well as Vice President of the International Association of research in Mother Tongue Education.

— Marquis Who's Who in the World

After retiring in 1993, Fyle returned to Sierra Leone and started producing school books in the four major languages of Sierra Leone which the Government had sanctioned for use in education: Mende, Temne, Limba and Krio. He produced and published 24 school textbooks. In 1995, Fyle established Lekon Publishing Company in Sierra Leone. Five years later, in 2000, Lekon New Dimension Publishing in Yonkers, New York. This company was the one that published Sorie Conteh's The Diamonds. His last novels, These Old Colonial Hills and The Alpha were also published by the same company. Blood Brothers, an earlier novel of his, was nominated for the 1998 International Dublin Literary Award.

== Death ==
Professor Clifford Nelson Fyle died on January 18, 2006, in Yonkers, New York.
