= Maxwell Khobe =

Nigerian general (1950–2000)

Brigadier General Maxwell Khobe

Chief of the Defence Staff of Sierra Leone
- In office April 1998 – April 2000
- President: Ahmad Tejan Kabbah
- Preceded by: Hassan Conteh
- Succeeded by: Tom Carew

Commander, ECOMOG Peacekeeping Force, Sierra Leone
- In office August 1997 – April 1998
- Preceded by: Brig-Gen. Abu Ahmadu
- Succeeded by: Maj-Gen. Felix Mujakperuo

Personal details
- Born: Maxwell Mitikishe Khobe; 1 January 1950 Zekun, Northern Region, British Nigeria (now in Adamawa State, Nigeria)
- Died: 18 April 2000 (aged 50)
- Education: Nigerian Defence Academy; Armed Forces Command and Staff College, Jaji
- Occupation: Military officer

Military service
- Allegiance: Nigeria
- Branch/service: Nigerian Army
- Years of service: 1969–2000
- Rank: Brigadier General
- Commands: ECOMOG; Republic of Sierra Leone Armed Forces

Maxwell Mitikishe Khobe (1 January 1950 – 18 April 2000) was a Nigerian army brigadier general who was the commander of the ECOMOG Peacekeeping Force in Sierra Leone from 1997 to 1998, and the Chief of the Defence Staff of Sierra Leone from 1998 to 2000.

== Background & education ==
Khobe was born in Zekun, Adamawa State and attended the Native Authority Junior Primary School, Dong from 1958 to 1961 and Native Authority Senior Primary School, Numan, from 1962 to 1963. He later attended the Church of the Brethren Mission, Waka Secondary School, Biu, in Borno State from 1964 to 1968. In September 1969, he enlisted as a soldier and subsequently enrolled in the Nigerian Defence Academy (NDA) Short Service Combatant Course 11 from 29 March 1971 until 13 September 1971 when he was commissioned an Infantry 2nd Lieutenant with seniority effective from 29 March 1971.

== Career ==
After playing a commendable role during the so called Dimka coup attempt of 1976, Khobe was encouraged to apply for transfer to the Armoured Corps as a Captain (which he became in 1977), having already attended the Young Officer’s Course (Infantry) and a number of support weapons courses at the School of Infantry. After joining the Armoured corps, he attended the Armoured Officers Basic Course at Fort Knox, Kentucky and later, the Advanced Armour Officer's Course. He also attended a Gunnery course at the Royal Armoured Corps School, Bovington Camp, UK.

Khobe was 2nd-In-Command of 245 Recce Battalion Ikeja under then Capt. Martin Luther Agwai (who would later become Chief of Army Staff) and was responsible for coordinating the training program of that battalion.

He attended the Armed Forces Command and Staff College, Jaji in 1983 and was promoted Major in 1984. In August 1985, he led a unit of Tanks in Lagos during the palace coup that removed Major General Muhammadu Buhari from power, ushering in fellow Armoured Corps officer, Major General Ibrahim Babangida. He was awarded the Forces Services Star in 1986 and became a Lieutenant-Colonel in 1989. He served four tours of duty in Liberia getting ECOMOG Liberia medals for each one. In addition he won the coveted Nigerian Army Chief of Army Staff Commendation Award and became a Colonel in 1994.

On 12 February 1998, he led the ECOMOG Ground Task Force assault that removed Major Johnny Paul Koroma from power and restored the elected government of President Ahmed Tejan Kabbah. He was promoted Brigadier General and later assumed the position of Chief of Defence Staff of Sierra Leone.

== Dates of promotion ==
Year	Insignia	Rank
1971		Second lieutenant (Commissioned)
1974		Lieutenant
1977		Captain
1984		Major
1989		Lieutenant colonel
1994		Colonel
1998		Brigadier general

== Death ==
Khobe died of encephalitis on 18 April 2000 at the St. Nicholas Hospital in Lagos one week after being evacuated back home from Sierra Leone. Following Khobe's death, the Rukuba Cantonment Jos was renamed Maxwell Khobe Cantonment.
