= High We Exalt Thee, Realm of the Free =

National anthem of Sierra Leone

- National anthem of Sierra Leone
- Lyrics: Clifford Nelson Fyle, 1961
- Music: John Akar (arranged by Logie E. K. Wright), 1961
- Adopted: 1961
- Preceded by: "God Save The Queen"

Audio sample
- U.S. Navy Band instrumental version (one verse): file; help

"High We Exalt Thee, Realm of the Free" is the national anthem of Sierra Leone. Written by Clifford Nelson Fyle and composed by John Akar in a nationwide competition, it was adopted in 1961 when the country became independent from the United Kingdom, replacing "God Save The Queen". The Constitution of Sierra Leone, 1991, makes it the responsibility of every citizen of Sierra Leone to "respect its ideals and its institutions", including the national anthem.

== Lyrics ==
The anthem consists of three verses, each ending with the phrase "Land that we love, our Sierra Leone."

English original

I
High we exalt thee, realm of the free;
Great is the love we have for thee;
Firmly united ever we stand,
Singing thy praise, O native land.
We raise up our hearts and our voices on high,
The hills and the valleys re-echo our cry;
Blessing and peace be ever thine own,
Land that we love, our Sierra Leone.

II
One with a faith that wisdom inspires,
One with a zeal that never tires;
Ever we seek to honour thy name,
Ours is the labour, thine the fame.
We pray that no harm on thy children may fall,
That blessing and peace may descend on us all;
So may we serve thee ever alone,
Land that we love, our Sierra Leone.

III
Knowledge and truth our forefathers spread,
Mighty the nations whom they led;
Mighty they made thee, so too may we
Show forth the good that is ever in thee.
We pledge our devotion, our strength and our might,
Thy cause to defend and to stand for thy right;
All that we have be ever thine own,
Land that we love, our Sierra Leone.

Krio translation

I
Wi de es yu ɔp, wi de rul di wan dɛn we fri;
Di lɔv we wi gɛt fɔ yu rili big;
Wi de tinap tranga wan ɔltɛm,
Siŋ yu prez yu, O nativ land.
Wi de es wi at ɛn wi vɔys ɔp ɔp,
Di il ɛn di vali dɛn de mek wi kray bak;
Yu yon blɛsin ɛn pis de sote go,
Land we wi lɛk, wi Siera Liɔn.

II
Wan we gɛt fet we gɛt sɛns,
Wan we gɛt zil we nɔ de taya;
Wi de tray fɔ ɔnɔ yu nem ɔltɛm,
Wi yon na di wok, na yu yon di fame.
Wi de pre mek no bad tin we go apin to yu pikin dɛn,
Dat blɛsin ɛn pis go kam dɔŋ pan wi ɔl;
So mek wi de sav yu wan de sote go,
Land we wi lɛk, wi Siera Liɔn.

III
Wi fɔstɛm pipul dɛn bin de skata di no ɛn di trut,
Matiful di neshɔn dɛn we dɛn bin de lid;
Dɛn mek yu pawaful, ɛn wisɛf go mek yu gɛt pawa
Sho di gud tin dɛn we de insay yu ɔltɛm.
Wi de prɔmis wi devoshɔn, wi trɛnk ɛn wi trɛnk,
Yu kes fɔ difend ɛn tinap fɔ yu rayt;
Ɔl wetin wi gɛt na yu yon ɔltɛm,
Land we wi lɛk, wi Siera Liɔn.
