= Noah Arthur William Cox-George =

Sierra Leonean economist

- Born: June 15, 1915; Degema, British Nigeria
- Died: November 12, 2004 (aged 89)

Academic background
- Education: London School of Economics University of Oxford

Academic work
- Discipline: Economics
- Institutions: Fourah Bay College

Dr. Noah Arthur William Cox-George, also known as N. A. Cox-George (June 15, 1915 – November 12, 2004), was a Sierra Leone Creole economist and academic whose work, Finance and Development in West Africa: The Sierra Leone Experience, was one of the early works that examined and detailed the economic history of a former British West African Colony.

== Early life ==
Cox-George was born on June 15, 1915, in Degema, British Nigeria, to Sierra Leonean parents, Noah Obediah Collingwood George and Rosabel Abigail Regina George (née Cox). Noah Obediah George was a Creole civil servant of Nova Scotian Settler descent and Rosabel Cox-George was a Creole of Barbadian descent. The George family had been among the 1,131 black American colonists who had founded the second colony of Sierra Leone and the settlement of Freetown in March 1792. Cox-George grew up in Freetown and attended the Government Model, before proceeding to the CMS Grammar School in 1930.

== Education ==
Following his graduation from the Grammar School, Cox-George was employed as a clerk in the Post and Telecommunications Department in Freetown and subsequently was employed at Paterson Zochonis in Conakry, Guinea. He proceeded to the London School of Economics (LSE) where he obtained a second-class honours degree in 1946. Cox-George then completed his M.S.c at LSE, before proceeding to Oxford University in 1954 to pursue a doctorate degree.

== Career as an academic ==
Following the completion of his graduate studies, Cox-George proceeded to Fourah Bay College, where he helped to set up the economics department and was a senior lecturer and dean. Between 1961 and 1964, Cox-George proceeded to the University of Nigeria, Nsukka, where he was instrumental in setting up the Department of Economics and served as the Head of the Department of Economics. He established himself as an eminent academic within Sierra Leone and the US and proposed a political development plan that would include a bicameral legislative chamber that would represent both the Colony of Sierra Leone and the Protectorate during the pre-independence era.

== Personal life ==
Cox-George married Rachel Ademike Biola Wright (August 5, 1933 – October 27, 2005) and the couple had children: Luba Bonita Alcestis, Siegfried Amadeus Maynard, Beryl Effuah Zorah and Christabel Isadora Richenda.

== Death and legacy ==
Cox-George died on November 12, 2004, aged 89, and was survived by his wife, Rachel and children. Rachel Cox-George died a year later in 2005, aged 72.

== Sources ==
- Contemporary Authors Biography: Noah Arthur William Cox-George
- Walker, James, The Black Loyalists: The Search for a Promised Land in Nova Scotia and Sierra Leone, 1783–1870, (Toronto: University of Toronto Press, 1992).
