= John Akar =

Sierra Leonean entertainer, writer and diplomat (1927–1975)

- Born: May 20, 1927; Rotifunk, Sierra Leone Colony
- Died: June 23, 1975 (aged 48)
- Occupations: Journalist; Diplomat; Composer; Writer

John Joseph Akar (1927–1975) was a Sierra Leonean entertainer, writer, and diplomat. He served as Sierra Leonean ambassador to the United States. Today, he is probably best known for composing the music of Sierra Leone's National Anthem.

== Early life ==
Akar was born in the small town of Rotifunk, Moyamba District in the Southern Province of British Sierra Leone, to an ethnic Sherbro mother and to a Sierra Leonean-Lebanese father. Akar attended the E.U.B. primary school in Rotifunk, and proceeded to Albert Academy secondary school in Freetown. After he completed his secondary education, he moved to the United States.

== Career ==
In 1960, Akar became the first non-Creole and the first Sherbro to be appointed Director of Broadcasting of the Sierra Leone Broadcasting Services (SLBS).

In 1963, Akar founded the National Dance Troupe to encourage Sierra Leoneans to have pride in their cultural heritage. In 1964, he and the National Dance Troupe were invited to the United States to perform at New York World's Fair. They were presented with a plaque won for giving the best performance of the fair. In late 1964, they performed at the art festival in London. In 1965 they performed at the Negro Arts Festival in Dakar, Senegal. In 1966, they went on a four-month tour of Europe, including performances in Germany, Sweden and France.

Known for his humor Akar was a repeat guest on the Merv Griffin Show on television.
