= James Blyden Jenkins-Johnston =

Sierra Leonean Legal Luminary (1946–2016)

James Blyden Jenkins-Johnston Esq. G.C.O.R.
- Jenkins-Johnston in 1974
- Born: James Blyden Ayodele Jenkins-Johnston; October 2, 1946; Freetown, Sierra Leone
- Died: September 9, 2016 (aged 69); Kent, England
- Education: University of Durham (B.A. Hons. English); Honourable Society of Lincoln's Inn/Council of Legal Education School of Law, London (Called to the Bar)
- Occupations: Barrister-At-Law, Solicitor, Commissioner for Oaths & Notary Public
- Spouse: Christiana Jenkins-Johnston (m. 1971–2016)
- Children: 5
- Awards: Grand Commander of the Order of the Rokel (G.C.O.R.), 2012

James Blyden Jenkins-Johnston, G.C.O.R. (October 2, 1946 – September 9, 2016) was a lawyer in Sierra Leone known for his pursuit of the advancement of ordinary Sierra Leoneans through governance-challenging social commentary; defending human rights, constitutionalism and the rule of law; and personal philanthropy. He was a steadfast champion of workers' rights, and legal adviser to the Sierra Leone Labour Congress for over 30 years.

== Early life and education ==
James Blyden Ayodele Jenkins-Johnston (also known as J.B. Jenkins-Johnston or Jenkins or JayBee) was born on October 2, 1946, in Freetown, Sierra Leone, to James Blyden Jenkins-Johnston Sr., J.P., O.B.E. and Marion Esther Jenkins-Johnston, née Jones. He graduated Bachelor of Arts with Honours in English Language and Literature from Fourah Bay College (then University of Durham in 1969) where he was a member and Senior Brother of Excelsior Fraternity and a member of the Student Union Government. He went on to study Law in the United Kingdom in 1970 and was called to the English Bar at the Honourable Society of Lincoln's Inn/Council of Legal Education School of Law, London in July 1974.

== Legal practice ==
Jenkins-Johnston returned to Sierra Leone and set up a lucrative private general legal practice covering the whole of the country after being enrolled and admitted to practice as Barrister and Solicitor in Sierra Leone in December 1974. The practice, named Ayotunde Chambers (a combination of his and his wife's names), covered a wide area of practice.

== Social commentary ==
Jenkins-Johnston was known for his "famous (open) letters" holding the government's feet to the fire and expressing the frustrations of many in Sierra Leone. He touched on everything from the state of public services to workers' rights to matters of the constitution.

On public services

In one such letter, Jenkins-Johnston demanded answers from the President about unfulfilled election promises regarding the state of electricity supply in the country.

On workers' rights

When commercial bike riders were banned by the government from operating in the business district of Freetown, Jenkins-Johnston came to their defence and wrote a passionate open letter in which he called for the immediate review or cancellation of that decision, describing the ban as a "violent punishment on both the riders and citizens, and considered the government's move as not only unfair but illegal and unjust," noting that the ban was causing too much trouble to a substantial number of citizens.

On democracy, development, and the constitution

When it became clear that there would have to be a second round of elections at the 2007 General Elections, and the spectre of violence reared its head, Jenkins-Johnston wrote a wide-ranging impassioned letter to the elected leaders of the respective political parties in which he implored them that "the old politics of violence, threats, coercion and intolerance is long dead, and as we all proved on August 11, 2007, Elections can and ought to be conducted in peace and tranquility, and with decency and maturity. As I understand it, "DEMOCRACY" is all about letting the people (the ordinary folk, or the common man if you like) have their say as to who is to lead or rule them, freely and without any threats, intimidation, coercion or violence whatsoever, that is the only power (a very potent power) that the ordinary citizens have, and it should not be taken away from them by anyone for any reason whatsoever." He also pointed out "that the Constitution clearly provided at Section 42 that if there was no candidate who polled 55% of the valid votes cast at the presidential election, then there must be a second round of voting between the two (2) who polled the highest votes in the first round within a period of 14 days."

== Eminent career as legal luminary ==
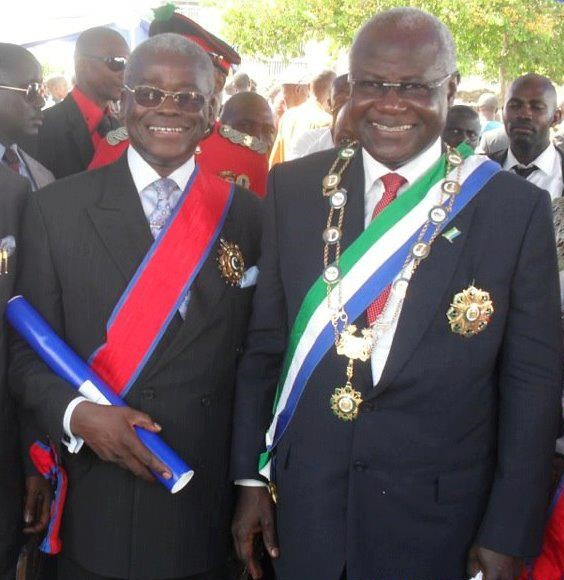
Jenkins-Johnston receiving his GCOR from Preseident Ernest Koroma on Independence Day 2012.

On Independence Day, April 27, 2012, Jenkins-Johnston was awarded Grand Commander of the Order of the Rokel (GCOR) by President Ernest Koroma, in recognition of 38 years of Distinguished Public Service as a General Legal Practitioner, Human Rights Lawyer and Social Commentator.

=== Achievements ===
In June 2012, Jenkins-Johnston was elected President of the Sierra Leone Bar Association for the fourth time, having previously been elected as the Bar's president for three consecutive terms from 1988-1991.

He was a member of the Commonwealth Lawyers Association, International Associate of the American Bar Association, Member of the International Bar Association to which he was elected as an Executive Member in 2000. He was also a Member of the Council of Legal Education (1989-1992) and Member of the Judicial and Legal Service Commission (1989-1999).

A founding Bencher and Tutor, Jenkins-Johnston taught Professional Practice and Ethics at Sierra Leone Law School from 1990 to 1992.

He was a City Solicitor (Legal Adviser to Freetown City Council) and Member of the Freetown City Council Committee of Management between 1983 and 1989; Member of the Disciplinary Committee of the General Legal Council; Member, Newspaper Advisory Committee (1983-1986).

=== Appointments ===
Commissioner for Oaths (1985)

Notary Public (1992)

Chairman, Board of Directors Sierra Leone External Communications Co. Ltd (SLET) from 1992 to 1995

Commissioner of the Law Reform Commission (2003)

Chairman of the Teaching Service Trade Group Negotiating Council (2003)

Chairman, Board of Governors, Murraydeen Preparatory School (1989-1998)

He was a member of the National Constitutional Review Commission appointed by the late President J.S. Momoh in 1990, which drew up the present National Constitution in 1991.

Jenkins-Johnston was appointed Chairman of the Commission of Inquiry to inquire into the disturbances at Koidu Holdings in Kono by President Koroma in January 2008 and produced a report in just 3 months in March 2008.

During the 1997–1998 AFRC/RUF interregnum when virtually all magistrates and many judges and lawyers had left the country, Jenkins-Johnston served as the acting president of the Sierra Leone Bar association.

== Honors ==
- Sierra Leone: Grand Commander of the Order of the Rokel (2012)
