= Edward Sam M'boma =

Sierra Leonean military commander

Edward Sam M'bomah is a Sierra Leonean military commander. He is at the rank of Major General and is also the Chief of the Defence Staff of The Republic of Sierra Leone Armed Forces. In February 2007, M'boma acted as spokesman for the RSLAF in declaring that no voting booths for the upcoming federal elections will be placed inside the army barracks. Instead, the booths will be placed among other civilians, thus eliminating the chance that military personnel votes can be separated from that of civilians.

== Sources ==
- Saidu Kamara (20 Feb 2007). "Ahead of 2007 Elections…Chief of Defense Staff Rejects Polling Boxes". Standard Times Press. Archived from the original on 23 July 2011.
