= Tom Carew =

Tom Carew was a Brigadier, possibly later promoted to Major General, in the Sierra Leonean army and Chief of Defence Staff of the Government of Sierra Leone from April 2000 to November 2003, at which point Sierra Leone President Ahmad Tejan Kabbah reassigned him to non-military duties.
