= Legislative Council of Sierra Leone =

The Legislative Council of Sierra Leone was the official executive body that governed the Crown Colony of Sierra Leone. The Members of the Colonial Council were accorded the title of 'Honorable' and were responsible for decision-making in the Colony of Sierra Leone.

== Sierra Leone Company Council ==
The Sierra Leone Company was the official company that founded the Colony of Sierra Leone and established the governing council body that governed the private colony of Sierra Leone.

== Colonial Council of Sierra Leone ==
The Colonial Council or Governor's Council of Sierra Leone was organised in a similar structure to colonial councils in India and elsewhere.

The Council was headed by the Governor of Sierra Leone and the senior colonial council was composed of the Chief Justice and Colonial Secretary of Sierra Leone.

== Legislative Council of Sierra Leone ==
In 1863, the Colonial Council of Sierra Leone was reorganised as the Legislative Council in accordance with other British Crown Colonies in the Empire. Sierra Leonean merchants and professionals were appointed as 'Unofficial Members' of the Legislative Council and could advise, but not veto, the bills of law that were passed by the Executive Council.

== Sources ==
- Wyse, Akintola, H.C. Bankole-Bright and Politics in Colonial Sierra Leone, 1919-1958, (Cambridge: Cambridge University Press, 2003)
