= Cabinet of Sierra Leone =

Chief executive body of the Republic of Sierra Leone

The Cabinet of Sierra Leone is the chief executive body of the Republic of Sierra Leone. Cabinet members are nominated by the President and are then proceeded to the House of Parliament of Sierra Leone for confirmation or rejection by a majority vote by members of Parliament. The president has the constitutional power to dismiss a cabinet official at any time.

== The current cabinet of Sierra Leone (2023–present) ==
Office	Minister
Dr. Julius Maada Bio	President, and Commander in Chief
Dr. Mohamed Juldeh Jalloh	Vice President
Dr. David Moinina Sengeh	Chief Minister
Timothy Musa Kabba	Minister of Foreign Affairs and International Co-operation
Sheku Ahmed Fantamadi Bangura	Minister of Finance
Mohamed Lamin Tarawally	Attorney- General and Minister of Justice
Conrad Sackey	Minister of Basic and Senior Secondary Education
Dr. Austin Demby	Minister of Health
Major-General (Rtd.) David T.O. Taluva	Minister of Internal Affairs
Brig. (Rtd.) Kellie Conteh	Minister of Defence
Alhaji Fanday Turay	Minister of Transport and Aviation
Dr. Turad Senesie	Minister of Lands, Housing and Country Planning
August James Teima	Minister of Youth Affairs
Henry M. Kpaka	Minister of Agriculture and Food Security
Amara Kallon	Minister of Public Administration and Political Affairs
Jiwoh Abdulai	Minister of the Environment and Climate Change
Mohamed R. Swaray	Minister of Employment, Labour and Social Security
Haja Salimatu Bah	Communication, Technology and Innovation
Ibrahim Alpha Sesay	Minister of Trade and Industry
Alhaji Kanja Sesay	Minister of Energy
Chernor Bah	Minister of Information and Civic Education
Princess Dugba	Minister of Fisheries and Marine Resources
Alpha Osman Timbo	Minister of Labour and Social Security
Dr. Sao-Kpato Hannah Max-Kyne	Minister of Water Resources and Sanitation
Melrose Karminty	Minister of Social Welfare
Dr. Isata Mahoi	Minister of Gender and Children's Affairs
Kenyeh Ballay	Minister of Planning and Economic Development
Dr. Ramatulai Worie (Haja)	Minister of Technical and Higher Education
Dr. Denis Sandy	Minister of Works and Public Assets
Julius Mattai	Minister of Mines and Mineral Resources
Tamba Lamina	Minister of Local Government and Community Affairs
Nabela F. Tunis	Minister of Tourism and Culture
Adekunle King	Minister, Western Region
Mohamed E. K. Alie	Resident Minister, South
Gbessay Jusu Ngobeh	Resident Minister, East
Abu Abu Abdulai Koroma	Resident Minister, North
Umaru B. Wurie	Resident Minister, North West

=== Presidential staff ===
Office	Minister
State House Chief of Staff	
State House Presidential Spokesman	
State House Communications Director	
Aide-de-camp	

== Sierra Leone embassies abroad ==
The ambassadors of Sierra Leone are the highest ranking diplomats that represent Sierra Leone, its citizens and interests in foreign countries or organizations like the United Nations, African Union and Ecowas. The ambassadors are part of the executive branch of the Government of Sierra Leone and they work directly under the supervision of the Sierra Leone Ministry of Foreign Affairs. The ambassadors are appointed by the President and are then proceeded to the House of Parliament for confirmation or rejection by a majority vote by members of Parliament.

== Current ambassadors of Sierra Leone ==
Office	Minister
Sierra Leone Ambassador to the United Nations	Adikalie Foday Sumah
Sierra Leone Ambassador to Ethiopia and Permanent Representative to the African Union	Osman Keh Kamara
Sierra Leone Ambassador to the United States	Bockari Kortu Stevens
Sierra Leone Ambassador to the United Kingdom	Edward Mohamed Turay
Sierra Leone Ambassador to Nigeria	Haja Afsatu Kabba
Sierra Leone Ambassador to Belgium	Alhaji MOK
Sierra Leone Ambassador to Saudi Arabia	Mohamed Sillah Kargbo
Sierra Leone Ambassador to Germany	Jongopie Stevens
Sierra Leone Ambassador to Guinea	Mabinty Daramy
Sierra Leone Ambassador to Liberia	Brima Acha Kamara
Sierra Leone Ambassador to China	Almamy P. Koroma
Sierra Leone Ambassador to Senegal	Ebun Strasser-King
Sierra Leone Ambassador to Ghana	Haja Umu Hawa Tejan Jalloh
Sierra Leone Ambassador to The Gambia	Alhaji Soulayman B. Daramy
Sierra Leone Ambassador to United Arab Emirates	Alhaji Siray Alpha Timbo
Sierra Leone Ambassador to Russia	John Yambasu
Sierra Leone Ambassador to Kuwait	Ibrahim Bakarr Kamara
Sierra Leone Ambassador to Iran	Alimamy A. Kamara
