= Freetown City Council =

Official municipal authority of Freetown, Sierra Leone

Type
- Type: City council

Leadership
- The Mayor/Head of Freetown City Council: Yvonne Aki-Sawyerr (APC)
- The Deputy Mayor/Head of Freetown City Council: Kweku Lisk
- Chief Administrator of the Freetown City Council: Raman Tom
- Finance Officer of the Freetown City Council: Ishmaila Bah

Structure
- Length of term: 4 years
- Authority: Local Government Act, 2004

Meeting place
- Freetown City Hall; 17 Wallace Johnson Street; Freetown, Sierra Leone

Website
- fcc.gov.sl

Freetown City Council is the municipal government of the city of Freetown, the capital of Sierra Leone. It was established in 1893 and is one of the oldest municipal governments in Africa. The Freetown City Hall, located on Wallace-Johnson Street, is the meeting place and seat of government of the Freetown City Council.

The city of Freetown is politically divided into three regions: East End Freetown, Central Freetown and the West End of Freetown, which are subdivided into wards. Members of the Freetown city council, including the mayor, are directly elected every four years by the residents of Freetown and they represent different wards throughout the city.

Members of the Freetown City Council are known as councillors, except the deputy mayor and the mayor, in whom local executive power is vested within the city of Freetown. The City Council, including the mayor, are responsible for the general management of the city of Freetown. The mayor carry out laws pass by the city council. The Freetown City Council is noted for having its own municipal police forces. The current mayor of Freetown is Her Worship Yvonne Aki-Sawyerr OBE of the All People's Congress (APC).

All appointed members by the mayor must be approved by the Freetown City Council before taking office. Since its founding to present, virtually all mayors of Freetown are members of the Creole ethnic group except when Abdul Rahman, an ethnic Oku and Siaka Stevens of Limba descent were elected in 1961 and 1964 respectively. Freetown City Council politics has been dominated by the All People's Congress party (APC).

The Freetown City Council is one of the most powerful municipal government in Africa. its powers include, but not limited to:

- Collect local taxes
- Responsible for city cleaning and trash collection
- Has its own municipal police force
- Control streets and petty trading
- Issue of business license to shop owners and petty traders
- Monitor Motorcycle and bike riders
- Remove abandon vehicles off the streets
- In charge of cemeteries in Freetown
- Supervises and inspect restaurants and local shops
