= Demographics of Sierra Leone =

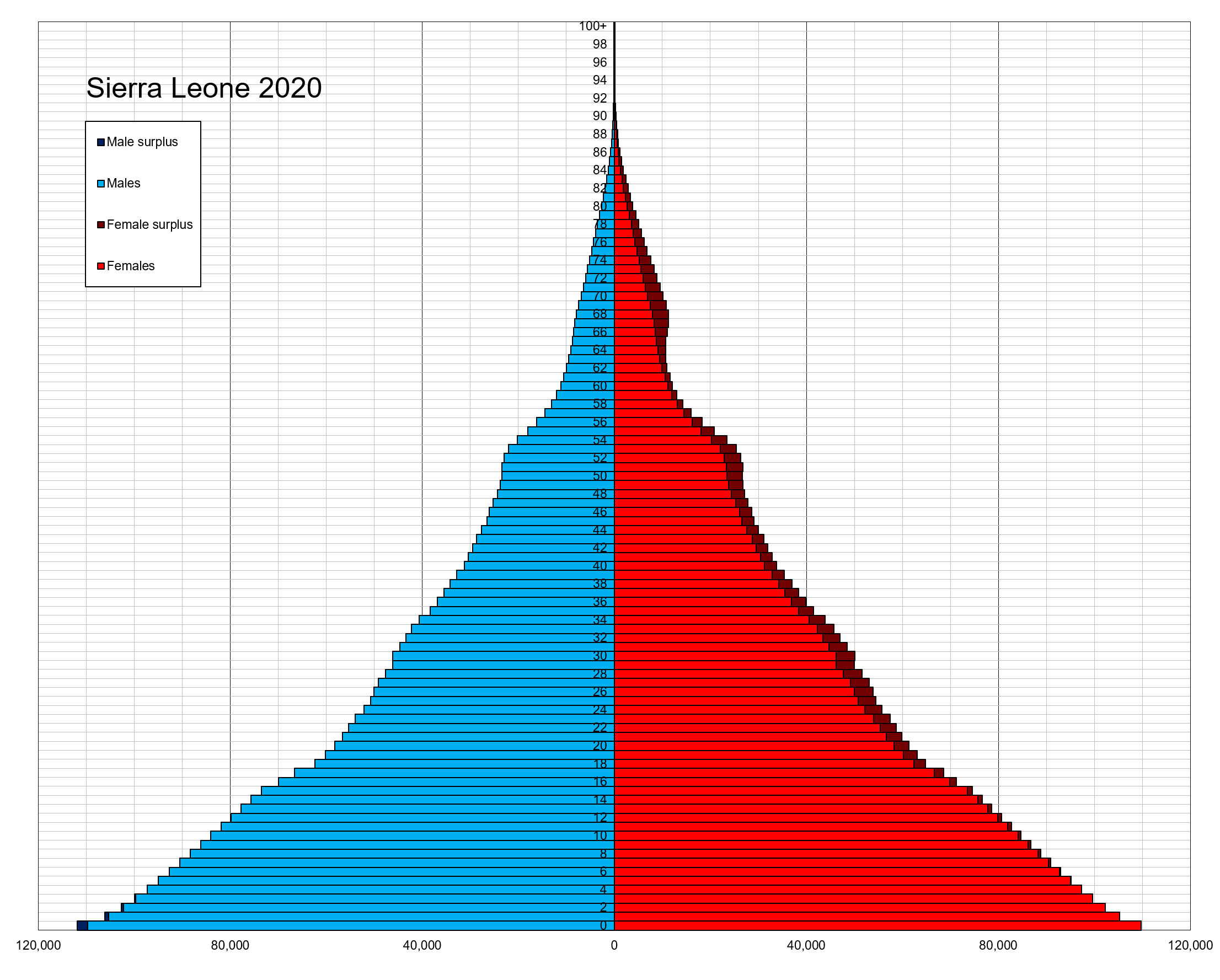
- Sierra Leone population pyramid in 2020
- Population: 8,420,641
- Density: 80.06 inhabitants per sq km.
- Growth rate: 15.40% (2004–2014 est.)
- Birth rate: 29.5 births/1,000 inhabitants (2025 est.)
- Death rate: 8.1 deaths/1,000 inhabitants (2025 est.)
- Life expectancy: 57.39 years
  - male: 54.85 years
  - female: 60.00 years
- Fertility rate: 3.61 children born/woman (2025 est.)
- Infant mortality: 73.29 deaths/1,000 births

Age structure
- 0–14 years: 41.9%
- 15–64 years: 54.4%
- 65 and over: 3.7%

Sex ratio
- Total: 0.94 male(s)/female
- At birth: 1.03 male(s)/female
- Under 15: 0.99 male(s)/female
- 15–64 years: 0.94 male(s)/female
- 65 and over: 0.78 male(s)/female

Nationality
- Nationality: Sierra Leonean(s)
- Major ethnic: Temne 25.2%, Mende 30.5%
- Minor ethnic: Fula 5.4%, Limba 6.4%, Kono 10.4%, Loko 2.9%, Koranko 2.8%, Sherbro 2.6%, Mandingo 2.4%, Creole 5.2%, Other 5.2%

Language
- Official: English
- Spoken: Krio, Temne, Mende

The demographics of Sierra Leone are made up of an indigenous population from 18 ethnic groups. The Temne in the north and the Mende in the south are the largest. About 60,000 are Krio, the descendants of freed slaves who returned to Sierra Leone from Great Britain, North America and slave ships captured on the high seas.

In the past, some Sierra Leoneans were noted for their educational achievements, trading activity, entrepreneurial skills, and arts and crafts work, particularly woodcarving. Many are part of larger ethnic networks extending into several countries, which link West African states in the area. Their level of education and infrastructure have declined sharply over the last 30 years.

== Population ==
Historical populations of Sierra Leone
Year	Pop.	±% p.a.
1963	2,180,355	—
1974	2,735,159	+2.08%
1985	3,515,812	+2.31%
2004	4,976,871	+1.85%
2014	5,743,725	+1.44%

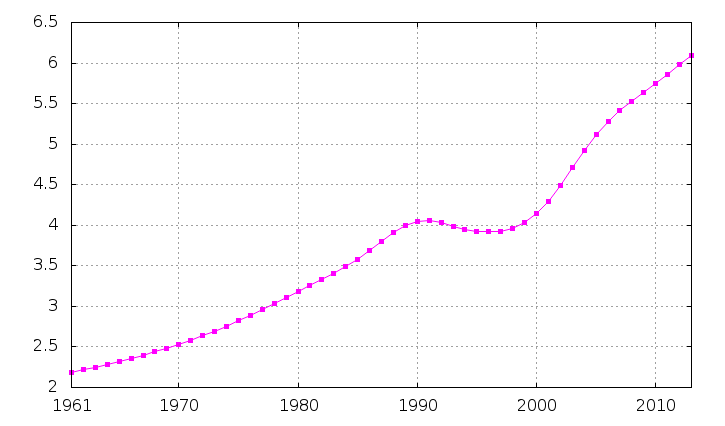
Sierra Leone's total population, from 1961 to 2013.

According to the 2022 revision of the World Population Prospects the total population was 8,420,641 in 2021, compared to only 1 895 000 in 1950. The proportion of children below the age of 15 in 2010 was 43%, 55.1% was between 15 and 65 years of age, while 1.9% was 65 years or older .

	Total population	Population aged 0–14 (%)	Population aged 15–64 (%)	Population aged 65+ (%)
1950	1 895 000	39.4	57.6	3.0
1955	2 029 000	39.6	57.5	2.9
1960	2 187 000	39.6	57.5	2.9
1965	2 373 000	39.8	57.3	2.9
1970	2 593 000	40.5	56.9	2.9
1975	2 845 000	40.5	56.6	3.0
1980	3 162 000	41.1	56.0	2.9
1985	3 541 000	42.0	55.3	2.7
1990	3 982 000	42.4	55.1	2.6
1995	3 898 000	42.3	55.3	2.4
2000	4 143 000	42.4	55.5	2.1
2005	5 153 000	42.9	55.2	1.9
2010	5 868 000	43.0	55.1	1.9

Population Estimates by Sex and Age Group (01.VII.2020) (Estimates or projections based on the 2015 population census.):

Age group	Male	Female	Total	%
Total	3 987 250	4 113 068	8 100 318	100
0–4	620 177	639 745	1 259 922	15.55
5–9	546 368	563 608	1 109 976	13.70
10–14	492 216	507 749	999 965	12.34
15–19	415 263	428 368	843 631	10.30
20–24	373 462	385 247	758 709	9.37
25–29	324 639	334 883	659 522	8.14
30–34	272 318	280 911	553 229	6.83
35–39	226 560	233 708	460 268	5.68
40–44	181 985	187 730	369 715	4.56
45–49	144 473	149 031	293 504	3.62
50–54	110 450	113 934	224 384	2.77
55–59	84 146	86 801	170 947	2.11
60–64	64 608	66 647	131 255	1.62
65-69	47 370	48 865	96 235	1.19
70-74	33 569	34 630	68 199	0.84
75-79	22 307	23 010	45 317	0.56
80+	27 339	28 201	55 540	0.69
Age group	Male	Female	Total	Percent
0–14	1 658 761	1 711 102	3 369 863	41.60
15–64	2 197 904	2 267 260	4 465 164	55.12
65+	130 585	134 706	265 291	3.28

== Vital statistics ==
Registration of vital events is in Sierra Leone not complete. The website Our World in Data prepared the following estimates based on statistics from the Population Department of the United Nations.

	Mid-year population	Live births	Deaths	Natural change	Crude birth rate (per 1000)	Crude death rate (per 1000)	Natural change (per 1000)	Total fertility rate (TFR)	Infant mortality (per 1000 live births)	Life expectancy (in years)
1950	2,001,000	97,000	68,000	29,000	48.6	34.1	14.5	6.09	251.2	29.6
1951	2,027,000	98,000	69,000	30,000	48.5	33.8	14.7	6.07	249.5	29.8
1952	2,053,000	99,000	68,000	31,000	48.2	33.3	15.0	6.03	246.1	30.3
1953	2,079,000	100,000	68,000	32,000	48.0	32.7	15.2	6.00	242.9	30.9
1954	2,107,000	102,000	68,000	33,000	48.3	32.4	15.9	6.05	239.9	31.3
1955	2,136,000	104,000	69,000	35,000	48.4	32.1	16.4	6.07	237.0	31.8
1956	2,166,000	105,000	69,000	36,000	48.6	31.8	16.8	6.10	234.3	32.2
1957	2,198,000	107,000	69,000	38,000	48.6	31.6	17.1	6.12	231.4	32.6
1958	2,230,000	109,000	70,000	39,000	48.7	31.3	17.4	6.13	228.5	33.0
1959	2,264,000	110,000	70,000	40,000	48.7	30.9	17.8	6.15	225.6	33.5
1960	2,301,000	113,000	71,000	42,000	48.9	30.6	18.3	6.18	222.7	34.0
1961	2,341,000	115,000	71,000	44,000	49.0	30.3	18.7	6.21	219.8	34.4
1962	2,383,000	117,000	71,000	45,000	49.0	30.0	19.1	6.22	217.0	34.9
1963	2,427,000	119,000	72,000	47,000	49.1	29.6	19.5	6.26	214.1	35.3
1964	2,473,000	121,000	72,000	49,000	49.1	29.2	19.9	6.29	211.1	35.9
1965	2,521,000	123,000	72,000	51,000	48.8	28.7	20.1	6.31	208.2	36.4
1966	2,570,000	125,000	73,000	52,000	48.7	28.3	20.4	6.35	205.2	36.9
1967	2,620,000	127,000	73,000	55,000	48.6	27.8	20.8	6.38	202.3	37.4
1968	2,672,000	129,000	73,000	56,000	48.3	27.4	20.9	6.39	199.5	37.8
1969	2,725,000	131,000	74,000	57,000	48.0	27.0	21.0	6.39	196.7	38.2
1970	2,779,000	133,000	74,000	59,000	47.8	26.5	21.3	6.41	194.0	38.8
1971	2,832,000	135,000	74,000	61,000	47.7	26.0	21.7	6.43	191.4	39.3
1972	2,887,000	137,000	74,000	63,000	47.5	25.6	22.0	6.45	188.8	39.8
1973	2,942,000	140,000	74,000	65,000	47.4	25.2	22.2	6.47	186.4	40.2
1974	2,999,000	143,000	74,000	68,000	47.5	24.8	22.7	6.53	184.0	40.7
1975	3,056,000	145,000	75,000	70,000	47.3	24.4	23.0	6.55	181.5	41.2
1976	3,113,000	147,000	75,000	72,000	47.1	24.0	23.2	6.55	179.2	41.6
1977	3,172,000	149,000	75,000	74,000	47.0	23.6	23.4	6.57	177.0	42.1
1978	3,235,000	152,000	75,000	77,000	47.0	23.2	23.7	6.59	174.9	42.5
1979	3,300,000	155,000	76,000	79,000	46.7	22.9	23.9	6.58	172.9	42.9
1980	3,367,000	157,000	76,000	81,000	46.5	22.6	23.9	6.56	171.1	43.1
1981	3,437,000	160,000	77,000	83,000	46.4	22.4	24.1	6.55	169.3	43.4
1982	3,509,000	163,000	78,000	85,000	46.5	22.2	24.3	6.56	167.5	43.6
1983	3,586,000	167,000	79,000	88,000	46.5	22.0	24.5	6.57	165.9	43.8
1984	3,666,000	171,000	80,000	91,000	46.5	21.9	24.7	6.59	164.4	43.9
1985	3,749,000	174,000	82,000	92,000	46.4	21.8	24.6	6.59	163.1	43.9
1986	3,843,000	178,000	84,000	94,000	46.4	21.8	24.6	6.60	161.9	43.8
1987	3,948,000	183,000	85,000	98,000	46.4	21.6	24.8	6.61	160.3	44.0
1988	4,056,000	187,000	87,000	100,000	46.2	21.5	24.6	6.59	159.0	44.0
1989	4,159,000	191,000	89,000	102,000	45.9	21.4	24.4	6.57	157.9	44.0
1990	4,325,000	195,000	91,000	104,000	45.8	21.3	24.5	6.57	156.9	44.1
1991	4,378,000	206,000	97,000	109,000	45.8	21.7	24.2	6.55	156.4	43.5
1992	4,302,000	201,000	94,000	107,000	45.9	21.5	24.4	6.56	154.8	43.6
1993	4,296,000	200,000	93,000	107,000	46.0	21.5	24.5	6.57	153.6	43.6
1994	4,315,000	200,000	95,000	105,000	46.0	21.9	24.1	6.56	153.4	42.9
1995	4,324,000	200,000	96,000	104,000	45.7	22.0	23.7	6.56	152.0	42.7
1996	4,347,000	200,000	93,000	108,000	45.8	21.2	24.6	6.55	149.2	43.7
1997	4,405,000	202,000	93,000	108,000	45.5	21.1	24.5	6.53	147.1	43.7
1998	4,450,000	204,000	97,000	107,000	45.4	21.6	23.8	6.50	145.8	42.8
1999	4,475,000	204,000	99,000	105,000	45.2	21.9	23.3	6.42	141.6	42.1
2000	4,584,000	204,000	90,000	114,000	45.0	19.8	25.2	6.36	139.2	45.1
2001	4,857,000	212,000	91,000	121,000	44.7	19.2	25.5	6.31	136.0	45.7
2002	5,140,000	226,000	95,000	131,000	44.3	18.7	25.7	6.23	133.1	46.4
2003	5,351,000	231,000	96,000	135,000	43.5	18.1	25.4	6.09	130.0	47.0
2004	5,533,000	233,000	97,000	137,000	42.3	17.5	24.8	5.92	126.8	47.6
2005	5,683,000	237,000	96,000	141,000	41.7	16.9	24.8	5.81	123.4	48.2
2006	5,810,000	241,000	94,000	148,000	41.4	16.1	25.3	5.74	119.9	49.3
2007	5,939,000	242,000	91,000	151,000	40.8	15.3	25.5	5.64	116.1	50.4
2008	6,091,000	246,000	89,000	157,000	40.3	14.5	25.8	5.56	112.2	51.5
2009	6,260,000	248,000	86,000	162,000	39.7	13.8	25.9	5.45	108.5	52.6
2010	6,437,000	250,000	84,000	166,000	38.9	13.1	25.8	5.33	104.4	53.7
2011	6,612,000	253,000	82,000	171,000	38.3	12.5	25.8	5.21	100.6	54.6
2012	6,789,000	255,000	81,000	174,000	37.6	11.9	25.6	5.06	97.1	55.5
2013	6,965,000	254,000	79,000	175,000	36.5	11.4	25.1	4.87	93.6	56.3
2014	7,141,000	254,000	80,000	174,000	35.5	11.2	24.3	4.70	91.2	56.4
2015	7,315,000	253,000	78,000	174,000	34.6	10.7	23.8	4.55	88.1	57.2
2016	7,494,000	255,000	75,000	180,000	34.0	10.0	24.0	4.47	84.6	58.4
2017	7,678,000	258,000	76,000	182,000	33.6	9.9	23.7	4.39	82.1	58.7
2018	7,861,000	260,000	73,000	187,000	33.1	9.3	23.8	4.29	79.2	59.8
2019	8,047,000	262,000	73,000	189,000	32.5	9.1	23.5	4.19	76.7	60.3
2020	7,913,000	255,000	74,000	181,000	32.2	9.3	22.9	4.08	78.8	59.7
2021	8,095,000	256,000	73,000	183,000	31.6	9.0	22.6	3.98	76.3	60.3
2022	8,277,000	257,000	71,000	187,000	31.1	8.5	22.5	3.88	73.9	61.3
2023	8,461,000	259,000	70,000	189,000	30.6	8.3	22.3	3.79	71.6	61.8
2024					30.1	8.2	21.9	3.70		
2025					29.5	8.1	21.4	3.61		

View source data.
View source data.
View source data.
View source data.

=== Demographic and Health Surveys ===
Total Fertility Rate (TFR) (Wanted Fertility Rate) and Crude Birth Rate (CBR):

Year	CBR (Total)	TFR (Total)	CBR (Urban)	TFR (Urban)	CBR (Rural)	TFR (Rural)
2008	31.5	5.1 (4.5)	27.3	3.8 (3.4)	33.4	5.8 (5.2)
2013	35.7	4.9 (4.2)	29.5	3.5 (3.0)	38.2	5.7 (4.9)
2019	30.0	4.2 (3.8)	26	3.1 (2.9)	33	5.1 (4.7)

== Ethnic groups ==
18 native African tribes 90% (Temne 30.5%, Mende 29.2%, Fula 12.4% Limba 6.4%, Kono 4.4%, Mandingo 2.4, Creole 1.2%, other 13.5%)
Creole (descendants of freed Jamaican slaves who were settled in the Freetown area in the late-18th century)
Refugees from Liberia's recent civil war
Small numbers of Lebanese

== Languages ==
English (official, regular use limited to literate minority)
Mende (principal vernacular in the south)
Temne (principal vernacular in the north)
Fula (principal language in Sierra Leone, it is also strongly and widely spoken across West Africa and beyond...)
Krio (English-based Creole, spoken by the descendants of freed American and West Indian slaves and Liberated Africans who were settled in the Freetown area, a lingua franca and a first language for 10% of the population but understood by 95%)

== Religion ==
Muslim 77.1%, Christian 22.9% (2019 est.)
