= Women in Sierra Leone =

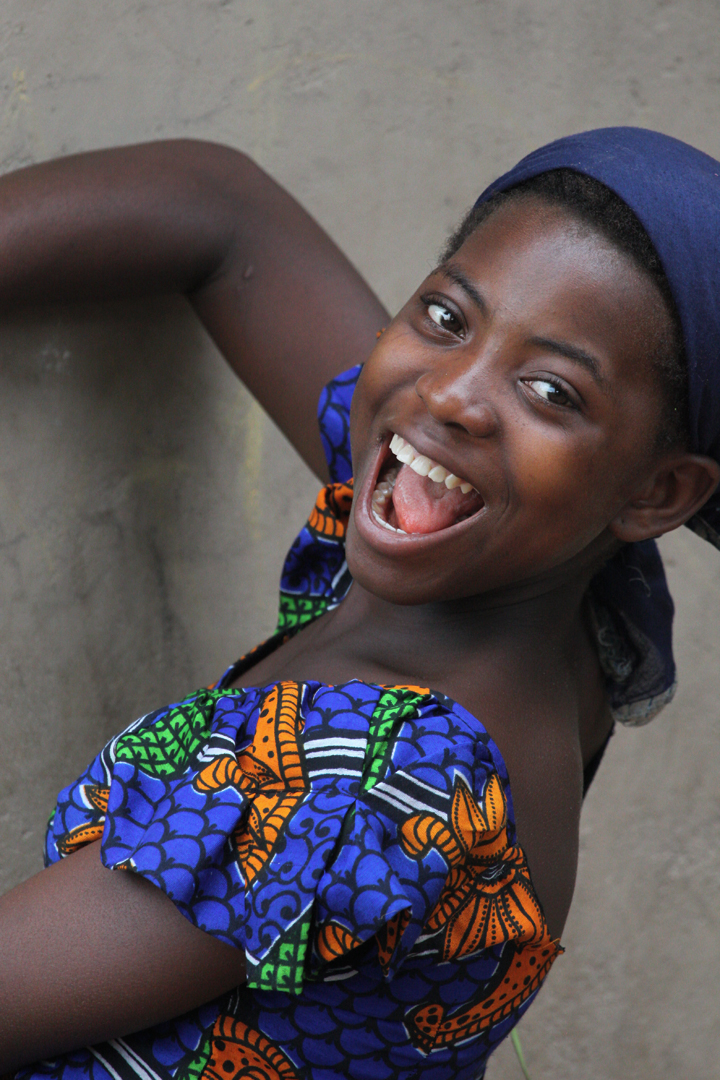
- Sierra Leonean woman in traditional dress

General statistics
- Maternal mortality (per 100,000): 890 (2010)
- Women in parliament: 12.4% (2013)
- Women over 25 with secondary education: 9.5% (2012)
- Women in labour force: 65.7% (2012)

Gender Inequality Index
- Value: 0.633 (2021)
- Rank: 162nd out of 191

Global Gender Gap Index
- Value: 0.672 (2022)
- Rank: 109th out of 146

Sierra Leone, officially the Republic of Sierra Leone, is a Constitutional Republic in West Africa. Since it was founded in 1792, the women in Sierra Leone have been a major influence in the political and economic development of the nation.

Sierra Leonean women face extreme gender inequality. They experience high levels of poverty, violence, and exclusion. Nevertheless, they have also played an important role in the education system, founding schools and colleges, with some such as Hannah Benka-Coker being honoured with the erection of a statue for her contributions and Lati Hyde-Forster, first woman to graduate from Fourah Bay College being honored with a doctor of civil laws degree by the University of Sierra Leone.

== Early history (1787–1900) ==
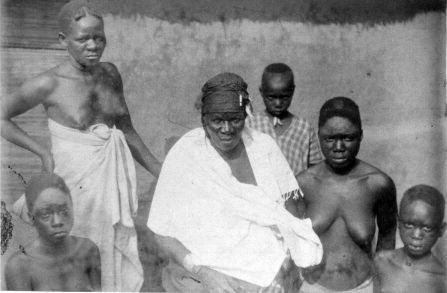
Madam Lehbu, queen of Upper Gaura in 1891.

With the establishment of the Province of Freedom in 1787, a Sherbro known as Queen Yamacouba was a signatory to the treaty of 1787 which ceded the land to the British.

After the destruction of the Province of Freedom in 1789 and the establishment of Freetown and the Colony of Sierra Leone in 1792, all heads of Nova Scotian Settler households were eligible to vote in the upcoming elections in Freetown and one-third were ethnic African women.

The majority of the ancestors of the Sierra Leone Creole people were repatriated African American, Jamaican Maroon and Liberated African women principally of Akan, Igbo and Yoruba extraction. Creole households in Freetown were different from traditional African ethnic groups in Sierra Leone in that women had property rights and economic freedom and qualified as professionals such as lawyers and doctors in the early twentieth century. This independence gave women the freedom to travel. As they were financially independent, they were able to divorce to improve their lives economically.

From 1830, the women in Sierra Leone were well known for their trading of non-slave-related items. A notable woman trader of the period was Liberated African Betsy Carew who had married a butcher, James Thomas, and sold meat to the army.

The Creole female traders were Christian. Creole women traded along the entirety of the West Coast expanding both their trade and spreading the Christian religion. However, by 1900 European companies began to dominate trade and the Creoles moved to other professions such as medicine and teaching.

In 1878, Madam Yoko became the Queen of Kpaa Mende Seneghum, which had become one of the largest political alliances within the interior. She also went to war against smaller tribes to increase her holdings. In 1898 she supported the British during a rebellion, which also allowed her to expand her holdings. At the time of her death in 1906, her confederacy had become so large it had to be divided into 15 chiefdoms.

T J. Alldridge the first commissioner of Sierra Leone reported signing peace treaties with two women chiefs in 1889.

== 1900–1970 ==
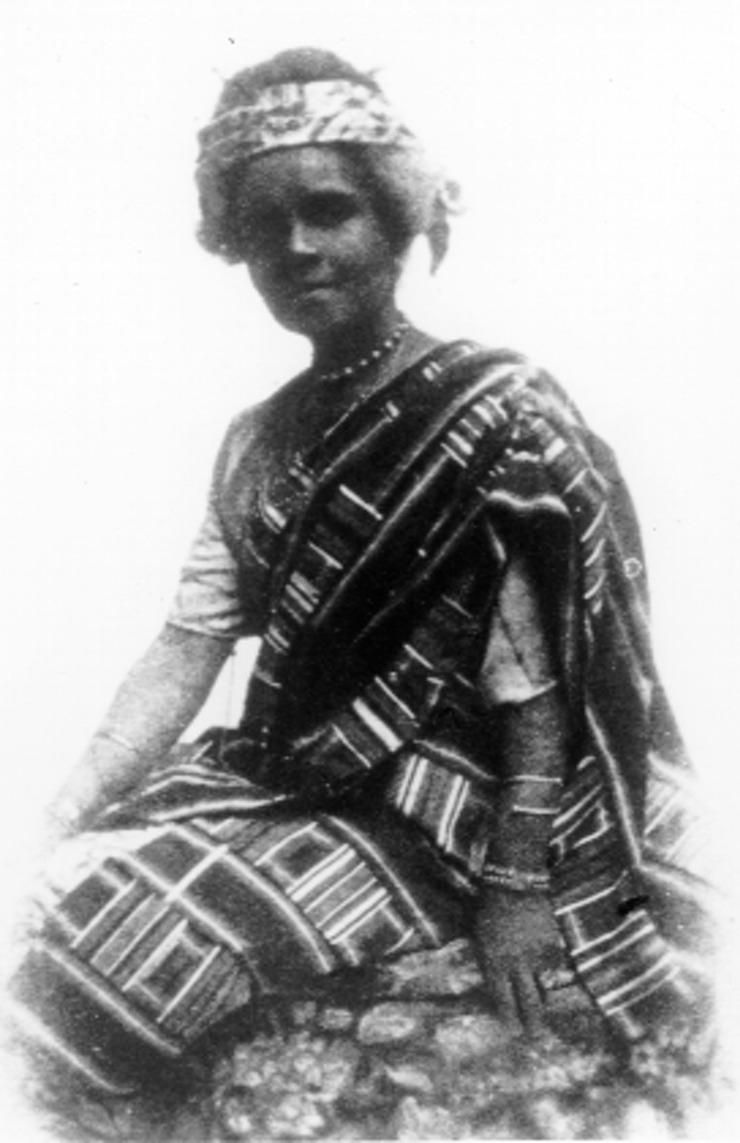
Adelaide Casely Hayford, Creole woman dressed in Fante attire on her wedding day

In the city of Freetown, before World War I a woman's position was decided on either class or ethnicity. The Creole people were the dominant ethnic group, with some having access to a better education, the wealthier families had their daughters sent to British finishing schools. The majority of Creole women however fell into the lower classes and their education usually did not go beyond elementary school level in a similar vein to their male counterparts of the same class.

In 1915, Adelaide Casely-Hayford played an important part regarding women's rights in Freetown giving a lecture on "The rights of Women and Christian Marriage". In 1923 she founded the "Girls Industrial and Technical Training School" with the aim to make women self-sufficient economically. In 1930 women were given the right to vote, according to local lawyer J. C. Zizer this could be attributed to the numbers of women who now worked in the civil service where their employment terms were equal to their male counterparts.

In 1938, Constance Cummings-John was the first woman in Africa to be elected to a municipal council and she was the first woman to be elected Mayor of Freetown. Her actions led to the formation of the Sierra Leone Market Women's Union and the Washerwoman's Union. In 1952 she founded the Sierra Leone Women's Movement as well as a newspaper. She founded the Eleanor Roosevelt Preparatory School for Girls and funded it from the proceeds of her quarrying business.

In 1943, Frances Wright was called to the bar, becoming the first female lawyer in Sierra Leone, she was also given an appointment by the government as a magistrate. She was a legal adviser to the British High Commission in Freetown and was considered a champion of women's rights.

In 1957, four women ran for parliament: Patience Richards, Constance Cummings-John, Ellen G.A. Caulker and Mrs. C.T. Williams. Cummings-John and Richards both won their bids but their party filed electoral petitions against them, preventing them from taking their seats.

In 1960 the National Congress of Sierra Leone Women (NCSLW), led by Nancy Steele was founded as a women's wing of the All People's Congress (APC).

Two female candidates stood for parliamentary seats in 1967: Yema Catherine Williams and Julie Keturah Kayode.

In the 1973 general election Nancy Steele and Ester Lily Coker stood for election as independent candidates. By now Sierra Leone had become a one-party state and their campaigns were unsuccessful.

1978 saw Nancy Steele as the sole woman to stand for parliament in the general election.

== 1970 - 1990 ==
In 1970, out of the 81 chiefdoms in Sierra Leone, 10 were led by women.

In 1989, UNICEF reported that on average a woman in Sierra Leone worked up to 16 hours a day and that the majority were surviving on just one meal per day. There was a maternal mortality rate of 70% primarily from infections and malnutrition.

== 1990 - 2002 ==
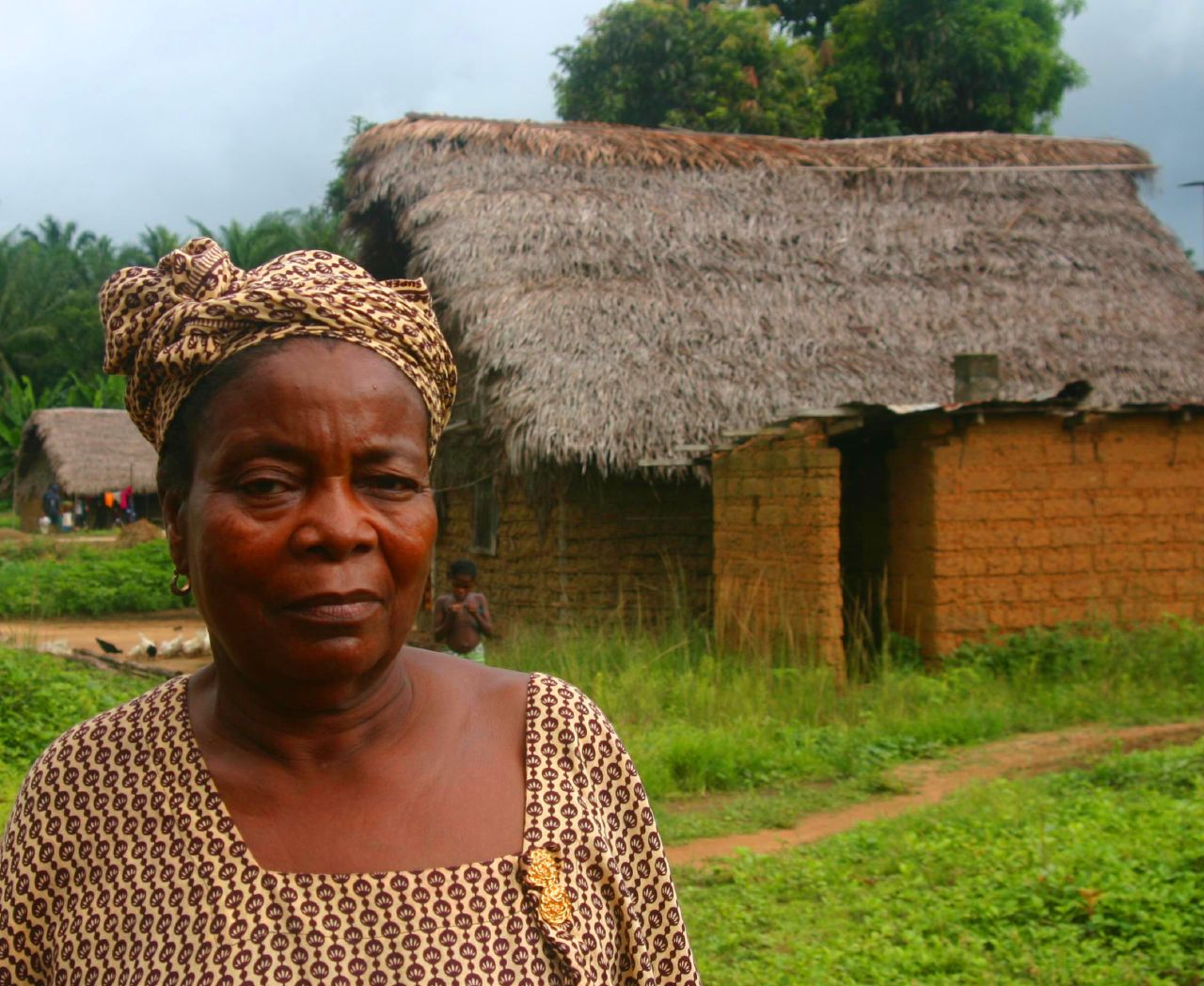
A Mende woman in a Sierra Leone village.

Women were greatly impacted by the civil war in Sierra Leone that took place from 1991 to 2002. Women were impacted by the violence as soldiers and civilians. A number of women and girls became soldiers with the Revolutionary United Front (RUF).

Gendered violence was a widespread tactic by the perpetuators of war. A report by the Truth and Reconciliation Commission stated that thousands of women and girls were abducted from their homes and suffered physical-, sexual- and psychological abuse, including rape and forced pregnancy. Many of them were subject to servitude, slavery and forced cannibalism while others were drugged, tortured and murdered. Sierra Leonean women and girls who endured forced pregnancies and gave birth to children by their abusers faced severe social consequences, including social isolation.

Women organized during the war to improve their conditions. One group founded the Sierra Leone Women's Movement for Peace, and using peaceful protests attempted to mediate peace between the warring factions. Women played a large role in ending the war through other organizations as well. In these efforts, "They lobbied, advocated and raised consciousness about violence...The women called for elections leading to a democratically elected president and parliament." They were successful their demands for "elections before peace", opposing the call by the National Provisional Ruling Council, the nation's leading organization at the time, to create "peace before elections."

Many organizations that were founded and ran by women to promote wellbeing during the war were formalized and popularized during the civil war. One, the Forum for African Women Educationalists (FAWE) (Sierra Leone), improved educational and training access for homeless children during wartime, setting up schools in Grafton, outside of Freetown. FAWE was established by the then minister of education, Christian Thorpe, in 1995. Other women's groups worked with United Nations groups like UNICEF and United Nations Development Fund for Women to educate school-aged children and young women in refugee and internal displacement camps. Some leaders of these groups went on to found an international women's organization: the Mano River Women's Peace Network (MARWOPNET). The group is made of organizations in Guinea, Sierra Leone, Liberia, and Ivory Coast, and Nigeria.

In 1994, inspired by the Sierra Leone Association of University Women (SLAUW), a group created the Women's Forum Sierra Leone, an organization that included every the women's association and group in Sierra Leone." This unifying force provided a large force for women's advocacy. Their interests varied in specific projects but centered around women's issues. "These ranged from equality of opportunity in all spheres of national development and growth, to the prevention of violence against women and their families, and to the restoration of peace and democracy in Sierra Leone."

== 2003 - present ==
On June 14, 2007, the Parliament of Sierra Leone passed three laws which made wife-beating illegal, allowed women to inherit property and protected women from forced marriage. However, in 2014, 63% of women aged 15–49 still held the belief that male partners were justified in hitting and beating their female partners under certain circumstances.

The 2007 Domestic Violence Act is rarely enforced as survivors are required to submit a medical report to the police. The majority of women in Sierra Leone cannot afford to pay the medical examination fee nor can they afford the cost of a lawyer to represent them. Many women in the rural areas of Sierra Leone still are not aware that domestic violence is a crime or of their rights.

In 2012, 10,000 Sierra Leonean men participated in a project called Husband School where they learned about gender equality, domestic violence, reproductive health, female genital mutilation and family planning. Husband School is organized by United Nations Population Fund (UNFPA) and the Fambul Initiative Network for Equality Sierra Leone (FINE-SL). Attendance is enforced by local Paramount Chiefs.

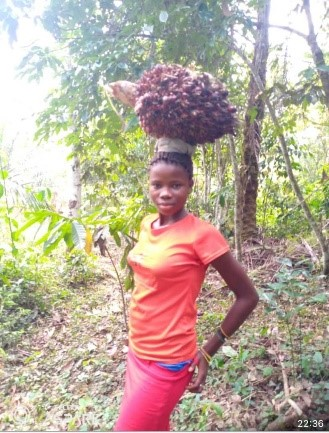
Woman harvesting palm fruit in Sierra Leone

The adoption of Registration of Customary Marriages and Divorce Act made 18 the legal age for marriage. Prior to this, there was no minimum age for marriage nor was consent from both parties a prerequisite. In rural Sierra Leone, it was not uncommon for girls under the age of 13 to be given in marriage to elderly men. The law aims to protect women and girls from forced marriage as well as physical, sexual and financial abuse.

In January 2023 the Gender Equality and Women’s Empowerment Act (GEWE) was signed into law in Sierra Leone. It mandates 30% of public and private positions be reserved for women (including in parliament), provides for increased workplace training opportunities for women, allows women fourteen weeks of maternity leave, punishes discrimination against women who seek access to financial services or resources, requires equal pay for women and men working in the same job, and requires yearly reviews of the GEWE’s implementation in public and private institutions.

== Reproductive rights in Sierra Leone ==
Women in Sierra Leone have extremely limited reproductive rights. Until 2007, women and girls could still be given in marriage by their families without their consent.

Sierra Leone has one of the world's highest maternal and infant mortality rates.

Contraception is used by 16% of adult women in Sierra Leone and 7.8% of teenage girls.

In 2013, Sierra Leone had the 7th highest teen pregnancy rate in the world. 38% of Sierra Leonean women aged 20–24 had given birth to their first baby before the age of 18. Teenage pregnancy is a major contributing factor to Sierra Leone's high maternal mortality rate as teenage mothers have a 40%-60% risk of dying in childbed. Babies born to teenage mothers have a 50% higher risk of being stillborn or dying shortly after birth than babies born to mothers over the age of 20.

=== Abortion ===
Abortion is illegal in Sierra Leone under any circumstances. The law banning abortion was passed in 1861, under the British colonial government. In 2015, President Ernest Bai Koroma refused to sign the Safe Abortion Act, due to opposition from religious leaders, and said that the issue should be put to a referendum. Unsafe abortions account for 10% of maternal deaths.

In 2022, the government backed a "risk-free motherhood" bill to legalise abortion. The cabinet of President Julius Maada Bio unanimously supported the bill, which is slated to be submitted to Parliament.

=== Female genital mutilation ===
Excluding Sierra Leone Creole women who do not practice or engage in female genital mutilation, 9 out of 10 girls and women in Sierra Leone have undergone female genital mutilation, often as part of the traditional Bundu or Bondu initiation ceremony into the Sande society. Generally in Sierra Leone, where literacy levels among women is less than forty percent, there is still a positive view of female genital mutilation. Two-thirds of girls and women undergo the practice between ages 5 and 14.

== Women Pioneers of Sierra Leone ==
The names are placed in chronological order:

=== Academics ===
- First Sierra Leonean woman to earn a PhD: Enid Rosamund Ayodele Forde.
- First West African to earn a diploma from the Royal College of Arts: Kathleen Mary Easmon Simango.
- First West African woman to complete a BA degree in the Liberal Arts: Edna Elliott-Horton.
- First woman to graduate Fourah Bay College Lati Hyde-Forster.
- First African woman to be awarded a Fellowship of the Institution of Civil Engineers: Trudy Morgan.
- First woman graduate of the Evangelical College of Theology (Sierra Leone Bible College): Rev. Victoria Gladys Coker 1995.
- First woman to head the English Department at Fourah Bay College: Dr. Kadi Sesay.

=== Politics ===
- First woman to become queen Queen of Kpaa Mende Seneghum: Madam Yoko, 1878.
- First woman elected to a municipal council: Constance Cummings-John, 1938.
- First woman member of the Moyamba District Council, Ella Koblo Gulama, 1957.
- First woman member of the House of Representatives of Sierra Leone: Ella Koblo Gulama, 1957.
- First women to win seats in parliament: Constance Cummings-John and Patience Richards, 1957.
- First woman to run as an independent candidate for parliament: Mrs. C.T.Williams, 1957.
- First woman member Cabinet Minister: Ella Koblo Gulama, 1962.
- First woman mayor of Freetown: Constance Cummings-John, 1966.
- First woman ambassador to Ethiopia, Tanzania and Zambia: Shirley Gbujama, 1976.
- First woman ambassador to the United Nations: Shirley Gbujama, 1978.
- First woman to be Minister of Development and Economic Planning: Dr. Kadi Sesay, 1999.
- Gender equality advocacy organization 50/50 Group of Sierra Leone is established: Dr. Nemata Majeks-Walker, 2001.
- First woman to be Minister of Sierra Leone Minister of Trade and Industry: Dr. Kadi Sesay, 2002.
- First woman to head the National Commission for Democracy and Human Rights: Dr. Kadi Sesay.
- First female Minister of Health: Agnes Taylor-Lewis
- First woman Chief Electoral Commissioner of Sierra Leone: Christiana Ayoka Mary Thorpe.
- First woman to run for vice-president Dr. Kadi Sesay, 2012.
- First woman head regional operations for the All People's Congress (APC): Diana Finda Konomanyi, 2010.
- First woman Minister of Local Government and Rural Development: Diana Finda Konomanyi, 2012.
- First woman Minister of Lands, Country Planning, and the Environment: Diana Finda Konomanyi, 2015.
- First woman head regional operations for Sierra Leone Peoples Party (SLPP): Emma Kowa-Jalloh, 2018
- First woman to run for president: Femi Claudius Cole, 2018.
- Second women to run for vice-president: Isata Dora Bangura, 2018.
- First woman attorney general and minister Dr. Priscilla Schwartz, 2018.

=== Professions ===
- First non-white person to be appointed to the senior judiciary of England and Wales: Dame Linda Penelope Dobbs.
- First Sierra Leonean woman to qualify as a medical doctor: Irene Ighodaro (Irene Wellesley-Cole), c. 1942.
- First woman in Africa appointed as Permanent Secretary in the Civil Service: Murietta Olu-Williams, 1962.
- First woman to qualify as a lawyer in Sierra Leone and West Africa: Stella Thomas, circa 1940.
- First Sierra Leonean woman to be called to the Bar in Great Britain and second woman to practice law in Sierra Leone, Frances Claudia Wright OBE, 1943.
- First Sierra Leonean jurist sworn in as Commissioner of the African Commission on Human and Peoples Rights: Jamesina Essie Leonora King.
- First woman judge: Agnes Macaulay, circa 1970.
- First woman Chief Justice of the Supreme Court of Sierra Leone: Umu Hawa Tejan-Jalloh, circa 1970.
- First woman appointed Justice of the Supreme Court of Sierra Leone: Patricia Macaulay, 1994.
- First woman of African descent to study drama at the Guildhall School of Music and Drama: Jeillo Edwards.
- First Sierra Leonean woman CNN anchor: Isha Sesay, 2005.
- First black singer to feature on BBC Radio: Evelyn Mary Dove, 1939.
- First Sierra Leonean to win an Emmy award: Nzinga Christine Blake.

=== Athletics ===
- First woman to represent Sierra Leone at the Olympics: Eugenia Osho-Williams, 1980.
- First women to win gold in the Heptathlon at the IAAF World Championships in Athletics: Eunice Barber, 1999.
- First women to win gold in the long jump at the All Africa Games: Eunice Barber, 1995.
- First women to win gold in the long jump at the IAAF World Championships in Athletics: Eunice Barber, 2003.
- First woman founder of a football club: Isha Johansen, 2004.
- First woman president of the Sierra Leone Football Association (SLFA): Isha Johansen 2013.

== Timeline of women's rights in Sierra Leone ==
1938

- Constance Cummings-John becomes the first woman in Sierra Leone and all of Africa to be elected to a municipal council.

1957

- Patience Richards (SLPP), Constance Cummings-John (SLPP), Ellen G.A. Caulker of the United Sierra Leone People's Party (UPP) and Mrs. C.T. Williams are the first women in Sierra Leone to run for parliament.

2007

On June 14, 2007, the Parliament of Sierra Leone passed three laws which made wife-beating illegal, allowed women to inherit property and protected women from forced marriage.

2012

- The 30% Gender Party Quota Bill is drafted by women's rights activists Nemata Majeks-Walker, Barbara Bangura and Salamatu Kamara and submitted to parliament but it does not pass into law.

2015

- The 2015 Safe Abortion Act is submitted to parliament by Isata Kabia on 8 December 2015.

2023

- In January 2023 the Gender Equality and Women’s Empowerment Act (GEWE) was signed into law in Sierra Leone. It mandates 30% of public and private positions be reserved for women (including in parliament), provides for increased workplace training opportunities for women, allows women fourteen weeks of maternity leave, punishes discrimination against women who seek access to financial services or resources, requires equal pay for women and men working in the same job, and requires yearly reviews of the GEWE’s implementation in public and private institutions.

== See also ==
- Female genital cutting in Sierra Leone
- Women in Africa
