= Salamatu Kamara =

Sierra Leonean educator, politician, and women's rights activist

Salamatu Kamara is a Sierra Leonean educator, politician and women's rights activist. She is the co-ordinator at the Tamarameh Gender Development Group.

== Early life and education ==
Kamara is a widowed mother of four children. She is the proprietor of the Annie Potter Primary School in Sierra Leone. She is a Temne.

She received her education at the Evangelical College of Theology.

== Politics ==
Kamara is a member of the All People's Congress (APC) political party. She is a woman's rights activist and is the co-ordinator for the Tamarameh Gender Development Group an organization aimed at providing micro-credit finance for women entrepreneurs. Her work focuses on creating spaces for women in Sierra Leone's political process as well as grassroots community organizing.

In 2008, Kamara was nominated to stand in local elections. During her campaign she experienced repeated threats of gender violence and harassment. She won the party nomination at the constituency level but the decision was overturned by the APC nominating committee at the national level in favor of her male opponent Mustapha Maju Kanu. Kamara's name was struck off on a duplicate nomination letter and replaced with Kanu's.

Kamara stood for election again in 2012 as an APC candidate but did not win the seat.

== Gender Equality Draft Bill ==
Kamara helped draft the Gender Equality Draft Bill with Bernadette Lahai and Barbara Bangura. The bill sought a 30% representation quota of women in Sierra Leone's political process.

She was one of the subjects of the short film 30% (Women and Politics in Sierra Leone) by Anna Cady, Em Cooper and Jenny Cuffe. It was an official selection for the Sundance Film Festival in 2013. The film explores the gender equality challenges women in Sierra Leone are facing, including violence, corruption and the foundational patriarchy of all-male secret societies such as the Poro Society.
