= Lara Taylor-Pearce =

Auditor general of Sierra Leone

Lara Taylor-Pearce is an auditor and civil servant, best known for her work as auditor general of Sierra Leone from 2011 to 2021. Taylor-Pearce gained international attention for her work exposing corruption during the 2014–2016 Ebola pandemic response, conducting a real-time audit of Ebola relief funds that highlighted faulty documentation of government spending and led to the recovery of several billion leones. She received the National Integrity Award from the Anti-Corruption Commission of Sierra Leone in 2015, and was made a Grand Officer of the Order of the Rokel in 2017.

In November 2021, Sierra Leone President Julius Bio abruptly suspended both Taylor-Pearce and her deputy without explanation, and a tribunal was set up to investigate Taylor-Pearce's office. Civil society groups and members of the legal community have criticized the lack of transparency and proper procedure surrounding the suspension, and investigative media have since alleged that Taylor-Pearce's suspension was retaliation for her discovery of financial irregularities related to the President's Office.

== Early life and education ==
As a youth, Lara Taylor-Pearce attended the Annie Walsh Memorial School. She completed an undergraduate degree in economics at Fourah Bay College and an MBA in Leadership and Sustainability at the University of Cumbria.

== Career ==
Taylor-Pearce has held positions at the Institutional Reform and Capacity Building Project, the Public Sector Management Support Project, the Accountant General's Department of the Ministry of Finance, and KPMG Peat Marwick. She is a fellow of the Institute of Chartered Accountants of Sierra Leone and the Association of Chartered Certified Accountants. She has previously served as board member for Afrobarometer, vice-chair for the INTOSAI Development Initiative board, and chair for the governing board of the African Region of Supreme Audit Institutions—English Speaking.

=== Auditor general ===
In 2007, Taylor-Pearce joined the Audit Service Sierra Leone as deputy auditor general. In 2011, she was appointed the auditor general of Sierra Leone. Over the next five years, she put forward more than 900 recommendations in support of improving the management of public finances. During the 2014–2016 Ebola pandemic response in Sierra Leone, Taylor-Pearce conducted a real-time financing audit of relief funds, exposing corruption and gaining international attention for her efforts to improve government accountability. For the period of May to October 2014, more than 84 billion leones in Ebola funds (US$19,000,000) had been spent by government; Taylor-Pearce reported that 30% of the money had been disbursed without clear receipts or documentation to prove where it was going. Public reaction to the audit report was strong, and the opposition Sierra Leone People's Party called for the government to launch a public inquiry into the mismanagement of Ebola funds. As a result of the audit, at least three billion leones were eventually recovered by the Public Accounts Committee of the Parliament of Sierra Leone.

Taylor-Pearce received the National Integrity Award from the Anti-Corruption Commission of Sierra Leone in 2015, followed by an integrity award from NGO Accountability Now Sierra Leone in 2016. In recognition of her service to the country, she was made a Grand Officer of the Order of the Rokel in April 2017. That year, Taylor-Pearce signed a memorandum of understanding with the Office of the Auditor General of Norway to support the professional development and training of Audit Service Sierra Leone auditors.

==== 2021 suspension ====
In November 2021, Sierra Leone President Julius Bio abruptly suspended both Taylor-Pearce and her deputy without explanation, and it was announced that the attorney general would be organizing a tribunal to investigate Taylor-Pearce's office. The suspension occurred shortly before Taylor-Pearce's team was scheduled to share its audit of the government's 2020 handling of public finances, and the move was criticized by multiple civil society groups. Lawyer Basita Michael, a former president of the Sierra Leone Bar Association, expressed concern that the tribunal was being established without any clear allegation of misconduct having been presented, and she resigned from the government's Judicial and Legal Service Commission in protest.

Acting auditor general Abdul Aziz was appointed, and on 8 December 2021 he presented the Annual Audit Report for fiscal year 2020 to Parliament. After a comparison of the report with original audit documents, investigative media outlet Africanist Press reported that evidence related to financial irregularities in the President's Office and Office of the First Lady had been omitted from the final report, and alleged that Taylor-Pearce's suspension had been retaliation for her insistence on the inclusion of this evidence. Newsletter Africa Confidential was critical of the claim that evidence had been suppressed, but reported that, according to government insiders, Bio's communications team had attempted to conceal an emergency trip abroad for the president to receive medical treatment in 2020—along with related expenses and irregular reimbursements—and that Taylor-Pearce's discovery of this concealment had caused long-term tensions between Audit Service Sierra Leone and President Bio to escalate.

When the tribunal proceedings began on 17 March 2022, Taylor-Pearce had filed a supreme court action against the state, arguing that her suspension and the tribunal "was unconstitutional and beyond the legal authority of the President." As of October 2023, Taylor-Pearce had not been reinstated as auditor general. A Sierra Leone Telegraph article noted that investigation by authorities over the past two years had not revealed any evidence of misconduct in the auditor general's office.
