= Presidential Award =

Civilian award of Sierra Leone, bestowed by the president

- Type: Order
- Awarded for: For diligent and dedicated services to Sierra Leone.
- Country: Sierra Leone
- Presented by: The President of Sierra Leone
- Established: 1972

Precedence
- Next (higher): Order of the Republic; Order of the Rokel

The Presidential Award is a decoration established by President Siaka Stevens to honour Sierra Leoneans in recognition of "diligent and dedicated services" to Sierra Leone.

== History ==
The medal was established in 1972 by President Siaka Stevens, and ranks below the Orders of the Republic and the Rokel. It is awarded in gold and silver classes.

A ceremony where the President of Sierra Leone presents the insignia takes place annually on Independence Day, 27 April.

== Notable recipients ==
=== Gold ===
- Ahmadiyya Mission, 2013
- Alhaji Alie Menjor Sesay, 2014 – Trade.
- Alhaji Alusine Largbo, 2014 – Trade.
- Alari Francess Shaw, 2014 – Government.
- Brima Mazola Kamara
- Catholic Relief Services (CRS), 2013
- Combined Artists Wan Pot Comedians, 2013
- Cordelia Jean Marian Sankoh – Music.
- Edmund Foday Kabba, 2013
- Emmerson Bockarie, 2013
- Ernestine Constance Omorlade Macaulay, 2014 – Civil Service and the Public Sector.
- ENCISS (Enhancing the Interface between State & Civil Society), 2013
- Fatmata Juliet Tarawally, 2014 – Judiciary.
- Hassan Michael Gibateh, 2014 – Education.
- Isatu Ashmao Daramy, 2014 – Diplomacy.
- Kadiatu Conteh – Trade.
- Kelvin Doe, 2013
- Marian Mackie Scott, 2014 – Music.
- Mariatu Kargbo, 2014 – Culture.
- Mildred Abioseh Solomon, 2014 – Judiacy.
- Michael Ngegba, 2014 – Fisheries.
- Mohamed Momodu Bangura, 2014 – Railway work.
- Mohamed Kallon, 2013
- Momoh Bangura, 2013 – Assistant Superintendent of the Sierra Leone Police Force.
- Momoh Mohamed Kamara, 2014 – Artisan industry.
- Nabie Dumbuya, 2014 – Philanthropy.
- Prince Kuti-George, 2013
- Princess Modupeh Pearce, 2013
- Sherene Ranasinghe, 2014 – Diplomacy.
- Sue Ray, 2014 – Aviation.
- The Single Leg Amputee Sports Association (SLASA) – Amputee Sports.
- Umaru Bangura, 2017
- UN Women, 2015

=== Silver ===
- Aaron Aiah Boima, 2014 – Trade.
- Abdul Hakin Hamid, 2014 – Nation Fire Force.
- Abdulair Fornah, 2014 – Sierra Leone High Commission UK.
- Alimamy Morlai bangura, 2014 – National Fire Force.
- Brima Kamara, 2014 – Civil Service.
- Brima Mazzola Kamara, 2018 – for contributions to athletics.
- Fatmara Binta Kabba, 2014 – Civil service.
- Haja Ya Alimamy Conteh, 2013
- Janday Momoh, 2013
- Margaret Charley, 2013
- Millicent Rhodes, 2013
- Mohamed A. Nabay – Trade and vocational education.
- Salamatu Kamara – Fishery.
- Sgt. (Rtd.) Daniel F. Kargbo, 2013 – RSLAF.
- Wilhemina John, 2013

== See also ==
- Orders, decorations, and medals of Sierra Leone
- Order of the Republic
- Order of the Rokel
