= Em Cooper =

British filmmaker and animator

- Born: Em Cooper; Cambridge, England
- Education: Royal College of Art
- Occupations: Director, animator, editor, cinematographer
- Years active: 2007–present
- Website: emcooper.com

Em Cooper is a British filmmaker and animator. She is best known for her distinctive hand-painted oil-paint animation style and as the director of the oil-painted music video for The Beatles song "I'm Only Sleeping" released in 2022 and created with more than 1,300 of Cooper's oil paintings.

Her direction of the music video for "I'm Only Sleeping" won it the Grammy Award for Best Music Video at the 66th Grammy Awards. In 2023, the film also won the Jury Award for a Commissioned Film at Annecy International Animation Film Festival; Best Animation at the Shark Music Video Awards; Gold at the Creative Circle Awards (Best Music Video Animation). In 2018, Cooper was nominated for an Emmy for her animation sequences for the PBS features documentary Deej.

== Career ==
Born in Cambridge, England, Cooper works as an animator specialising in combining oil-painted animation with live-action film to create sequences which evoke a stream of consciousness, or portray subjective experience.

Early in her career, after graduating from the Royal College of Art in 2010, Cooper directed the animation sequences for Eric Steel's feature documentary Kiss The Water. The film received critical acclaim by the British press including Time Out, The Times, The Observer, The Financial Times and The Telegraph. The film was later named one of the ten best documentaries of the year by BBC film critic Mark Kermode. In 2015, the film was screened on BBC television.

In 2012, she co-directed the documentary 30%: Women and Politics in Sierra Leone with Anna Cady. The film premiered at the 2013 Sundance Film Festival. The film deals with difficulties faced by Sierra Leone's women to be fairly represented in politics and features Salam atu Kamara and Bernadette Lahai.

In 2015, Cooper created sequences for the Amazon Prime series Gortimer Gibbons Life on Normal Street. In 2018, she directed the Time to Get Out TV commercial for Berghaus voiced by Maxine Peake as well as the tv commercial for Andrex with the partnership of WaterAid and in 2021 she worked with Mark Seliger to co-direct the 2021 Stella Artois Christmas Ad, featuring Matt Damon.

Cooper's work has been screened at multiple film festivals including the European Psychoanalytic Film Festival (epff) in 2007 and the International Sándor Ferenczi Conference in Budapest, 2012/2013. In 2015, she won the Gradiva Award for film at the National Association for the Advancement of Psychoanalysis. In 2018, she directed oil-paint animated TV commercials for Berghaus as well as for Andrex with the partnership of Water Aid. In 2015, she directed the animation for the film Deej. The film was a reframed feature documentary directed by Robert Rooy and broadcast on PBS. In 2018, she was nominated for an Emmy Award for Deej under the Outstanding Art Direction and Graphic Design category. Deej was screened as part of America ReFramed on PBS World in the USA on 24 October 2017 and later won the Peabody Award in the USA.

== Filmography ==
| Year | Film | Role | Genre | Ref. |
|---|---|---|---|---|
| 2007 | Laid Down | Director, animator, writer, cinematographer | Short film | |
| 2010 | Confusion of Tongues | Director, animator, writer, cinematographer | Short film | |
| 2010 | The Nest | Director, animator, writer | Short film | |
| 2011 | Zlatka | Director, animator | Short promo film | |
| 2011 | Twelve Minutes of Love | Director, animator | Animated promo | |
| 2012 | Emergence | Director, animator | Live music and animation installation | |
| 2013 | 30% Women & Politics in Sierra Leone | Co-director, animator, cinematographer | Documentary short | |
| 2013 | Kiss The Water | Animation director | Documentary feature | |
| 2015 | Gortimer Gibbon’s Life on Normal Street | Animator | TV series | |
| 2017 | Deej | Animation director | Documentary feature | |
| 2018 | Worlds of Ursula K Le Guin | Animator | Documentary feature | |
| 2022 | "I'm Only Sleeping" | Director, animator | Music video | |
