= Female genital mutilation in Sierra Leone =

Female genital mutilation in Sierra Leone (also known as female genital cutting) is the common practice of removing all or part of the female's genitalia for cultural and religious initiation purposes, or as a custom to prepare them for marriage. Sierra Leone is one of 28 countries in Africa where female genital mutilation (FGM) is known to be practiced and one of few that has not banned it. It is widespread in part due to it being an initiation rite into the "Bondo," though initiation rite-related FGM was criminalised in 2019. The type most commonly practised in Sierra Leone is Type IIb, removal of part or all of the clitoris and the labia minora. As of 2013, it had a prevalence of 89.6%.

== Cultural reasons ==
FGM is regularly performed in Sierra Leone. The reason that FGM is common in Sierra Leone is because FGM is practiced in a 'secret society' called the Bondo society. The Bondo society is an all-female society (also known as the sande) in West Africa. Secret societies are ancient cultural institutions that play a major role in West Africa and have existed for hundreds of years. The purpose of this secret society is to help young women earn the rites of passage into adulthood. In order, to receive these rites of passage, a girl must undergo their cultural rituals including FGM.

The initiation into the society occurs in the Bondo bush which is a private enclosure constructed near their village. Time spent in the Bondo bush for initiation into womanhood used to take about a month, but as the generations have gone by, the time has significantly reduced. Once a woman becomes a member of the Bondo, she is able to go to the Bondo without her husband's permission. The Bondo becomes the only place women are allowed to go to without permission from their husband. Thus, women who are a part of the Bondo have an increased freedom of movement.

In regard to society, members of the Bondo are regarded as having a higher standing than other women. The cost of FGM and initiation into the Bondo society is quite expensive, and so parents are proud when their daughters are initiated because it shows they are financially stable and able to afford this. Initiation can cost anywhere from 200,000 to 600,000 Leones, which converts to 62–185 dollars. Soweis, the leaders of the Bondo, tend to raise the price of the initiation into the society if the woman is not a virgin. FGM is so expected in society that when a husband discovers upon marriage that his wife has not undergone FGM, it is common for him to pay for her to undergo the initiation.

Woman's initiation is synonymous with women's power in Sierra Leone, and the act of excision is a reminder that women are from which all human creation is derived. Bondo elders claim that excision improves sexual satisfaction as it removes focus from the clitoris onto the hidden g-spot inside the vaginal canal which they believe has more satisfying and intense orgasms. They also claim it enhances the appearance of a women's genitalia and make it easier to penetrate.

In Sierra Leone, FGM usually consists of removing the clitoris as a major part in preparing the young women for marriage and motherhood through this initiation ceremony. The procedure is usually performed by an elderly woman of the village who has been especially designated for this task (sowei), by a village barber or by a traditional birth attendant. FGM can be broken down into three types. Type I removes part of all of the clitoris. Type II removes the part of all of the clitoris, the clitoris itself, and part of or all of the labia minora. Type III, the most extreme case, involves removing all or part of the external genitalia and stitching the vaginal opening closed.

== Prevalence ==
Prevalence of FGM by region. Total prevalence of all regions is 90%.

Sierra Leone has the 5th highest rate of FGM in Africa.

In 2013, FGM in Sierra Leone had a prevalence of 89.6%. This is a slight decrease from previous surveys, and there is evidence of decline in younger age groups. The most common form of FGM practiced is Type IIb, removal of clitoral glans and removal of the labia minora. The second most common type was Type Ib, removal of the clitoral glans and prepuce.

In Sierra Leone, 40.2% of women from ages 15 to 49 who have experienced FGM underwent the procedure between the ages 10 and 14.

Sierra Leone has the highest prevalence of FGM in West Africa. In the MICS conducted by UNICEF, the prevalence of FGM in Sierra Leone, Gambia, Burkina Faso and Mauritania was 94%, 79%, 74%, and 72% respectively. In other countries in western Africa such as Ghana, Niger and Togo, the prevalence of FGM was less than 6%. The northern region has the highest prevalence and the Western the lowest: Northern 96.3%, Eastern 91.3%, Southern 88.6%, and Western 75.6%.

The predominantly Christian Creole people are the only ethnicity in Sierra Leone not known to practice FGM or participate in Bondo society rituals

== Legality ==
Initiation rite-related FGM was criminalised in 2019. However, it still remains legal as long as practiced outside of an initiation ritual. Sierra Leone is one of 28 countries in Africa where female genital mutilation (FGM) is known to be practiced and one of few that has not banned it.

== Health effects ==
Types of FGM. Type IIb is the most common in Sierra Leone, followed by type Ib.

There are no health benefits associated with FGM. The severity of the medical risks varies according to the extent of the cutting. In a 2013 study of 558 girls and women aged 12–47, 31.7% had type Ib; 64.1%, type IIb; and 4.2%, type IIc (4 participants refused the exam). Short-term effects of FGM include excessive bleeding, local infections, and incomplete healing. Long-term effects include scarring, genital ulcers, dermoid inclusion cysts, lower abdominal pain, and infertility. But the worst effect is death at delivery, the rate of which is excessively high in Sierra Leone

=== Types of Female Genital Mutilation ===
There are four classifications of Female Genital Mutilation (FGM). The health effects of FGM vary with the type of procedure undergone by each individual.

Classifications of FGM
Type 1	Partial or total removal of the clitoris and/or the prepuce (clitoridectomy)
Type 2	Partial or total removal of the clitoris and the labia minora, with or without excision of the labia majora (excision)
Type 3	Narrowing of the vaginal orifice with creation of a covering seal by cutting and appositioning the labia minora and/or the labia majora, with or without excision of the clitoris (infibulation)
Type 4	All other harmful procedures to the female genitalia for non-medical purposes, for example: pricking, piercing, incising, scraping and cauterization

=== Female Genital Mutilation Impact on Health ===
Sierra Leone is one out of twenty-eight African countries that practices Female Genital Mutilation. Almost 90% of Sierra Leonean women will undergo FGM. Most often the operation involves the use of blunt instruments such as razor blades, penknives, or broken glass.

Many women that have experienced FGM reported having severe pain, shock caused by pain, excessive bleeding (haemorrhage), swelling that makes it difficult to pass urine and feces, infections, and oedema. A study in Sierra Leone concluded that women who underwent FGM experienced excessive bleeding, tenderness, inability to heal well, difficulty when urinating, and infections such as Urinary Tract Infections (UTI's).

Female genital mutilation is followed by both short-term and long-term effects. Immediate signs of complications appear within a few hours and can last up to ten days after the procedure. Long-term problems were present more than ten days later and were associated with pregnancy affectations during labor and/or childbirth.

The most common short-term health complications involve hemorrhaging that can result in shock or death. Infection to the entire pelvic organs can occur which can lead to sepsis. Tetanus and gangrene can lead to death. Intense pain that causes shock during and after procedure. The use of blunt instruments can damage the adjoining organs. Lastly, urine retention occurs from swelling and/or blockage of the urethra.

Long-term health consequences associated with FGM include dermoid cysts and abscesses, chronic pelvic infections that can lead to chronic back and pelvic pain as well as urinary tract infections.

Other long-term complications involve painful and blocked menses (menstrual dysfunction) that can result in

1. hematocolpos - accumulation of menstrual blood in the vagina,
2. hematometra - accumulation of menstrual blood in the uterus, and
3. hematosalpinx - accumulation of menstrual blood in the fallopian tubes

In addition, sexual problems are more prevalent among women with FGM. Women with FGM reported having persistent pain during sexual intercourse. Furthermore, the penis may become obstructed from penetrating the vagina which can require a surgical procedure. And, sexual dysfunction such as the inability to attain an orgasm during copulation is also common.

Moreover, there is an increased risk of maternal and child morbidity due to obstructed labor. A recent study found higher death rates (including stillbirths) among infants born to mothers who have experienced FGM than mothers with no FGM. Women with Type I FGM were at 15% more likely, Type II women had a 32% increase, and Type III women had an overall 55% chance of experiencing death or stillbirth.

Chronic urinary tract infections, incontinentia urine (inability to control urination), infertility, abscesses, dermoid cysts, keloid scars (hardening of the scars) and increase risks to HIV infection are also associated with long-term health complications of FGM.

FGM can also result in psychological trauma. Notably, post-traumatic stress disorder, anxiety, depression, and psychosexual problems. Studies demonstrate that women with FGM are more likely to encounter psychological disturbances such as low self-esteem, somatization, and phobia.

== Community response ==
People in Sierra Leone believe that abandoning FGM would be an abandonment of cultural tradition. They believe that FGM is similar to male circumcision which is widely acceptable across the globe. FGM supporters in Sierra Leone believe that women who do not receive the circumcision will have trouble conceiving, suffer psychological trauma, have bad luck, or be considered unworthy of marriage. Women who are pro-FGM state that it does not oppress female sexuality and instead it celebrates it through these ritual practices.

They also state that the supposed consequences of excision (which include menstrual problems, painful sex, infections, et cetera) were not specific to women who underwent FGM. The rate for infertility is ten percent for both groups. They also argue that the reason for increase of still births in circumcised women is not because of the FGM they underwent but because they delay receiving prenatal care and visiting hospitals because they fear being stigmatized by the medical staff because of their circumcision.

FGM supporters believe that FGM prevents prostitution by decreasing a woman's sexual desire, and is more hygienic. According to a five-year research done by Hanny Lightfoot-Klein, an anti-FGM activist, 94% of circumcised women reported being satisfied by their sex lives and had sex between three and four times a week.

Anti-FGM advocates state that more than 80% of women who experience it reported suffering a minimum of one health complication. People against FGM widely refer to it as mutilation which is a controversial term that is rejected by members of communities who practice it. The World Health Organization has adopted this term and it is widely used to describe the injury made to the women's genitalia even though the intent was not to mutilate.

The Amazonian Initiative Movement is one of several nongovernmental organizations in West Africa against FGM. The aim of the group is to educate women who perform FGM and set them up with another job besides performing this procedure. The World Health Organization has consistently condemned this traditional practice as "willful damage to healthy organs for non-therapeutic reasons" and they have stated that the practice of female genital mutilation can result in infertility, pregnancy and childbirth complications, and psychological problems through inability to experience sexual pleasure. Supporters of the eradication of all forms of nonconsented genital cutting believe that it violates the human right to bodily integrity. However, Sierra Leone does not have an explicit law against the practice of FGM.

== See also ==
- Women in Sierra Leone
- Human rights in Sierra Leone
- Prevalence of female genital mutilation by country
