= Orders, decorations, and medals of Sierra Leone =

The present system of orders, decorations, and medals of Sierra Leone was introduced when the country became a republic in April 1971. Prior to that, medals were issued for the Dominion of Sierra Leone, which included the British honours system, which was last conferred on Sierra Leonean citizens in the 1971 New Year Honours. Awardees are entitled to post-nominal letters, which are unofficial. The awards include:

- Order of the Republic (three classes)
- Order of the Rokel (five classes)
- Decoration of Honour
- National Award Medal
- Presidential Award (Gold or Silver)

== See also ==
- Medals of Sierra Leone (1961–1971)
