= Order of the Rokel =

Order of the Republic
- Type: Order
- Awarded for: For dedicated and meritorious service to the Republic of Sierra Leone.
- Country: Sierra Leone
- Presented by: The President of Sierra Leone
- Established: 1972

Precedence
- Next (higher): Order of the Republic
- Next (lower): Presidential Award

The Order of the Rokel is the second order of Sierra Leone, after the Order of the Republic. It may be awarded to recognize Sierra Leoneans who have distinguished themselves by making valuable contributions to the country in the areas of to the public service, arts and sciences, and philanthropy. The award is normally awarded by the President of Sierra Leone.

Sierra Leonean awards, including the Order of the Rokel, do not have post-nominal titles and, while there are no official abbreviations, the most common used unofficially are GCOR (Grand Commander), COR (Commander), GOOR (Grand Officer), OOR (Officer) and MOR (Member).

== History ==
The Order was founded in 1972 by then-President of Sierra Leone, Siaka Stevens, who created the order with the aim of honoring Sierra Leoneans or foreign nationals for distinguished service to the country. It is named after the Rokel River, the largest river in Sierra Leone.

A ceremony to present insignia is undertaken annually by the President of Sierra Leone on Independence Day, 27 April.

== Classes ==
The order is composed of the following five classes:

- Grand Commander (GCOR)
- Commander (COR)
- Grand Officer (GOOR)
- Officer (OOR)
- Member (MOR)

== Notable recipients ==
=== Grand Commanders ===
- Brigadier Alfred Nelson-Williams, GCOR, 2007.
- Umu Hawa Tejan Jalloh, GCOR, 2008
- Joseph Opala, GCOR, 2012
- Bertha Yvonne Conton, GCOR, 2012.
- Valentine Thomas Collier, GCOR, 2013
- Abubakarr Multi-Kamara, GCOR, 2013 – Diplomacy.
- Adeliza Iyamide Showers, GCOR, 2013 – Judiciary.
- Alie Forna GCOR, 2014 – Rural Development and Micro-financing
- Andrew Karmoh Keili, GCOR, 2014 – Engineering and Politics.
- Brigadier (Rtd) Kellie Conteh, GCOR, 2014 – Security sector reform and founding the Office of the National Security.
- Dr. Thomas Kahota Kargbo, GCOR, 2014 – Medicine, politics and diplomacy.
- Justice Nyawoh Finda Matturi Jones, GCOR, 2014 – for services to the judiciary.
- Maude Regina Peacock, GCOR, 2014 – Education, gender equality and women’s empowerment.
- Vivian Margaret Solomon, GCOR, 2018 – Sierra Leone Supreme Court Justice.
- Ella Koblo Gulama, GCOR
- James Blyden Jenkins-Johnston, GCOR

=== Commanders ===
- Andrina Rose Coker, COR, 2013
- Alhaji Chernoh Maju, COR, 2013
- Alhaji Abdul Salam Noah, COR, 2014 – Entrepreneurship and Private Sector Development.
- Alhaji Soulaiman Basirou Daramy, COR, 2013 – Diplomacy.
- Binta Mansaray, COR, 2014 – service to the Special Court for Sierra Leone.
- David Richards, Baron Richards of Herstmonceux, COR – gallant leadership of the British Military intervention in the Sierra Leone Civil War.
- Dr. James Anthony Samba, COR, 2014 – Medicine.
- Frederick John Momodu Kamara, COR, 2014 – Social Welfare and Disability Issues.
- Gladys Ethel Omotunde Strasser-King, COR, 2014 – Commerce and Agriculture.
- Dr. James Caisa Boima, COR, 2013
- Jean-Raymond Boulle, COR, 2007 – for services in mining and trade.
- Reverend Moses Benson Khanu, COR, 2014 – Religion and the Human Rights.
- Sahr Matturi, COR, 2013
- Sahr Wonday, COR, 2013
- Sampha Bilo Kamara, COR, 2014 – For service to the Department of Prisons.
- Sorbie Ndigi Dumbuya, COR, 2014 – For service to the University of Sierra Leone.
- Sulaman Kabba Koroma, COR, 2014 – Law Profession.

=== Grand Officers ===
- Abdul Rashid Bayoh GOOR, 2014 – Education and civil service.
- Ahmid Munirr Fofanah, GOOR, 2014 – Local government and rural development.
- Aminata B. Kallay, GOOR, 2014 – Business and Consular Cooperation.
- Andrew Gbebay Bangali GOOR, 2014 – Civil service and diplomacy.
- Daniel Olatunji Cole GOOR, 2014 – Civil and public service.
- Ernest Sahid Alie Surrur, GOOR, 2013
- Francis Allieu Munu, GOOR, 2013
- Ishmael B. Peters, GOOR, 2014 – Medicines.
- Julius Fofanah Sandy, GOOR, 2014 – Education and civil service.
- Lara Taylor-Pearce, GOOR, 2017 – Auditor General of Sierra Leone.
- Michael A. J. Rekab, GOOR, 2014 – Dentistry.
- Patrick Eustace Coker, GOOR, 2014 – Medicines and sports.
- Samir Khattar Hassanyeh, GOOR, 2013

=== Officers ===
- Akiwande Josiah William Lasite, OOR, 2014 – Education.
- Bai Kurr Kanagbaro Sanka, OOR, 2018 – Paramount Chief, for services to the state.
- Brima Francis Bangura, OOR, 2014 – Government Printing Department.
- Clifford Rotimie Marcus Roberts, OOR, 2013
- Doreen Zephina Faux, OOR, 2014 – Civil Service.
- Gary Schulze, OOR, 2014 – Education, History and Culture.
- Haja Fatmata Binta Wurie, OOR, 2014 – Civil Service.
- Jane Goodall, OOR, 2019 – Services to wildlife conservation in Sierra Leone.
- Joseph Saidu Momoh, OOR, 1974 – Sierra Leone's second president.
- Horatio Karty Max-McCarthy, OOR, 2013
- Helen Chichia Keili, OOR, 2013
- Mohamed Nfah Alie Conteh, OOR, 2014 – service to National Electoral Commission.
- Rev. Dr. Usman Jesse Fornah, OOR, 2014 – Evangelism.
- Rev. Prophetess Margaret Nabeh Brandon, OOR, – Evangelism.
- Rod Claude Wilhelm Kundeyomi Ma-Johnson, OOR, 2014 – Information and Communication and the Independent Media Commission.
- Sister Teresa McKeon, OOR, 2017 – Irish missionary and educator.
- Victor Ajisafe, OOR, 2013 – Pastor. For contributions to religion.

=== Members ===
- Agnes Diminga Labor, MOR, 1990 – Services to the Republic of Sierra Leone.
- Alhaji Borbor Bah, MOR, 2013
- Alhaji Mohamed Malaisa Turay, MOR, 2014 – (Posthumously) Advancement of Islam.
- Alhaji Unis Yonka Sesay, MOR, 2014 – Advancement of Islam.
- Amadu Bangura, MOR, 2013
- Bai Sebora Kasanga II, MOR, 2013 – Paramount Chief
- Charles Mambu, MOR, 2013
- Crispin Feio Edwards, MOR, 2014 – Law profession.
- Denis Frank Kofi, MOR, 2018 – for services to the state.
- Donald Osman, MOR, 2013
- Dustana Remilcku Thompson, MOR, 2014 – Hotel Management.
- Fatou Yayah Kargbo, MOR, 2013
- Hawa Turay-Sesay, MOR, 2013
- Dr. Jeremiah Sinnah-Yovonie Kangova II, MOR, 2013 – (Posthumously) Paramount Chief Rev.
- John Admire Thomas, MOR, 2014 – Accountancy.
- Joseph Mamboh, MOR, 2018 – for services to the state.
- Major Sahr David Thomas, MOR, 2018 – for services as the Chief Instructor at the Peace Mission Training Centre.
- Miriam Mason-Sesay, MOR, 2013
- Mohamed Kallon, MOR, 2013 – Inter Milan footballer.
- Odette Awada, MOR, 2013
- Mohamed Sama Kailondo Banya, 2013, MOR – Paramount Chief.
- Patrick Daniel Koroma, MOR, 2008
- Peter Christian Andersen, MOR, 2014 – Communication.
- Prince Tungie W. Lightfood Taylor, MOR, 2014 – Economy.
- Reginald Woodruff Olujimi Beresford During, MOR, 2013
- Reverend Debora Y. Freeman, MOR, 2014 – Contributions to the state.
- Reverend Kathleen Gloria Adesimi Betts Cole, MOR, 2014 – Philanthropy.
- Reverend Michael Sumaila Samura, MOR, 2013
- Reverend Thomas Johnnard Barnett, MOR, 2014 – Evangelism.
- Sylvanus Eugene Chukwema Ronnie-Decker, MOR, 2013
- Tamba Songu Mbriwa, MOR, 2014 – (Posthumously) Paramount Chief. Local Government Administration.
- Theresa Fatu Kamara, MOR, 2014 – Department of Prisons.
- Thomas Conteh, MOR, 2013
- Thomas Tamba Kamara, MOR, 2014 – Police Force.
- Umaru Bangura, MOR, 2017 – Captain of the Leone Stars, Sierra Leone's national football team.
- Victor Lansana Koroma, MOR, 2013
- Yayah Kamara, MOR, 2014 – Department of Prisons.

=== Unspecified ===
- Gibril Sesay, 1986.
- James 'Jimmy B' Bangura, 2001 – music and film producer.

== See also ==
- Orders, decorations, and medals of Sierra Leone
- Order of the Republic
- Presidential Award

== References and sources ==
- Republic of Sierra Leone: Order of the Republic
