= Abubakarr Multi-Kamara =

Sierra Leonean Ambassador

Abubakarr Multi-Kamara GCOR is a Sierra Leonean civil servant and diplomat who served as Sierra Leonean Ambassador to China from 2012 to 2013.

He graduated from London South Bank University with a bachelor's degree in estate management, and with an MA in development economics University of East Anglia. Between August and September 2008, he was chairman of the committee on national security and peacebuilding. In 2013, he was nominated as the next Sierra Leonean Permanent Representative to the United Nations, but ultimately did not take up the position.

In April 2013, he was made a Grand Commander of the Order of the Rokel, the second order of Sierra Leone.
