= Reginald Eleady-Cole =

Reginald Haworth Eleady-Cole
- Reginald Eleady-Cole
- Born: 2 January 1929; Freetown, British Sierra Leone
- Died: 9 October 1997 (aged 68)
- Other name: Reggie Eleady-Cole
- Education: Prince of Wales Secondary School; Gonville and Caius College, University of Cambridge, University of Liverpool
- Occupations: Physician, Cardiologist
- Writing career
- Language: English, Krio
- Website: rhec.org.uk/biography/

Reginald Haworth Eleady-Cole MB ChB, DTM&H, FRCP Edin, GCOR (2 January 1929 – 9 October 1997) was a prominent Sierra Leonean doctor and philanthropist known for his medical achievements and his role as the personal physician of President Siaka Stevens and President Joseph Saidu Momoh.

Eleady-Cole was one of the first cardiologists in Sierra Leone. He established the intensive care unit at Connaught Hospital and completed ground-breaking research with Dr Robert A. Bruce.

== Background and early life ==
Reginald Haworth Eleady-Cole was born on 2 January 1929 in Maroon Town, Freetown, British Sierra Leone, to Sierra Leonean parents, George Eleady-Cole and Rebecca Nancy Eleady-Cole, née Rosenior.

His father, George, was a merchant and the son of a high-ranking civil servant. His mother, Rebecca, was from a prominent Sierra Leonean family of Nova Scotian Settler and Jamaican Maroon descent.

The Eleady-Cole family resided in the central district of Freetown, Sierra Leone, a prosperous area of the town with some of the leading families in the colony, and Reginald Eleady-Cole had a privileged upbringing.

== Education ==
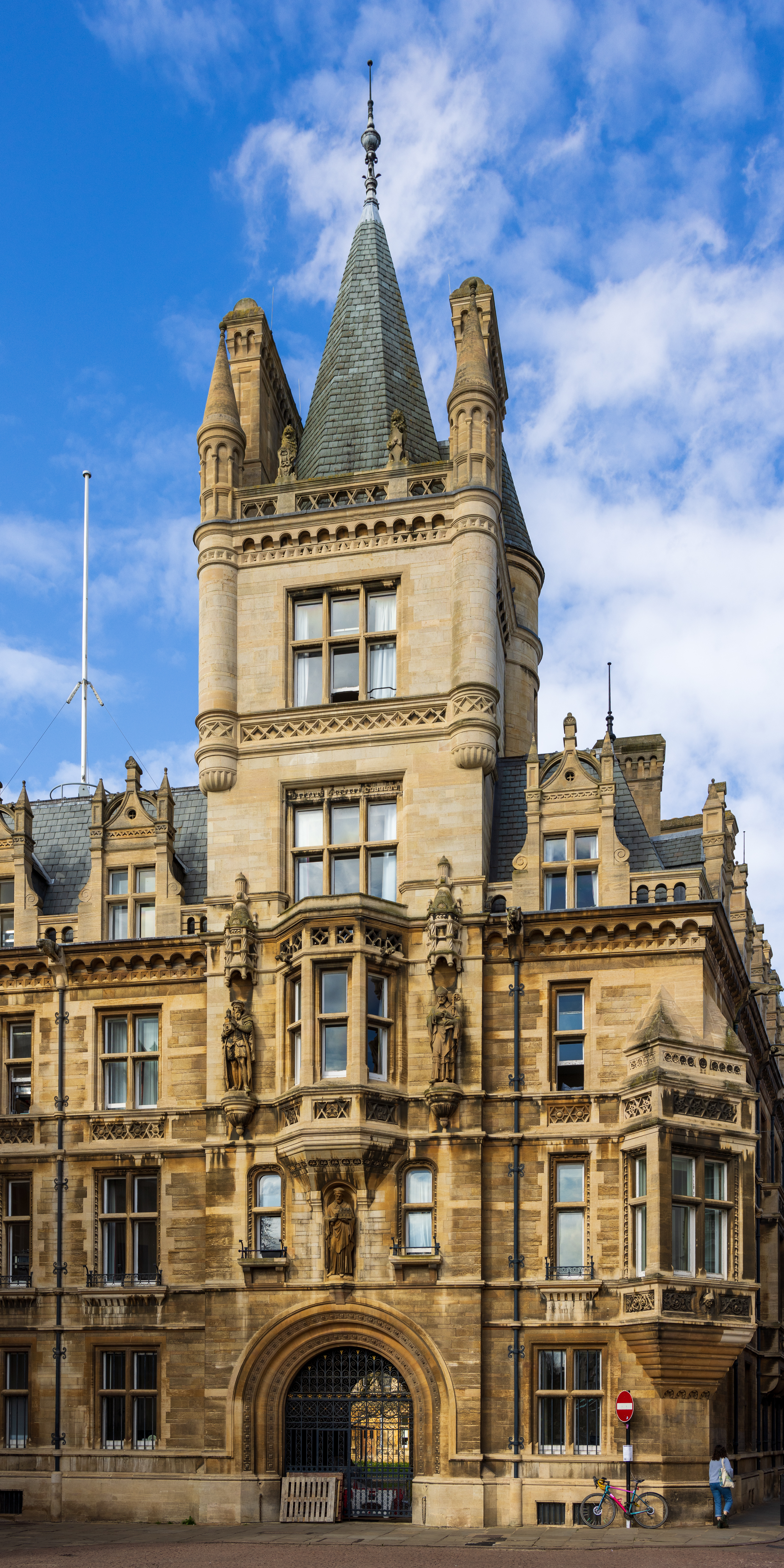
Gonville and Caius College, Cambridge

Reginald Eleady-Cole attended local primary schools in Freetown, Sierra Leone.

Eleady-Cole was educated at the Methodist Boys High School, where he was appointed as the head boy of the school.

He proceeded to the Prince of Wales School, Freetown, where he gained a foundation in the sciences. The school produced several medical doctors in Sierra Leone including Robert Wellesley-Cole and Raymond Sarif Easmon.

He received a government scholarship to study medicine in England at Gonville and Caius College, University of Cambridge where he obtained the MB ChB in 1961.

After completing his studies at Cambridge University, he subsequently received the DTM&H at the University of Liverpool in 1964.

Eleady-Cole collaborated with Dr Robert A. Bruce at the University of Washington between 1969 and 1970. He arrived back in Sierra Leone in 1970.

== Medical career ==
Eleady-Cole returned to Sierra Leone and as a government medical officer practiced in Bo, Sierra Leone. He returned to Freetown, Sierra Leone, where he practiced at Hill Station, Sierra Leone.

He was appointed as one of the physicians of Sir Milton Margai, the first prime minister of Sierra Leone before his death in 1965.

Eleady-Cole was a consultant cardiologist at Connaught Hospital and became a Senior Consultant. He established the Intensive Care Unit at Connaught Hospital Freetown. Eleady-Cole also brought the first kidney dialysis machine to Sierra Leone.

He was also the private physician of President Siaka Stevens and also of President Joseph Saidu Momoh.

He was a Fellow of the Royal College of Physicians of Edinburgh in 1970. He was also a founder member of the West African College of Physicians.

== Honours ==
He received the Order of the Republic of Sierra Leone for his contributions to medicine.

== Later years ==
Eleady-Cole died in London, England on 9 October 1997.
