= Asadata Dafora =

Sierra Leonean multidisciplinary musician (1890–1965)

- Born: Austin Dafora Horton; 4 August 1890; Freetown, British Sierra Leone
- Died: 4 March 1965 (aged 74) Harlem, New York City
- Genres: African drum music, dance music
- Occupations: Songwriter, producer, social activist
- Years active: 1929–1960

Austin Dafora Horton (4 August 1890 – 4 March 1965), also known as Asadata Dafora, was a Sierra Leonean multi-faceted artist talented in music, opera and concert singing, dancing, choreographing and composing.

He was one of the first Africans to introduce African drumming music to the United States, beginning in the early 1930s and, in 1934, created "Kykunkor (The Witch Woman)" a successful musical/drama production using authentic African music and dance and is considered one of the pioneers of black dance in America.

Dafora is best remembered for his work in dance and music.

== Early years ==
Austin Dafora Horton was born into the Creole ethnic group on 4 August 1890 in Freetown, British Sierra Leone. He was the son of John "Johnnie" William Horton, the Freetown city treasurer, and his wife, a concert pianist. Dafora grew up in a privileged household. Some doubt surrounds his family surname. Horton may have come from his great-grandfather, Moses Pindar Horton, a liberated African slave originally from Benin. Despite Dafora's own assertion in program notes for Kykunkor that his great-grandfather was a freed slave, dates indicate it was in fact Dafora's grandfather [Moses Pindar Horton] who experienced slavery and who was repatriated to Sierra Leone. His half sister was Constance Cummings-John, a well known Creole Pan-Africanist.

Born into a prominent family, Dafora received a European education at the Wesleyan School in Freetown. However, he always maintained a keen interest in the study of indigenous African culture, especially traditions and languages, and 17 distinct African languages. As a young man, Dafora travelled to Europe and studied at several opera houses in Italy to advance his musical training, learning English. French. Spanish. German and Italian. His crossover from choral music into the medium of dance happened purely by coincidence. He claimed that he went to a performance of West African songs in a German nightclub in 1910, and overwhelmed with homesickness, he broke out into traditional African dance. His performance was so well received that the club owner contracted him to train a group of dancers to celebrate the opening of the Kiel Canal. While touring with his dance troupe, Dafora was struck by how ignorant most people were about Africa and dedicated the rest of his career to exposing people to African culture.

== Dafora arrives in New York ==
In 1929, Asadata Dafora journeyed to New York City to try to pursue his career as a musician. He was then 39 years old.

Despite his talent, at the start of the Great Depression creative performing careers were difficult to maintain, particularly for foreign African performers. However, his interactions with a group of African men at the National African Union soon led him back to his interests in African dance. The company he formed was called Shogolo Oloba (sometimes known as the Federal Theater African Dance Troupe and Asadata Dafora Horton and his African Dancers) and it strove to portray African culture in a complex and sophisticated light, not just an exotic array of mysterious spectacles. Because he strove for authenticity in his work, Dafora preferred to use native African dancers and trained them in African languages as well as performance techniques. Dafora is credited with the development of the dance-drama, a type of production that fully integrates narrative and song into dance performance. Furthermore, Dafora was the first to successfully stage African ritual in a Western style stage production. His first work, "Kykunkor" (Witch Woman), completed in 1931, was based on African folklore. It opened in 1934 and was such an overwhelming success that it had to move to a larger theatre to accommodate the audiences.

He was also the choreographer and drummer in a 1936 stage success, Orson Welles's all-black Macbeth performed in Harlem, on Broadway and on national tour. With his collaborator, Abdul Assen, he helped create the unique sound and feel of the Haitian "voodoo" sections of the performance. He toured with his works "Awassa Astrige/Ostrich" (1932), "Zunguru" (1940) and "Batanga" (1941). He also co-authored a radio play with Orson Welles entitled "Trangama-Fanga". Around 1950, Dafora founded the Academy of Jazz. He has also been the subject of a film by Kinsley Mbadiwe called The Greater Tomorrow.

== Kykunkor ==
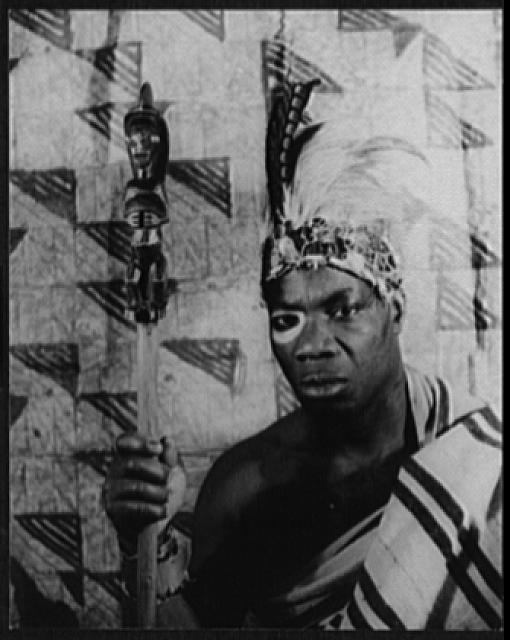
Turquese as Chief Burah in Kykonkor (1935) Photo by Carl Van Vechten

Kykunkor, or The Witch Woman, was produced at the Little Theater on West 44th Street, New York City. In 1934, a studio on East 23rd Street named the Unity Theatre allowed for the new opera to premier in early May. Dafora's musical/drama is the story of a bridegroom who is cursed by a witch doctor named Kykunkor, and of this groom's attempts to remove the curse.

The audience consisted of only sixty people, "but after John Martin's favorable review in the New York Times on 9 May, 425 people appeared that evening, 200 of whom had to be turned away because of an overflowing theatre." (Perhaps this is not accurate. The Little Theatre had 300 seats when it was built in 1912. By 1924, it had been expanded to seat 599) Because of Martin's influential review, the show moved to larger venues and continued to show for four months to packed audiences

The cast consisted of eighteen men and women, a mix of African and African-American performers. The show was colourful and exciting, with live music and continuous, stimulating drumming, and the audience was exposed to a "visual feast of 'semi-naked black men and women, posturing, writhing, crazily whirling, dancing insanely—vitally,'..." White American audience members looked upon the performance with preconceptions about the African culture, which to them was primitive. The dancers' motions were alluding to "nature, animals, and the basic functions of living—especially sex..." At a time when American concert dance was dominated by austerity and an overwhelming emphasis on the struggle of the individual heroine, such as with Martha Graham and Humphrey-Weidman pieces, Dafora's bright, lively and exotic show was a lively and appealing alternative. The masculinity of the male dancers and the developing interest of the African culture among white modern artists and intellectuals in the US and Europe also brought much attention to Kykunkor.

But Kykunkor was more than just an exciting piece, it was an innovation. Kykunkor was "the first opera presented in the United States with authentic African dances and music, performed in an African tongue by a mainly African-born cast". "Kykunkor proved that black dancers working with material from their own heritage could be successful on the American concert stage." However, at the same time it reinforced that black dancers could only be accepted into the concert dance scene if they danced within the "primitive" genres of dance; the American and European high-art concert dance was a place for white and European artists. The critic John Martin, while praising the dance, also stated that "'Negroes cannot be expected to do dances designed for another race.'" Asadata Dafora opened the field of concert dance to the black performers, but not until later in the century would Black American dancers begin to be recognised as serious and worthy performers in American concert dance.

== Other stage work ==
In 1939, Dafora appeared at the Ridgeway Theatre in White Plains, New York, as "Congo Witch Doctor" in Eugene O’Neill's play The Emperor Jones. The production starred Paul Robeson and cast some members of his African dance troupe, including Sakor Jar, Lamina Kor and Antiga.

== Return to Sierra Leone ==
In 1960, Asadata Dafora returned to Sierra Leone where he became the cultural director of the newly independent nation. His contributions to the dance world influenced many future artists, especially African-American artists such as Pearl Primus, Esther Rolle and Katherine Dunham.

== Death ==
Dafora died in hospital at Harlem, New York, on 4 March 1965.
