= Nemata Majeks-Walker =

Sierra Leonean women's rights activist

- Born: 1946 or 1947 (age 77–78); Freetown, Sierra Leone
- Education: Magburaka Secondary School for Girls; Annie Walsh Memorial School
- Alma mater: Fourah Bay College; University of Illinois at Urbana–Champaign; University of Surrey
- Occupation: Women's rights activist

Nemata Majeks-Walker (born 1946/1947) is a Sierra Leonean women's rights activist.

== Early life and education ==
Majeks-Walker was born to an Aku Mohammedan family in Freetown, the capital of Sierra Leone. She was an only child. Her mother died when she was only five years old. She was raised by her great-grandmother and other family members.

She was educated at the Methodist Girls' School, Magburaka Secondary School for Girls in Mathora, and Annie Walsh Memorial School in Freetown.

She won a government scholarship and earned a bachelor's degree in English Language and Literature from Fourah Bay College (FBC) in 1972. She trained as a teacher and earned a post-graduate Diploma in Education in 1973. She earned a master's degree in English as a Second Language at the University of Illinois at Urbana–Champaign in 1975.

== Academic career ==
Majeks-Walker returned to Freetown, lecturing at Fourah Bay College and AWMS, rising to co-head of the English Department in 1981, before working as a curriculum development officer for English at the Institute of Education in Freetown.

In 1983, she won awarded a Commonwealth Scholarship to pursue a PhD in distance education at the University of Surrey, in Guildford, England. She earned her PhD in 1986 and worked as an education officer in London until the early 1990s.

Since 1999, Majeks-Walker has been a "consultant and facilitator/trainer with work experience in gender, leadership, advocacy, and politics".

== Activism ==
In 2001, Majeks-Walker founded the 50/50 Group of Sierra Leone, focused on equality for women.

In July 2013, Majeks-Walker was a speaker at the World Justice Forum IV at The Hague, Netherlands.

In 2015, she was named by the BBC as one of their 100 Women.

In January 2017, Majeks-Walker was appointed as the chairperson of the Teaching Hospital Complex Administration board by Sierra Leonean members of parliament of the Appointment and Public Service Committee.

== See also ==
- Women in Sierra Leone
