= Order of the Republic (Sierra Leone) =

- Type: Order
- Awarded for: Valuable services to Sierra Leone.
- Country: Sierra Leone
- Presented by: The President of Sierra Leone
- Established: 1972

Precedence
- Next (lower): Order of the Rokel; Presidential Award

The Order of the Republic is the premier order of the state of Sierra Leone. It was established by President Siaka Stevens in 1972, to honour Sierra Leoneans and foreign nationals for distinguished and dedicated service to Sierra Leone.

Sierra Leonean awards, including the Order of the Republic, do not have post-nominal titles and, while there are no official abbreviations, the most common used unofficially are GCRSL (Grand Commander), CRSL (Commander) and GORSL (Grand Officer).

== Classes ==
The order originally had four classes, but currently comprises three:

- Grand Commander (GCRSL)
- Commander (CRSL)
- Grand Officer (GORSL)

== Insignia ==
The ribbon has three vertical stripes: green, white, and blue, representing the colours of the flag of Sierra Leone.

A ceremony to present insignia is undertaken annually by the President of Sierra Leone on Independence Day, 27 April.

== Notable recipients ==
- Dr Reginald Eleady-Cole (GCOR)
- Thomas Kahota Kargbo (GCOR), 2014
- Francis Minah (GCOR), 1981
- Ibrahim Rassin Bundu (CRSL), 2014
- Victor Bockarie Foh (CRSL), 2014
- Harold Hanciles J.P. (CRSL), 2014
- Phillipson Humaro Kamara (CRSL), 2014
- Samura Matthew Wilson Kamara (CRSL), 2014
- Bernadette Lahai (CRSL), 2014
- General Sir David Julian Richards (CRSL), 2014
- King Salman of Saudi Arabia (CRSL), 2017
- Michael von der Schulenburg (GCRSL), 2020
- Ajibola Emmanuel Manly Spain (CRSL), 2014

== See also ==
- Orders, decorations, and medals of Sierra Leone
- Order of the Rokel
- Presidential Award
