= Bernadette Lahai =

Sierra Leonean politician

Bernadette Lahai CRSL

Minority Leader of Parliament of Sierra Leone
- In office December 7, 2012 – present
- Preceded by: Emmanuel Tommy

Member of Parliament of Sierra Leone from Kenema District
- In office October 2007 – present

Personal details
- Born: December 30, 1960 (age 65) Yomboma, Kenema District, British Sierra Leone
- Party: Sierra Leone People's Party (SLPP)
- Education: Fourah Bay College: Njala University; University of Reading
- Profession: Agriculturist

Bernadette Lahai, CRSL (born December 30, 1960) is a Sierra Leonean politician and the current Minority Leader of Parliament of Sierra Leone. She is the leader of the main opposition Sierra Leone People's Party (SLPP) in the Sierra Leone House of Parliament. She currently represent Constituency 13 from Kenema District in the Sierra Leone House of Parliament.

In the 2002 general elections, Madam Lahai was elected to the Sierra Leone House of Parliament. She was re-election easily in the 2007 Parliamentary elections. She won another easy re-election in the 2012 Parliamentary elections, with 69.15%.

Lahai has a Bachelor of Arts in Geography and Sociology from Fourah Bay College, and a Master's Degree in Agricultural extension and Rural development from Njala University, both in Sierra Leone. Lahai also has a PhD in Agricultural extension and Rural development from the University of Reading in Berkshire, England.

Lahai is a native of Kenema District in Eastern Sierra Leone, and a member of the Mende ethnic group.

== Early life and education ==
Lahai was born on December 30, 1960, in the village of Yomboma in Lower Bambara Chiefdom, Kenema District in the Eastern Province of British Sierra Leone to Mende parents.

== Political career ==
In 2002, Lahai ran for one of Kenema District's seats in parliament as a member of the then ruling Sierra Leone People's Party (SLPP). She was elected, gaining over 60% of the vote in Kenema District. She again won re-election in the 2007 general elections.

=== 30% (Women and Politics in Sierra Leone) ===
In 2012, Lahai appeared in the short film 30% (Women and Politics in Sierra Leone) commissioned by Pathways for Women's Empowerment and Screen South. The film was made by Anna Cady and Jenny Cuff. It explores the unique challenges to gender equality in Sierra Leone, including corruption, violence and the foundational patriarchy of secret societies such as the Poro Society.

The film depicts Lahai and fellow women's rights activists Barbara Bangura and Salamatu Kamara and their work on a 30% Quota bill they were submitting to parliament.

30% (Women and Politics in Sierra Leone) was an Official Selection for the Sundance Film Festival 2013

In 2014, Lahai was recognized for her distinguished and dedicated service to the state in the fields of agriculture and politics by the President Ernest Bai Koroma who made her a Commander of the Order of the Republic (CRSL).
