= Constance Cummings-John =

Sierra Leonean women's rights activist, politician and teacher (1918–2000)

- Born: Constance Agatha Horton; 28 December 1918; Freetown, Sierra Leone
- Died: 21 February 2000 (aged 81); Freetown, Sierra Leone
- Education: Cornell University
- Occupations: Principal; Teacher; City councilor; Mayoress
- Spouse: Ethnan Cummings-John
- Children: Nestor Cummings-John, Coneth Cummings-John
- Relatives: Asadata Dafora (half-brother), Edna Elliott-Horton (sister-in-law)

Constance Cummings-John (1918 – 21 February 2000) was a Sierra Leonean educationist and politician. She was the first woman in Africa to join a municipal council and in 1966 became the first woman to serve as mayor of Freetown, Sierra Leone. She was based in London, England, for the latter part of her life.

== Biography ==
=== Early years and education; London and New York ===
She was born Constance Agatha Horton into an influential Creole family, black migrants to West Africa from the Americas in the 18th century who by the 20th century had become intellectuals, business people, and members of the professions. Her father, John William Horton (1861–1916), was city treasurer of Freetown, while her mother, Regina Horton, née Awoonor-Wilson, was a concert pianist.

Constance herself went to London in 1935, aged 17, to train as a schoolteacher. While there, she joined the West African Students' Union and the League of Coloured Peoples. Having gained her teaching certificate, she took up further studies in the United States at Cornell University.

When she returned to London she joined the International African Service Bureau, under the leadership of George Padmore, and married Ethnan Cummings-John, a radical lawyer. In 1937, she returned to Freetown as principal of the African Methodist Episcopal Girls' Industrial School, but her political activities caused her great problems with the British Colonial Office. During the Second World War she established a mining company, which later became an important source of funds for her educational projects.

Between 1946 and 1951, she lived in New York City, where her brother Asadata Dafora Horton was a successful musician and dancer. While living in the US, she worked in hospitals and served on the executives of the American Council for African Education and the Council on African Affairs, the second of which was chaired by Paul Robeson.

=== Return to Freetown ===
On her return to Freetown in 1951, Cummings joined the Sierra Leone People's Party. She helped found the Sierra Leone Women's Movement in 1951. She also founded a new school for girls, the Eleanor Roosevelt School, which by 1953 had more than 600 students. During these years, Cummings-John gained a licenciate from the London College of Preceptors, and in 1952 the Governor of Sierra Leone, Sir George Beresford-Stooke, appointed her to the Freetown Council. At the general election of 1957 she was one of two women elected to the new House of Representatives, even though women did not yet have the franchise. The Krio-led opposition then successfully demanded the resignation of both women, but the next year Cummings-John was elected to the Freetown Municipal Council.

In 1961, with the independence of Sierra Leone, Cummings-John's husband became the new country's ambassador to Liberia. In 1966, Prime Minister Albert Margai appointed her as Mayor of Freetown, in succession to Siaka Stevens, but she held the position for only a few months. Her party lost the general election of 1966, and there was then a successful military coup against the new government. Cummings-John was herself accused of financial corruption while outside the country and was advised not to return.

=== Political activity in London ===
She settled again in London, where she became an active member of the Labour Party and the Campaign for Nuclear Disarmament and also a school governor.

Cummings-John was a member of political organizations in the United Kingdom and the United States as well as in Sierra Leone, and she and I. T. A. Wallace-Johnson were the only Krio to fight for the participation of the indigenous "Protectorate peoples" in West African political processes. Her actions also led to the formation of the Sierra Leone Market Women's Union and a Washerwoman's Union.

Despite unsuccessful attempts to return to Sierra Leone in 1974 and 1996, Cummings-John lived the rest of her life in London. In 1995, she published an autobiography, Memoirs Of A Krio Leader. She died in London on 21 February 2000 at the age of 82.

== Publications ==
- Memoirs of a Krio Leader (Ibadan: Sam Bookman Educational, 1995).
