= Jenny Cuffe =

British journalist

Jenny Cuffe is a freelancer and BBC journalist.

== Education ==
She attended St Catherine's School, Bramley.

She studied English literature at Newnham College, Cambridge, before embarking upon a career as a print and radio journalist.

== Career ==
Jenny Cuffe joined the BBC in 1974 as a graduate trainee journalist. Her first position was at BBC Radio Solent. This followed a position in local print journalism with a year at the Surrey Advertiser.

She then worked on Woman's Hour, BBC2's Public Eye and Channel 4's Dispatches, as well as writing articles for The Independent and The Guardian before moving to the BBC Radio current affairs team in Manchester where she hosted the Seven Days series. She regularly produces reports for BBC File on 4, having joined it under the editorship of Helen Boaden. She also presented a three-part series in 2003 about social workers, The Pariah Profession, which received a Sony Silver award for Best News Programme of the Year in 2004.

She has interviewed prominent and often controversial public figures such as Vanessa Redgrave, Dr. Marietta Higgs and Dr. Helena Daly.

Her journalistic work has focussed on areas such as human rights, the rights of refugees, and the trajectory of education policy in stories such as the analysis of the Al Islah Girls' High School in Blackburn. Much of her work has focussed upon contemporary politics and social issues in various parts of Africa.

In 2010 and 2011 she carried out interviews with refugees to the British Isles who live in Southampton for the book This is my home now.

She has written for other publications such as Areté magazine.

== Academic study ==
Cuffee has studied as a post-graduate at the University of Southampton, pursuing an MA in Transnational Studies. In 2017 she was awarded a PhD by the university; her thesis title was "The Impact of Zimbabwe’s 'crisis' on three transnational families situated in Zimbabwe, South Africa and the United Kingdom".
