= Isata Dora Bangura =

Sierra Leonean educator and politician

Isata Dora Bangura is a Sierra Leonean educator and politician. She was the running mate of presidential candidate Charles Margai in Sierra Leone's 2018 general election. She is the second woman to run for the office of vice-president in Sierra Leonean history.

== Early life ==
Bangura is from north-east region of Sierra Leone.

She began her teaching career in 1976. In 2018, she left the teaching profession to run for political office.

== Political career ==
In 2006, Bangura joined the People's Movement for Democratic Change (PMDC) party which was formed as the result of a schism between Charles Margai and his supporters and the Sierra Leone People's Party. She distinguished herself as an advocate for women's issues.

== 2018 election ==
In 2018, she became the party nominee for vice-president of Sierra Leone and ran alongside presidential candidate Charles Margai in the general election.

The presidential campaign struggled to gain traction as many Sierra Leonean's resented Margai for supporting Ernest Bai Koroma and the All People's Congress in the 2012 general elections.

The PMDC won 0.4% of the vote and were unable to win any seats in parliament.
