= Priscilla Schwartz =

Sierra Leonean lawyer

Attorney General and Minister of Justice of Sierra Leone
- In office 11 June 2018 – 7 July 2020
- President: Julius Maada Bio
- Preceded by: Charles Margai
- Succeeded by: Anthony Yeihwoe Brewah

Special Assistant to the Attorney-General and Minister of Justice
- In office 1996–2006
- President: Ahmed Tejan Kabbah

Personal details
- Born: Priscilla Fofana; 18 March 1967 (age 59)
- Party: Sierra Leone People's Party
- Children: Natanela Lidia Schwartz and Sharon Rachael Schwartz
- Education: Fourah Bay College, (L.LB) and (BA) King's College London, (LLM) Queen Mary, University of London, (LL.D)
- Website: www.lawofficers.gov.sl

Priscilla Schwartz is a Sierra Leonean lawyer, the first woman to serve as Attorney General and Minister of Justice (2018–2020) in Sierra Leone.

== Early life and education ==
Schwartz was born Priscilla Fofana. She graduated from Fourah Bay College with a Bachelor of Arts and a Bachelor of Laws. She obtained a Master of Laws from King's College London and her juris doctor at Queen Mary, University of London.

== Career ==
=== Politics ===
On 11 June 2018 Schwartz became the first woman in the history of Sierra Leone to be appointed Attorney General and Minister of Justice. She was handpicked by President Julius Maada Bio to replace Charles Margai.

From 1996 to 2006, she was State Counsel and Special Assistant to the Attorney General and Minister of Justice in Sierra Leone. She advised on energy, telecommunications as well as petroleum and mineral mining. Schwartz played a key role in organizing the UN Special Court for Sierra Leone and Security Council visit.

=== Academia ===
Schwartz was a law professor at the University of Leicester from 2007 to 2012. From 2008 until 2011, she was a senior lecturer at her alma mater Queen Mary, University of London. She also lectured at the School of Oriental and African Studies, University of London from 2011 until 2013. Before her appointment as Attorney-General and Minister of Justice, she was a senior lecturer and the Director of the Energy and Natural Resources Law Programme, at the College of Professional Services, Royal Docks School of Business and Law, University of East London, United Kingdom from 2012 to 2018.

Schwartz's research is widely published in international business law and economic development journals.

=== Law ===
Schwartz is called to the bar in Sierra Leone. She is a barrister and solicitor at the Sierra Leone Supreme Court. Her specialities are energy law, natural resource law, international investment law, international finance law, international trade law, corporate governance, social responsibility and environmental law. She has advised governments and international companies operating in developing countries.

== Selected publications ==
- Energy Resources Financing (2018)
- Powe ring the Right to Development: Sustainable Energy in a Changing Climate (2016)
- Capitalism, International Investment Law and the Development Conundrum (2014)
- Public-Private Partnerships and Government Services in the least Developed Countries (2013)
- Trade and Development Partnerships (2010)
- Sustainable Energy Infrastructure: Law and Policy (2009)
- Sustainable Development and Mining in Sierra Leone (2006)
