= Barbara Bangura =

Sierra Leonean women's rights activist

Barbara Bangura (born 13 November 1958) is a Sierra Leonean women's rights activist. She is the National Co-Ordinator of the Women's Solidarity Support Group.

== Early life and education ==
Barbara Thaimu Bangura was born in Belfast, Northern Ireland on 13 November 1958.

== Career ==
She is a Sierra Leonean community organizer, non-violence trainer and peace activist.

== Gender Equality Draft Bill ==
In 2012, Bangura collaborated on the Gender Equality Draft Bill with Bernadette Lahai and Salamatu Kamara.
