= Sierra Leone Women's Movement =

The Sierra Leone Women's Movement (SLWM) was a Sierra Leonean women's organization founded by Constance Cummings-John in 1951 in collaboration with women leaders from Sierra Leone markets.

The SWLM was founded in the aftermath of a 1951 Freetown demonstration of ten thousand women protesting the high cost of living and proposed increases in market dues. The women, led by Mabel Dove Danquah and Hannah Benka-Coker, blamed Lebanese wholesalers for the rising food prices, and petitioned for women to be given a monopoly to buy palm oil and rice directly from the governmental agricultural station.

The Women's Movement campaigned on a mix of issues of importance to women, including trading rights and education, and lobbied for a farmers' bank. It published its own newspaper, set up a women traders' cooperative, and ran evening classes. Though several prominent women in the SLWM were Creole, the organization also included Temne women, such as Haja Sukainatu Bangura, who served as the SLWM's vice-chairperson.

In 1955 Milton Margai managed to win the SWLM's active support for the Sierra Leone People's Party. In 1960 the SLWM became a founder member of the Federation of Sierra Leone Women's Organizations.
