= Diana Finda Konomanyi =

Sierra Leonean politician

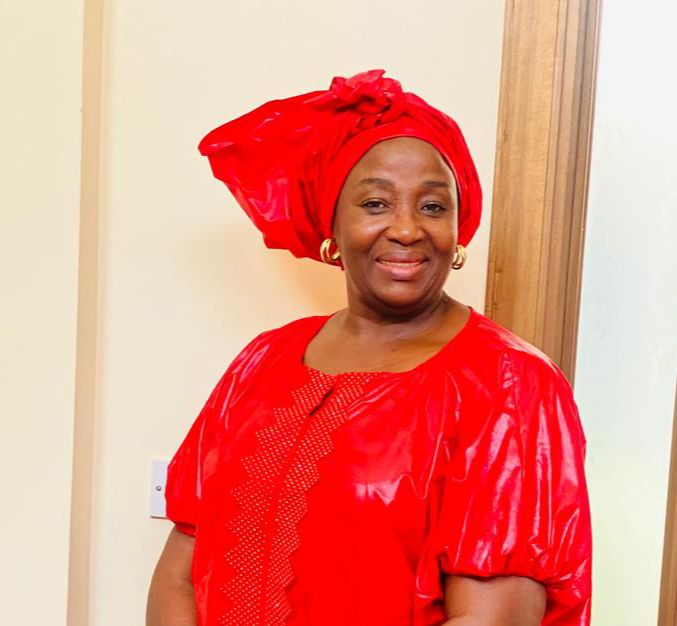

Former Sierra Leone Minister of Lands, Country Planning and the Environment
- Incumbent
- Assumed office 2015 -2018
- President: Ernest Bai Koroma

Former Sierra Leone Minister of Local Government and Rural Development
- In office 2012–2015
- Succeeded by: Maya Kaikai

District Council Chairperson of Kono District
- In office 2010–2012

All People's Congress Chairperson of the Eastern Province
- In office 2009–2010

Personal details
- Born: Koidu Town, Sierra Leone
- Party: All People's Congress (APC)
- Spouse: Alie Kabbah
- Education: King's College London

Diana Finda Konomanyi is a Sierra Leonean politician who has served as Minister of Lands, Country Planning and the Environment (2015 - 2018), Minister of Local Government and Rural Development (2012 -2015) in the erstwhile Government of President Ernest Bai Koroma. Prior to her ministerial appointment 'Iron Lady' (as she is fondly Called), was the Chairperson of the Kono District Council. (2008 -2012) after winning a landslide victory in a local government bye election in her home town of Kono District. Following the election of the All People's Congress (APC) and President Ernest Bai Koroma in 2007, Diana was appointed Board Chair of the Sierra Leone National Shipping Company

An active member of the APC party, Konomanyi was the Eastern Province chairperson of the All People's Congress (APC) for nearly two decades (2005 - 2022) and a champion of the party's victory in 2007 and 2012 general elections.

Born and raised in Koidu Town, Kono District, Diana Konomanyi is widely considered one of the most influential female politicians in Sierra Leone. She is a close ally of Sierra Leone's former president Ernest Bai Koroma and Dr. Samura Kamara the APC's presidential candidate for the 2018 general election.

== Political career ==
Diana Konomanyi was born into an APC Family. Her late father Fatoma Decius Konomanyi was a leading figure of the APC in the Eastern province, and was Mayor of the Koidu New Sembehun City Council and the master architect of Kono District, including the famous Konomanyi Park in Koidu town. Arguably, the most popular grassroots female politician in the APC party and across Sierra Leone, Diana Finda Konomanyi took her first steps into active politics in 1996, at a time when many were afraid to openly identify with the APC, following the NPRC Military Coup of 1992 and the intimidation of opposition politicians by the Sierra Leone People's Party (SLPP) regime that succeeded the NPRC.

Diana Konomanyi ran for a seat in the Sierra Leone Parliament in the 2007 general elections as the candidate of the All People's Congress (APC), but lost on a narrow margin to the incumbent parliamentarian Emmanuel Tommy of the Sierra Leone People's Party (SLPP)Pan-African News Wire: Sierra Leone Moves Toward Run-Off Elections.Not deterred by her loss, Diana was among the forebears of the APC, both in the eastern region and across Sierra Leone, and was among the very first to embrace the leadership of former President Ernest Bai Koroma in the early 2000s, in what was then considered a new wave of leadership in the APC. Madam Diana quickly became a pillar of hope and a foot soldier for the APC due to her steadfastness in promoting APC in unfamiliar territories, and her firm belief that an effective opposition is integral to democratic strengthening.

Before entering politics, Konomanyi worked as an entrepreneur and philanthropist. When she first showed an interest in politics, she was advised to continue with her businesses, which included working as a hotelier and restaurateur, providing contract services, and diamond and gold mining. Konomanyi viewed politics as a platform to advocate for gender equality in Sierra Leone. In 1996, during a period of decline for the APC, Konomanyi, then a business leader and post-war property reconstruction contractor, traveled from Kono to the North, Northwest, and Western Area to gather support for the party. Through this party activism, she founded the Northern Alliance, which established a base in the Koakoyima and Sewafe chiefdoms in the Kono district.

During the 2007 general elections, when she was popularly considered as a potential running mate to President Ernest Bai Koroma, Madam Diana Konomanyi put forward a brother and Kono indigene. For Madam Konomanyi, although she'd made strides in attaining equality for women in Sierra Leone, the time was not then right for her to be on the ticket, and putting the interest of her party, the APC, and the nation above her own, she actively enabled a team that would come to win the elections and guarantee immense development under President Ernest Bai Koroma and the APC in the following decade.

Madam Konomanyi is a popular grassroots politician. With the mentorship and support of the 2007 Presidential Standard Bearer of the APC, Ernest Bai Koroma, Madam Konomanyi has achieved several gender firsts in Sierra Leone politics:

- 2005 The first Female Regional Chairperson of the APC
- 2011 The First Female District Council Chairperson
- 2012 The First Female Minister of Local Government and Rural Development. A ministry previously thought to have been the exclusive domain of men and at which she's widely credited to have been the most efficient occupier to date.
- 2015 The First Female Minister of Lands, Country Planning and the Environment

== Personal life ==
Diana is the first child of her father Fatoma Decius Konomanyi, with several siblings whom she helped raised as the eldest child of her father. She is a mother to one beautiful daughter, Zaianab Daine Ghandour and two beautiful grandchildren. Apart from these, she is a mother to several others, and aunty, a cousin and social counsellor.

On August 18, 2013 Diana Finda Konomanyi celebrated her wedding to Alie Kabbah, an ethnic Mandingo, and a Sierra Leonean human right activist based in the United States, in a traditional and Islamic wedding ceremony in Koidu town attended my many senior Sierra Leonean government officials. In her quest for further education, Diana completed a Master's Degree in International Affairs (MIA) from King's College London and also attended the London College of Fashion in Tottenham London.
