= National Congress of Sierra Leone Women =

Sierra Leonean women's organization

The National Congress of Sierra Leone Women (NCSLW) was a Sierra Leonean women's organization, the women's wing of the All People's Congress (APC).

The NCSLW was founded in 1960. Its leader was Nancy Steele. The organization was fully integrated into the APC and did not cooperate with other women's groups. In 1970 it had 35,000 members.
