= Nancy Steele =

Sierra Leonean politician and labour activist (1923–2001)

Nancy Dolly Victoria Steele (1923–2001), was a Sierra Leonean politician and labour activist. Steele was a member of the APC political party in Sierra Leone.

== Early life ==
Nancy Dolly Victoria Grant was born in 1923 in Freetown, Sierra Leone to working-class Sierra Leone Creole parents.

== Political career ==
Steele was leader of the National Congress of Sierra Leone Women (NCSLW), founded in 1960 as the women's wing of the All People's Congress (APC). She served as a member of the Sierra Leone Parliament and was also acting Mayor of the Freetown City Council.

== Personal life ==
Nancy Steele was married to Marcus Steele, an Afro-Caribbean trade unionist. The couple had a son who died in infancy.

== Death ==
Steele died in 2001 in Freetown, Sierra Leone.
