= Methodist High School =

Methodist High School may refer to:

- Methodist High School, Kanpur, India
- Methodist Boys' High School, Lagos, Nigeria
- Methodist Boys' High School, Oron, Nigeria
- Methodist Boys' High School (Sierra Leone)
- Methodist Girls' High School (Lagos), Nigeria
- Methodist Girls' High School (Mamfe), Ghana
- Methodist Girls' High School, Point Pedro, Sri Lanka
- Methodist Girls High School (Port Harcourt), Nigeria
- Methodist Girls' High School (Sierra Leone)

== See also ==
- Christian Methodist Senior High School, New Aplaku, Ghana
- St. Matthew United Methodist High School, Liberia
- Methodist Girls' School (disambiguation)
