= MLC =

MLC may refer to:

== Companies and organizations ==
- MLC Limited, an Australian financial services company
- Major League Cricket, American Twenty20 professional cricket league
- Marine Logistics Command
- Maritime Labour Convention
- Mauritius Labour Congress
- Meat and Livestock Commission
- Mechanical Licensing Collective
- Midwest Lacrosse Conference
- Monarchist League of Canada
- Mono Lake Committee, an environmental organization in Lee Vining, California
- Motors Liquidation Company, the former General Motors
- Movement for the Liberation of the Congo, a political party
- Myanmar Language Commission

== Schools ==
- MLC School, New South Wales, Australia
- Martin Luther College in New Ulm, Minnesota
- Methodist Ladies' College (disambiguation)
- Metropolitan Learning Center (Bloomfield, Connecticut), a 6-12 school
- Metropolitan Learning Center (Portland, Oregon), a K-12 school
- Midland Lutheran College
- Minnesota Life College

== Science ==
- Megalencephalic leukoencephalopathy with subcortical cysts
- Mixed leukocyte culture, an immunological assay
- Multileaf collimator, a tool used for shaping radiation beams in external-beam radiotherapy
- Myosin light chain, a subunit of myosin
- Machine Learning Classifier, a type of artificial intelligence

== Other ==
- Legislative Council of the Isle of Man
- 25 Martin Place, building Sydney, Australia formerly named the MLC Centre
- MLC conjecture, on the local connectivity of the Mandelbrot set
- Maharashtra Legislative Council
- Member of the Legislative Council
- Member of the Legislative Council (India)
- Mercados Libres Campesinos
- Military Load Classification, e.g. MLC 75, MLC 85
- Motor landing craft, a British WWII landing craft
- Multi-level cell, a type of flash memory
- Multi-level converter, method of generating high-voltage wave-forms
- MLC Building
- Major League Cricket
