= Methodist Girls' School =

Methodist Girls' School may refer to:

- Methodist Girls' School, Ipoh, Malaysia
- Methodist Girls' School, Singapore
- Methodist Girls' High School (Lagos), Nigeria
- Methodist Girls' High School (Mamfe), Akuapim North District, Ghana
- Methodist Girls' High School, Point Pedro, Sri Lanka
- Methodist Girls High School (Port Harcourt), Rivers State, Nigeria
- Methodist Girls' High School (Sierra Leone)
- Methodist Girls' High School, Bathurst (now Banjul), Gambia, now Gambia Senior Secondary School

== See also ==
- Methodist High School (disambiguation)
- Methodist Ladies' College (disambiguation)
