= MLC Building =

MLC Building may refer to:

- MLC Building, North Sydney (1957), by Bates, Smart, McCutcheon
- MLC Building, Sydney (1938), on Martin Place by Bates, Smart, McCutcheon
- 25 Martin Place (1977), on Martin Place by Harry Seidler named the MLC Centre until 2021
- MLC Tower (1998), in Wan Chai, Hong Kong, by Andrew Lee King Fun & Associates
- Mutual Life & Citizens Assurance Company Building (1940), in Wellington, New Zealand, by Mitchell and Mitchell
- MLC Building, Auckland (1956), on Queen Street, Auckland, New Zealand, by Mitchell & Mitchell

== See also ==
- MLC Limited, the Australian insurance company responsible for the construction of all of the above
- MLC (disambiguation)
