= Plum Financial Services =

Plum Super
- Industry: Financial services
- Founded: 1998
- Founder: MLC; Vanguard Australia
- Headquarters: Melbourne, Australia
- Services: Superannuation & Pensions
- Number of employees: Over 160
- Parent: Insignia Financial
- Website: www.plum.com.au

Plum Super is an Australian corporate superannuation administrator and provider of financial products and services, before Plum Super became a product of MLC in 2016. As of 2021, Plum Super is administered by MLC Wealth Management Services.

Plum administers over A$20 billion in funds under management on behalf of more than 80 medium and large Australian organisations and more than 230,000 members. Plum was purpose-built for the era of member investment choice.

Plum has offices in Melbourne and Sydney. Originally a joint venture between MLC and Vanguard Australia, it later became a wholly owned part of the National Australia Bank.

In 2016, Plum Super was absorbed into the broader wealth management division of National Australia Bank, ceasing to exist as a separate business. Plum's superannuation & Pension products continued to operate within NAB Wealth, and now continue within the IOOF since its 2021 acquisition of NAB's wealth business.
