= High Society (Canberra) =

High-rise residential complex in Canberra, Australia

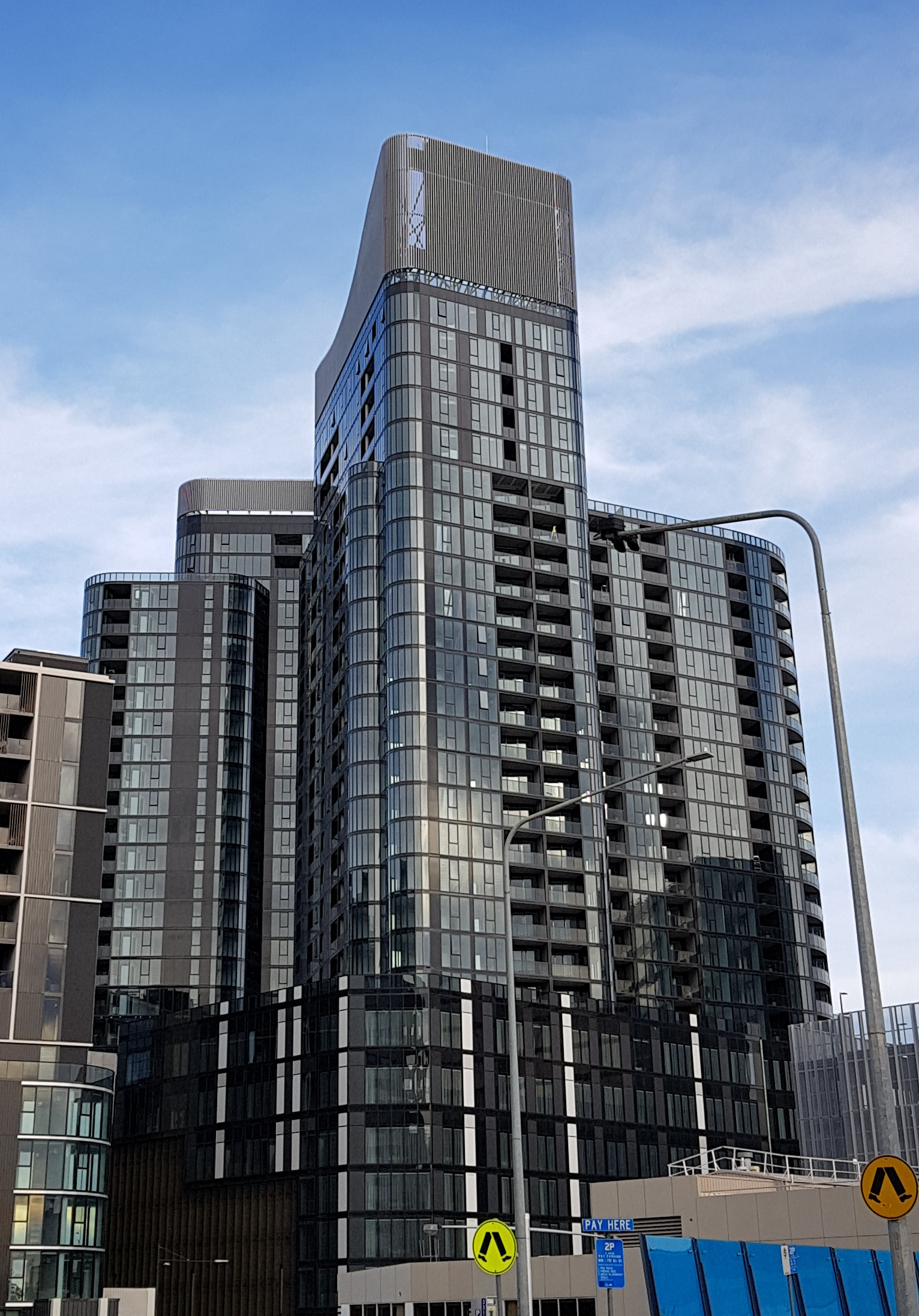
- High Society in 2020

General information
- Type: Residential
- Location: Belconnen, Australian Capital Territory
- Coordinates: 35°14′26.23″S 149°04′18.99″E
- Construction started: 2018
- Completed: 2020
- Owner: Geocon

Height
- Height: 113 m and 100 m

Technical details
- Floor count: 27

Design and construction
- Architecture firm: Fender Katsalidis Architects, Geocon
- Structural engineer: Hera Engineering

High Society is a high-rise residential complex in Belconnen, Canberra, Australia. Completed in 2020, the complex consists of two 27-storey towers which are the tallest and second-tallest buildings in Canberra, standing at 113 m and 100 m.

== History and design ==
Developer Geocon bought the site in 2015 and, following development approval in 2018, oversaw construction of the two High Society towers, which were completed in 2020. Both towers are 27 floors tall, but differ in height by 13 m because the taller tower has floor-to-floor heights of 3.4 m from floor 23 upward, whereas all lower levels — and the entirety of the shorter tower — have floor-to-floor heights of 2.9 m. The initial design included a public observation deck, though this feature was scrapped in favour of penthouses.

Upon topping-out, the towers became the tallest buildings in Canberra at 113 m and 100 m, surpassing the 93-metre-tall Lovett Tower in the Woden Town Centre, which had held the title since its completion in 1973.

Whilst the taller High Society tower is Canberra's tallest building, it is not the city's tallest structure, as Telstra Tower (195.2 m) and a guyed mast (Gungahlin MF, 192 m) surpass it in height.

High Society forms part of the Republic Precinct developed by Geocon for the Belconnen Town Centre, which consists of several projects by the developer: Republic, Dusk, High Society, and Nightfall.
