= Fritz Bach =

American transplant physician

Fritz Heinz Bach
- Born: 5 April 1934; Vienna, Austria
- Died: 14 August 2011 (aged 77); Manchester-by-the-Sea, Massachusetts
- Citizenship: American; Austrian
- Education: Harvard College; Harvard Medical School
- Known for: Mixed lymphocyte reaction
- Awards: 1998 Medawar Prize of the Transplantation Society honorary Dr.rer.nat/PhD from University of Vienna Royal Netherlands Academy of Arts and Sciences
- Scientific career
- Fields: Transplantation Immunology
- Workplaces: University of Wisconsin; University of Minnesota; Harvard Medical School

Fritz Heinz Bach (5 April 1934 – 14 August 2011) was an Austrian-born American transplant physician and immunobiologist. He was considered one of the pioneers in the field of transplant immunology.

Being born in a Jewish family in Vienna, Bach fled Nazism at an early age. He was moved to England in the Kindertransport, and later with his family made the journey overseas to the United States. He obtained a scholarship to study at Harvard and continued his studies until graduating in 1960. Soon afterwards, Bach made his first contributions to the field of transplant immunology. One of his main achievements was the development of the mixed lymphocyte culture (MLC) test, which furthered research on preventing transplant rejection. Bach spent the main part of his career at University of Wisconsin–Madison, University of Minnesota and Harvard Medical School. He retired in 2006.

== Early life ==
Bach was born on 5 April 1934 to Leo Bach and Gertrude Rosenfeld in a Jewish family in Vienna, Austria. Shortly after the events of the Kristallnacht of early November 1938, Bach and his older brother Bertholdt fled Nazi Germany to England with British help in the Kindertransport. After arriving the brothers were put in the care of a British family. The parents reunited with their sons in Bath, England. With help of an American soldier the family emigrated to Burlington, Vermont in 1949. Bach's maternal grandparents died in Nazi death camps after having stayed in Vienna during the war.

Bach went to Burlington High School and subsequently started studying physical science on a scholarship at Harvard University where he graduated in 1955. He continued his studies in medicine at Washington University in St. Louis and Harvard Medical School and obtained a degree in medicine at the latter in 1960. During this latter period he became interested in genetics and immunobiology.

For his residency training Bach started working at New York University. Here Bach became acquainted with Lewis Thomas, who would become the inspiration for Bach's career. In 1961 Thomas pushed Bach to attend a lecture on the antigens and mechanisms involved in allograft rejection which was given by Peter Medawar at New York University, the lecture convinced Bach to study the topic further.

== Career ==
In 1965 Bach started working at the University of Wisconsin. During his time at the university, which would last until 1980, Bach progressed from instructor to assistant professor, associate professor and lastly full professor. From 1974 to 1980 was Director of the Immunobiology Research Center at the university.

Bach's major contribution to transplant science was the invention of a technique to mix cells from donor material to cells from the patient. The process allowed for a better insight in which transplant material could be successfully transplanted to the patient without fear of transplant rejection. The mixed lymphocyte culture (MLC) test as it was called, was an important step in transplant science. It was based on study of changing cell structures in vitro cultures of peripheral blood lymphocytes of unrelated individuals. Bach worked further on the possibilities of MLC with Kurt Hirschhorn in the 1960s.

In 1968 his technique led to the first successful operation with use of a bone marrow transplant by Robert A. Good. Later that year Bach led an operation himself. By 1975 Bach had improved his technique so that the test would not take days anymore, but hours. This led to the possibility to use organs and other transplant material from the recently deceased. Bach's work on transplant compatibility helped in later experiments that identified the major histocompatibility complex.

In 1979 Bach moved to the University of Minnesota, where he would work until 1992. During his time at Minnesota Bach developed in an interest in xenotransplantation, and with others, he looked into the possibilities of transplant rejection within xenotransplantation. In 1992 he moved to the Department of Surgery of the New England Deaconess Hospital and Harvard Medical School to become head of the Sandoz Center for Immunobiology. At Harvard Medical School Bach held the Lewis Thomas chair of surgery since 1995. The chair had been named after his inspiration. As head of the Sandoz Center amongst others researched the possibilities to use carbon monoxide to protect organs. In the later part of his career Bach was also concerned with the possible use of transplant tissue and organs from pigs on humans, foreseeing possible problems with new diseases, not yet known for humans. In 1998, he was one of several scientists who called for a moratorium until a decision could be made on the topic by a public commission. At Harvard Bach also did research on the role of bilirubin, carbon monoxide and heme oxygenase in tolerance induction and graft survival.

Bach retired in 2006. Overall, he contributed to around 800 scientific papers during his career.

== Awards and honors ==
Bach became a foreign member of the Royal Netherlands Academy of Arts and Sciences in 1987. In 1998 he was the winner of the Medawar Prize of The Transplantation Society.

At the end of his career Bach was awarded an honorary doctorate by the University of Vienna in 2004. His Austrian citizenship was also restored in this period.

== Personal life ==
Bach was married twice and had six children. Two of his sons became physicians. With his first wife Bach also collaborated during his career. He died on 14 August 2011, aged 77, from a cardiac arrest in his home in Manchester-by-the-Sea, Massachusetts.
