= Lovett Tower =

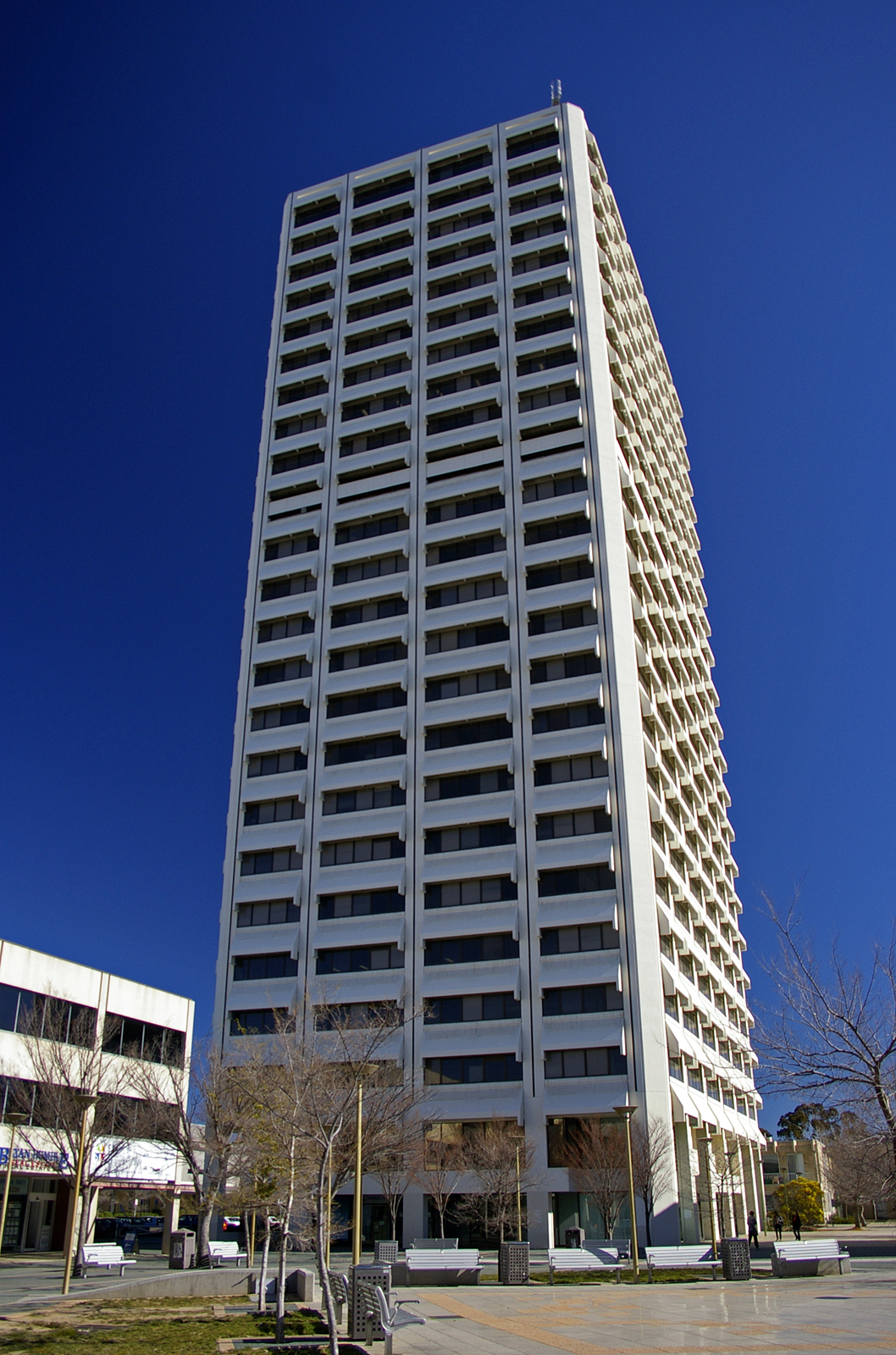
- Lovett Tower
- Former names: MLC Tower
- Etymology: Lovett Family

General information
- Type: Office
- Architectural style: Modern
- Location: Canberra, Australian Capital Territory, Australia, 13 Keltie Street
- Coordinates: 35°20′42.0″S 149°05′06.2″E
- Completed: 1973
- Owner: Hunter Investment Corporation - www.hez.com.au

Height
- Architectural: 93 metres (305 ft)
- Tip: 93 metres (305 ft)
- Roof: 82 metres (269 ft)

Technical details
- Floor count: 26
- Floor area: 24,000~sqm NLA

Design and construction
- Architects: Jon Mitchell and Associates. Sydney.
- Main contractor: Civil & Civic

The Lovett Tower (formerly known as the MLC Building) is a 93-metre-tall building (305 ft) located in the Woden Town Centre, a commercial district in Canberra. The building is a Canberra icon and remains the tallest commercial building in Canberra offering vast 360˚ views across Woden valley.

Lovett Tower is centrally located within the Woden Town Centre, one of Canberra's busiest satellite retail, commercial & residential centres.

Westfield Woden, one of Canberra's largest shopping destinations, is positioned directly opposite Lovett Tower, to the south and southeast.

== History ==
Its construction was completed in 1973 by Civil & Civic, and it became the tallest building in Canberra. This title was replaced by the High Society development in Belconnen which was completed in 2020, although still retains the highest occupiable floor.

In 1994 the building was bought by E.C. Managed Investments Group and then sold on to BZW Investment Management Group for A$47.5 million. In 2006 Lovett Tower was then purchased by Cromwell Property Group for A$73 million. In 2020 the building was bought from Cromwell Property Group by Brite Developments Pty Limited. In 2022, Lovett Tower was purchased by Hunter Investment Corporation; also owner of the Hunter Economic Zone - Australia’s largest Industrial Estate and Business Park at 3,200 hectares, and one of the largest business estates in the Asia Pacific region.

The Lovett Tower is a landmark commercial office building, refurbished in 1999, 2007, 2016, 2022, and can be seen towering over the city. It was formerly known as the MLC Tower but was renamed in 2000 by the Aboriginal and Torres Strait Islander Commission to honour the Lovett family.

== Commonwealth History ==
Throughout its life, Lovett Tower has been the reliable home of numerous Commonwealth government tenants. These include the:

- Department of Veterans Affairs,

- Department of Environment,

- Department of the Prime Minister & Cabinet,

- Department of Aboriginal Affairs,

- Department of Education & Youth Affairs,

- Office of ACT Further Education,

- Commonwealth Schools Commission

== Features ==
The Lovett Tower was previously the 3rd tallest structure in Canberra (behind Black Mountain Tower and the flagpole of Parliament House) and before 2020, was the tallest building in the city.

The Tower was previously occupied by the Department of Veterans' Affairs, the Department of the Environment and the Department of the Prime Minister and Cabinet until 2018. The building is now undergoing a complete refurbishment to enhance its A grade offering and present best in class ESG credentials.

Accommodation of the building consists of a single level basement, ground floor foyer, two ground floor tenancies, a mezzanine & 22 continuous office levels. Upper levels of the building feature a central service core which accommodates female and male amenities, tea rooms, and multiple lifts and lift lobbies.

The building features a highly efficient design that maximises office flow through two separate lift foyers for low-rise & high-rise levels, that provide access to the building from 8 separate high-speed lifts.

== Revolutionary Design ==
The building was wholly planned by the National Capital Development Commission (NCDC).

Rather than assigning an architect, MLC held a competition won by Jon Mitchell & Associates, of Sydney, who designed the building with an all-white facade required to blend with other buildings in the centre.

The design was among the first to feature a groundbreaking central core concept, maximizing window space and enhancing exposure to natural light. The inclusion of fixed concrete panel sunshades mitigated the impact of sunlight on the skyscraper, enhancing its energy efficiency by an estimated 15% through passively reducing the demand on air conditioning systems.

== Gallery ==
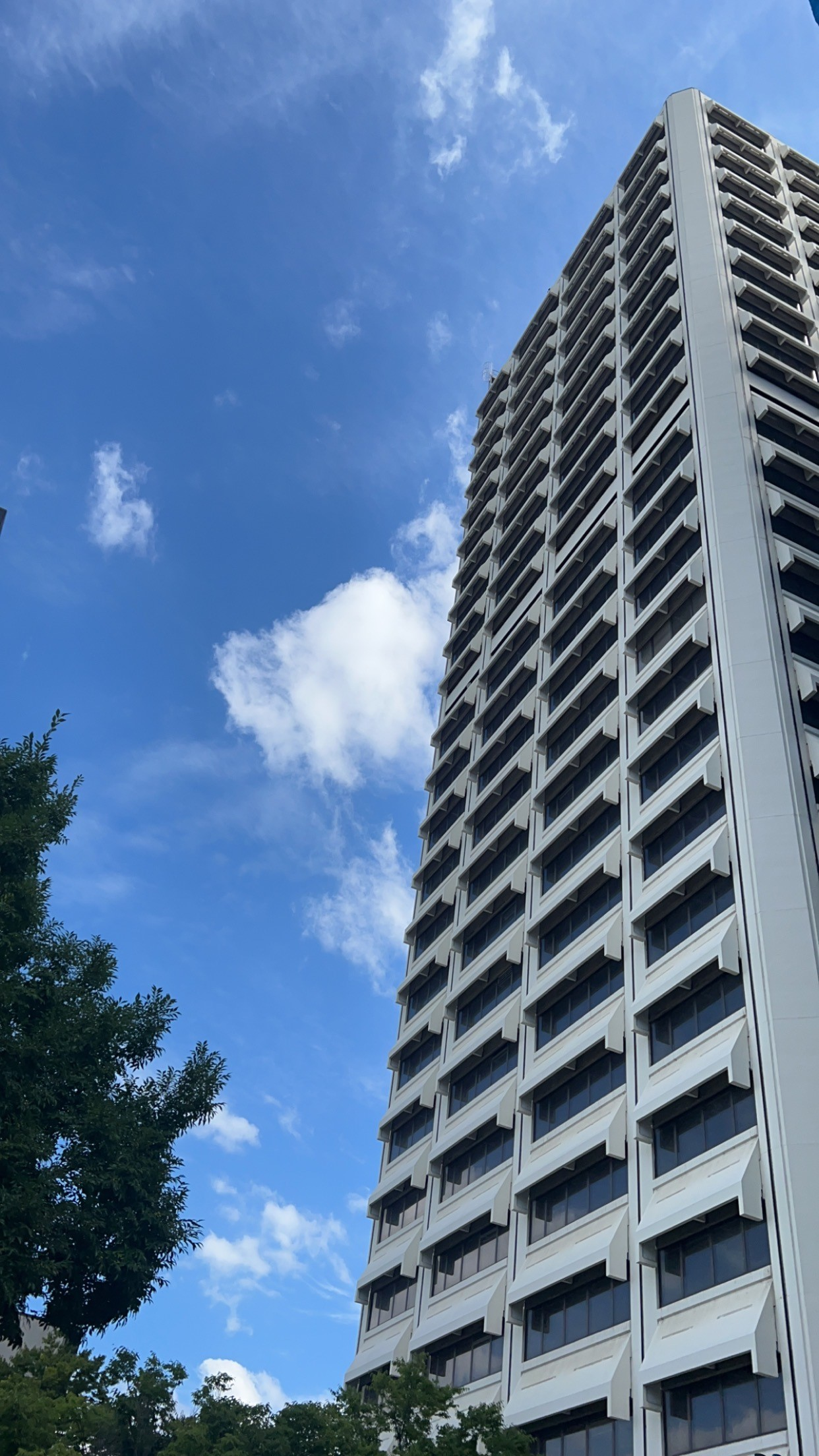
Lovett Tower Skyline

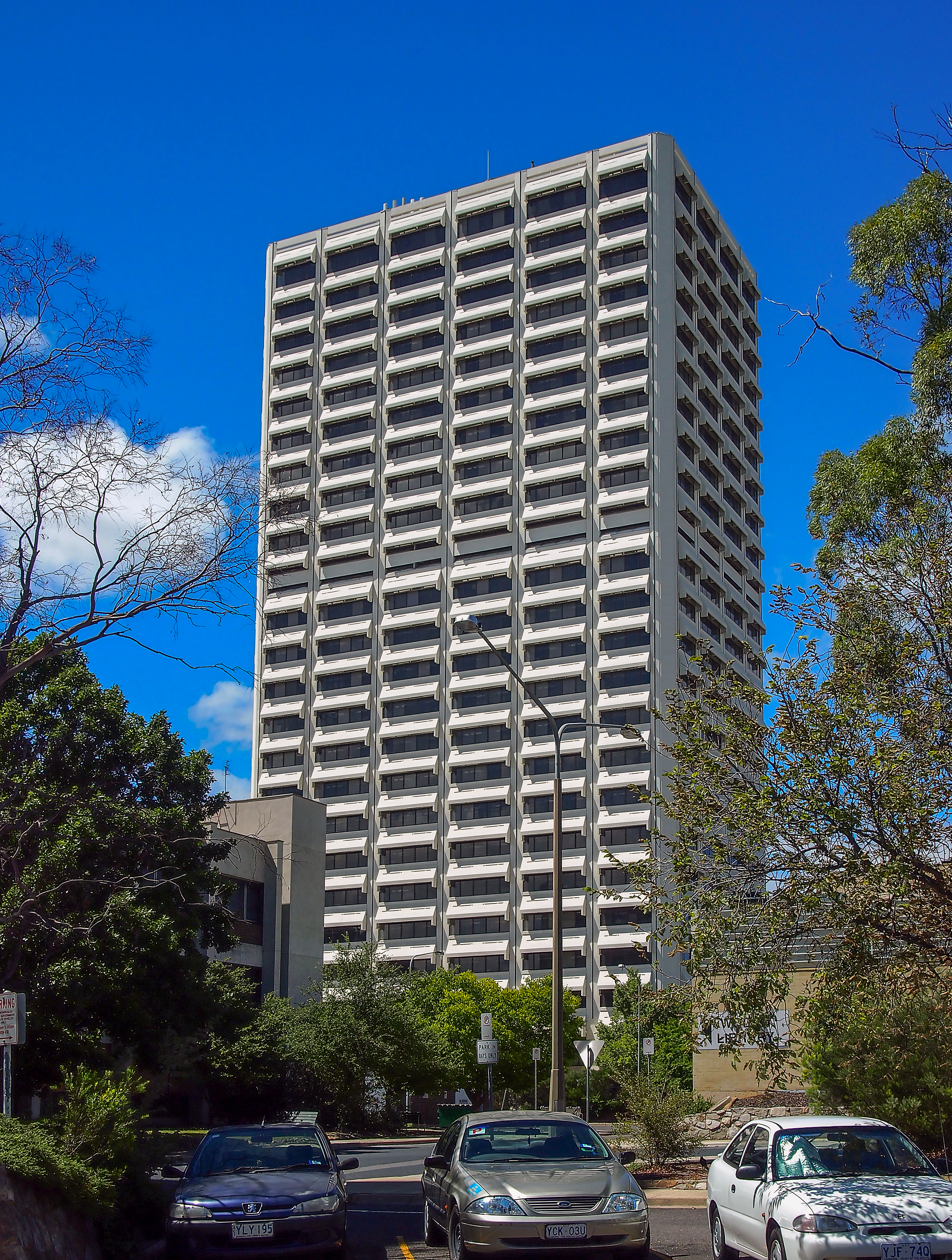
Viewed from the north

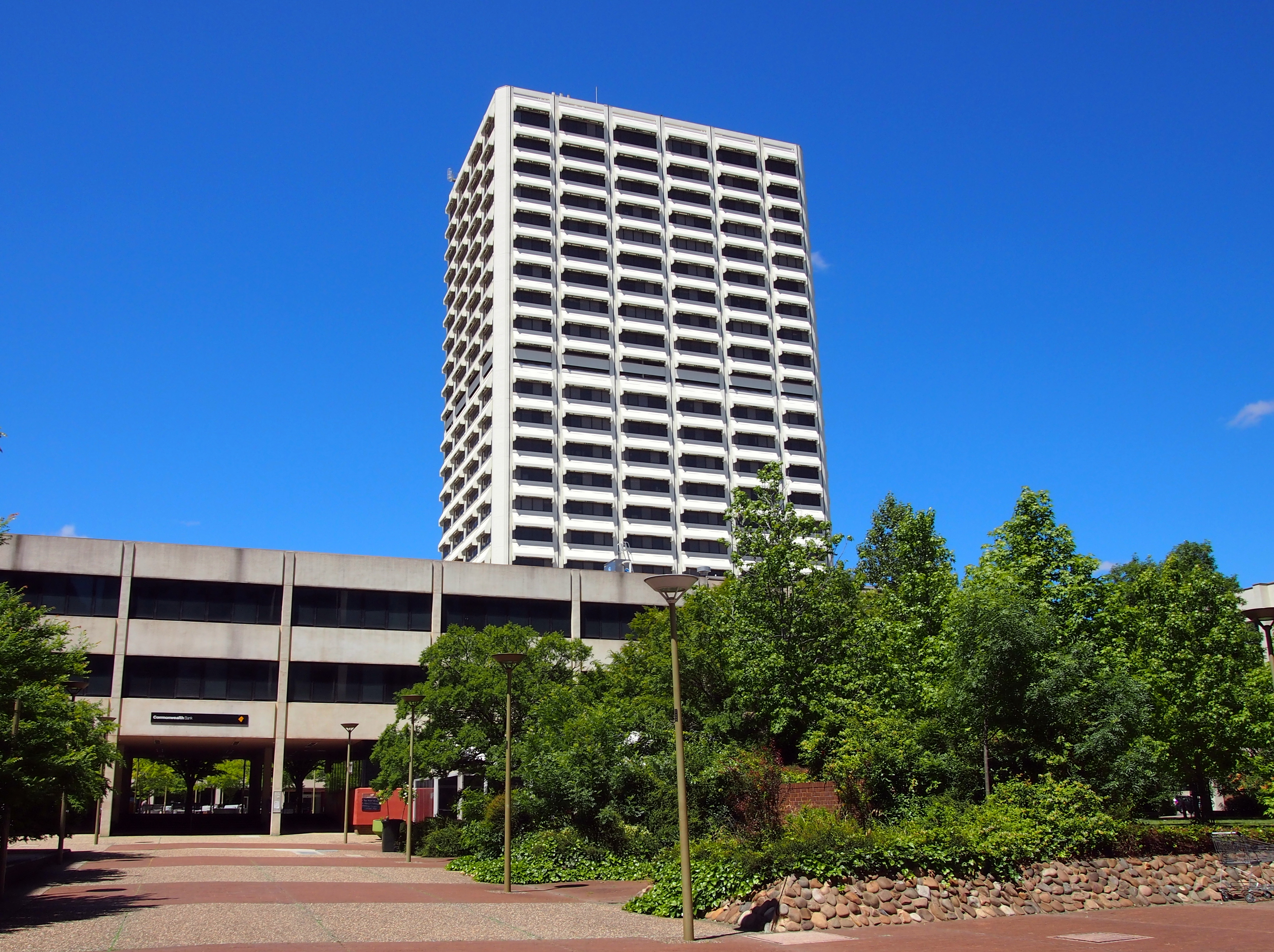
Northern face of the tower

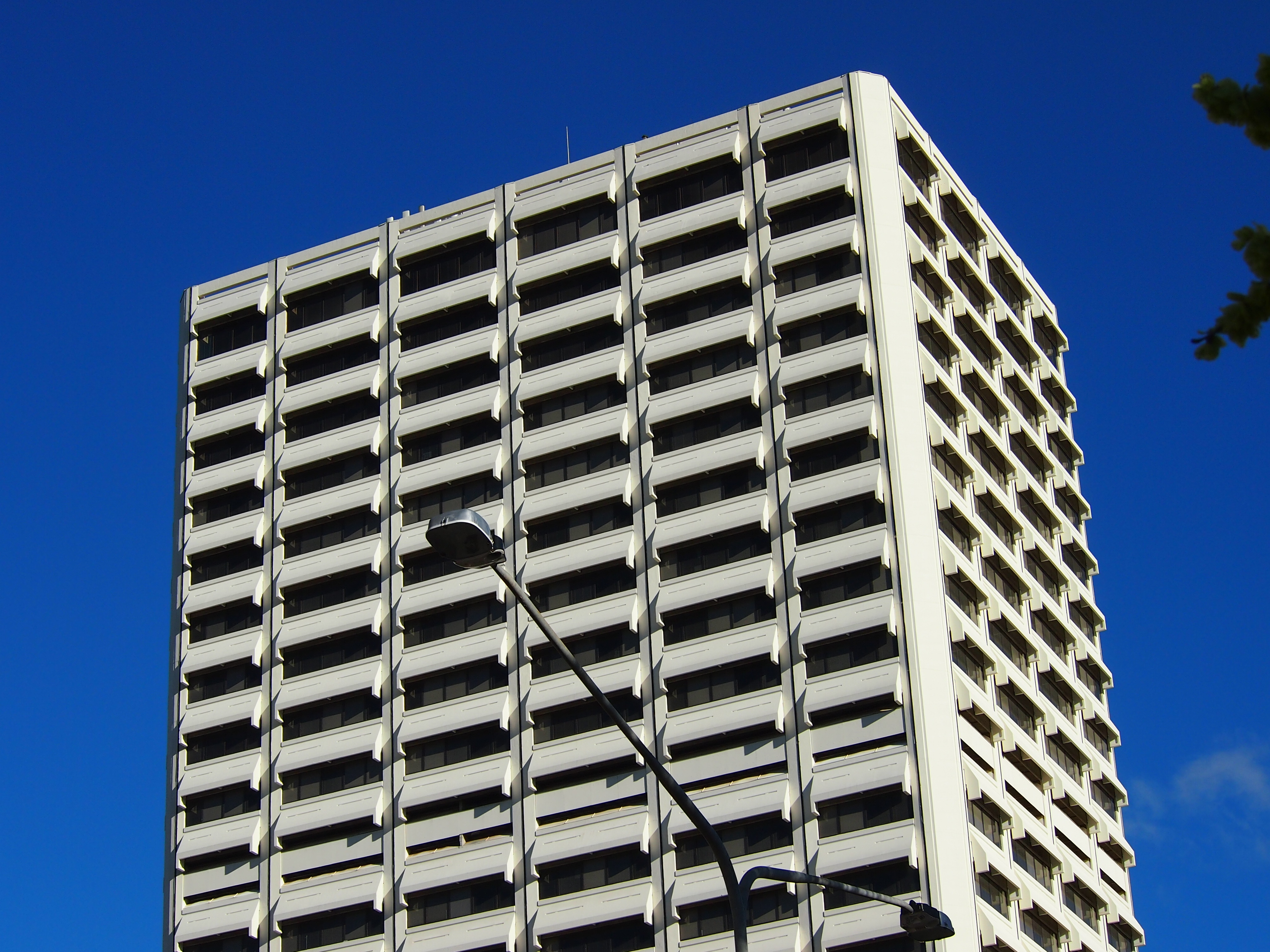
Upper floors of the tower

== See also ==
- List of tallest buildings in Canberra
