= IOOF (disambiguation) =

IOOF is the Independent Order of Odd Fellows, a fraternal order founded in 1819 in Baltimore, U.S., by Thomas Wildey

IOOF may also refer to:

- Insignia Financial, Australian financial services company that previously traded as IOOF
- IOOF Building (disambiguation), a number of buildings
