= List of tallest buildings in Canberra =

Tall buildings in Canberra
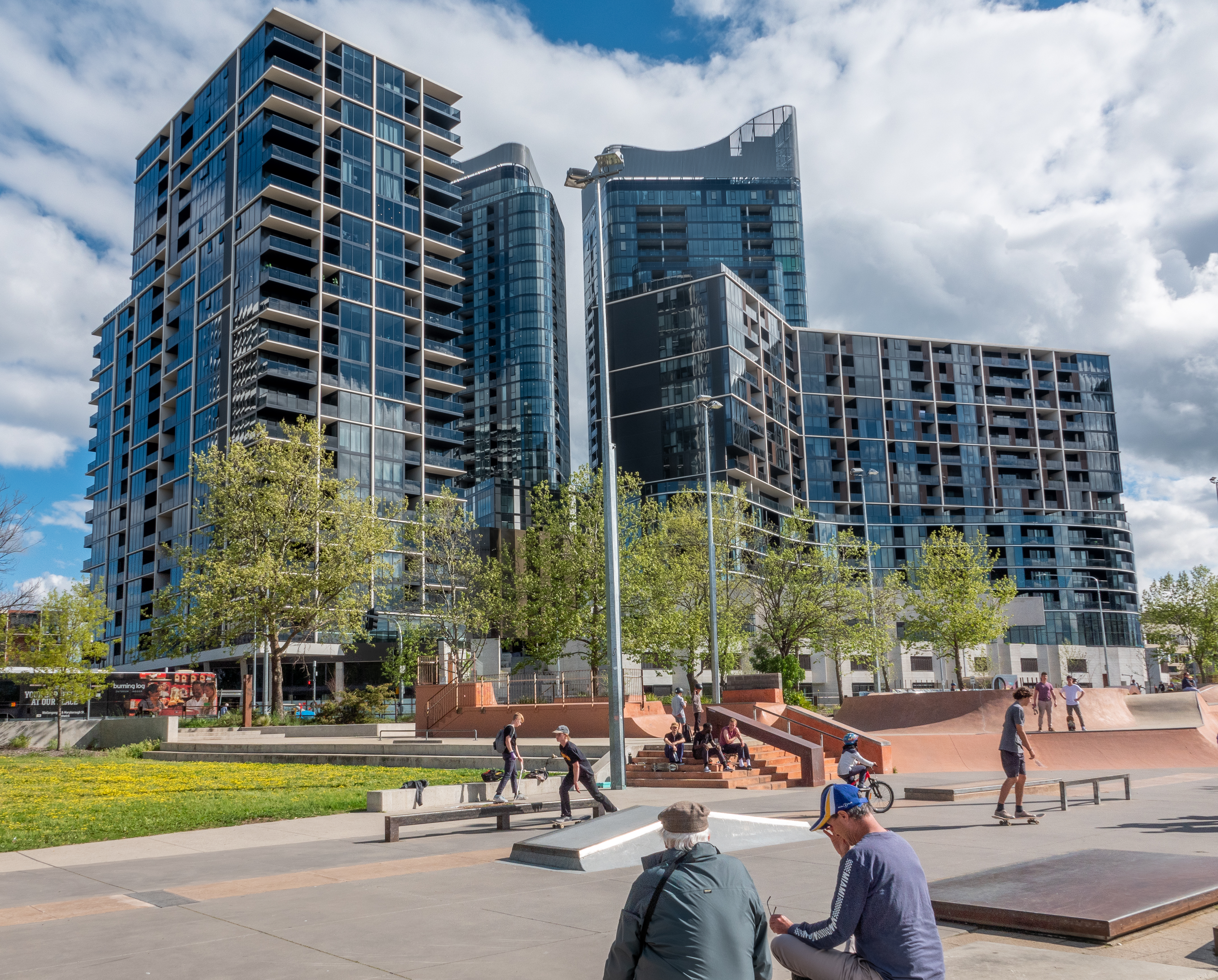
- High Society Towers in Belconnen, the tallest buildings in Canberra
- Tallest building: High Society Tower 1 (2020)
- Tallest building height: 113 m (371 ft)

Number of tall buildings
- Taller than 50 m (164 ft): 53 (2026)
- Taller than 100 m (328 ft): 2 (2026)

This list of tallest buildings in Canberra ranks the tallest in Australia's capital city by height. This ranking system was created by the US-based Council on Tall Buildings and Urban Habitat and includes the height to a spire but not to an antenna. The High Society towers at 113 metres (371 ft) and 100 metres (330 ft) respectively, with 27 storeys, are the tallest in Canberra, and are in Belconnen, a north-western district of the city.

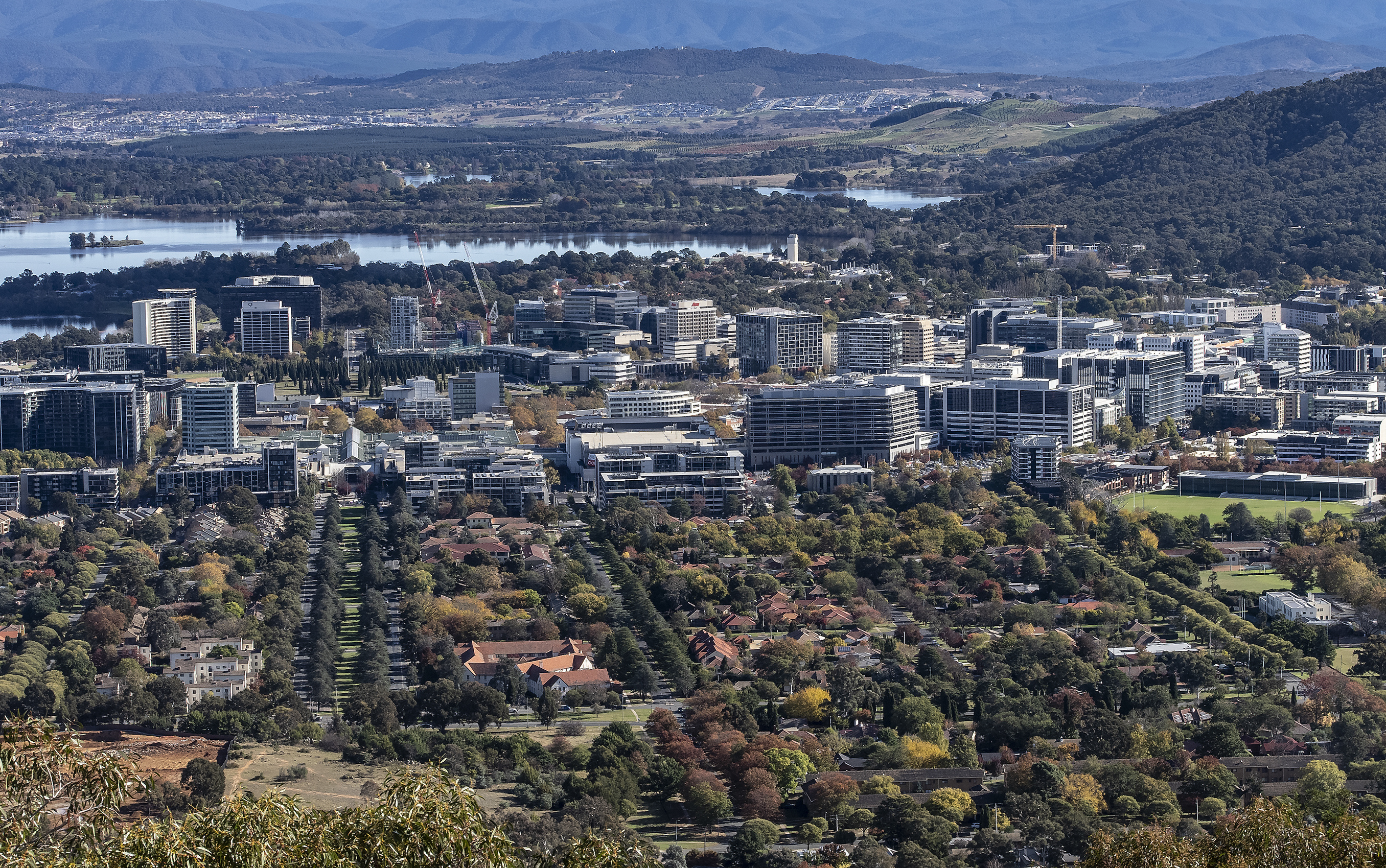
Canberra city centre - Civic is home to many high rise office buildings

There is a height limit in Canberra Central of 617 metres (2,024 ft) above sea level, generally about 50 metres (160 ft) above ground level in Canberra City, in compliance with the RL617 rule in the National Capital Authority's National Capital Plan. As a result, the highest buildings are now found in the outer town centres, such as Phillip and Belconnen. RL2025 feet (or RL617 metres) was recommended as the limit in a 1972 study because it was the equal height of the two tallest buildings at the time: the AMP Building and the tallest building at Russell Offices (Note: The eastern 10 story block of the Defence Headquarters building group in Russell.)

== Tallest buildings ==
These are the high-rise buildings of Canberra. There are taller structures in Canberra, including Telstra Tower at 195 m (640 ft), Gungahlin MF (a guyed mast located between Kaleen and Mitchell) at 192 m (630 ft), and previously, Parliament House (including the flagpole) at 107 m (351 ft).

Was Canberra's tallest building when completed

Name		Image	Height	Floors	Built	Purpose	Location
1	High Society Tower 1		113 m (371 ft)	27	2020	Residential	Belconnen
2	High Society Tower 2		100 m (328 ft)	27	2020	Residential	Belconnen
3	Lovett Tower		93 m (305 ft)	25	1973	Office	Phillip
4	Wayfarer Apartments		88 m (289 ft)	27	2016	Residential	Belconnen
5	Grand Central Towers		85 m (278.8 ft)	26	2020	Residential	Phillip
6	Cirrus Tower 1		85 m (279 ft)	24	2021	Residential	Belconnen
7	W2		79 m (estimate)	24	2024	Residential	Phillip
8	WOVA Tower 1		77 m (253 ft)	24	2024	Residential	Phillip
9	Nightfall		73 m (240 ft)	23	2022	Residential	Belconnen
10	Infinity Towers 1		70 m (230 ft)	22	2018	Residential	Gungahlin
11	Altitude Apartments		68 m (223 ft)	21	2013	Residential	Belconnen
12	Dusk (Republic)		68 m (223 ft)	22	2020	Residential	Belconnen
13	Ruby 1		67 m (220 ft)	18	2019	Residential	Gungahlin
14	Grand Central Towers 2		67 m (220 ft)	16	2020	Residential	Phillip
15	Infinity Towers 2		64 m (210 ft)	20	2018	Residential	Gungahlin
16	Sentinel Apartments		62 m (203 ft)	20	2013	Residential	Belconnen
17	Cirrus Tower 2		62 m (203 ft)	18	2021	Residential	Belconnen
18	The Shard		47-62 m (estimate)	16	2026	Mixed use	Phillip
19	Scarborough House		61 m (200 ft)	15	1975	Office	Phillip
20	Pacific International (Capital Tower)		60 m (197 ft)	20	1996	Residential	Civic
21	SkyPlaza		60 m (197 ft)	20	2005	Residential	Phillip
22	The ApARTments		60 m (197 ft)	18	2010	Residential	Civic
23	Mayfair Apartments		59 m (194 ft)	16	2016	Residential	Civic
24	Ivy Woden		59 m (194 ft)	16	2020	Residential	Phillip
25	Republic		59 m (194 ft)	16	2020	Residential	Belconnen
26	London Tower (The Metropolitan)		58 m (190 ft)	19	2006	Residential	Civic
27	Ernst & Young, 121 Marcus Clarke St		58 m (190 ft)	12	2008	Office	Civic
28	Oaks Woden		58 m (190 ft)	16	2021	Residential	Phillip
29	Sirius Building		57 m (187 ft)	10	2010	Office	Phillip
30	The Carrington		56 m (184 ft)	15	1987	Residential	Kingston
31	Highgate		56 m (184 ft)	18	2018	Residential	Civic
32	Kingston Tower		56 m (184 ft)	15	1985	Residential	Kingston
33	New Acton Nishi Apartments		55 m (180 ft)	17	2013	Residential	Civic
34	QT Canberra		55 m (180 ft)	18	1972	Hotel	Civic
35	SAP House		55 m (180 ft)	15	1989	Office	Civic
36	Woden Green		55 m (estimate)	17	2025	Residential	Phillip
37	Manhattan on the Park		54 m (177 ft)	16	2013	Residential	Civic
38	Park Avenue		54 m (177 ft)	18	2020	Residential	Civic
39	Capital Apartments		54 m (177 ft)	15	1992	Residential	Civic
40	Customs House		53 m (174 ft)	12	2014	Office	Civic
41	18 Marcus Clarke Street		52 m (171 ft)	12	2007	Office	Civic
42	15 London Circuit		52 m (171 ft)	14	1971	Office	Civic
43	Labor Club		52 m (171 ft)	14	2019	Commercial	Belconnen
44	Jade		52 m (171 ft)	14	2019	Residential	Gungahlin
45	Ruby 2		52 m (171 ft)	14	2019	Residential	Gungahlin
46	50 Marcus Clarke Street		51 m (167 ft)	11	2010	Office	Civic
47	ACTEW House, 221 London Circuit		50 m (164 ft)	12	1968	Office	Civic
48	Canberra Hospital	119x119	50 m (164 ft)	11	1973	Hospital	Garran
49	Canberra House		50 m (164 ft)	13	1974	Office	Civic
50	Meriton Hotel		50 m (164 ft)	16	2023	Hotel	Civic
51	CFM Building / Avaya House (12 & 14 Moore St)		50 m (164 ft)	14	1986	Office	Civic
52	Industry House		50 m (164 ft)	14	2006	Office	Civic
53	Constitution Place		50 m (164 ft)	12	2021	Mixed use	Civic
54	National Capital Centre		48 m (157 ft)	13	1992	Office	Civic
55	355/325 Anketell St (Southport)		48 m (157 ft)	13	2017	Residential	Greenway
56	AMP Building		47 m (154 ft)	13	1964	Office	Civic
57	The Establishment		47 m (154 ft)	18	2023	Residential	Gungahlin
58	Accolade on Moore		47 m (estimate)	16	2023	Student residential	Civic
59	Metropol		47 m (154 ft)	13	2021	Residential	Reid
60	The Metropolitan Tower 2		46 m (151 ft)	15	2006	Residential	Civic
61	Julianna Building		45 m (148 ft)	12	1973	Office	Phillip
62	Section 84		45 m (148 ft)	11	2006	Office	Civic
63	St George Centre, 60 Marcus Clarke		45 m (148 ft)	13	1988	Office	Civic
64	Nishi Building		44 m (144 ft)	12	2013	Office	Civic
65	Woden Trilogy		44 m (144 ft)	12	2017	Residential	Phillip
66	311 Anketell St (Southquay)		44 m (144 ft)	12	2017	Residential	Greenway
67	Barrandi Centre		40 m (131 ft)	10	2009	Office	Civic
68	5 Farrell Place		40 m (131 ft)	9	2007	Office	Civic
69	High Court of Australia		40 m (131 ft)	9	1980	Court	Parkes
70	MLC Building		38 m (125 ft)	9	1959	Office	Civic
71	T&G Building		35 m (115 ft)	9	1963	Office	Civic
72	Hobart Place Office Tower		35 m (115 ft)	9	1962	Office	Civic

== Tallest under construction or approved ==
This is a list of approved or under construction buildings in Canberra.

Key:
Topped out	Under construction	Approved

Name	Height	Storeys	Purpose	Completion	Location	Status
Belconnen Center	< 66 m	19	Residential	2028	Belconnen	Approved
The Charlotte		20	Residential	2026	Phillip	Topped out
The Melrose building four		18	Residential	TBA	Phillip	Under construction

== Timeline of tallest buildings ==
This lists buildings that once held the title of "tallest building in Canberra".

Name		Image	Year	Height	Floors	Notes
1	St John the Baptist Church		1878 – 1959	29.8m		Established 1841, spire added 1878.
2	Currong Flats		1959 – 1962	32m	8	Height based likely on estimates. Demolished July 2016.
3	Hobart Place Office Tower		1962 – 1963	35m	9	
4	MLC Building		1963 – 1964	38m	9	Built in 1959 and extended in height 1963.
5	AMP Building		1964 – 1968	47m	13	
6	ACTEW House		1968 – 1971	50m	12	
7	15 London Circuit		1971 – 1972	52m	14	
8	QT Canberra		1972 – 1973	55m	18	
9	Lovett Tower		1973 – 2020	93m	25	
10	High Society Tower 1		2020 – present	113m	27	

== See also ==
- List of tallest buildings in Australia
- List of tallest buildings in Oceania
