= St. Matthew United Methodist High School =

School in Liberia

Information
- Religious affiliation: The United Methodist Church in Liberia
- Established: 1969; 57 years ago

St. Matthew United Methodist High School is a high school in Liberia. It was founded in 1969 by The United Methodist Church in Liberia.
