= Methodist Ladies' College =

Methodist Ladies' College (or M.L.C.) is the name of several independent girls' schools affiliated with the Uniting Church or the Methodist Church.

- Methodist Ladies' College, Melbourne, Kew, Victoria
- Methodist Ladies' College, Perth, Claremont, Western Australia

== Schools formerly called Methodist Ladies' College ==
- Annesley College, Adelaide, South Australia
- Penrhos College, Perth, Western Australia
- MLC School, Burwood, (Sydney), New South Wales

== Schools formed by merging with a Methodist Ladies' College ==
- Scotch Oakburn College, Tasmania (Amalgamation of Methodist Ladies' College, Oakburn College and Scotch College)
- Cato College (formerly Methodist Ladies' College, Elsternwick, Victoria), integrated into Wesley College, Melbourne over the period 1986–1989

== See also ==
- Methodist Girls' School (disambiguation)
- MLC (disambiguation)
