= Methodist Boys' High School (Sierra Leone) =

Secondary school in Freetown, Sierra Leone

The Methodist Boys' High School, was founded as the Wesleyan Boys' High School, is a secondary school founded in Freetown, Sierra Leone, by the May family under the auspices of the Wesleyan Society on 6 April 1874. The school is affiliated to the Methodist Girls' High School (Sierra Leone) established by James Taylor, the uncle of Samuel Coleridge-Taylor under the auspices of the Wesleyan Society on 1 January 1880.

== Sources ==
- http://mbhsalumniassociationtx.org/school.html
