= The United Methodist Church in Liberia =

The United Methodist Church in Liberia is a member of the United Methodist Church, one of the world’s largest denominations. It is part of the Wesleyan Tradition, a methodical faith and practice started by John Wesley, whose father was a priest in the Anglican Church in England. The church today is found in almost all parts of the world including Europe, Asia, USA, and Africa. Liberia in Africa, is one of the many African countries where the United Methodist Church is established.

== History ==
The United Methodist Church in Liberia started in 1821. It was started by free blacks and formerly enslaved persons who had returned to Africa from the United States of America. Among its early members was Joseph Jenkins Roberts, who served as the first president of Liberia. It was organized as the Annual Conference of the United Methodist Church based in the Liberia Area. An Annual Conference is a primary unit through which the church Is established in a certain area. It is the denominational representation of the church where all power and voice can be found. Thus, the Liberia Annual Conference, United Methodist Church came into existence one hundred and eighty one years ago and can count on a long experience of faithful service to the Liberian people.

== Composition ==
The Liberia Annual Conference, the United Methodist Church consist of 20 Districts. A District is smaller than an Annual Conference and contain anywhere from 10 to 40 churches depending on where it is situated. Thus, the 20 Districts that make up the Liberia Annual Conference can be found geographically all parts of Liberia with concentration in west, central and south-eastern Liberia. In total, the Liberia Annual Conference has about five hundred local churches that make up the conference.

== Districts of the Liberia Annual Conference ==
The 20 Districts of the Annual Conference include:

- Monrovia District
- St. Paul River District
- Kakata- Farminton River District
- Weala District
- St. John River District
- Grand Bassa District
- Rivercess District
- Gbarnga District
- Jorquelleh District
- Lofa River District
- Gompa District
- Cape Palmas District
- Garraway District
- Kru Coast District
- Nana Kru District
- Barrabo District
- Sinoe District
- Morweh District
- Tappita District
- Kokoyah District

== Ministries of the Liberia Annual Conference ==
The Liberia Annual Conference, United Methodist Church operates from a central office from which the work of the church is coordinated all across Liberia. There are about twenty five different ministries or departments through which the church reaches out to God’s people. They are as follows:

- Agriculture
- Judith Craig Children Village
- Christian Education Department
- Communications Department
- Conference Course of Study Department
- Youth and Young Adults Department
- Women Ministries
- Men Ministries
- Children Ministries
- Evangelism Department
- Health and Welfare Department
- Education and General Ministries Department
- Board of Laity
- Operation Classrooms
- Hope for the Deaf
- Guinea Ministries
- Board Of Trustee
- Finance Department

== See also ==
- Conferences of the United Methodist Church
- Central Conferences (United Methodist Church)
- College of West Africa
