= Mercados Libres Campesinos =

Los Mercados Libres Campesinos (Farmers' Free Markets), often known by the abbreviation MLC, were farmers' markets that formerly operated in Cuba. Authorized by the Cuban government in 1980, they were ended in 1986 as part of a general program of economic centralization. During their short existence they were credited with increasing the productivity of the Cuban agricultural sector, but also criticized for creating upward pressure on food prices. Since 1994 a new form of farmers' market that is functionally similar to the MLCs has been legal in Cuba.

== Background ==
Throughout the 1970s, Cubans enjoyed steadily increasing wages, resulting in higher levels of disposable income. However, inefficiency in the state-managed food distribution network simultaneously resulted in shortages of some agricultural products. Started in 1980 to alleviate the bottleneck, Mercados Libres Campesinos were sites where private farmers and home gardeners could sell their surplus produce directly to consumers, instead of to the state. Their creation was authorized by Decree No. 66 of the Council of State.

== Operation ==
Under the terms of the authorizing legislation, private farmers could sell produce at MLCs after their quota obligations to the state had first been met. Certain categories of economically vital produce, including sugar, tobacco, and coffee, were prohibited from sale. Farmers were also limited to selling in their local MLC and were required to sell their surplus produce themselves, instead of through intermediaries.

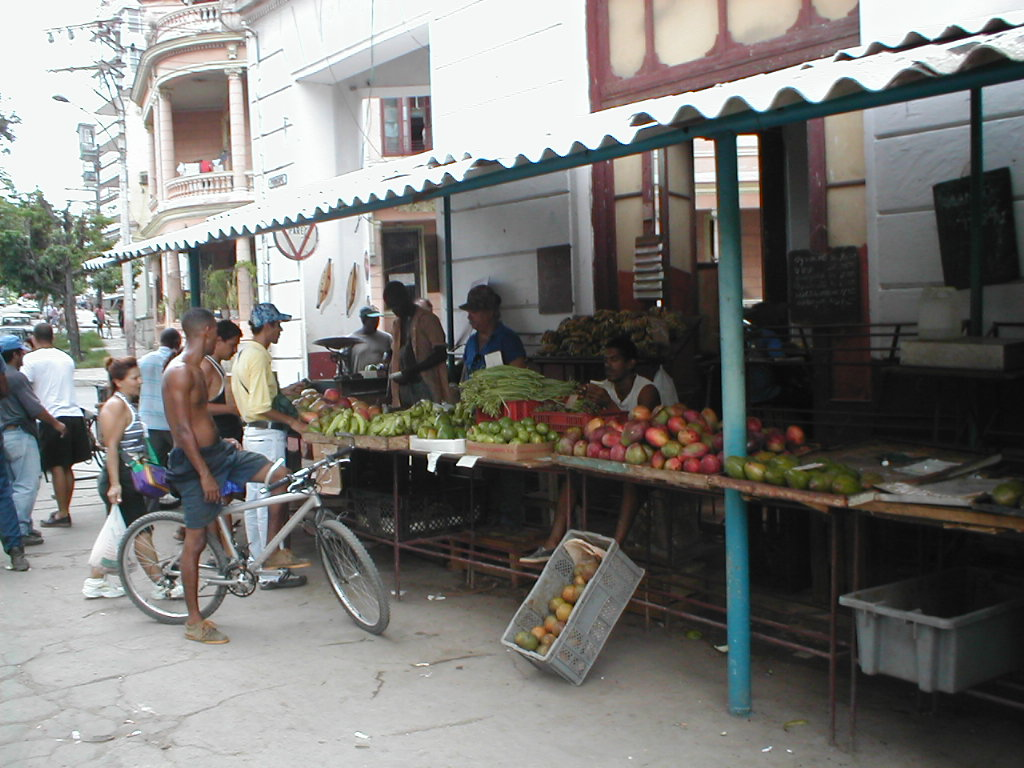
Modern farmers' markets in Cuba, such as this one pictured in 2002, are similar to the former MLCs.

== Growth and demise ==
MLCs were generally credited with increasing agricultural output in Cuba during the period of their existence. In Villa Clara Province, for instance, private sector pork production increased by more than 500-percent, while rice production increased by more than 400-percent. Nonetheless, MLCs came under criticism after producers began diverting portions of their produce from state sales to the more profitable MLCs, contributing to an upward pressure in prices. Public complaints about high prices led to an investigation of selling practices at MLCs by the National Revolutionary Police Force in February 1982. The inquiry uncovered the growing influence of intermediaries, which were officially prohibited. While new regulations imposed that year to better control the situation resulted in a decrease in popularity of the markets, the number of MLCs in operation had, nevertheless, grown to more than 250 by 1985.

The Mercados Libres Campesinos were ended in 1986 as part of a general program of economic centralization.

== Legacy ==
Beginning in 1994, the Cuban government authorized the creation of a new series of farmers' markets that were functionally similar to the MLCs.
