= Multi-level converter =

Method of generating high-voltage wave-forms from lower-voltage components

A multi-level converter (MLC) or (multi-level inverter) is a method of generating high-voltage wave-forms from lower-voltage components. MLC origins go back over a hundred years, when in the 1880s, the advantages of DC long-distance transmission became evident.

Modular multi-level converters (MMC) were investigated by Tricoli et al in 2017. Although their viability for electric vehicles (EV) was established, suitable low-cost semiconductors to make this topology competitive are not currently available (as of 2019).

In 1999, Tolbert described the use of MLC for battery operated electric motors.

Habib's 2018 review paper reviews multi-level inverters (a synonym for MLC) stating the advantages of bi-directional energy flows to power the motor or charge the battery system.

== High-voltage DC converters ==
HVDC converters typically use series connected switched capacitors blocks. The blocks are switched in or out of the circuit to form the desired waveform, typically three-phase AC.

== Low-voltage DC converters ==
Hydrogen generation via electrolysis requires DC currents over several thousand amperes, but DC voltages in the range of only 100...400 VDC. A high voltage modular multi-level converter (MMC) can be adapted by connecting a galvanically isolated LLC resonant converter to each module capacitor. Several half-bridge and full-bridge based MMC topologies are evaluated in. Such a converter can also be used to provide a centralized 400V DC power supply for data centers.

== M^{2}LeC ==
M^{2}LeC (pronounced Emlek), is a form of multi-level converter that combines the functions of generating electric motor wave-forms, with battery charging and management in a single set of power electronics hardware, where the various functions are performed through software alone.
