= Dah Sing Financial Centre =

Skyscraper in Wan Chai, Hong Kong

Coordinates: 22.27450°N 114.1735°E

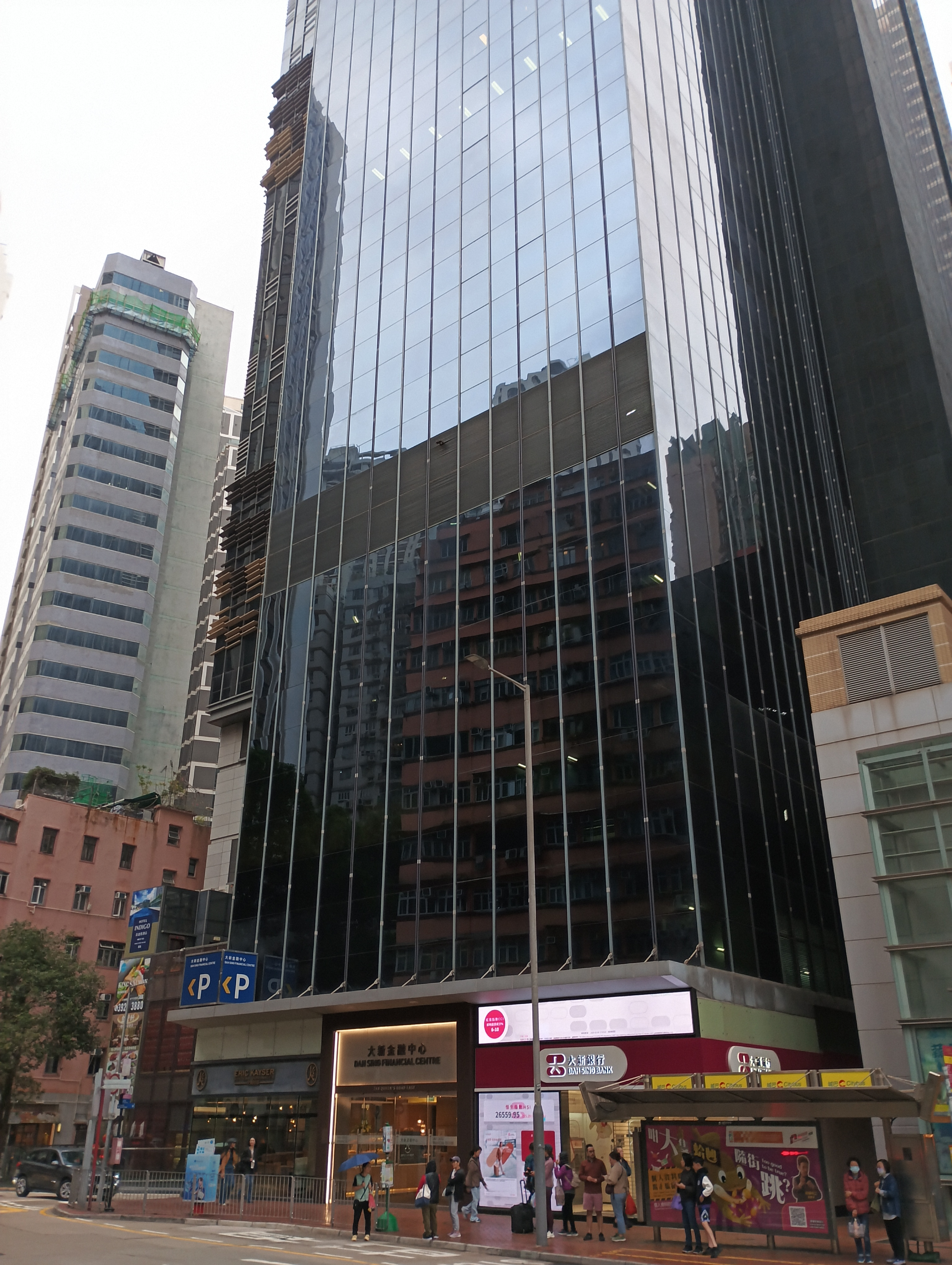
Dah Sing Financial Centre (bottom)

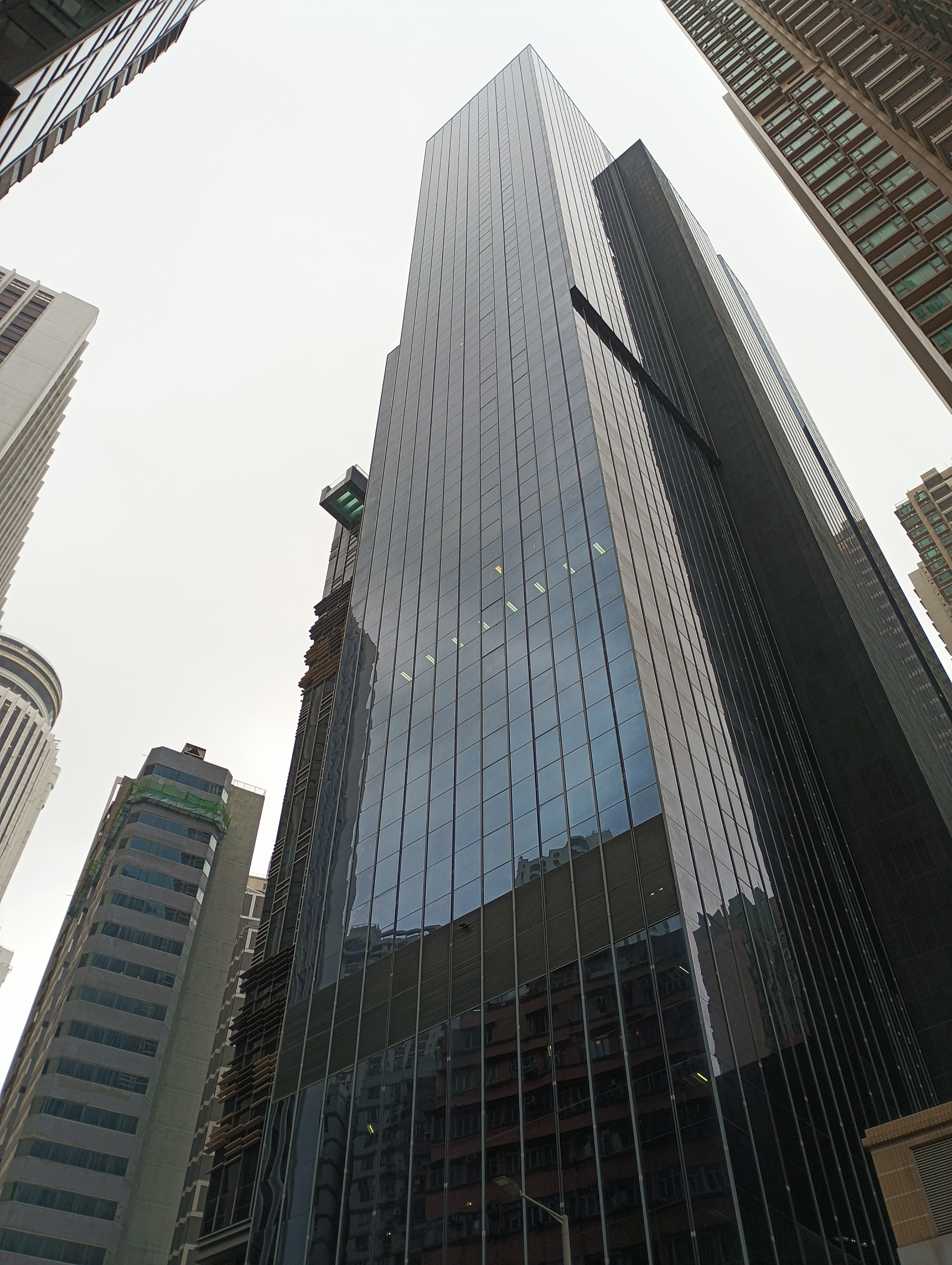
Dah Sing Financial Centre (top)

Dah Sing Financial Centre (formerly called Sunlight Tower, MLC Tower or CEF Life Tower ) is a 40-storey skyscraper located at 248 Queen's Road East, in the Wan Chai district of Hong Kong. It stands 156 metres (512 ft) tall and has 40 floors. Designed by Andrew Lee King Fun & Associates, it was completed in 1998.

The building is managed by Henderson Sunlight Asset Management, a subsidiary of Henderson Land Development Hong Kong, a company which also developed the International Finance center.

The MLC in the name stands for Mutual Life & Citizens Assurance Company - an Australian life insurance company formed in 1908. The building was renamed CEF Life tower when, in 1998, six floors of the building were leased out to CEF Life (Canadian Eastern Life assurance, renamed CEF Lend Lease, now owned by Axa Hong Kong), a company partly owned by Li Ka Shing's Cheung Kong holdings.
