= Methodist Girls High School (Port Harcourt) =

Secondary School in Ghana

Information
- School type: Private high school
- Religious affiliations: Methodist Church Nigeria, Port Harcourt
- Gender: Girls

Methodist Girls High School, formerly Government Girls Secondary School is a private, all-female high school in Port Harcourt, Rivers State. It is owned and operated by the Methodist Church Nigeria, Port Harcourt.
