= Methodist Girls' High School, Point Pedro =

Methodist Girls' High School
- மெதடிஸ்ட் பெண்கள் உயர்தரப் பாடசாலை

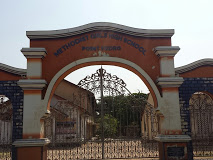

Location
- College Road; Point Pedro; Point Pedro, Jaffna District, Northern Province; Sri Lanka; 9°49′44.40″N 80°13′56.10″E

Information
- School type: Public provincial 1AB
- Motto: Onward upward towards the light
- Founded: 1823; 203 years ago
- Founder: Rev. James Lynch; Rev. Thomas Squance
- School district: Vadamarachchi Education Zone
- Authority: Northern Provincial Council
- School number: 1007027
- Principal: Balarani Sritharan
- Teaching staff: 65
- Grades: 6–13
- Gender: Girls
- Age range: 11–18

Methodist Girls' High School (Tamil: மெதடிஸ்ட் பெண்கள் உயர்தரப் பாடசாலை Metaṭisṭ Peṇkaḷ Uyartarap Pāṭacālai, also known as Methodist Girls' College) is a provincial school in Point Pedro, Sri Lanka. Founded in 1823 by British Methodist missionaries, it is one of Sri Lanka's oldest schools.

== See also ==
- List of schools in Northern Province, Sri Lanka
