= Methodist Girls' High School (Sierra Leone) =

Girls school in Sierra Leone

The Methodist Girls' High School founded as the Wesleyan Girls' High School is a secondary school for girls established by James Taylor, an uncle of Samuel Coleridge-Taylor under the auspices of the Wesleyan Society on 1 January 1880. The school is affiliated to the Methodist Boys' High School (Sierra Leone) established in Freetown by the May family under the auspices of the Methodist Society.

== Sources ==
- http://mghsogadc.com/historymghs.pdf
- https://mghsoldgirlsuk.com/
- http://mghsglobal.org/history.html
