= Insignia Financial =

Australian public company

Insignia Financial Ltd
- Formerly: IOOF Holdings Ltd
- Type: Subsidiary
- Industry: Diversified Financials
- Founded: 1846 (180 years ago) as Independent Order of Odd Fellows (IOOF)
- Headquarters: Melbourne, Australia
- Key people: Allan Griffiths (Chairman); Scott Hartley (CEO)
- Products: Financial advice, investment, superannuation and trustee services
- Number of employees: 5,000 (2023)
- Parent: CC Capital
- Website: insigniafinancial.com.au

Insignia Financial is an Australian financial services company that originated with the Independent Order of Odd Fellows and was formerly known as IOOF Holdings Ltd. It provides clients with a range of financial services including financial advice, investment management, superannuation and estate and trustee services. It was listed on the ASX 200 prior to being purchased by CC Capital via a Special-Purpose Acquisition Company (SPAC) in a sale that finalised on 17 April 2026.

IOOF was founded in 1846 as a friendly society which was formed to provide aid to its members throughout times of sickness and unemployment, as many friendly societies were formed before the widespread introduction of government welfare packages. The society funded these activities through joining fees and re-occurring membership fees.

The company has offices located in Sydney, Melbourne, Perth, Adelaide, Brisbane and Hobart. As of 2023 it serviced approximately two million customers and employed some 5000 employees.

IOOF Holdings Ltd changed its name to Insignia Financial Ltd. at the 25 November 2021 AGM. However, it still maintains the use of "IOOF" branding on some products. In March 2024, Insignia Financial Ltd confirmed that Scott Hartley will take the reins as Chief Executive Officer after the resignation of Renato Mota.

== History ==
IOOF originated as a friendly society with roots leading back to England and the United States. The majority of these societies were formed before government intervened to provide financial welfare where — for a small membership fee — members would receive financial aid and protection for themselves and their family in times of sickness, death and old age. These friendly societies were particularly socially-oriented holding regular meetings which provided entertainment. This emerged particularly in rural and mining communities.

Originally named the 'Independent Order of Odd Fellows', IOOF was brought to Australia and established in Sydney in 1836, but was quickly abolished by the disruption to society caused by the gold rush in Victoria. As such, IOOF flourished in Victoria and almost fully disappeared in Sydney.

Friendly Societies had their greatest expansion in Australia during the late 19th and early 20th century. In fact, a paper published by the Liverpool University Press in 1909 showed that an estimate of approximately 500,000 people were members of a friendly society. This means that around 46% of Australians were benefitting from the services provided by the societies out of a population of 4.8 million.

Prospects also had to sign a form stating that they and their wife were of good health. If the prospects passed all the requirements, local lodge members would vote on the suitability of the prospect by placing either a black or white ball into a ballot box. If more than 3 black balls were placed in the box, the prospect was rejected. This process was hence named 'blackballing'.

During the latter part of the 20th century, the trend towards memberships in friendly societies deteriorated. Friendly societies lost over 30% of their total assets in four years between 1996 and 2000. As government assistance became more prevalent and tax benefits once given to the societies' insurance bond dwindled, it became more economically beneficial to become a customer rather than a member.

On 14 June 2002 IOOF demutualised and distributed their accumulated wealth across its approximately 70,000 members. The catalyst that started the process of IOOF's demutualisation was the demutualisation of the Over 50s mutual friendly society in June 2001, in which 96.5 per cent of their 45,000 members voted in favour of the move. CEO at the time Rob Turner stated that the "strong affirmative vote at Over 50s will mean an early review of the option for the society.". When taken to a vote, 95% of IOOF's members voted in favour of the move to demutualise where each member was given a fixed entitlement of 140 shares as well as additional shares based on the type, number, size and duration of the policies they held. At the time of demutualization, IOOF was valued at $135m to $158m.

On 4 December 2003, IOOF floated on the Australian Securities Exchange with an issue price of $3.15. The move to float on the ASX resulted in excess of $41.8 million being raised. IOOF began trading on the ASX on 5 December 2003, opening at a price of $3.80 – signifying a 64 per cent premium over the original issue price.

IOOF Holdings Ltd changed its name to Insignia Financial Ltd. at the 25 November 2021 AGM.

== Acquisitions ==
=== ANZ's Pensions and Investment Business ===
On 3 February 2020, IOOF announced the successful acquisition of ANZ's OnePath Pensions and Investments Business. IOOF originally announced the plan to acquire OnePath in on 17 October 2017 with the company entering a trading halt pending the capital raising of $450m through institutional placements.

=== MLC ===
In August 2020, announced it had agreed terms to purchase wealth management business MLC from the National Australia Bank. This deal to buy its 134-year-old rival would see IOOF's funds under management (FUM) to increase from $202 billion to a headline figure of $510 billion. It would make IOOF the largest provider of financial advice in Australia. The transaction was completed on 31 May 2021.

== IOOF Foundation ==
In order to recognise the long history of providing support to the community as a friendly society, throughout the process of IOOF's Demutualisation in 2002, the company formed the IOOF Foundation. The foundation provides grants that aid Australian not-for-profit organisations primarily working with disadvantaged families, youth and aged care. According to the ACNC, which the IOOF foundation registered with on 7 May 2014, IOOF gives priority to aged care initiatives that commit to improving the quality of life for individuals and their families that struggle to be self-sufficient by providing long-term solutions that help families move out of poverty or avoid a crisis. IOOF also supports disadvantaged children and youth by funding educational initiatives that help break the cycle of disadvantage. The foundation will favour applicants that address the need for education and training for young people.

As of 30 June 2021, the IOOF Foundation has donated over $16 million to community organisations since inception.

== Criticism ==
=== MLC Takeover ===
The announcement that IOOF would purchase MLC resulted in a negative reaction from most shareholders which saw the share price fall from a pre-announcement trading halt on a 27 August 2020 price of $4.63 to a close of $3.83, a 20% decline in 3 months. At the annual general meeting, almost one-fifth of shareholders voted against IOOF's remuneration report amidst ongoing concerns from investors. Shareholders were not unhappy with the acquisition of MLC, rather with the price that IOOF agreed to pay. The CEO of IOOF, Renato Mota, rejected the accusation that IOOF overpaid, stating: 'By any measure, we did not overpay'. However, even notable analyst Morningstar described the MLC acquisition as ‘high risk’ in terms of risk imposed on the company's balance sheet, but stated that they are confident that these issues can be dealt with in the appropriate manner.

=== 2018 Disqualification of Top Executives ===
In December 2018, the Australian Prudential Regulation Authority (APRA) moved to disqualify five top IOOF executives accusing them of breaching the Superannuation Industry Supervision (SIS) Act and failing to meet prudential standards. According to APRA, IOOF allegedly made an accounting error which resulted in members not receiving the full amount they were entitled. Instead of compensating the members using company resources, IOOF was accused of using member's reserves from their superannuation fund to compensate the members. In light of the publication of the scandal, the value of IOOF fell $900 million with its share price falling 35.4 per cent, to a nine-year low.

In September 2019, APRA failed to disqualify the executives with a 300-page judgement failing to prove the case which was subsequently ruled out by Justice Jayne Jagot. As a result of the inquiry from APRA and the subsequent crash in the share price, IOOF released a statement to the ASX announcing that the current CEO at the time, Chris Kelaher, would leave the company following his return from leave.

== See also ==
- Independent Order of Odd Fellows
