= Methodist Girls' High School (Mamfe) =

Location
- P. O. Box 36 Mamfe, Akuapim North District; Eastern Region; Ghana; 5°56′25″N 0°07′23″W

Information
- Type: Public high school
- Motto: Honesty Integrity Industry
- Religious affiliation: Christian
- Denomination: Methodist Church of Ghana
- Established: 1984
- Head of school: Ms. Sylvia Isabella Laryea
- Gender: Girls
- Age: 13 to 19
- Campus: Methodist girls High School Mamfe
- Houses: 5
- Colours: Blue-black, Yellow and red
- Slogan: Nhenepa, Yenkasa.
- Song: Meghis girls
- Nickname: Meghis
- Website: meghis.com

Methodist Girls' High School (Meghis) is a Ghanaian girls' second-cycle institution at Mamfe, in the Akuapim North District of the Eastern Region.

== History ==
Methodist Girls' Senior High School (MEGHIS) was established in 1984 as a private mixed-gender institution known as Mamfe State College. However, due to financial, administrative, and staffing challenges, the school was handed over to the Methodist Church Ghana, in 1988 and renamed Methodist High School. In January 1993, it was absorbed into the public education system by the government. Later, in September 2003, the school was converted into a single-sex girls' institution, renamed Methodist Girls' Secondary School, and admitted its first batch of female students.

== Achievements ==
Mamfe Methodist Girls' won the 2019 World ROBOFEST competition held at Michigan in the United States of America.

The Methodist Girls' High School (MEGHIS), once again emerged winners of World Robotic Competition in 2020.

Methodist Girls' High School, Mamfe represented Ghana at the Technoxian World Cup 9.0

Methodist Girls' High School, Mamfe proudly represented Ghana at the 12th Africa Tag of War Championship held in Kimberley, South Africa, where the school secured 5 medals across the national and club categories.

== School category ==
Category B

== Notable alumni ==
- Ebony Reigns - dancehall/Afrobeats artist

== See also ==
- Christianity in Ghana
- Education in Ghana
- List of senior high schools in Ghana
