= Mixed lymphocyte reaction =

The mixed lymphocyte reaction (MLR), also called the mixed lymphocyte culture (MLC), is an in vitro immunological assay used to measure the response of lymphocytes from one individual to cells from another genetically different individual of the same species. In a typical MLR, T cells from one donor encounter allogeneic antigen-presenting cells from another donor. Differences in major histocompatibility complex (MHC) molecules, called human leukocyte antigens (HLA) in humans, and other alloantigens can activate the responding T cells, causing effects such as proliferation and cytokine production.

The assay was originally developed to study histocompatibility and immune responses relevant to transplantation. Although high-resolution HLA typing has replaced MLR as the primary method for donor-recipient matching, MLR remains useful as a functional assay of alloreactivity. It is used in transplantation research, immune monitoring, and studies of immunomodulatory drugs and cell-based therapies.

== History ==
The MLR was first recognized in the early 1960s when researchers mixed leukocytes from two unrelated donors in culture and observed that the cells stimulated one another. The responding lymphocytes underwent blast transformation, DNA synthesis, and cell division, whereas cells from identical twins showed little or no response.

Responder T cells can proliferate in response to allogeneic stimulator cells without prior exposure to the donor's antigens. This strong primary response reflects the relatively high frequency of T cells capable of recognizing allogeneic cells. Proliferation in the MLR was traditionally measured by adding radioactive tritium-labelled thymidine ([^{3}H]thymidine) to the culture. Dividing cells incorporate the labelled thymidine into newly synthesized DNA, allowing proliferation to be quantified by measuring radioactivity.

Because the MLR reproduces T-cell recognition of genetically different cells in vitro, it became an experimental model for studying cellular alloreactivity, including cell-mediated immune responses relevant to graft rejection and graft-versus-host disease. Standard MLR assays has also been adapted for use in a variety of animal species.

The leukocyte subpopulations involved in the MLR were first characterized by using cells from neonatally thymectomized and bursectomized chickens. No MLR occurred when the Responder cells came from thymectomized animals, whereas bursectomized chicken leukocytes reacted in culture demonstrating that T-cells were the major cell type in responder cell populations.

Originally, this assay was used to study possible donor-recipient incompatibilities for graft transplants to help predict better outcomes. However, the standard for graft matching now depends on a series of HLA-matching done with molecular typing methods.

== Principle ==
The assay set-up consists of purifying responder lymphocytes from peripheral blood, thymus, lymph nodes or spleen and co-culturing with stimulator cells. Stimulator cell populations that also contain T-cells (Two way mixed lymphocyte reaction) will replicate in the presence of the Responder cells, therefore for a One way mixed lymphocyte reaction, stimulator cells are prevented from replicating by irradiation or treatment with mitomycin C, a DNA crosslinker to prevent cell replication. Maximum measurable cellular proliferation occurs around 5–7 days.

== Applications ==
For research purposes, the MLR cell-based assay continues to provide an in vitro correlate of T cell function. Further characterization of the lymphocytes, accessory cells (dendritic cells, macrophage) and cytokines that participate in the MLR have been done as this assay continues to be used to define mechanisms for understanding cellular immune function in vitro.
