= Telstra Tower =

Observation and communications tower in Australia

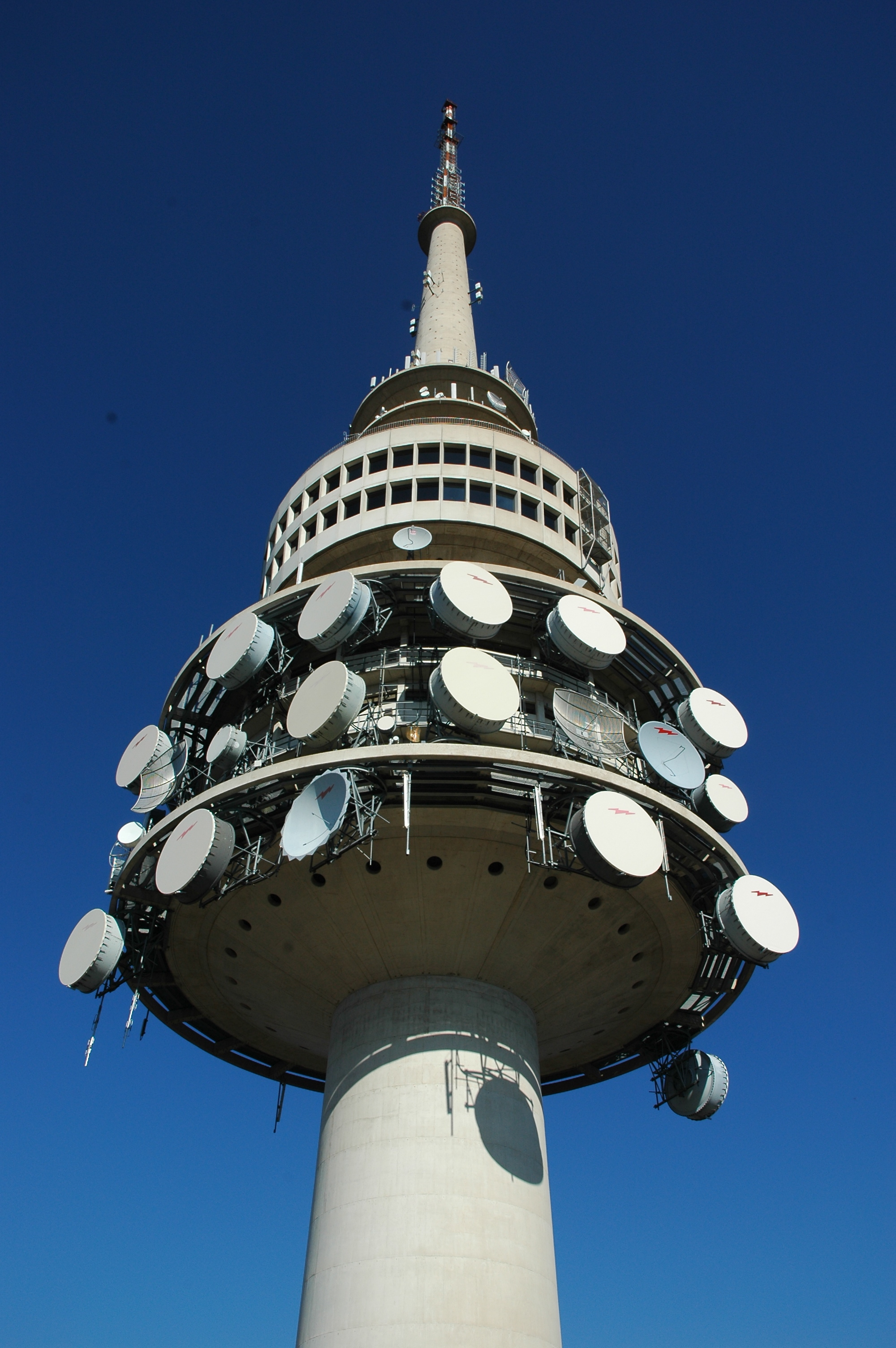
- Telstra Tower in 2018
- Alternative names: Black Mountain Tower, Telecom Tower

General information
- Type: Observation and communications tower
- Location: Canberra, Australia
- Coordinates: 35°16′32″S 149°05′52″E
- Construction started: October 1972
- Completed: 1977
- Opening: 15 May 1980
- Cost: A$16.3 million (1980); A$88.2 million (2025, adjusted for inflation)

Height
- Antenna spire: 195.2 m (640 ft)

Technical details
- Floor count: 10

Design and construction
- Architects: Richard Ure and the Commonwealth Department of Works
- Main contractor: Concrete Constructions

Telstra Tower (also known as Black Mountain Tower and formerly Telecom Tower) is a telecommunications tower and lookout that is situated above the summit of Black Mountain in Australia's capital city of Canberra. It is named after Australia's largest telecommunications company, Telstra. Rising 195.2 metres (640 ft) above the mountain summit, it is the tallest structure in Canberra and a landmark of the city. The tower offers panoramic views of Canberra and its surrounding countryside from an indoor observation deck and two outdoor viewing platforms.

The tower was closed to the public in 2021, and is currently set to reopen in the summer of 2027/28.

== History ==
In April 1971, the Postmaster General (PMG) at the time commissioned the Commonwealth Department of Housing and Construction to carry out a feasibility study in relation to a tower on Black Mountain accommodating both communication services and facilities for visitors. The tower was to replace the microwave relay station on Red Hill and the television broadcast masts already on Black Mountain.

Design of the tower was the responsibility of the Department of Housing and Construction, however a conflict arose with the National Capital Development Commission which, at the time, had complete control over planning within the Australian Capital Territory.

During the approval process of the tower, protests arose on aesthetic and ecological grounds. Some people felt that the tower would dominate other aesthetic Canberra structures due to its location above Black Mountain and within a nature reserve. There was a brief green ban imposed by the Builders Labourers Federation (under the influence of Jack Mundey) that eventually failed. A case was brought before the High Court of Australia arguing that the Federal Government did not have the constitutional power to construct the tower. The decision was made in favour of the government and construction was able to commence.

Black Mountain Tower was opened on 15 May 1980 by Prime Minister Malcolm Fraser. It was officially named Telecom Tower, and when the telecommunications company was rebranded in 1993, became Telstra Tower.

Prior to the construction of the tower, CTC-TV (now known as Southern Cross 10) had its studios located at the top of Black Mountain until new studios were constructed in Watson in 1974. Also located on the top were two guy-wired masts, one for CTC-TV channel 7 and the other one for the local ABC TV station broadcasting on channel 3. These were demolished in 1980 after the tower had opened.

The Alto Tower Restaurant, a revolving restaurant in the tower, closed on 14 February 2013.

The tower was closed in July 2021 because of restrictions on public gatherings within the ACT during the COVID-19 pandemic. Since then InfraCo has been working on developing a long-term strategy for the usage of the tower.

In 2023, it was reported that the target date for reopening of the tower was 2025, and that the tower would receive a makeover celebrating the culture of the local Ngunnawal people.

In 2026, the ACT Government signed a heads of agreement with Telstra which detailed plans for the tower. Considerations include visitor experiences, community spaces, and supporting infrastructure. A reopening date of the summer of 2027/28 has been projected, and the tower's revitalisation is set to reflect themes including Black Mountain, Canberra's character and culture, the tower's history, and telecommunications history in Australia.

== Facilities ==
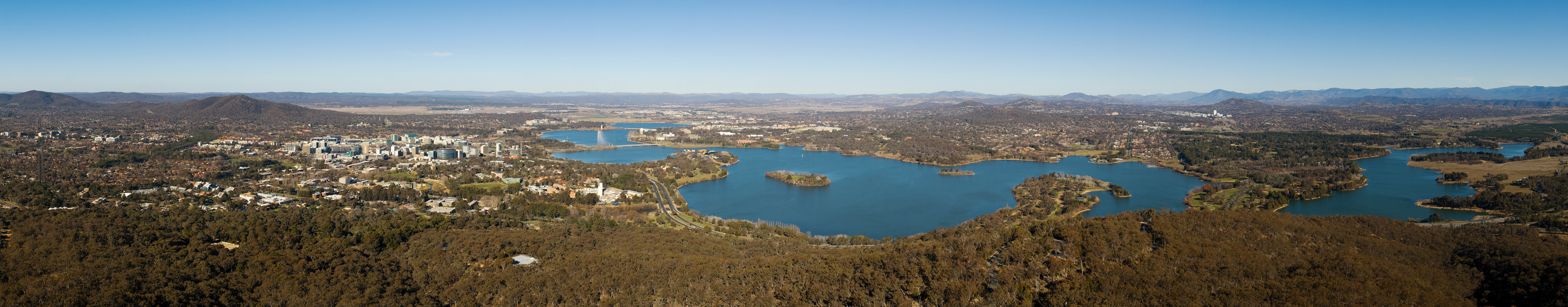
Panoramic view of Canberra and distant New South Wales, as seen from the tower.

Telstra Tower provides important communication facilities for Canberra. There are three floors of business, sales and radio communication facilities located between the 30.5 metre and 42.7 metre levels providing space for communication dishes, platforms and equipment for mobile services on the tower.

The tower's currently closed public viewing platforms have provided 360 degree views of Canberra and the surrounding city and countryside. Prior to its closure to the public in mid-2021, visitors to Telstra Tower could see the city from the enclosed viewing gallery or from the two open viewing platforms.

Former facilities included Canberra's only revolving restaurant which completed a full rotation every 81 minutes, allowing diners to experience a changing view throughout their meal. The restaurant was closed in 2013. In the lower level of the Tower's entrance foyer there was an exhibition titled "Making Connections", which traced the history of Australian telecommunications from the earliest days into the 21st century. A theatre showed a video produced shortly after the tower opened on the tower's design and construction.

== Reception ==
Telstra Tower is widely regarded as one of the most symbolic landmarks in Canberra and a major tourist attraction, with an estimated 430,000 visitors each year by 2017. In 1989 the World Federation of Great Towers invited the tower to join such distinguished monuments as the CN Tower in Toronto, Blackpool Tower in England and the Empire State Building in New York City.

The tower is regarded as one of the most visually prominent structures on the Canberra skyline, visible from many parts of Canberra and Queanbeyan.
