= MLC Limited =

Former Australian financial services company

MLC
- Industry: Financial services
- Founded: 1886
- Headquarters: Melbourne, Australia
- Products: Superannuation, insurance, investments
- Services: Financial planning
- Number of employees: 5,000
- Parent: Nippon Life
- Website: www.mlc.com.au

MLC is an Australian business that provides investments, insurance and superannuation solutions to corporate, institutional and retail customers.

== History ==
The company traces its origins to the Citizens’ Assurance Company Limited, registered on 31 December 1886 for the stated purpose “to popularise Industrial Life Assurance, and to carry it to the homes of the working classes by issuing policies for small amounts and receiving the premiums thereon each week”. It became known as Mutual Life & Citizens Assurance Company Limited in 1908.

In 1982, Lend Lease acquired 50% of MLC Life Limited and in 1985 acquired the balance of the company. MLC's multi-manager, multi-style investment philosophy was introduced in 1986. In June 2000, MLC was sold to the National Australia Bank. for $4.56 billion, one of the biggest mergers in Australian corporate history.

In October 2016, the insurance division of MLC limited was divested by National Australia Bank, with Nippon Life Japan acquiring a majority stake (80%).

On 31 May 2021, the National Australia Bank sold its remaining "MLC" branded wealth management businesses to Insignia Financial (then known as IOOF).

== Legacy ==
Due to divestments in the early 21st century, there are now two businesses, with no ownership links, that both use "MLC" in their branding:

- MLC Limited trading as MLC Life Insurance, the original insurance company registered in 1886 as "Citizens' Assurance Company Limited", is an insurance company which is part of the Nippon Life Insurance Group.
- MLC Wealth, which consists of the investment and superannuation businesses that MLC Limited expanded into in the 20th century, is part of the Insignia Financial Group, which consists of Insignia Financial Ltd and its related bodies corporate.

== MLC buildings ==
Over its long history, MLC Has occupied a number of prominent buildings in Sydney. The MLC Building, built in 1936-8 for MLC as its headquarters on the corner of Martin Place and Castlereagh Street, remains a landmark in the Sydney City Centre. Across from this building, on the south side of Martin Place, is the MLC Centre, one of Harry Seidler's best known works and Sydney's tallest office building until 1992.

Lovett Tower in Canberra was known until 2000 as the MLC Building, and was the tallest building in the city from its completion in 1973 until 2020.

Elsewhere in the world, the MLC Tower in Hong Kong was built in 1998, and the MLC Building in Wellington was built in 1940.

MLC's head office in North Sydney was completely refurbished in 2002 and renamed Campus MLC. Campus MLC won the 2002 RAIA NSW Interior Architecture Award and the 2002 RAIA National Interior Architecture Award.
