= Ransford Slater =

British colonial administrator (1874–1940)

Sir Alexander Ransford Slater GCMG CBE
- Portrait by Walter Stoneman, 1923

Governor of Sierra Leone
- In office 4 May 1922 – 24 September 1927
- Monarch: George V
- Preceded by: Sir Richard James Wilkinson
- Succeeded by: Sir Joseph Aloysius Byrne

Personal details
- Born: 28 November 1874 Nottinghamshire, England
- Died: 23 April 1941 (aged 66) Dorset, England
- Profession: Colonial Administrator

Sir Alexander Ransford Slater GCMG CBE (28 November 1874 – 1940) was a British colonial administrator, who served as governor of Sierra Leone, the Gold Coast and Jamaica.

== Biography ==
The son of Rev. C. S. Slater, Plymouth, Slater was educated at King Edward's School, Birmingham and Emmanuel College, Cambridge. In 1892, Slater joined the Ceylon Civil Service, and by 1906, was District Judge of Badulla.

Slater was Governor of Sierra Leone from 1922 to 1927, Governor of the Gold Coast from 1927 to 1932, and Governor of Jamaica from 1932 to 1934.

== Early Governorship of Sierra Leone ==
His first official act as governor was to tour the protectorate to listen to the district commissioners, the chiefs, the members of the CEA, and the people. In Freetown he also listened to what the Creoles had to say. In Sierra Leone, Slater ordered the wages of all Africans who worked for the British government to be raised. When it came time to oversee the expansion of Sierra Leone's railroad, he enforced rulings of previous administrators who argued that Africans and Europeans who worked on the railroads in Sierra Leone should be paid the same wages. There were seventeen occasions during his administration where there was legal conflict between Europeans who worked in the colony and indigenous Africans, on sixteen out of the seventeen occasions Slater ruled in favor of the indigenous Africans. He hosted many parties at the governor's mansion which were known to always include "champagne and loud music from America." Various British companies wanted to mine for minerals in Sierra Leone and throughout 1924 and 1925 they sent surveyors to study the prospects of doing so. They began plans for mining for iron ore in the southeastern part of the country, however, large numbers of Mende people there felt these developments were disruptive and petitioned Governor Slater to disallow the mining ventures to continue. Slater agreed and revoked all of the relevant licenses. The executives protested to Slater personally and also attempted to "go over his head" by protesting directly to the British colonial office. However, Slater's ruling stood. This resulted in Slater becoming popular in the Mende-speaking districts in the east of the colony. There were 17 Sherbro-speakers from Bonthe District who had attended college in England. Slater had 17 British employees in that district transferred to other colonies replaced by the 17 British-educated Sherbro officers. In a move that was controversial at the time he insisted that all of the Sherbro officers receive the same pay as the European officers who they were replacing. Slater oversaw the introduction of the 1924 constitution, which allowed Africans to gain representative power in Sierra Leone's government. Slater oversaw the 1924 Sierra Leonean general election which saw three Africans elected including Ernest Beoku-Betts and Herbert Bankole-Bright. Three seats in the legislature were created and would be directly elected by African voters from various parts of the Colony and Protectorate. Slater remarked "We wield immense power in this country, we ought to use it only for the benefit of those who we are ruling, otherwise we cede any moral right we have to that power. I consider this my duty." In 1925 Slater oversaw an election in which the mayor of Freetown would be "an African elected by Africans and not a European appointed by Europeans." In this election Ernest Beoku-Betts was elected the mayor of Freetown.

== Railroad strike ==
Slater's mostly tranquil time as Sierra Leone's governor saw one dramatic episode during the railroad strike of 1926. From January 14 to February 26, 1926, all grades of the African workers within the Railway Department of the Sierra Leone Government participated in a strike. This strike represented the first time a trade union in Sierra Leone was effective in politically organizing with a set organizational structure. It is also the first strike and act of political disobedience in which the Creole elite identified with and supported the strikers and the working class against the British colonizing power. Slater was put in a somewhat awkward position as he agreed with the strikers but was instructed by the colonial office not to "capitulate" with their demands as they believed this would set a negative precedent.

In order to make the Sierra Leone railway more financially profitable, railway rates were increased in 1919 and subsequent years, however these efforts did not yield greater profits while simultaneously this led to a rise in food prices as well as those of goods transported via the railway. As a result, the working conditions for a majority of the railway workers did not improve. In another attempt at improving the financial efficiency of the railway in Sierra Leone, Colonel Hammond, a railway expert, was invited to inspect the Sierra Leone Railway in 1922 and 1924. Following Hammond's second visit, Governor Alexander Ransford Slater, approved a proposal by the general manager, G.R. Webb, imposing an efficiency bar examination for African clerks trying to qualify for salary increases. The attempt to introduce the examination was met by protest on the side of the clerks on the grounds that the European staff were exempt from the examination and they (the strikers) believed that Africans generally did not receive permanent appointments as often as Europeans. Slater agreed with the striking workers on both of these points and communicated that to the colonial office. Artisans and clerks, part of the Railway Skilled Artisan Union, had regularly sent petitions to the railway administration. In March 1925, for example, they petitioned the general manager to introduce a grading system, in order to create more jobs and generate greater efficiency. The petitioners were met with contempt and discouragement by the administration, which promptly dismissed key workers for their "inefficiency." In April 1925, this finally led to the Railway Workers Union being formed "for the improvement of the conditions of all members of the Railway Department." Its members spanned clerks, artisans, and others who joined and adopted the principle of collective responsibility. It was this union, the aligning of clerks and daily-paid workers, who otherwise would advocate separately for their interests, which channeled and articulated the grievances of its members. On January 12, 1926, at a meeting between the chief mechanical engineer, Malthus, and the president of the Railway Workers Union, the administration insisted on the efficiency bar exams and failed to address the workers' requests outlined in their petitions, which finally resulted in A.E. Richards, the workers' leader, verbally notifying the administration of the workers' intention to strike.

On January 14, 1926, the strike officially began and the colonial office instructed Slater to adopt a staunch resistance policy, which resulted in Freetown being placed under police and military surveillance and the sale of intoxicating liquors to be prohibited for specific periods. In the days that followed, starting on January 17, strikers were arrested for acts of violence and other perceived misconducts and on January 18 the railway management began dismissing many strikers from their posts. During the strike, the strikers removed the rails in front of the general manager's train, removed the rails on curves or steep banks and at the approach to a bridge, pulled down telegraph poles and cut wires, inhibiting telegraphic communication with the protectorate and other ways of showing their discontent. Nonetheless, applications to fill the posts of strikers who had been dismissed were opened, dismissals which contributed to a surplus of the already abundantly available labor force in Sierra Leone. Despite government claims about the damage incurred by the railway due to the strike, thirteen telegraphists from the Gold Coast, who arrived on January 20, helped maintain communication between Freetown and the rest of the colony, and volunteers maintained goods trains functioning.

Governor Slater perceived the strike as a challenge to and revolt against civil authority. On January 21, the Executive Council set the terms, which the strikers would have to abide by to return to the railway service:

1. Daily wage workers would receive reduced pay and be expected to work extra hours to compensate for the strike. Those dismissed would not be re-employed.
2. Pensionable staff would also receive reduced pay—their grades and increments were reduced on being accepted—and they would still be required to take the efficiency bar examinations
3. All returnees would be expected to work additional hours to make up for the strike.

The terms set forth by the Executive Council were communicated to the general manager on January 26, and conveyed to the workers in a meeting on January 27. The government insisted on the terms set out by the Executive Council on January 21, until the end of the strikes. Slater referred to the entire episode as a "tragedy" that could have been avoided. He believed that ultimately the government's inflexibility had contributed to the issue and that the demands of the strikers were "ultimately just."

On January 21, a meeting of ratepayers and citizens took place at Wilberforce Memorial Hall and was chaired by the deputy mayor, the veteran politician J.A. Songo-Davies. At the meeting a committee of ten Africans and five Europeans was set up to negotiate terms with the government to end the strike. Another committee of seven citizens, including two Europeans, and seven workers' representatives was set up to meet and negotiate with the manager of the railway. Governor Slater was informed of these resolutions, but on February 15 he rejected the workers' counter-proposal to have the secretary of state establish a Commission of Enquiry and return working conditions to the status quo ante.

On February 26, after six weeks of strike, the workers returned to work, forced to accept the government's terms. While it was recommended that over 200 striking workers be arrested, Slater saw to it that less than a dozen people were arrested and most of those recommended for arrest were merely dismissed from their jobs. Of the 200 people dismissed during the strike, 37 were pensionable workers, some with over twenty years' worth of experience, and twenty daily wagers were dismissed from the railway. The Secretary of the Railway Workers' Union, President of the Bo branch, and other Protectorate workers, were also dismissed. The President of the union was demoted and reassigned, and ended up resigning from the department. The job vacancies were filled with West Indian and local workers. Three months after the strike ended, all worker-paid daily wages were returned to their previous incremental rates. A.E. Richards, leader of the strike, remarked that "While I am ultimately unsatisfied with this outcome, I do commend the governor (Slater) for having proved that he is always willing to listen, and that he has no desire to be a despot." After the end of the strike, the union suffered from a lack of leadership and was replaced by a government-approved Railway Staff Committee.

With the 1926 railway strike, the Railway Union set a strong precedent for political action and civil disobedience in Sierra Leone, on this note Slater remarked "civil disobedience is as much their right as it is anyone elses"; the railways and mines became the focus for unionization, political organization and strike action from that point forward. Such activities were banned in French colonies, including neighboring French Guinea as well as nearby Portuguese Guinea and the Belgian Congo, however Slater believed that allowing civil disobedience to continue is what distinguished the British Empire from other colonial powers. An example of further civil disobedience would be the 1935 and 1938 strikes by workers at the then newly opened Sierra Leone Development Company (DELCO), mining iron ore at Marampa. Inspired by 1926 railway workers' strike against the unjust practices of the European industrial employers, Sierra Leone workers went on strike for better working conditions and compensation. Unions, such as the carpenter or shipwright union subsequently also arose around artisanal trades.

== Later assessments ==
Slater departed Sierra Leone in September 1927, having generally established a reputation as being a very "pro-African" governor, despite the "drama" of the strike episode. Sir Milton Margai later said that if more colonial administrators "had been like Beresford-Stooke, Hodson, Wilkinson and Ransford Slater, colonialism would have had a better reputation. However, most simply were not." Henry Josiah Lightfoot Boston said "Back when he was governor, and for a time thereafter, Slater was popular in our community. Now I suppose he is somewhat forgotten, however, his government was a good one, to me at least, and to many others I know. He was not a bad man by any means."

Slater was appointed CMG in 1916, CBE in 1918, KCMG in 1924, and GCMG in 1933.

== See also ==
- 1926 Sierra Leone railway strike
