= 1926 Sierra Leone railway strike =

1926 strike in Sierra Leone

From January 14 to February 26, 1926, all grades of the African workers within the Railway Department of the Sierra Leone Government participated in a strike. This strike represented the first time a trade union in Sierra Leone was effective in politically organizing with a set organizational structure. It is also the first strike and act of political disobedience in which the Creole elite identified with and supported the strikers and the working class against the British colonizing power.

== Historical background ==
The financial situation in Sierra Leone in the mid-1920s following World War I was not dire. While the deficit for 1921 reached £343,171, by 1923, it was at a surplus of £116,926. The high unemployment rate after the war had gradually been reduced, but the wage rates of the majority of government artisan workers, throughout this improving economic situation, had remained stagnant. In 1919, this engendered a railway strike, where the railway workers tried to build alliances with other government workers and persuaded 2,000 workers of the police force to join them in a strike for higher wages.

In order to make the railway more financially profitable, railway rates were increased in 1919 and subsequent years, which did not yield greater profits and raised food prices and those of goods transported via the railway. Thus, the working class conditions, which included the majority of the railway workers, did not improve. In another attempt at improving the financial efficiency of the railway in Sierra Leone, Colonel Hammond, a railway expert, was invited to inspect the Sierra Leone Railway in 1922 and 1924. Following Hammond's second visit, Governor Alexander Ransford Slater, approved a proposal by the general manager, G.R. Webb, imposing an efficiency bar examination for African clerks trying to qualify for salary increases. The attempt to introduce the examination was met by protest on the side of the clerks, who criticized the European staff being exempt from the examination and the failure to give Africans generally permanent appointments. This attempt at introducing a discriminatory policy by the government helped to unify middle class, white-collar Creole clerks, who might otherwise not have been such strong voices in the union, and more manual daily-wage laborers in their discontent and subsequent activism in the railway union. Artisans and clerks, part of the Railway Skilled Artisan Union, had regularly sent petitions to the railway administration. In March 1925, for example, they petitioned the general manager to introduce a grading system, in order to create more jobs and generate greater efficiency. The petitioners were met with contempt and discouragement by the administration, which promptly dismissed key workers for their "inefficiency."

In April 1925, this finally led to the Railway Workers Union being formed "for the improvement of the conditions of all members of the Railway Department." Its members spanned clerks, artisans, and others who joined and adopted the principle of collective responsibility. It was this union, the aligning of clerks and daily-paid workers, who otherwise would advocate separately for their interests, which channeled and articulated the grievances of its members. On January 12, 1926, at a meeting between the chief mechanical engineer, Malthus, and the president of the Railway Workers Union, the administration insisted on the efficiency bar exams and failed to address the workers' requests outlined in their petitions, which finally resulted in A.E. Richards, the workers' leader, verbally notifying the administration of the workers' intention to strike.

== The strike ==
=== Union background and workers' involvement ===
On January 14, 1926, the strike officially began and the government, adopting a staunch resistance policy, placed Freetown under police and military surveillance, prohibiting the sale of intoxicating liquors for specific periods, etc. In the days that followed, starting on January 17, strikers were arrested for acts of violence and other perceived misconducts and on January 18 the railway management began dismissing many strikers from their posts. During the strike, the strikers employed different methods of revolt that included removing the rails in front of the general manager's train, removing the rails on curves or steep banks and at the approach to a bridge, pulling down telegraph poles and cutting wires, inhibiting telegraphic communication with the protectorate and other ways of showing their discontent. Nonetheless, applications to fill the posts of strikers who had been dismissed were opened, dismissals which contributed to a surplus of the already abundantly available labor force in Sierra Leone. Despite government claims about the damage incurred by the railway due to the strike, thirteen telegraphists from the Gold Coast, who arrived on January 20, helped maintain communication between Freetown and the rest of the colony, and volunteers maintained goods trains functioning. Governor Slater perceived the strike as a challenge to and revolt against colonial (civil) authority. On January 21, the Executive Council set the terms, which the strikers would have to abide by to return to the railway service:

1. Daily wage workers would receive reduced pay and be expected to work extra hours to compensate for the strike. Those dismissed would not be re-employed.
2. Pensionable staff would also receive reduced pay—their grades and increments were reduced on being accepted—and they would still be required to take the efficiency bar examinations
3. All returnees would be expected to work additional hours to make up for the strike.

The terms set forth by the Executive Council were communicated to the general manager on January 26, and conveyed to the workers in a meeting on January 27. The government insisted on the terms set out by the Executive Council on January 21, until the end of the strikes.

=== Involvement of the colonized elite ===
In 1926, in contradistinction to the strike in 1919, the Creole intelligentsia, the majority of the municipality, openly supported the workers. This may also have been because, relevant to the dynamics of Anglo-Creole relations, the atmosphere was very racially charged during the time of the 1926 strikes, which underscored the racial division between the African workers and their mostly white industrial employers, more so than in 1919. At the turn of the century, thinly veiled racialism evoked by the application of Darwin's evolutionary theory to scientifically establish the superiority of the white races, had solidified racial authority and given rise to particular dynamics between the colonizers and the colonized elite, where the colonizing Europeans did not disguise their contempt for the abilities of educated, though racially "inferior" Africans. After World War I, this yielded an increasing number of racially motivated instances of physical violence against Creole citizens which were seemingly condoned by the government; for example, the 1926 case of Barber, an African customs officer who was assaulted by an assistant district commissioner, A.H. Stocks, for alleged insolence (an incident also known as the Stocks affair). Other examples of the increasing divide between the Creole elites and the colonial authority include the racial segregation in Freetown due to establishing an exclusive European residential area at Hill Station in 1904 with its own railway. Thus, the racial discrimination experienced by the Creole elite gradually caused them to identify with the grievances of the working class as common sufferers against the colony from which they benefitted. Through the more obvious demonstrations of racialism, it also became clearer that the strike was a symptom of the conflict between white imperialism and nascent African nationalism. The city council on January 15 proposed to discuss strikers' grievances with them, but this was shut down by the colonial secretary H.C. Luke on behalf of Slater, because giving the City Council permission to intervene would have legitimized the grievances of the strikers. Local newspapers, such as the Sierra Leone Weekly News and other publications, published editorials on the chronology of the strike and criticizing the governmental violent attempts to intimidate the workers.

On January 21, a meeting of ratepayers and citizens took place at Wilberforce Memorial Hall and was chaired by the deputy mayor, the veteran politician J.A. Songo-Davies. At the meeting a committee of ten Africans and five Europeans was set up to negotiate terms with the government to end the strike. Another committee of seven citizens, including two Europeans, and seven workers' representatives was set up to meet and negotiate with the manager of the railway. Governor Slater was informed of these resolutions, but on February 15 he rejected the workers' counter-proposal to have the secretary of state establish a Commission of Enquiry and return working conditions to the status quo ante. Given that the government held the monopoly of coercive forces, neither the strikers nor the elite had any leverage.

Nonetheless, the elite via the press, and public organizations, exhausted the options available to them—such as setting up a Strike Relief Fund at a "Support the Strike Meeting" on February 8, 1926—to support the workers' demands and show solidarity with their strike. By the end of March, the Strike Relief Fund had supported the strikers with nearly £500 of donations, from the Sierra Leone Friendly Society in Lagos, Nigerian allies; Sierra Leoneans residing in Sekondi; Gold Coast and Creoles in Kumasi; as well as Sierra Leoneans in Monrovia, among others.

In the end, the Strike Relief Fund came too late to sustain the strike, especially given the real material needs of the workers on strike.

=== End of the strike ===
On February 26, after six weeks of strike, the workers returned to work, forced to accept the government's terms. Less than a dozen people were arrested. Of the 200 people dismissed during the strike, 37 were pensionable workers, some with over twenty years' worth of experience, and twenty daily wagers were dismissed from the railway. The Secretary of the Railway Workers' Union, President of the Bo branch, and other Protectorate workers, were also dismissed. The President of the union was demoted and reassigned, and ended up resigning from the department. The job vacancies were filled with West Indian and local workers. Three months after the strike ended, all worker-paid daily wages were returned to their previous incremental rates. After the end of the strike, the union suffered from a lack of leadership and was replaced by a government-approved Railway Staff Committee.

The end of the strike was a capitulation to superior forces, but this was one of the first instances of defiance and protest against the British in Sierra Leone, which presented a major challenge to the colonial government.

== Political consequences ==
As a consequence of their support for the strikes, the elites, especially those serving in political functions, such as Dr. H.C Bankole-Bright and E.S. Beoku-Betts, who served as the first elected African members in the Legislative Council, received severe backlash. These hostile relations only served to galvanize the intelligentsia and the workers in an act of national resistance. This led to the government cracking down on the African elected members of various councils in the following ways:

1. Because the Creole elite had supported the strikers, after the end of the strike, the colonial government considered suspending the 1924 constitution, with which Africans had been able to gain representative power, since a number of Africans were elected to the Legislative Council.
2. The city council, an important political organ for aspiring Creole politicians, was dissolved in December 1926 in a political act expressing unbridled British discontent with the Creole elite; prior attempts to dissolve the city council had been blocked by the secretary of state for the colonies. Since the city council was a largely African-controlled political apparatus, its members served both on the Legislative and the city council, the colonial government perceived its political sway in favor of strikers as threatening. From then on, for the next twenty-two years, the municipality was directly administered by the colonial government.
3. In a further backlash against educated Africans, African civil servants were condemned for their part in defiance of the colonial authority and discriminated against, with the promotion of Africans, declining noticeably after 1926.

In the end, according to academics such as Martin Kilson, this institutionally violent and repressive response of the government to the strikers, brought them, and the urban masses, into direct contact with its coercive power, providing an important insight to the workers, in their attempt at civil disobedience, into the role of force in maintaining colonial authority.

== Labor unions in Sierra Leone ==
With the 1926 railway strike, the Railway Union set a strong precedent for political action and civil disobedience; the railways and mines became the focus for unionization, political organization and strike action. An example of this are the 1935 and 1938 strikes by workers at the then newly opened Sierra Leone Development Company (DELCO), mining iron ore at Marampa. Inspired by 1926 railway workers' strike against the unjust practices of the European industrial employers, they went on strike for better working conditions and compensation. Unions, such as the carpenter or shipwright union subsequently also arose around artisanal trades. This broad structure of trade unions, in addition to public sector workers, still exists and twenty-six organizations constitute the Sierra Leone Labour Congress.
