= Bankole Akpata =

Nigerian political activist

Bankole Akpata was a Nigerian political activist.

== Early life and education ==
Akpata was born in Nigeria and came from a prominent political family that hailed from the Benin region. Akpata moved to Britain from Nigeria to study in his early twenties. Records show that he lived in several addresses during his stay in London including South Villas, Camden where one of his house mates included Amy Ashwood Garvey, co-founder of the Universal Negro Improvement Association, and Primrose Hill Gardens, Hampstead, multiple occupancy accommodation he shared with Joe Appiah, a member of the West African Students Union, and others.

== Political activity in Britain ==
Whilst living in Britain Akpata was a founding members of the West African National Secretariat (WANS) along with Bankole Awoonor-Renner, Kojo Botsio, Kwame Nkrumah, Ashie Nikoi and I.T.A Wallace-Johnson which came about after the 5th Pan African Congress held in Manchester, Britain in October 1945. He served as the assistant secretary then the secretary of WANS. Working with Nkrumah Akpata helped established and published a journal The New African under the auspices of WANS. During his stay in London Akpata was a leading member of the West African Students Union. He also joined the British Communist Party.

When WANS folded Akpata went to study at the Charles University, Prague having accepted a scholarship to do a masters degree, subsequently followed by a PhD. The Guyanese writer, Jan Carew, was a fellow student who Akpata met during his student years in Czechoslovakia. A picture of Akpata as a student leader is feature in this article about African Czechoslovak solidarity. On completing his studies Akpata returned to Nigeria in 1953.

== Political activity in Ghana ==
In 1960 due to difficulties he was experiencing in his native Nigeria because of left-leaning views, Akpata was invited to work as a political adviser to Nkrumah, who by now was President of Ghana. Akpata was stationed at the Kwame Nkrumah Ideological Institute, Winneba, in the central region of Ghana, an establishment that was set up in 1961 to train and educate and African freedom fighters and politicians of the future. Described as "one of Kwame Nkrumah's kingpins" Akpata spoke about the challenges facing Ghana and Africa in the early days of independence in a television interview with ITN in 1964.

In March 1964, seven years after Ghana's independence, Akpata attended the launch of Nkrumah's philosophical book, Consciencism at the University of Ghana at which he said:

The task of philosophers has always been to enrich the understanding and to generalise its conclusions. This is precisely what Kwame Nkrumah has done in his Philosophical Consciencism. The measure of his great achievement is the extent to which he has succeeded in expressing the philosophical generalisations of past historical epochs with his own philosophical beliefs, with the totality of the social, political and scientific knowledge now available.

Following the unexpected death of Wallace-Johnson in a car crash in Ghana in May 1965, Akpata wrote a tribute which appeared in The African Communist, a quarterly journal, in honour of his long time comrade and friend.

Dr. Bankole Akpata wrote and published a large volume of articles and other scholarly

works in the late sixties and early seventies.

He passed on in January, 1974, at 53, in Port-Harcourt, Nigeria.
