= Sylvia Blyden =

Sierra Leonean news publisher

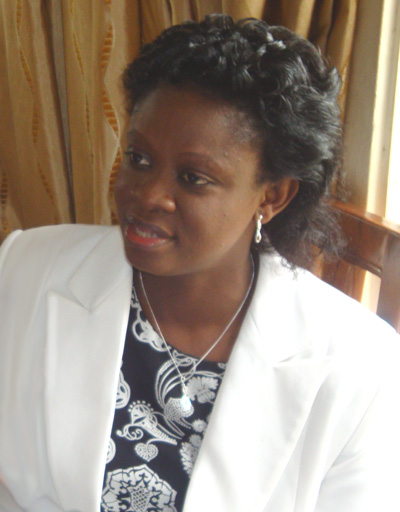

Sierra Leone minister of Social Welfare, Gender and Children Affairs
- In office 2016–2017
- President: Ernest Bai Koroma

Special Executive Assistant to Sierra Leone president Ernest Bai Koroma
- In office 2013–2015

Personal details
- Born: Sylvia Olayinka Walmina Oreshola Blyden; 1 October 1971 (age 54) Freetown, Sierra Leone
- Party: All People's Congress (APC)
- Education: Fourah Bay College
- Profession: Journalist

Sylvia Olayinka Walmina Oreshola Blyden (born 1 October 1971 in Freetown, Sierra Leone) is a Sierra Leonean journalist, political commentator, newspaper publisher, and former Sierra Leone minister of Social Welfare, Gender and Children Affairs under erstwhile President Ernest Bai-Koroma from 2016 to 2017. She served as Special Executive Assistant to Sierra Leone's former president Ernest Bai Koroma from 2013 to 2015.

Blyden is the founder, CEO, and publisher of Sierra Leonean newspaper Awerness Times. She is the only female news publisher in Sierra Leone, and "one of the most recognisable names in the country." She has spoken of her interest to eventually run for the presidency of Sierra Leone.

Born and raised in the capital Freetown, into a prominent political family, Blyden is widely considered one of the most powerful and highly influential female political figures in Sierra Leone. She was a close ally of Sierra Leone's former president Ernest Bai Koroma, and a prominent supporter and public defender of Koroma's presidency.

Blyden is a Christian and a member of the Creole ethnic group. Blyden is the great-great-granddaughter of Edward Wilmot Blyden, the "father of Pan-Africanism". Her maternal grandfather is a Sierra Leonean politician Solomon A. J. Pratt, and her paternal grandfather is the late Sierra Leonean diplomat Edward Wilmot Blyden III.

== Biography ==
Sylvia Olayinka Walmina Oreshola Blyden was born on 1 October 1971 in Freetown, Sierra Leone, to Creole parents. She entered the Annie Walsh School with the best Selective Entrance results of entrants in 1982 and left with the best GCE O'Levels for the school in 1987; she was to graduate with the best BSc results from Medical School in 1993 and again graduate with proficiency in 1996 with an M.D in Medicine during which period she emerged as Sierra Leone's first woman to be elected as University students' leader in 1994.

Blyden is the great-great-granddaughter of Edward Wilmot Blyden, the "father of Pan-Africanism". Her maternal grandfather was the Sierra Leonean politician Solomon A. J. Pratt, and her paternal grandfather was the late Sierra Leonean diplomat Edward Wilmot Blyden III.

== Career ==
A Child-Appointed International Goodwill Ambassador for Sierra Leone's Children, Sylvia Blyden has been a Youths and Women's Rights Activist. She represented Sierra Leone's Female Youths in Beijing during the 1995 United Nations Women's Confab, and was chosen by her African peers to deliver the Female Youths of Africa Speech on 11 August 1995.

In early 2002, she became Sierra Leone's youngest National Political Party Leader at the age of 30, and the third Sierra Leone woman to lead a fully registered political party (the first being Presidential Candidate, the late Mrs. Jeridine Williams-Sarho in 1996).

== Founded own newspaper ==
Following her 24-Hours Internet Cafes, she launched a news media in 2005 known as Awareness Times, which is generally considered critical of the excesses of Government and State Institutions including the President, Ernest Bai Koroma.

== Awards and honours ==
Blyden remains the youngest ever Sierra Leonean to be nationally honoured with an Officer of the Rokel insignia in recognition of her meritorious service to the Nation, on 27 April 2007 Independence Day.
