= 1962 Sierra Leonean general election =

General elections were held in Sierra Leone on 25 May 1962, just over a year after the country gained independence from the United Kingdom. This was the first to be held under universal suffrage. The elections were won by the ruling Sierra Leone People's Party (SLPP), although the party received fewer votes than independent candidates. SLPP leader Milton Margai remained Prime Minister.

== Campaign ==
A total of 216 candidates contested the 62 seats, of which seven were won unopposed; four by the SLPP, two by the All People's Congress (APC) and one by an independent one. The SLPP nominated 59 candidates, the APC 32 and the Sierra Leone Progressive Independence Movement and the United Progressive Party four each. The other 117 candidates were independents.

== Results ==
Party	Votes	%	Seats	+/–
Sierra Leone People's Party	230,118	34.67	28	+4
All People's Congress	114,333	17.23	16	New
Sierra Leone Progressive Independence Movement	34,839	5.25	4	New
United Progressive Party	1,660	0.25	0	−5
Independents	282,724	42.60	14	+4
Paramount chiefs			12	0
Total	663,674	100.00	74	+13
Source: Nohlen et al.
