= Trade unions in Sierra Leone =

- National organization(s): SLLC
- Regulatory authority: Ministry of Labour and Social Security
- Primary legislation: Employment Act 2023
- Total union membership: 354,747 (2022)
- Trade union density: 13% (2022)

Global Rights Index
- 4 Systematic violations of rights

International Labour Organization
- Sierra Leone is a member of the ILO

Convention ratification
- Freedom of Association: 15 June 1961
- Right to Organise: 13 June 1961

Trade unions in Sierra Leone first emerged in the period around World War I, with reports indicating that civil servants organised unions as early as 1912. The Railway Workers Union was founded in 1919. In the late 1930s, trade unions affiliated to the Youth League formed the Trade Union Congress (TUC) to coordinate actions within the labour movement. In 1940, trade unions were legalised. In 1946 tripartite bargaining councils were established that incorporated trade unions for minimum wage and sectoral bargaining with employers. The Sierra Leone Labour Congress (SLLC) was founded in 1976. Although the country's civil war at the end of the 20th Century had a devastating effect on the labour movement, unions played an important role in nonviolent resistance, launching a national strike in the immediate aftermath of the 1997 coup by the Armed Forces Revolutionary Council. Since the end of the civil war, trade unionism in the informal sector has grown.

== Existing unions ==
Collective Bargaining Agreements - Formal Sector (2022)
	Members	CBAs	CBA coverage
Artisans Public Works of Services Employees Union	2,600	6	12,000
Clerical Banking Insurance Accounting Petroleum Union	3,010	7	15,000
Construction Workers Union	2,500	1	8,000
Electricity Employees Union	2,200	1	20,000
Hotel Food Drinks Tobacco Entertainment Workers Unions	580	2	14,000
Union of Mass Media, Financial Institutions, Chemical Industries & General Workers	1,500	2	13,000
Maritime & Waterfront Workers Union	1,500	2	13,000
Municipal & General Government Employees Union	1,000	2	3,000
National Union of Civil Servants	1,500	1	8,000
National Union of Forestry & Agricultural Workers	1,500	3	8,000
Sierra Leone Fishermen's Union	1,600	1	3,000
Sierra Leone Dockworkers Union	1,500	1	4,000
Sierra Leone Health Services Union	4,000	1	16,000
Sierra Leone National Seamen's Union	1,550	1	1,500
Sierra Leone Teachers’ Union	36,000	1	40,000
Sierra Leone Union of Postal & Telecommunications Employees Union	1,054	1	2,500
Sierra Leone Reporter Union	450	–	–
Sierra Leone Union of Security, Watchmen & General Workers	3,200	2	5,000
Skilled & Manual Productive Workers Union	810	4	1,300
United Mine Workers Union	1,602	1	6,000
Union of Railway Plantation, Minerals, Industry & Construction	300	1	1,000
Sierra Leone Port Authority Senior Staff Association	82	–	–

Collective Bargaining Agreements - Informal Sector (2022)
	Members	CBAs	CBA coverage
Indigenous Petty Traders Association	55,000	–	–
Indigenous Photographers’ Union	1,000	–	–
Sierra Leone Artisanal Fishermen's Union	17,106	–	–
Sierra Leone Traders Union	105,000	–	–
Sierra Leone Musicians Union	500	–	–
Sierra Leone Bike Riders Union	120,000	–	–
Motor Drivers & General Transport Workers Union	50,000	1	1,000
Union of Timber Factory Owners & Workers	1,237	–	–
Sierra Leone Commercial Tricycle Riders Union	700	–	–
Sierra Leone Technicians Union	700	–	–
Home and General Workers Union	1,500	–	–
Omolankay Whellbarrow & Porters Union	1,000	–	–
