= Ivor Cummings =

British civil servant (1913–1992)

Ivor Cummings OBE
- Born: Ivor Gustavus Cummings; 10 December 1913; West Hartlepool, England
- Died: 17 October 1992 (aged 78); London, England
- Education: Dulwich College
- Occupation: Civil servant
- Known for: First black official in the British Colonial Office

Ivor Gustavus Cummings (10 December 1913 – 17 October 1992) was a British civil servant of Sierra Leonean ancestry. In 1941, he became the first black official in the British Colonial Office. He has been dubbed the "gay father of the Windrush generation".

== Life ==
Ivor Cummings was born in West Hartlepool, England, on 10 December 1913. His father, Ishmael Cummings, the son of a wealthy merchant from Sierra Leone, was a doctor. His mother, Johanna Archer, was an English nurse. The couple had met when working together at the Royal Victoria Infirmary. Ivor Cummings grew up with his mother in Addiscombe, where the family befriended the widow of the composer Samuel Coleridge-Taylor, to whom they were related by marriage. After being bullied at Whitgift School, Ivor tried joining his father in Freetown. However, feeling an outsider there, he returned to England, where he showed academic strength at Dulwich College.

The family did not have funds to support Cummings training as a doctor. After briefly working in Freetown as a clerk for the United Africa Company, he returned to England looking for medical scholarships. Abandoning those plans, in 1935 he became warden of Aggrey House, a government-run centre for colonial students, arranging meetings, lectures, dances and social events there. There was competition between Aggrey House and the hostel of the West African Students' Union (WASU). In August 1937, Cummings even informed the police that two Aggrey residents had taken girls to spend the night at the WASU hostel. Aggrey House closed in 1940, after reports that communists had come to dominate the House Committee and that one student had brought a sex worker into the hostel.

Cummings himself enjoyed London's 1930s night life, as a gay member of "the group", a set of African intellectuals in London that included the American singer John Payne and the British composer Reginald Foresythe. Cummings joined the Colonial Office in 1941, and by 1942 its new public relations office was heralding his appointment as evidence against the existence of racial discrimination in Britain. He served as secretary of a new Advisory Committee on the Welfare of Colonial Peoples in the United Kingdom, a Colonial Office initiative to assume direct responsibility for housing colonial students. After the war, he worked to recruit African nurses for the National Health Service.

In 1947, Cummings visited Lagos, Nigeria, on official business. When the Greek proprietor of the Bristol Hotel there refused him a room because of his race, the scandal hit the British press.

Cummings was awarded the OBE in the 1948 Birthday Honours. In June 1948, he was the Colonial Office's official representative who met the West Indian immigrants arriving on the HMT Empire Windrush, the beginning of the Windrush generation, helping them to find accommodation and jobs. His choice of a former air-raid shelter beneath Clapham Common as temporary accommodation for Windrush arrivals lacking prearranged accommodation resulted in Brixton becoming a permanent centre for the African Caribbean community in Britain.

Cummings visited the United States on a fellowship, co-authoring a survey of colonial students. He was invited to become Colonial Secretary in Trinidad, but in 1958 resigned from the Colonial Office to work for Kwame Nkrumah, training diplomats in post-independence Ghana. He was posted to the Ghana High Commission in London to recruit West Indian professionals, including Ulric Cross. Cummings later worked as a training officer for Yengema Diamond Mines in Sierra Leone, and as a public relations adviser to the London-based distillers Duncan, Gilbey and Matheson.

Cummings died of cancer in Westminster Hospital, on 17 October 1992, aged 78.
