= Blyden =

Blyden is a surname. Notable people with the surname include:

- Edward Wilmot Blyden (1832–1912), Liberian educator, writer, diplomat, and politician
- Larry Blyden (1925–1975), American actor, stage producer and director, and game show host
- Marvin A. Blyden, American Virgin Islander politician
- Sylvia Blyden (born 1971), Sierra Leonean journalist
