= Democratic People's Congress =

Political party in Sierra Leone

Democratic People's Congress was a political party in Sierra Leone. It was founded in July 1965, by remaining elements of the Sierra Leone Progressive Independence Movement in Kono. DPC consisted of a generation of younger former SLPIM cadres. By the end of July DPC declared that it would work in alliance with the All People's Congress.

In the 1967 elections the APC-DPC coalition defeated the ruling Sierra Leone People's Party. In the Kono North-East constituency, the SLPP had the DPC candidate S. G. M. Fania disqualified on the ground that he was serving a 12-month jail sentence (for political crimes). However, Fania contested his disqualification and a by-election was held in which Fania defeated the SLPP candidate T. R. Beinda. The election campaign in the area was sometimes violent, with clashes between APC/DPC and SLPP supporters. Later, DPC merged with APC.
