= Kono Progressive Movement =

Kono Progressive Movement was a political party in Kono, Sierra Leone, that emerged in the mid-1950s with the backdrop of the expansion of diamond mining activities there are the growing feeling amongst a section of the Kono people that they were not reaping the benefits of the diamond boom. KPM was led by Tamba Sungu Mbriwa. The movement became part of the political opposition, as there was a break between it and the ruling Sierra Leone People's Party only a few months after the founding of KPM. Prominent figures in the area, such as Tamba Ngegba, J.S. Kpakiwa and T.R. Foyoh.

Kono Mannda was the weekly newspaper of the party.

The KPM was the only party-like organisation to emerge in rural Sierra Leone at the time.

KPM contested two parliamentary seats in the 1957 elections. T.S. Mbriwa contested one of them, and won. In the other seat contested by KPM, the KPM candidate A.A. Mani was defeated by the SLPP candidate Paul Dunbar by a margin of 3105 to 3061 votes. However, since Dunbar was later disqualified on grounds of corruption, a by-election was held. In the by-election A.A. Mani defeated Dunbar's wife.

In September 1958, KPM merged with the small Freetown-based Sierra Leone Independence Movement, forming the Sierra Leone Progressive Independence Movement.
