= National Council of Sierra Leone =

The National Council of Sierra Leone was the main opposition party in Sierra Leone in the early 1950s.

The organisation was founded by former members of the Sierra Leonean branch of the National Congress of British West Africa around Herbert Bankole-Bright and Isaac Wallace-Johnson in 1950. It gained much of its support from the Creole people and some Oku people of the Freetown colony.

Initially, some proposed that the group be named the "Ogboni Society", but it instead took the name National Council of the Colony of Sierra Leone, later shortened to "National Council of Sierra Leone".

The National Council stood in opposition to the Stevenson Constitution of 1947, instead calling for a federal state, with the colony and the protectorate having separate assemblies.

In the 1951 elections, it initially appeared that the National Council had won more seats than the Sierra Leone People's Party (SLPP). However, all the independent members from the protectorate later declared for the SLPP, placing the National Council a distant second. It became the main opposition. When the SLPP failed to act on the constitution issue, the Council attempted to block all government business.

The group also organised protests over the constitution. The Positive Action Group faction led by Otto During attempted to instigated legal action against the Governor of Sierra Leone, claiming that the imposition of the constitution was itself unconstitutional.

In 1954, Wallace-Johnson split away to found the United Sierra Leone Progressive Party. The National Council lost all of its seats at the 1957 election, slumping to only 1.8% of the votes cast. The main opposition became Wallace-Johnson's group. Bankole-Bright died the following year, and the party appears to have collapsed.
