= 1951 Sierra Leonean general election =

General elections were held in Sierra Leone Colony and Protectorate in November 1951.

== Electoral system ==
The 1947 constitution expanded the Legislative Council to 35 members, of which seven were government officials, seven were appointed Europeans, fourteen were Africans indirectly elected from the Protectorate (ten from District Councils and two from the Protectorate Assembly) and seven were Africans directly elected from the Colony. Around 5,000 people were registered to vote.

== Campaign ==
Only five of the seven directly-elected constituencies were contested, with candidates running unopposed in two of the rural constituencies.

== Results ==
The National Council (NCSL) won three of the seven elected seats, and the Sierra Leone People's Party (SLPP) two. However, the SLPP gained the support of the indirectly elected protectorate representatives.

A total of 3,276 votes were cast; 2,438 in the three Freetown constituencies and 838 (550 and 288) in the two contested rural constituencies.

Party	Votes	%	Seats
National Council			3
Sierra Leone People's Party			2
Independents			2
Indirectly-elected members			14
Appointed members			7
Government officials			7
Total			35
Total votes	3,726	–	
Source: Wyse, Sternberger et al.

=== Elected members ===
Party	Elected member
Directly-elected
National Council	Herbert Bankole-Bright
National Council	C M A Thompson
National Council	J Rogers Williams
Sierra Leone People's Party	A G Randle
Sierra Leone People's Party	M S Mustapha
Independents	I. T. A. Wallace-Johnson
Independents	J C O Crowther
Indirectly-elected
Bo District	R B S Koker
Bonthe District	Milton Margai
Bombali District	Bai Farima Tass II
Kailahum District	Bokari Sambi of Daru
Kenema District	Kenewa Gamanga
Moyamba District	W H Fitzjohn
Port Loko District	Alkali Modu III
Pujehun District	Jaia Kaikai
Tonkolili District	Bai Kurr
Protectorate Assembly	Siaka Stevens
Protectorate Assembly	Albert Margai
Source: Wyse

== Aftermath ==
The SLPP's Milton Margai was appointed Chief Minister in 1953.
