= Edward Wilmot Blyden III =

Sierra Leonean diplomat (1918–2010)

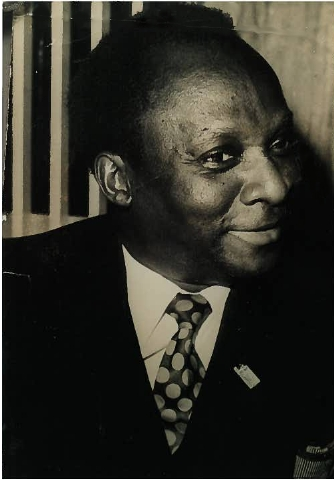

Special Adviser to the President
- In office 1976–1980
- President: Siaka Stevens

Sierra Leone Ambassador to The United Nations
- In office 1974–1976

Sierra Leone Ambassador to Soviet Union, Warsaw Pact
- In office 1971–1974

Personal details
- Born: Edward Wilmot Abioseh Blyden-Taylor; 19 May 1918 Freetown, Sierra Leone Protectorate
- Died: 10 October 2010 (aged 92) Freetown, Sierra Leone
- Spouse: Prof. Amelia Elizabeth Blyden (née Kendrick)
- Children: 8
- Relatives: Edward Wilmot Blyden (grandfather)
- Education: Fourah Bay College; Lincoln University; Harvard University
- Profession: Diplomat, political scientist, orator

Edward Wilmot Blyden III (19 May 1918 – 10 October 2010) was a diplomat, political scientist and educator born in Freetown Sierra Leone Protectorate. He distinguished himself as an educator and contributor to post-colonial discourse on African self-government, and Third World non-alignment. He was the grandson of Edward Wilmot Blyden.

== Early years ==
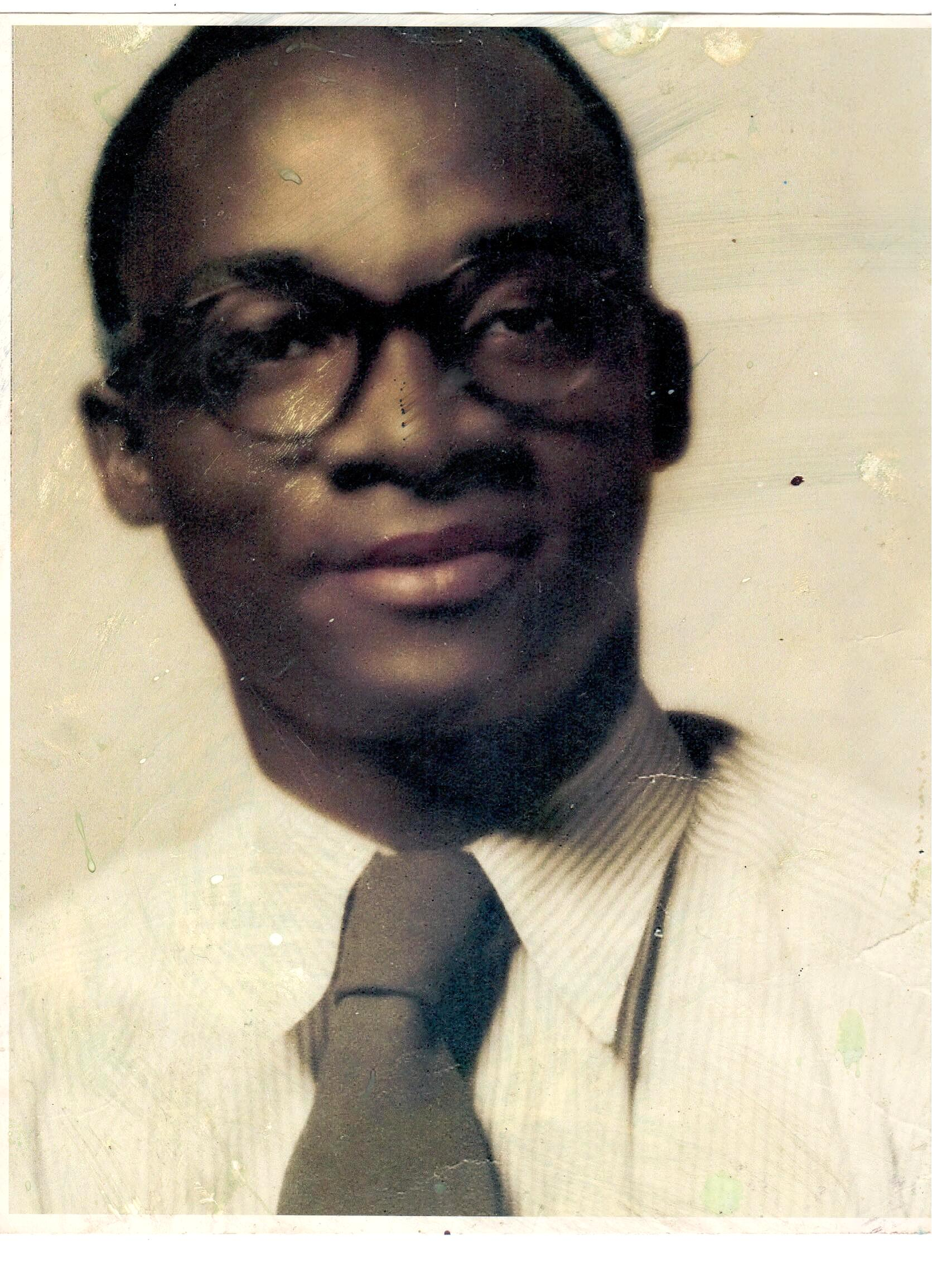
Blyden in his student years

Edward Wilmot Blyden III was born Edward Wilmot Abioseh Blyden-Taylor on 19 May 1918, to Isa Cleopatra Blyden and Joseph Ravensburg Taylor, a Creole, in the "Baimbrace" neighbourhood of Freetown. As an infant, he suffered the effects of rickets brought on by malnutrition in the wake of the 1918–19 Spanish flu pandemic. While this affected his ability to walk in early childhood, it was not a lasting disability. Edward and his sister Amina were raised by their mother, Isa Cleopatra Blyden and their Liberian grandmother, Anna Espadon Erskine, who were both headmistresses of primary schools in the Muslim communities of Foulah Town and Fourah Bay, even though the family were active members of the Zion Methodist Church, Wilberforce Street. He attended the Ebenezer Amalgamated Primary School.

He attended the Wesleyan Methodist Boys High School and, after graduating, matriculated at Fourah Bay College. He worked as a teacher and briefly for the Sierra Leone Railway during the early 1940s. His earliest published essays on African education and colonialism date back to these years.

== Student years in America ==
Blyden with Edith Holden

After the Second World War, Blyden, was invited to continue his education at Lincoln University (Pennsylvania) in the United States where his grandfather had received an honorary doctorate. He graduated from Lincoln in 1948 with an A.B. degree, and matriculated at Harvard University, where he earned M.A., MEd degrees in Education and began research for a PhD in Political Science. The subject of his doctoral thesis was the pattern of constitutional change and emergence of African political thought in the twentieth century.

During this period, he met Edith Holden, granddaughter of John Pray Knox with whom Blyden's family had longstanding historical connections and with whom he later worked on the definitive biography of his grandfather Edward Wilmot Blyden. In 1950, he met and married Amelia Elizabeth Kendrick a native of Worcester, Massachusetts, and a graduate of Boston University.

== Politics and the Sierra Leone Independence Movement ==
Blyden interrupted his graduate studies in 1954 to return to Sierra Leone, where he took up a position as head of Extra Mural Studies at Fourah Bay College. He became increasingly active in the politics of independence and after a sensational series of Town-Hall lectures, he formed the Sierra Leone Independence Movement in 1957. Promoting the view that a newly independent Sierra Leone would not be well served by the fractious nature of party politics, he galvanised his followers with the Movement's signature call and response: "What's the Word? SLIM!"

Prominent supporters of SLIM included regional and international Pan-Africanists such as Nnamdi Azikiwe, Kwame Nkrumah, George Padmore, Eric Williams, Julius Nyerere and John Henrik Clark who viewed the progress towards independence in Sierra Leone as part of a wider effort to forge an independent West Africa united by the same socio-political principles. In 1957, Blyden and Paramount Chief and Member of Parliament Tamba Songou Mbriwa of Fiama Chiefdom, Kono District, lodged a formal protest at the Colonial Office in London against the illicit exploitation of Sierra Leone's diamonds, demanding a Royal Commission of Enquiry into serious riots in the Kono District. In the pre-elections of 1957, SLIM won no seats which disappointed Blyden and his supporters within and without the country. Blyden and Mbriwa went on to form an alliance, merging their parties to form the Sierra Leone Progressive Independence Movement (SLPIM)

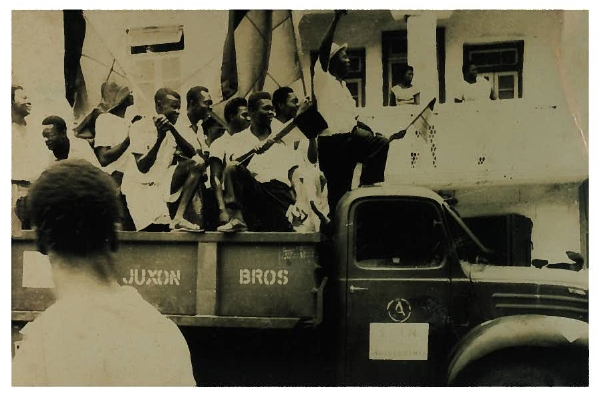
Blyden and supporters campaigning for SLIM

At the eve of independence, a West Africa Correspondent's Report summed up Blyden and SLIM's impact on pre-independence politics as follows:

If the news that all Sierra Leone parties have formed a National front to greet Independence means what if seems to, prospects are better than ever they were... A man to whom the country owes an apology if this moment of concord holds is E. W. Blyden, III. He argued with considerable vigour and wit that the country was not ripe for party politics and it was in this faith that he created the officially 'non-party' Sierra Leone Independence Movement. He lately took his doctorate at Harvard after retiring discomfited from active politics. It is improbable, however that this interminable monologuist, whom the Vanguard saluted ironically on his departure for trying to teach a country politics by the book will receive any acclaim from the hard-bitten realists who have now joined together. I told you so makes few friends.

== Academic years in West Africa ==
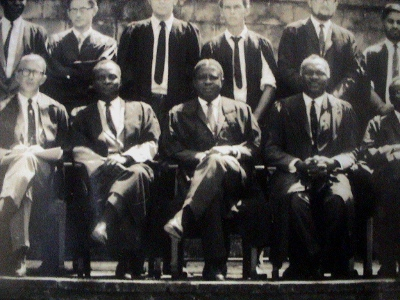
Blyden and senior academics at Fourah Bay College

In 1960, Blyden was invited by Nnamdi Azikiwe to help build the University of Nigeria, Nsukka, where he established the Department of Political Science and Diplomacy and the Department of African Studies. He was Dean of Faculties but made his most lasting impact on a generation of West Africans as the University Public Orator. Blyden was able to expose the student body to a wide spectrum of international scholars, including William Leo Hansberry, Arnold Toynbee, Basil Davidson, Leopold Senghor and others.

At the outbreak of the Nigerian Civil War in 1966, Blyden and his family moved to Freetown, where he became Dean of the Faculty of Arts, and Director of African studies at Fourah Bay College (the University of Sierra Leone). First and foremost, Blyden considered himself a teacher, and strove to imbue a generation of bright young men and women with the knowledge, principles and self-confidence needed to guide Africa in a Post-Colonial world. The careers of notable Africans such as Peter Onu, James Jonah and others whom he taught or mentored are testament to his success.

== Non-Alignment and Cold War diplomacy ==
Blyden was a first-hand observer and participant at many key events that would shape the geopolitics in the second half-of the 20th Century. Under the auspices of Harvard University, he was a student observer at the Treaty of San Francisco that formally ended World War II. He toured Asian and Far Eastern Universities as a visiting lecturer, coming in contact with intellectuals involved in Asian independence struggles. In 1954 he was the sole delegate from colonial Sierra Leone to the Eighth General Assembly of UNESCO in Montevideo, Uruguay.

Blyden at the 1954 UNESCO General Assembly in Uruguay

Thus by the mid-1950s, Blyden's African perspective on post-colonial nationhood and self-determination was widely known and respected among Africans and Asians seeking to define the roles of post-colonial nations on the world stage. At the 1962 conference on international politics billed New Nations in a Divided World: The international relations of Afro-Asian states, Blyden presented the paper "African Neutralism and Non Alignment". The conference organizers would ultimately publish the conference proceedings in a book of the same name (New York: Praeger) edited by Kurt London, with the following commentary:

Of all current political and ideological concepts, few have stirred more controversy than that of non-alignment-- the doctrine devised by those Afro-Asian leaders who are seeking a 'third way' in the East-West struggle. Their unwillingness to align themselves with either of the two great power blocks now confronting each other cannot fail to have enormous and far-reaching effects – now and in the future – upon the shape of the world.

The publisher went on to say:

To explore the impact of non-alignment on a divided world, sixty scholars from twenty-two countries of Africa, Asia, Australia, Europe, and North America recently assembled in Athens, Greece, for the Fourth International Conference on World Politics. From the papers submitted at the conference, Kurt London, Director of the Institute for Sino-Soviet Studies at the George Washington University and one of the chief organizers of the conference, selected twenty of the most provocative contributions for this volume. Among them are essays by such distinguished authorities as Edward Blyden III, Jane Degras, Herbert Dinerstein, Rupert Emerson, Walter Laqueur, Choh-Ming Li, and Richard Löwenthal. In Part I, questions of colonialism and Communism predominate – for example, the Communist attitudes toward colonialism, neo-colonialism, and neutrality discussed from the points of view of both Westerners and Afro-Asians. In Part II, which concerns itself with the new nations in transition, specific problems are taken up – among them, the role of the intelligentsia in the new countries and the idea of African neutralism and non-alignment. In Part III, the focus shifts to Communist policies in non-aligned countries

— including Soviet economic policies toward the Afro-Asian countries and the motives and operations of Communist China's foreign policy.

In his contribution, Blyden reviewed the history and origin of African ideas on neutralism and non-alignment from James Aggrey and J. E. Casely Hayford, through Nnamdi Azikiwe and Kwame Nkrumah to the Bandung Conference. Blyden summarised the primacy of Africanism in the policy-making of newly independent nations:

A point that may be obvious but can hardly be overstated in any assessment of African Policies of non-alignment is that African political leaderships do not conceive of their policies as Eastern or Western, but as African. Africanism is the touchstone of the policy-maker in the new African states. It is noteworthy in this regard that serious writers on Africa have been struck by the pervasiveness of the pan-African impulse in contemporary African politics. Leading students like Padmore, Shepperson, Fyfe, Hargreaves, and Dike have been unanimous in pointing to an intimate interconnection between the ideas of pan-Africanism and African neutralism and non-alignment.

In 1971, Blyden was again given the chance to put the ideas on which he had built his academic and political careers into practice. Under the presidency of Siaka Stevens, Blyden was appointed Ambassador Extraordinary and Plenipotentiary from Sierra Leone to the Soviet Union, and accredited to Romania, Poland, Yugoslavia, Bulgaria, Czechoslovakia and Hungary. During his first visit to the Soviet Ministry of Foreign Affairs to schedule a date for official presentation of his credentials, Blyden met Soviet Foreign Minister Andrei Gromyko and reminded him of their first meeting in 1949 at the signing of the Treaty of San Francisco. What followed was an extended conversation which also broke the protocol of conversations through translators: Blyden returned to his embassy to find an official invitation to present his credentials the following morning. On a later visit to Moscow, Blyden would be presented with a biography of his grandfather Edward Wilmot Blyden, published by the Russian Academy of Sciences' Institute of Africa and Asia under the directorship of Anatoly Gromyko.

Another surprise for Blyden was his meeting with former Harvard classmate, Secretary of State Henry Kissinger, during President Richard Nixon's historic 1972 visit to Moscow; both of them now on the world stage. While accredited to Eastern Europe, he orchestrated three successful state visits to Sierra Leone by Marshal Josip Broz Tito of Yugoslavia, Premier Alexei Kosygin of the Soviet Union, and Nicolae Ceaușescu of Romania. Blyden negotiated important agreements between Sierra Leone and Warsaw Pact Countries for trade and development projects in Sierra Leone.

From 1974 to 1976, he served as Sierra Leone's Permanent Representative to the United Nations, where he was Chairman of the United Nations Special Committee on Decolonization. He was an influential voice of reason in the infamous *Zionism is racism* debate that led to the United Nations General Assembly Resolution 3379 of 1975, placing Sierra Leone at the center of efforts to table the motion and presenting an Africanist perspective on Zionism first elaborated by his own grandfather in 1898.

On his return from the UN, Blyden served as Special Adviser to the President, and played an active role during the 1980 OAU Summit in Sierra Leone, at which he was awarded the United Nations Peace Medal by the visiting U.N. Secretary General.

== Retirement years ==
He received honorary degrees from the University of Nigeria, Nsukka, and Lincoln University. He gave the keynote speech at the 100th Anniversary of the University of Liberia (formerly Liberia College), an institution at which his grandfather Edward Wilmot Blyden had been a founding Professor. Though much of his career was spent outside of Sierra Leone, Blyden remained deeply attached to the cultural life of his native Freetown. He was a member of the Zion Methodist Church of Wilberforce St. and an important patriarchal figure in the Muslim communities of Fullah Town and Fourah Bay. He was a Freemason and former Grand Master. He was an honorary member of the Akamori Hunting Society. Blyden's character and its lasting impression has been succinctly summarised by the anthropologist Joseph Opala:

He was a man of strong opinions, and he was never shy to voice them. And because he combined a vast amount of knowledge with his opinions, you couldn't forget a conversation with him.

== Family ==
Edward Blyden was married to Dr. Amelia Elizabeth Blyden, née Kendrick (1928–2020). The couple had eight children: Edward Walter Babatunde Blyden, a businessman; Isa Jeanette Blyden, a Russian philologist and freelance radio journalist; Bai-Bureh Kendrick Blyden, a Power engineer and engineering consultant; Dr. Fenda Aminata Akiwumi, an assistant professor of environmental geographer and hydrogeologist; Henrietta Cleopatra Blyden, an ESL teacher and freelance writer; Dr. Eluemuno Richard Blyden, a biotechnologist, business-owner and Adviser to the Government of Sierra Leone; Edward Katib Blyden, of ChefBlyden.com; and Dr. Nemata Amelia Blyden-Bickersteth, an Associate Professor of African and African Diasporan History at George Washington University.

== Selected writings and speeches ==
- Blyden, Edward W., "The Need for Mass Education in Sierra Leone" (a review essay in Memorandum on the Education of African Communities), in West Africa (London), January 1940 (under pseudonym Adjai Onike).
- Blyden, Edward W., "The Rise and Growth of African Statesmanship: From the Mid-Fifteenth Century to the Present", in Statesmanship in Africa, special supplement to Civilizations, Winter 1953.
- Blyden III, Edward W. "The Idea of African 'Neutralism' and 'Non-Alignment': An Exploratory Survey", in K. L. London (ed.), New Nations in a Divided World. New York & London: Praeger, 1963.
- Blyden, Edward Wilmot Abiòsu Sierra Leone: the pattern of constitutional change, 1924–1951.
