= Ladipo Solanke =

Nigerian activist (1886–1958)

- Born: Oladipo Felix Solanke; Abeokuta, Ogun State, Nigeria
- Citizenship: Nigeria
- Education: Fourah Bay College; University College, London
- Occupation: Teaching

Ladipo Solanke (c. 1886 – 2 September 1958) was a political activist born in Nigeria who campaigned on West African issues.

== Biography ==
=== Birth and education ===
Born in Abeokuta, Nigeria, as Oladipo Felix Solanke, he studied at the Fourah Bay College in Sierra Leone before moving to study law at University College, London, in 1922.

In Britain, Solanke joined the Union of Students of African Descent. In 1924, he wrote to West Africa magazine to complain about an article in the Evening News, which had claimed that cannibalism and black magic had been common in Nigeria until recent years. His protest received the support of Amy Ashwood Garvey, who became a close friend, while Solanke began studying British papers for other derogatory reports.

=== Teaching ===
Finding himself living in poverty, Solanke began teaching Yoruba and was annoyed by the lack of interest in traditional Nigerian culture among other Nigerian students in London. In June 1924, he became the first person to broadcast on the radio in Yoruba. The following month, with Garvey's encouragement, Solanke and twelve other students founded the Nigeria Progress Union to promote the welfare of Nigerian students.

In 1925, Solanke and Herbert Bankole-Bright founded the West African Students' Union (WASU) as a social, cultural and political focus for West African students in Britain. Solanke became the organisation's Secretary-General and the main contributor to its journal, Wasu. In 1926, he recorded music in Yoruba for Zonophone, and in 1927, he published United West Africa at the Bar of the Family of Nations, calling for Africans to enjoy universal suffrage. Solanke also led WASU's drive for a hostel for West Africans in London.

=== West Africa ===
In 1929, he left for a fundraising tour of West Africa. He spent three years travelling, his mission was supported by the West Africans and followed by most of the local press. While there, branches of WASU were founded in each country he visited. He also met Opeolu Obisanya, and the couple later married.

=== Return to Britain ===
Solanke returned to Britain with sufficient funds to open the planned hostel, named "Africa House", and became its first warden. However, he faced serious criticism from some WASU members over alleged extravagant spending while in Africa.

During the 1930s and 40s, Solanke was able to use his friendships with figures including Marcus Garvey, Paul Robeson, Reginald Sorensen and Nathaniel Fadipe to further the causes of West African unity and anti-racism, raising the profile of WASU. When cocoa farmers in the Gold Coast tried to break a cartel of British companies, they wrote to Solanke personally to gain his assistance, and he was able to organise a large campaign in Britain, including questions in Parliament.

In 1944, Solanke returned to West Africa to raise funds for a new hostel, and did not return to Britain until 1948. The trip again proved a success, but in his absence, WASU had increasingly come under the influence of Kwame Nkrumah and then Joe Appiah. Faced with internal dissent, Solanke stepped down as Secretary-General in 1949, to campaign against communist influence in the union. His efforts to organise a slate of anti-communist candidates to contest the elections to the WASU executive in 1951 proved unsuccessful, and in January 1953 he finally split with the union after it decided to close Africa House, due to financial pressures. Solanke maintained the hostel with his own dwindling funds, until his death from lung cancer in London in September 1958.
