= West African National Secretariat =

Pan-Africanist organisation founded by Kwame Nkrumah

The West African National Secretariat (WANS) was a Pan-Africanist organisation based in Britain.

It was founded in December 1945 by Bankole Awoonor-Renner (elected President), Kwame Nkrumah (elected Secretary-General), I. T. A. Wallace-Johnson (elected as Chairman), Bankole Akpata and Kojo Botsio, immediately following the Manchester Pan-African Congress. Many of the initial members of WANS were also members of the West African Students' Union (WASU).

WANS aimed to build a united movement throughout West Africa for independence, on a platform of anti-imperialism. Its view of West Africa was broad, and aimed to include countries as distant as Kenya and Sudan. A major congress was planned, but never came to fruition.

Within WANS, Nkrumah organised a secret socialist revolutionary group, known as "The Circle". This group worked closely with the Communist Party of Great Britain.

During 1946, WANS published five issues of a monthly journal, The New African, containing articles in English, French and Belgian, on West African issues, but also incorporating stories from the Moscow New Times. In September 1946, WANS held a joint conference with WASU, which Nkrumah convinced Léopold Sédar Senghor and Sourou Migan Apithy to attend.

WANS was considerably weakened after Nkrumah returned to Africa in 1947, and appears to have dissolved the following year.
