= Sierra Leone Independence Movement =

Sierra Leone Independence Movement was a Freetown-based political party in Sierra Leone, was founded in 1957. The movement was led by Edward Wilmot Blyden III (grandson of Edward Wilmot Blyden). The party contested four Freetown constituencies in the 1957 election, but did not win any seat.

In September 1958, SLIM merged with the Kono Progressive Movement, forming the Sierra Leone Progressive Independence Movement.
