= List of ambassadors of Sierra Leone to Russia =

Coordinates: 55.745787°N 37.426244°E

The Sierra Leonean Ambassador to Russia is the official representative of the Government of Sierra Leone to the Government of Russia.

== List of representatives ==
Date Designated/Accredited	Name	Sierra Leonean Head of State	Russian/Soviet Head of State	Term end
January 11, 1965	Harrison E. Tucker	Henry Josiah Lightfoot Boston	Leonid Brezhnev	1967
August 7, 1969	de:Ambrose Patrick Genda	Banja Tejan-Sie	Leonid Brezhnev	
1971	Edward Wilmot Blyden III	Siaka Stevens	Leonid Brezhnev	1974
January 20, 1978	Andrew Brima Conteh	Siaka Stevens	Leonid Brezhnev	September 26, 1981
December 18, 1982	Eya Etoam M'Bayo	Siaka Stevens	Leonid Brezhnev	
May 12, 1984	Sorsoh Ibrahim Conteh	Siaka Stevens	Konstantin Chernenko	
June 27, 1989	Olu William Harding	Joseph Saidu Momoh	Mikhail Gorbachev	1994
1999	Melrose Beyon Kai-banya	Ahmad Tejan Kabbah	Boris Yeltsin	2007
May 2009	Salieu Turay	Ernest Bai Koroma	Vladimir Putin	
September 2010	John Sahr Francis Yambasu	Ernest Bai Koroma	Vladimir Putin	

== See also ==
- List of ambassadors of Russia to Sierra Leone
