= 1957 Sierra Leonean general election =

- May 1957

39 of 51 seats in the Territorial Assembly 20 seats needed for a majority
- Registered: 494,917
- Turnout: 33.44%

	Majority party	Minority party
Leader	Milton Margai	C.B. Rogers-Wright
Party	SLPP	UPP
Leader's seat	Bonthe South	Freetwon Central (defeated)
Seats won	24	5
Popular vote	75,575	20,935
Percentage	46.13%	12.78%
- Results by constituency

General elections were held in Sierra Leone Colony and Protectorate in May 1957. A total of 39 seats were up for election, whilst another 12 paramount chiefs were indirectly elected.

The Sierra Leone People's Party led by Milton Margai won a majority of the elected seats, and gained the support of all 12 chiefs and eight of the ten independents. Margai led the country to independence in 1961.

== Results ==
Party	Votes	%	Seats
Sierra Leone People's Party	75,575	46.13	24
United Progressive Party	20,935	12.78	5
National Council	2,984	1.82	0
Labour Party	1,128	0.69	0
Sierra Leone Independence Movement	1,126	0.69	0
Independents	62,086	37.90	10
Paramount chiefs			12
Total	163,834	100.00	51
Valid votes	163,834	99.01	
Invalid/blank votes	1,645	0.99	
Total votes	165,479	100.00	
Registered voters/turnout	494,917	33.44	
Source: Nohlen et al.

=== By area ===
Electoral area	SLPP			UPP			NCSL			LP			SLIM			Independents			Total		Registered voters	Turnout
Electoral area	Votes	%	Seats	Votes	%	Seats	Votes	%	Seats	Votes	%	Seats	Votes	%	Seats	Votes	%	Seats	Votes	Seats	Registered voters	Turnout
Colony	17,117		9	10,001		3	2,984		0	1,128		0	1,126		0	3,481		2	35,837	14	53,517	
Protectorate (North)	17,438		6	8,942		2	−	−	−	−	−	−	−	−	−	11,938		2	38,318	10	160,129	
Protectorate (South East)	17,749		2	−	−	−	−	−	−	−	−	−	−	−	−	37,534		4	55,283	6	128,014	
Protectorate (South West)	23,271		8	1,992		0	−	−	−	−	−	−	−	−	−	10,778		1	36,041	9	153,227	
Total	75,575	45.7	25	20,935	12.6	5	2,984	1.8	0	1,128	0.7	0	1,126	0.7	0	62,086	37.5	10	165,479	39	494,917	33.4
Source: Sternberger et al.
