= Sierra Leone Labour Congress =

SLLC
- Sierra Leone Labour Congress
- Founded: 1976
- Headquarters: Freetown, Sierra Leone
- Location: Sierra Leone
- Key people: [M. A. Deen ], President; Kandeh Yilla, General Secretary
- Affiliations: ITUC

The Sierra Leone Labour Congress (SLLC) is a national trade union center in Sierra Leone. It was founded in 1976.

The SLLC is affiliated with the International Trade Union Confederation.

James Baimba Kabia was Secretary General from 1977 to 1981.

== See also ==
- 1926 Sierra Leone railway strike
