= West African Students' Union =

London association of students from West Africa

The West African Students' Union (WASU), founded in London, England, in 1925 and active into the 1960s, was an association of students from various West African countries who were studying in the United Kingdom.

== Origins ==
WASU was founded on 7 August 1925 by twenty-one law students, led by Ladipo Solanke and Herbert Bankole-Bright. Solanke had founded the Nigerian Progress Union (NPU), for London-based students with a Nigerian background, the previous year. With the support of Amy Ashwood Garvey, it had begun to campaign for improved welfare for all African students in London, and for assorted measures for progress in Britain's African colonies.

As early as 1923, Solanke had proposed that the Union of Students of African Descent (USAD), a Christian social organisation dominated by students from the West Indies (and which had grown out of the earlier West African and West Indian Christian Union, founded in 1917), should incorporate itself into the National Congress of British West Africa (NCBWA). In 1925, Bankole-Bright of the NCBWA called on USAD, the NPU, the African Progress Union and the Gold Coast Students' Association (GCSA) to join together to form a single organisation for West African students, inspired by the Indian Students' Union. Many students joined together to form WASU, and Solanke became the new organisation's secretary-general, while J. B. Danquah became its first president. J. E. Casely Hayford was the new grouping's first patron, which post he used to promote African nationalism.

The new organisation made opposition to the colour bar its first priority, while also including the promotion of political research, support for the NCBWA and the provision of a student hostel in its founding aims.

WASU began publication of a journal, Wasu, in March 1926. Solanke and Julius Ojo-Cole wrote the majority of articles in what was intended as a scholarly publication, circulated both in Europe and Africa.

The aim of founding a hostel was taken directly from USAD and the NPU. Many African students in Britain found that, due to racism, it was difficult to secure satisfactory lodgings. While the Colonial Office showed some interest in establishing such a hostel, WASU was keen to maintain control of the project, and in 1929, Solanke left for a fundraising journey through West Africa. Despite this, the Colonial Office assembled a secret committee to plan for a hostel under its control, and attempted to secure private funding for its construction. This became Aggrey House, which WASU exposed in their pamphlet The Truth About Aggrey House – An Exposure of the Government Plan to Control African Students in Great Britain.

WASU also undertook some political campaigns within Britain. In 1929, it campaigned against an African village exhibition in Newcastle, which it felt would be exploitative. This campaign was taken up in Parliament by Communist Party of Great Britain (CPGB) Member of Parliament Shapurji Saklatvala. During the 1930s, the group developed increasing links with communist groups, such as the League Against Imperialism (LAI) and the Negro Welfare Association, in particular in its campaigns against the colour bar and against the Italian invasion of Ethiopia.

While in Africa, Solanke founded more than twenty branches of WASU, in the Gold Coast, Nigeria, Sierra Leone and the Belgian Congo. While these organisations were short-lived, they formed the initial membership of the Nigerian Youth Movement and the Gold Coast Youth Conference.

== Activities in the 1930s ==
By 1932, when Solanke returned to Britain, Wasu had ceased to appear, and membership had fallen amid disputes between Nigerian and Gold Coast members. However, he had raised sufficient funds to open a hostel in Camden in March 1933 named "Africa House". In addition to providing accommodation for students, the hostel also offered rooms to West African visitors to London, and it housed reference materials on West Africa. The new hostel did nothing to settle the disputes within WASU, and Solanke was accused of wasting money while in Africa, and of attempting to personally control the new lodgings. Almost all the Gold Coast Students' Association (GCSA) members left WASU, and even an intervention by William Ofori Atta was unable to settle matters.

The Colonial Office determined to open a rival hostel, at which political discussion could be monitored and discouraged. WASU opposed the scheme, and formed an "Africa House Defence Committee", including Reginald Bridgeman of the LAI, also gaining the support of the National Council for Civil Liberties and Paul Robeson, who was awarded the title "Babasale of the Union". Aggrey House opened in October 1934, but a WASU-led boycott left it unfilled, until the Colonial Office offered WASU official recognition and financial support to run Africa House. In financial difficulties, WASU accepted the deal, and also accepted funding from organisations such as the United African Company.

In 1937, the Gold Coast Farmers Union wrote to Solanke, asking for his assistance in breaking the cocoa cartel of Cadbury's and the UAC. With Labour Party MPs Reginald Sorensen and Arthur Creech Jones, WASU campaigned in support of the 1938 Gold Coast cocoa hold-up, where small farmers attempted to pressurise the companies by disrupting their supplies. The campaign also convinced most members of the GCSA to rejoin WASU.

In July 1938, with grants from various West African governments and British companies, WASU opened a new hostel, on Camden Square. This also solved the union's financial problems, and enabled it to step up its campaigning activity. WASU became increasingly identified as an anti-colonial group, and it called for dominion status and universal suffrage for the West African colonies. Clement Attlee gave a speech to the union in which he suggested that the Atlantic Charter would apply to all nations, effectively endorsing WASU's aims, but Winston Churchill insisted that self-determination could only apply to European nations.

== Activities in the 1940s ==
In 1942, WASU organised a "West African Parliamentary Committee", chaired by Sorensen. It also published a call for the immediate internal self-government of Britain's West African colonies, to be followed by independence within five years of the end of the war. Harold Macmillan personally visited Africa House to argue the British government's case.

WASU's influence in West Africa again increased, with both the Nigerian Union of Students and the Sierra Leone Students' Union affiliating. WASU also represented the Nigeria Union of Teachers within the UK. With its links to the Nigerian trade union movement, WASU was a significant supporter of the Nigerian general strike of 1945.

In the mid-1940s, Solanke returned to West Africa to undertake further fundraising, with H. O. Davies becoming acting Secretary-General. WASU also affiliated to the World Youth Movement, and in 1946 it held a joint conference with Kwame Nkrumah's West African National Secretariat. This event agreed a platform of anti-imperialism and socialism. Nkrumah also became Vice President of WASU. The following year, WASU called for an immediate decision on independence for the West African colonies, and criticised the Labour government for its failure to deliver this.

== Final years ==
Solanke returned from West Africa at the end of the decade, with sufficient funding for a new hostel to open on the Chelsea Embankment. However, he fell out with WASU's executive, each accusing the other of excessive expenditure, and in 1949 he stepped down from his positions in the group. In the 1951 elections to WASU's executive, he organised an anti-communist slate, which failed to take control from the largely communist leadership of Joe Appiah and Ade Ademola. In 1952, WASU determined to close their Camden hostel, but Solanke instead took control of it.

WASU affiliated to the International Union of Students (IUS) on its foundation, and its members regularly attended the World Festival of Youth. Although the National Union of Students of the United Kingdom left the IUS in 1952, WASU retained its membership.

In 1952, WASU began publication of WASU News Service, as an openly Marxist replacement for Wasu. Following further financial problems, it sold its hostel on the Chelsea Embankment and opened cheaper premises on Warrington Crescent in 1956. The same year, it underwent a major reorganisation and passed a motion disassociating it from all political organisations. In 1958, it joined the Committee of African Organisations and lost importance, but it remained active into the early 1960s. The National Union of Nigerian Students was one of the organisations set up in the wake of the demise of WASU.

== Legacy ==
In 2004 a new West African Students' Union based in Ghana was founded to unite students' unions throughout the region. It describes itself as a formal resuscitation of the earlier organisation.

Also inspired by the original West African Students' Union, The WASU Project aims to document the history of West Africans in Britain, especially those who campaigned for an end to colonial rule and against all forms of racism during the 20th century, by presenting information, photos, and eventually a film about WASU.
