= Solomon Athanasius James Pratt =

Sierra Leonese politician

Solomon Athanasius James Pratt, C.O.R. M.P. M,A. M.Sc. LL.B. B.LJtt, Dip. Agric. Econs., also known as S.A.J. Pratt or Jolliboy, (25 December 1921 – 28 December 2017) was a Sierra Leone Creole politician, lawyer, and agriculturalist who served under the administration of President Siaka Stevens. Described by some commentators as the 'Doyen of Creole politicians', S.A.J. Pratt was one of the few Sierra Leone Creole politicians to serve in both the Margai administrations and the APC government.

== Background ==
Solomon Athanasius James Pratt was born in Bathurst, British Gambia on 25 December 1921 to George Pratt and Christiana Weekes.

== Education ==
S.A.J. Pratt was educated at Regent Primary School and completed academic studies at several higher educational institutions. He graduated with a B.A. (Durham) in 1944 and an M.A. (Durham) in 1948. He earned a B.Sc. (Economics) Hons at London University and completed his studies at St Catherine's College, Oxford where he was trained as an agriculturalist after completing a Diploma in Agricultural Economics in 1948 and a B.Litt. in 1949. Pratt also qualified as a barrister and studied at the Research Institute and Council of Legal Education (Inner Temple) London.

== Trivia ==
- Solomon Pratt was born on Christmas Day and died on 28 December 2017, aged 96.
