= Herbert Bankole-Bright =

Sierra Leonean politician (1883–1958)

Herbert Christian Bankole-Bright
- Born: Herbert Christian Bankole Bright; 23 August 1883; Okrika, British Nigeria
- Died: 14 December 1958 (aged 75); Freetown, British Sierra Leone
- Education: Wesleyan Boys' High School; Royal College of Physicians
- Occupations: Medical doctor, political activist
- Spouse: Addah Maude Bishop
- Writing career
- Language: English

Herbert Christian Bankole-Bright (23 August 1883 – 14 December 1958) was a well-known political activist in Sierra Leone.

== Early life ==
Herbert Bankole-Bright was born in Okrika, in an area the British would the next year designate the Oil Rivers Protectorate, on 23 August 1883, the son of Jacob Galba Bright and his wife Letitia (née Williams), Creole descendants of Sierra Leone Liberated Africans. Bright's paternal grandfather, John Bright, was an ex-slave who had been liberated off a slave ship with his mother in 1823.

Bright was educated at the Wesleyan Boys' High School in Freetown (1898–1904), and then studied medicine at Edinburgh University (1905–10), before setting up a practice in Freetown. At Edinburgh, he became "politically awake" and was involved in a number of student activist debates and policies. In November 1911 he married Addah Maude, daughter of former legislative council member T. Colenso Bishop, and they eventually had four children.

== Political activist career ==
In 1918, Bright set up the Aurora newspaper, which he edited until 1925. In 1920, he was a founder member of the National Congress of British West Africa, and was elected to the Legislative Council in 1924. In 1925 he inspired Ladipo Solanke's formation of the West African Students' Union, becoming a founder member. With Ernest Beoku-Betts, he campaigned for increased suffrage and against racism, without success.

In 1939, following a feud with Isaac Wallace-Johnson, Bright supported government measures to limit the activities of Johnson's Youth Leagues. This alienated many of Bright's supporters, and he temporarily stepped down from politics.

In the 1940s, Bright founded the National Council of Sierra Leone, which became the main opposition at the 1951 Sierra Leonean general election. After spending the next six years attempting to obstruct all government activities, the National Council lost all its seats at the 1957 election.

== Legacy ==
Professor Akintola J. G. Wyse wrote a biography of H. C. Bankole-Bright that was dedicated to the author's family and his late sister, Lerina Taylor-Bright.
