= Aggrey House =

Hostel in London in 1934 for African students and students of African descent

Coordinates: 51.52365°N 0.11633°W

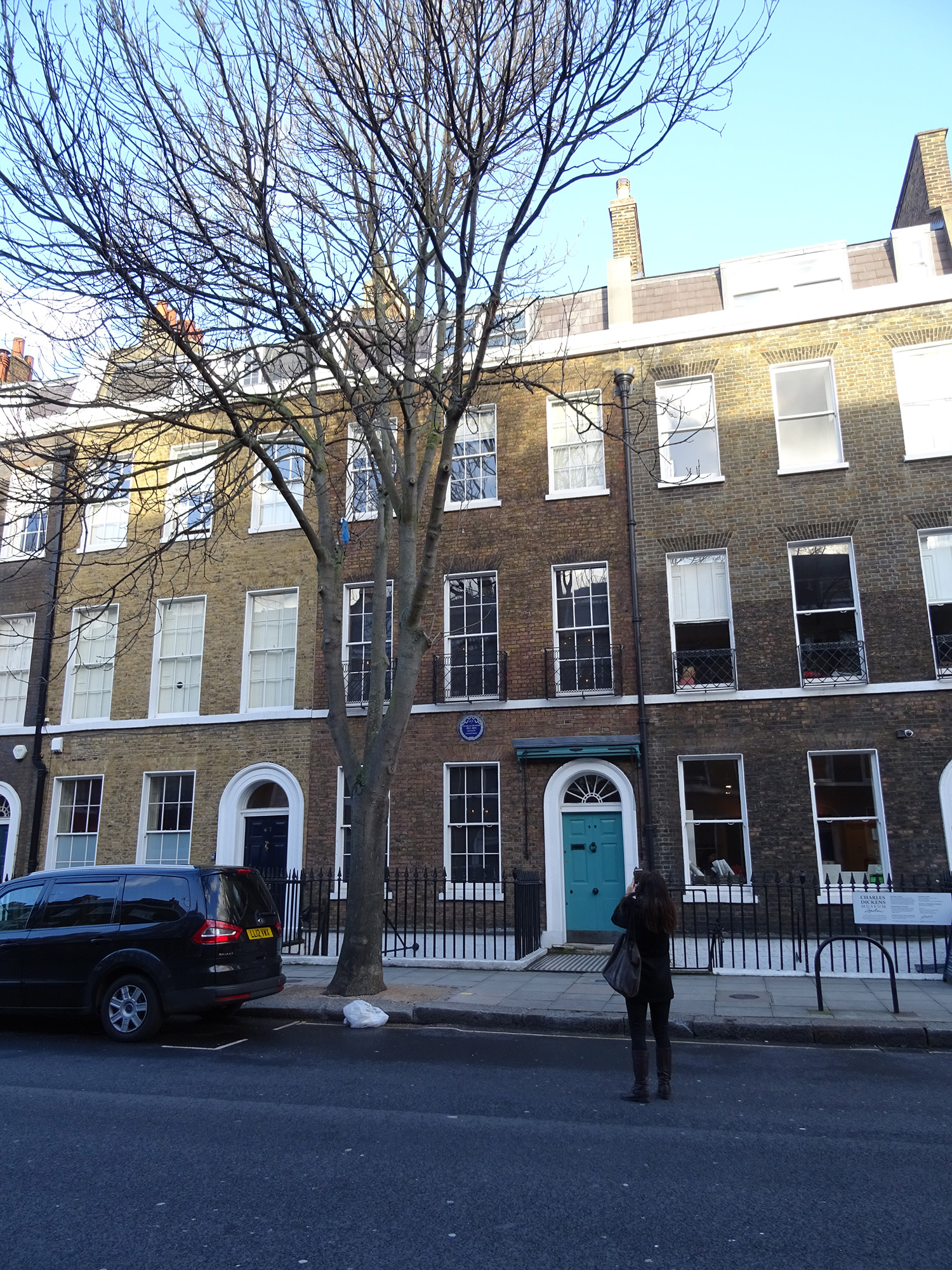
47 Doughty Street, to the left of the photograph, next door to the Charles Dickens Museum, in the centre

Aggrey House was a hostel established in London, England, in 1934 to cater for African students and students of African descent. It was named after James Emman Kwegyir Aggrey. It was located at 47 Doughty Street – next door to what had once been the home of Charles Dickens – a typical Georgian terraced house, on the recommendations made by a Colonial Office committee in 1930.

Ivor Cummings was appointed Warden in 1935. He was responsible for organising meetings, lectures, dances and other social events for the residents. George Padmore and Jomo Kenyatta were among notable figures who visited and spoke at Aggrey House.

In 1943, new premises were obtained at 17 Russell Square, where Aggrey House was reopened as "The Colonial Centre", intended to cater for all classes of Colonial students, as well as both members of the armed forces and civilian war workers.
