= 1924 Sierra Leonean general election =

General elections were held in Sierra Leone Colony and Protectorate for the first time on 28 October 1924. The National Congress of British West Africa won all three seats.

== Electoral system ==
The 1924 constitution introduced a 22-member Legislative Council, of which twelve members were government officials. The other ten members included two appointed Europeans representing commercial interests, three elected Africans from the Colony, three appointed paramount chiefs from the Protectorate (two Mende and one Temne), one representing each province, and two appointed Africans from the Colony.

The three elected seats were elected from single-member constituencies, two urban and one rural. Voting was restricted to literate Africans over the age of 21 who owned at least £10 of property in the urban constituencies or £6 in the rural constituency. From the population of approximately 25,000, only 1,866 people registered to vote; 1,016 in Freetown, 511 in the other urban constituency and 339 in the rural constituency.

== Results ==
Constituency	Elected member	Party	Votes
First Urban	Ernest Beoku-Betts	National Congress of British West Africa	607
Second Urban	Herbert Bankole-Bright	National Congress of British West Africa	562
Rural	Albert Tuboku-Metzger	National Congress of British West Africa	173
Source: Wyse

The unsuccessful candidates included former mayor of Freetown Samuel Barlatt (373 votes) and John Songo-Davies (199 votes). Only 12 of the votes cast were invalid.

== Aftermath ==
Following the elections, Governor Charles Turner appointed three paramount chiefs; Bai Kumba of the Mande Chiefdom, Bai Kompa of Koya Temne and Tucker of the Nangoba Bullom chiefdom.
