= Ernest Beoku-Betts =

Sierra Leonean politician

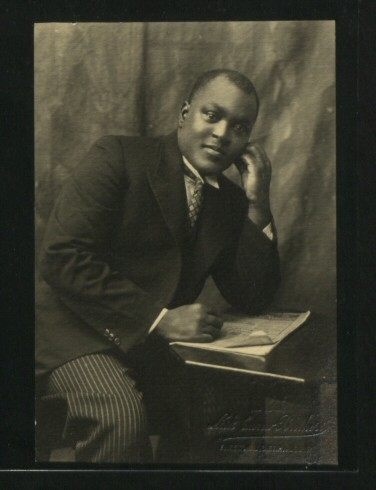
Ernest Beoku-Betts in 1937

Sir Ernest Samuel Beoku-Betts MBE (March 15, 1895 – 1957) was a Sierra Leonean Creole lawyer who was very active in civic matters. He served first as member of the Freetown City Council and subsequently as its mayor (1925–1926). He was also elected to the Legislative Council in 1924, where he worked closely with Herbert Bankole-Bright.

In 1937, Beoku-Betts left politics and became police magistrate. He assumed more senior positions during subsequent years and was the first national to be the Vice-President of the Legislative Council.

He was knighted by Queen Elizabeth the year of his death. He had won recognition for the legal progress of Sierra Leone during the colonial period as well as constitutional progress toward independence.
