= Sierra Leone Progressive Independence Movement =

Sierra Leone Progressive Independence Movement (also known as 'Dawoh' ('the pot')) was a political party in Sierra Leone, led by Paramount Chief from Kono, Tamba Sungu Mbriwa. The party was founded in 1958, through the merger of the Kono Progressive Movement and the Sierra Leone Independence Movement. The objective of the party was, according to its founding declaration, to "prosecute more vigorously a political campaign for national unity and independence."

Kono Mannda, the mouthpiece of the erstwhile KPM, became the organ of the SLPIM in Kono.

The party suffered from repression from the government, SLST and Paramount Chiefs. In September 1960, Mbriwa was jailed for six months.

In February 1961, Mbriwa was elected Paramount Chief of Fiama Chiefdom.

In 1962 an alliance was declared between SLPIM and the All People's Congress. One day after the announcement, President Albert Margai dismissed Mbriwa.

In the election SLPIM obtained 5.2% of the national vote and four seats (all from Kono). Outside of Kono, the candidates of the party fared poorly.

In 1963 the Sierra Leone People's Party began pressurizing the SLPIM parliamentarians to join the government bloc. The alliance with APC was broken and the party was divided on how to relate to the SLPP. Three of the four SLPIM MPs, S. L. Matturi, D. S. Bockari and G. W. Mani, joined the SLPP. Leading figures who remained with SLPIM, such as the family of T.R. Foyoh, went into exile.

In the mid-1960s the SLPIM was dissolved by Mbriwa. The sole remaining SLPIM Member of Parliament, S.H. Gandi Capio, joined the APC. In July 1965 the Democratic People's Congress was formed by some remaining elements of the SLPIM.
