= Sierra Leone Creole people =

Ethnic group of Sierra Leone

Creole people of Sierra Leone (Krio)
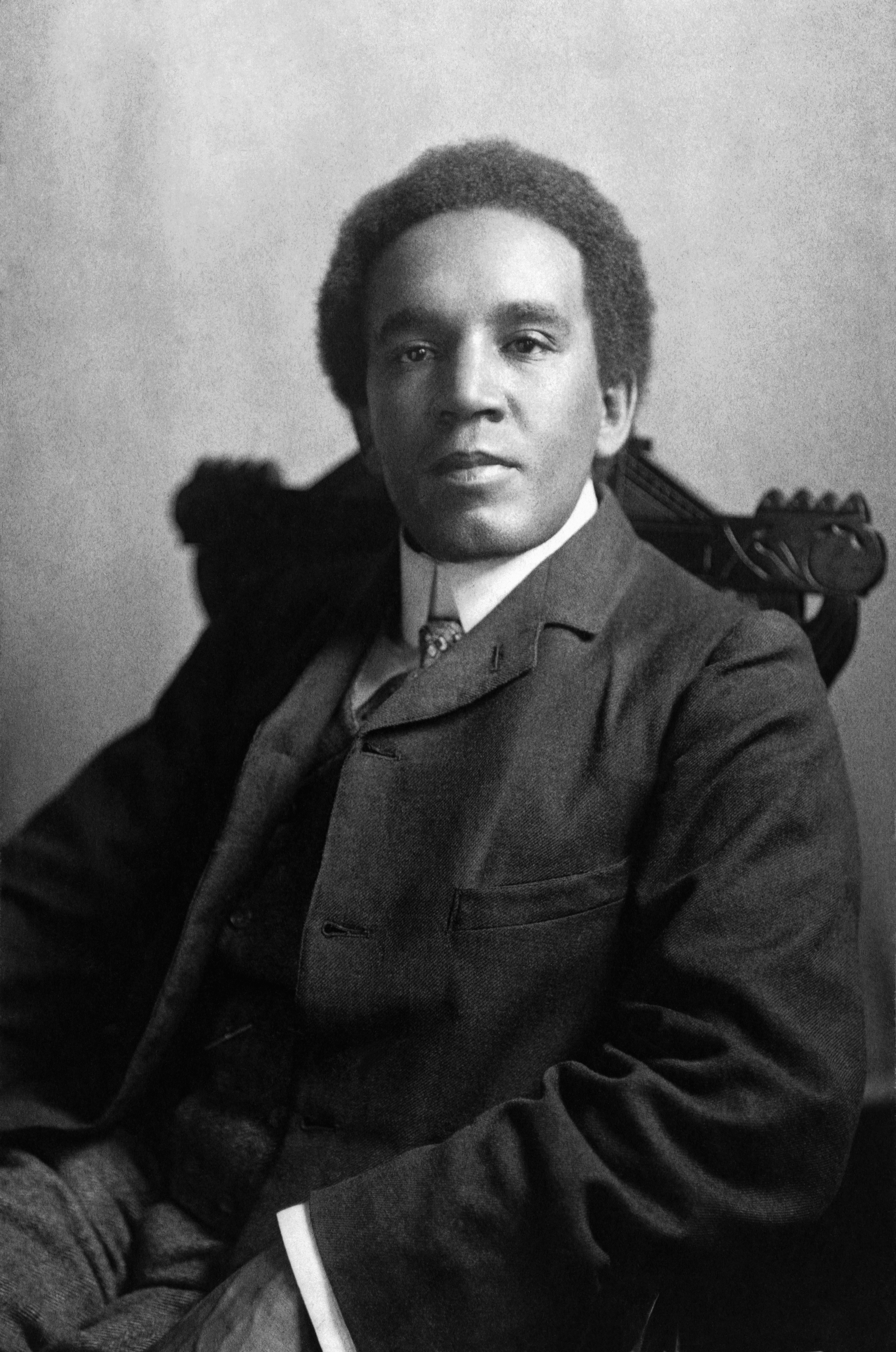
- Samuel Coleridge-Taylor

Total population
- 104,311 (2022)

Regions with significant populations
- Sierra Leone, Gambia, United States, United Kingdom

Languages
- Krio, English

Religion
- Anglican • Methodist • Catholic • Baptist

Related ethnic groups
- African Americans, Afro-Caribbeans, Americo-Liberians, Atlantic Creoles, Black Britons, Black Nova Scotians, Gambian Creoles, Gold Coast Euro-Africans, Jamaican Maroons, Krio Fernandinos, Saro people, Tabom people.

The Sierra Leone Creole people (Krio: Krio pipul) are an ethnic group of Sierra Leone. The Sierra Leone Creole people are descendants of freed African-American, Afro-Caribbean, and Liberated African slaves who settled in the Western Area of Sierra Leone between 1787 and about 1885. The colony was established by the British, supported by abolitionists, under the Sierra Leone Company as a place for freedmen. The settlers called their new settlement Freetown. Today, the Sierra Leone Creoles are 1.2 percent of the population of Sierra Leone.

The Creoles of Sierra Leone have varying degrees of European ancestry, similar to their Americo-Liberian neighbours and sister ethnic group in Liberia. In Sierra Leone, some of the settlers intermarried with English colonial residents and other Europeans. Through the Jamaican Maroons, some Creoles probably also have indigenous Amerindian Taíno ancestry. The mingling of newly freed black and racially-mixed Nova Scotians and Jamaican Maroons from the 'New World' with Liberated Africans – such as the Bakongo, Ewe, Igbo, and Yoruba – over several generations in the late 18th and early 19th centuries, led to the eventual formation of a Creole ethnicity.

The Americo-Liberians and Sierra Leone Creoles are the only recognised ethnic group of African-American, Liberated African, and Afro-Caribbean descent in West Africa. Thoroughly westernized in their manners, the Creoles as a class developed close relationships with the British colonial administration; they became educated in British institutions and advanced to prominent leadership positions in colonial Sierra Leone and British West Africa. Partly due to this history, many Sierra Leone Creoles have first names and/or surnames that are anglicized or British in origin.

The Creoles are overwhelmingly Christian (Note: The Creoles are Christians, whether nominal or in practice, at over 98 percent. Recently, some scholars consider the Oku ethnic group to be Creoles, although others reject this premise given the differentiation in admixture, religion, and cultural practices between the Oku and Creoles, such as the practice of female genital mutilation, bundu society membership and polygamy among the Oku people) and the vast majority of them reside in Freetown and its surrounding Western Area region of Sierra Leone. From their mix of peoples, the Creoles developed what is now the native Krio language, a creole deriving from English, indigenous West African languages, and other European languages. It is the most widely spoken language in virtually all parts of Sierra Leone. As the Krio language is spoken by 96 percent of the country's population, it unites all the different ethnic groups, especially in their trade and interaction with each other. Krio is also the primary language of communication among Sierra Leoneans living abroad.

The Sierra Leone Creoles settled across West Africa in the nineteenth century in communities such as Limbe (Cameroon); Conakry (Guinea); Banjul (Gambia); Lagos, Abeokuta, Calabar, Onisha (Nigeria); Accra, Cape Coast (Ghana) and Fernando Pó (Equatorial Guinea). The Krio language of the Creole people influenced other pidgins such as Cameroonian Pidgin English, Nigerian Pidgin English, and Pichinglis. As a result of their history, the Gambian Creole people, or Aku people of the Gambia, the Saro people of Nigeria, and the Krio Fernandinos of Equatorial Guinea, are sub-ethnic groups or partly descended from the Sierra Leone Creole people or their ancestors.

== Ethnonymy and overview ==
The English word creole (Note: Webster's online etymological dictionary states the meaning of creole as a "person born in a country but of a people not indigenous to it," but also notes that the meaning varies according to local use.) derives from the French créole, which in turn came from Portuguese crioulo, a diminutive of cria, meaning a person raised in one's house. Cria derives from criar, meaning "to raise or bring up", itself derived from the Latin creare, meaning "to make, bring forth, produce, beget"; — itself the source of the English word "create". The word creole has several cognates in other languages, such as créole, creolo, criol, criollo, crioulo, kreol, kreyol, krio, kriol, kriolu, and kriyoyo.

In Louisiana, the term Creole has been used since 1792 to represent descendants of African or ethnically mixed parents as well as children of French and Spanish descent with no racial mixing. Its use to describe languages started from 1879, while as an adjective, from 1748. In some Spanish-speaking countries, the word Criollo is used today to describe something local or very typical of a particular Latin American country.

In the Caribbean, the term broadly refers to all the people, whatever their class or ancestry — African, East Asian, European, Indian — who are part of the culture of the Caribbean. In Trinidad, the term Creole is used to designate all Trinidadians except those of Asian origin. In French Guiana the term refers to anyone, regardless of skin colour, who has adopted a European way of life, and in neighbouring Suriname, the term refers only to the descendants of enslaved Africans.

In Africa, the term Creole refers to any ethnic group formed during the European colonial era, with some mix of African and non-African racial or cultural heritage. Creole communities are found on most African islands and along the continent's coastal regions where indigenous Africans first interacted with Europeans. As a result of these contacts, five major Creole types emerged: Portuguese, African American, Dutch, French and British.

The Crioulos of African or mixed Portuguese and African descent eventually gave rise to several ethnic groups in Cape Verde, Guinea-Bissau, São Tomé e Príncipe, Angola and Mozambique. The Mauritian and Seychellois Creoles are Africans with some French cultural ancestry and are Christianized. On La Réunion, the term Creole applies to the descendants of enslaved Africans born on the island, while in South Africa, the blending of East African and Southeast Asian slaves with Dutch settlers, later produced a creolized population. The Fernandino Creole peoples of Equatorial Guinea are a mix of Afro-Cubans with Emancipados and English-speaking Liberated Africans, while the Americo-Liberians and Sierra Leone Creoles resulted from the intermingling of African Recaptives with Afro-Caribbeans and African Americans.

Perhaps due to the range of divergent descriptions and lack of a coherent definition, Norwegian anthropologist T. H. Eriksen concludes:

“A Creole society, in my understanding, is based wholly or partly on the mass displacement of people who were, often involuntarily, uprooted from their original home, shedding the main features of their social and political organisations on the way, brought into sustained contact with people from other linguistic and cultural areas and obliged to develop, in creative and improvisational ways, new social and cultural forms in the new land, drawing simultaneously on traditions from their respective places of origin and on impulses resulting from the encounter.”

— Thomas Hylland Eriksen, Creolisation as a Recipe for Conviviality (2020)

Today, Creole communities have more in common with each other than they have with any African ethnic groups. On the islands of Africa, creole languages predominate while on the mainland, creole languages are lingua franca or national languages in Guinea-Bissau, Sierra Leone, Liberia, and South Africa. In island communities, Creoles are found in many occupations ranging from agricultural workers to members of society's elite. In the coastal areas of mainland Africa, Creoles acquired economic and political leverage due to their education, culture and close relationships with the colonial administration. They developed a strong sense of ethnic identity and formed their own political organisations. During the independence era of the mid-1900s, some Creoles supported colonial rule but many fought for independence and held positions of power afterwards. In most countries however, Creole political influence gradually gave way to ethnic groups from the interior that were considered 'more African'.

Creole communities in Africa have grown in several ways. Elements of their culture, including language and music, have come to dominate popular culture on the islands. In Creole-established cities on the African mainland, some non-Creoles have assimilated into Creole societies, which are perceived to enjoy privileged status. Those seeking acceptance into a Creole community usually converted to Christianity, the religion shared by nearly all Creoles.

== History ==
In 1787, the British helped 400 freed slaves, primarily African Americans freed during the American Revolutionary War who had been evacuated to London, and Afro-Caribbeans and Africans from London, to relocate to Sierra Leone to settle in what they called the "Province of Freedom." Some of these early settlers had been freed earlier and worked as servants in London. Most of the first group died due to disease and warfare with indigenous peoples. About 64 survived to establish the second Granville Town following the failed first attempt at colonization between 1787 and 1789.

In 1792, 1200 Nova Scotian Settlers from Nova Scotia settled and established the Colony of Sierra Leone and the settlement of Freetown; these were African Americans and their descendants. Many of the adults had left Patriot owners and fought for the British in the Revolutionary War. The Crown had offered slaves freedom who left rebel masters, and thousands joined the British lines. The British resettled 3,000 of the African Americans in Nova Scotia, where many found the climate harsh and struggled with discrimination from white Nova Scotians. More than 1,200 volunteered to settle and establish the new colony of Freetown, which was established by British abolitionists under the Sierra Leone Company.

In 1800, the British government also transported 550 Jamaican maroons to Sierra Leone and subsequent waves of African American and Afro-Caribbean immigrants would settle in Sierra Leone throughout the nineteenth and early twentieth centuries.

After Britain and the United States abolished the international African slave trade beginning in 1808, they patrolled off the continent to intercept illegal shipping. The British resettled Liberated Africans from slave ships at Freetown. The Liberated Africans belonged to West African ethnicities heavily affected by the slave trade, such as the Yoruba, Igbo, Bakongo, and Akan, among others.

Some members of indigenous Sierra Leone ethnicities, were also among the Liberated Africans resettled at Freetown; they also assimilated into Creole culture. Others came to the settlement voluntarily, seeing opportunities in Creole culture in the society.

=== Black Poor and Province of Freedom 1787–1789 ===
The first settlers to find a colony in Sierra Leone were the so-called "Black Poor": African Americans and Afro-Caribbean. 411 settlers arrived in May 1787. Some were Black Loyalists who were either evacuated or travelled to England to petition for a land of their own; Black Loyalists had joined British forces during the American Revolutionary War, many on promises of freedom from enslavement.

On the voyage between Plymouth and Sierra Leone, 96 passengers died. However, enough survived to establish and build a colony. Seventy white women accompanied the men to Sierra Leone. Anna Falconbridge portrayed these white women as prostitutes from Deptford Prison, but they were most likely wives and girlfriends of the black settlers. Their colony was known as the "Province of Freedom" and their settlement was called "Granville Town"' after the English abolitionist Granville Sharp. The British negotiated for the land for the settlement with the local Temne chief, King Tom.

However, before the ships sailed away from Sierra Leone, 50 white women had died, and about 250 remained of the original 440 who left Plymouth. Another 86 settlers died in the first four months. Although initially there was no hostility between the two groups, after King Tom's death the next Temne chief retaliated for a slave trader's burning of his village. He threatened to destroy Granville Town. The Temne ransacked Granville Town and took some Black Poor into slavery, while others became slave traders. In early 1791 Alexander Falconbridge returned, to find only 64 of the original residents (39 black men, 19 black women, and six white women). The 64 people had been cared for by a Greek and a colonist named Thomas Kallingree at Fourah Bay, an abandoned African village. There the settlers reestablished Granville Town. After that time, they were called the "Old Settlers". By this time the Province of Freedom had been destroyed; Granville Sharp did not lead the next settlement movement.

=== Nova Scotians and the Freetown Colony 1792–1799 ===
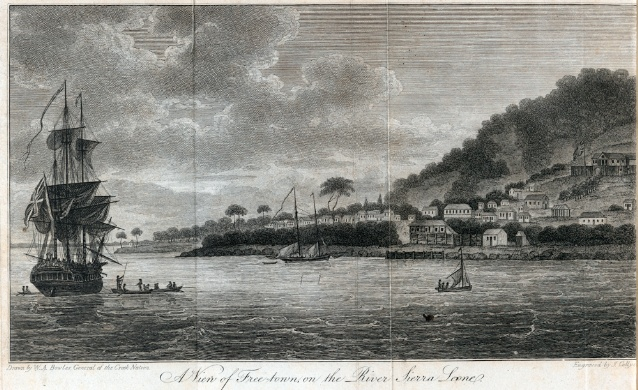
Freetown in 1803

The proponents and directors of the Sierra Leone colony believed that a new colony did not need black settlers from London. The directors decided to offer resettlement to African Americans from Nova Scotia, despite the failure of the last colony. These settlers were Black Loyalists, American slaves who had escaped to British lines and fought with them during the American Revolution, to earn freedom. The British government had transported more than 3,000 freedmen to Nova Scotia for resettlement, together with white Loyalists. Some of the African Americans were from South Carolina and the Sea Islands, of the Gullah culture; others were from states along the eastern seaboard up to New England.

Some 1200 of these blacks emigrated to Sierra Leone from Halifax Harbour on 15 January 1792, arriving between 28 February and 9 March 1792. On 11 March 1792, the Nova Scotian Settlers disembarked from the 14 passenger ships that had carried them from Nova Scotia to Sierra Leone and marched toward the large cotton tree near George Street. As the Settlers gathered under the tree, their preachers held a thanksgiving service and the white minister, Rev. Patrick Gilbert preached a sermon. After the religious services, the settlement was officially established and was designated Freetown. The Settler men cleared the forest and shrub and built a new settlement on the overgrown site that had formerly contained the Granville Town settlement.

They had a profound influence on Creole culture; many of the Western attributes of Creole society were conveyed by the "Settlers", who continued what was familiar to them from their past lives. In Sierra Leone they were called the Nova Scotians or "Settlers" (the 1787 Settlers were called the Old Settlers). They founded the capital of Sierra Leone in 1792. The descendants of African Americans remained an identifiable ethnic group until the 1870s, when the Creole identity was beginning to form.

=== Maroons and other transatlantic immigrants 1800–1819 ===
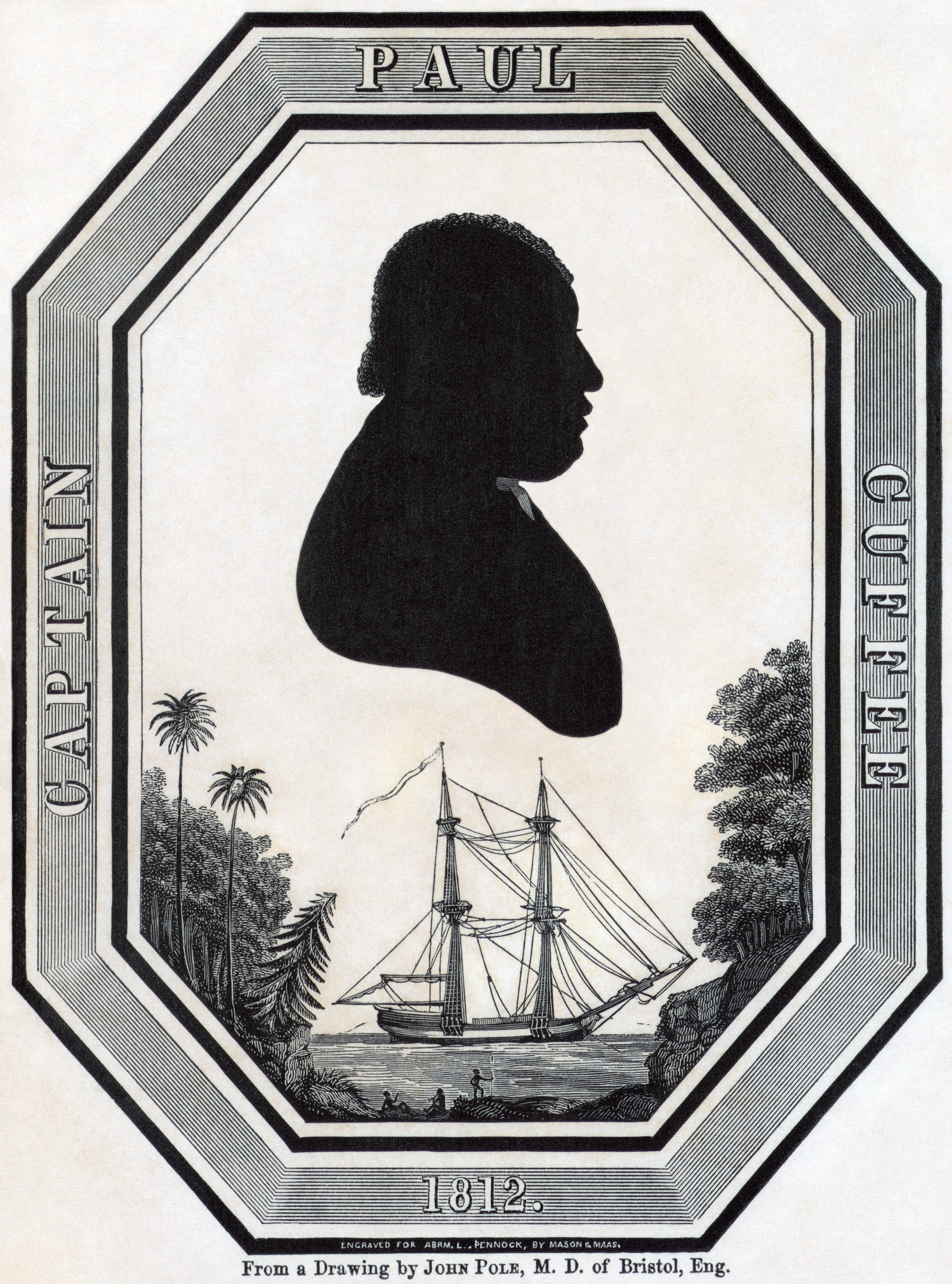
Captain Paul Cuffee transported 38 African Americans to Freetown in 1815

The next arrivals were the Jamaican Maroons; these maroons came specifically from Cudjoe's Town (Trelawny Town), one of the five Maroon cities in Jamaica. The Maroons mainly descended from highly military skilled Ashanti slaves who had escaped plantations and, to a lesser extent, from Jamaican indigenous people. The Maroons numbered around 551, and they helped quell some of the riots against the British from the settlers. The Maroons later fought against the Temne during the Temne Attack of 1801.

The dispute with the Temne was over "rent" which the Temne felt they were owed by the colony. In a twist that became the hallmark of politics in the subregion, the Temne had indeed signed a treaty granting full sovereignty to the Colony but then turned around to say that this was not their understanding. This misunderstanding became violent, when in 1801, the Temne attacked Freetown. The assault failed, resulting instead in the expulsion of the Temne from the area.

The next migrations of transatlantic immigrants between 1800 and 1819 were smaller in comparison to the early Nova Scotian Settlers and Jamaican Maroon immigrants. Afro-Caribbean and Liberated African soldiers from the 2nd and 4th West India Regiments were settled in Freetown and in suburbs around it in 1819. Barbadian rebels who participated in the Bussa Rebellion were transported to colonial Freetown in 1816 and included families such as the Priddy family.

Thirty-eight African Americans (nine families) immigrated to Freetown under the auspices of African-American ship owner Paul Cuffe, of Boston. These Black Americans included Perry Lockes and Prince Saunders from Boston; Abraham Thompson and Peter Williams Jr. from New York City; and Edward Jones from Charleston, South Carolina. Americo-Liberian merchants and traders also settled in colonial Freetown throughout the course of the nineteenth and early twentieth centuries.

Following the Jamaican Maroons and Barbadian rebels, Afro-Caribbean immigrants settled in Freetown, Sierra Leone and in settlements across the Freetown peninsula throughout the course of the nineteenth and early twentieth centuries as missionaries, artisans and colonial officials such as the Porter family from Jamaica.

Prominent Creole families of more recent Afro-Caribbean ancestry include the Farquhar family and their descendants such as the Stuart family and Conton family who settled in Sierra Leone from Barbados, the Bahamas, and Bermuda between the late nineteenth and early twentieth centuries.

=== Recaptives or Liberated Africans 1807–1830s ===
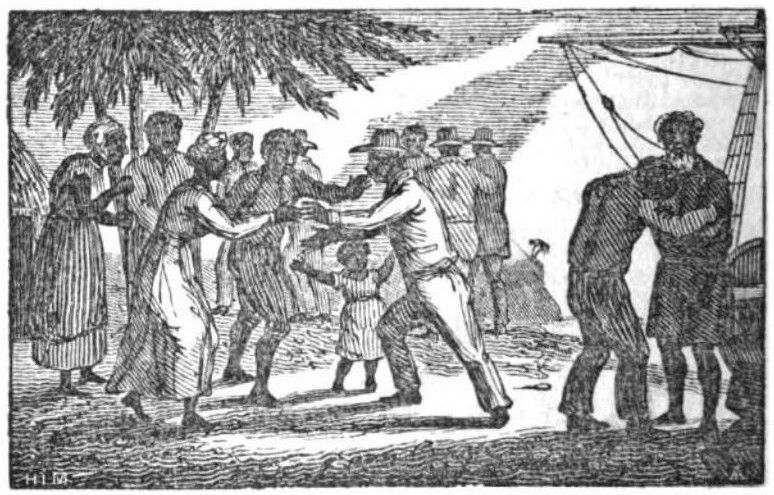
1835 illustration of liberated slaves arriving in Sierra Leone.

The last major group of immigrants to the colony was the Liberated Africans or "Recaptives". Held on slave ships for sale in the western hemisphere, they were liberated by the Royal Navy, which, with the West Africa Squadron, enforced the abolition of the international slave trade after 1808.

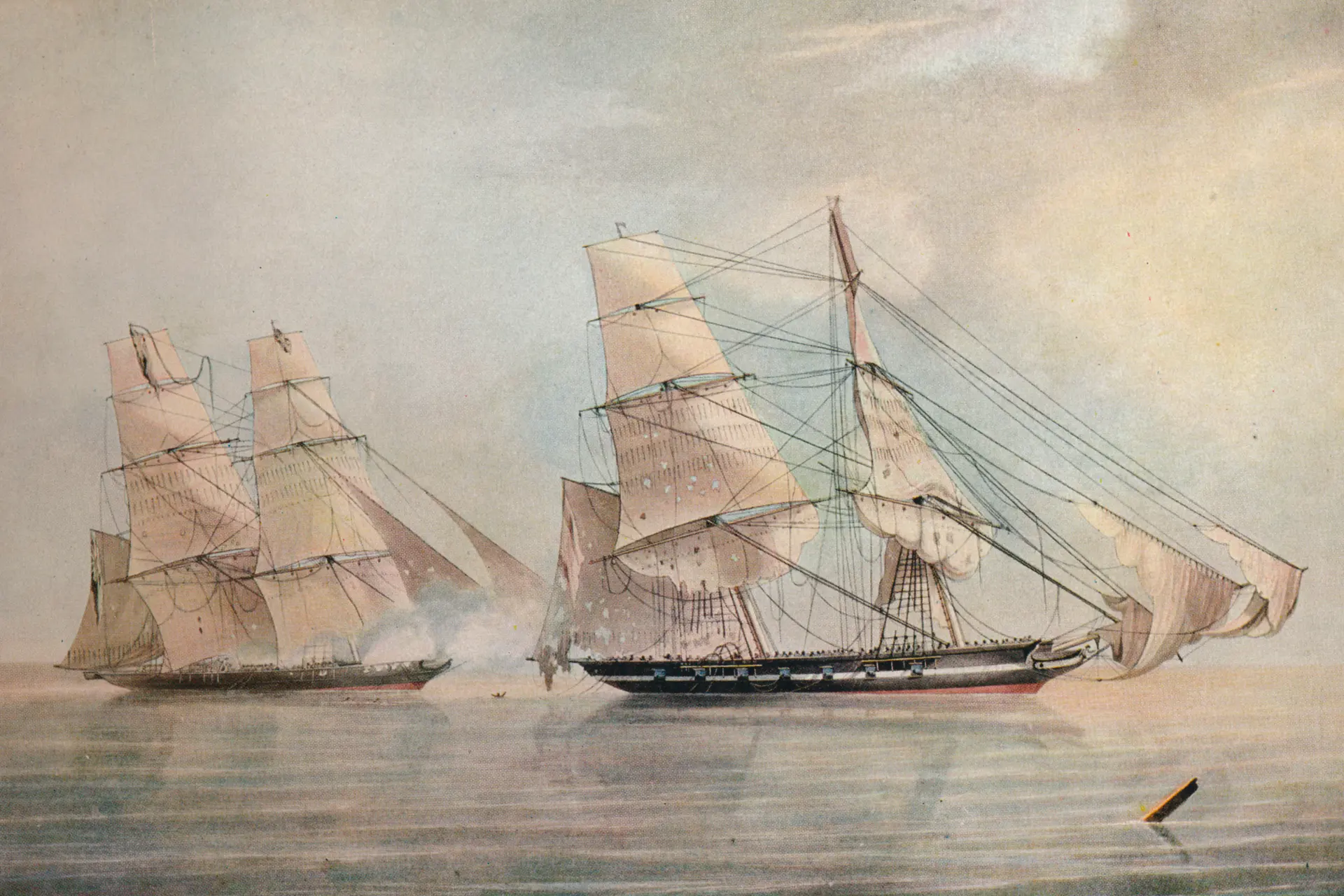
The capture of slave ship El Almirante by HMS Black Joke on 1 February 1829, which led to the freeing of 466 slaves

The Liberated Africans were multi-ethnic and were largely Akan, Aja, Bakongo, Ewe, Angolan, Wolof, Hausa, Yoruba, Igbo, Bambara, Nupe, and Fulani people who had been enslaved by illegal slave traders. The Liberated Africans also included Sherbro, Mende and Temne people who had been enslaved in territories neighbouring the Colony of Sierra Leone.

The Liberated Africans, also called Recaptives, contributed greatly to the Creole culture. While the Settlers, Maroons, and transatlantic immigrants gave the Creoles their Christianity, some of their customs, and their Western influence, the Liberated Africans modified their customs to adopt those of the Nova Scotians and Europeans, yet kept some of their ethnic traditions.

Initially, the British colonial administration intervened to ensure the Recaptives became firmly rooted in Freetown society; they served in the army with the West India Regiment, and they were assigned as apprentices in the houses of Settlers and Maroons. Sometimes, if a child's parents died, the young Recaptive would be adopted by a Settler or Maroon family. The two groups mixed and mingled in society.

As the Recaptives began to trade and spread Christianity throughout West Africa, they began to dominate Freetown society. The Recaptives intermarried with the Settlers and Maroons, and the two groups became a fusion of African and Western societies.

== Settlements ==
The ancestors of the Creoles founded the Colony of Sierra Leone and established the settlement of Freetown in 1792. They based the plan on what they were familiar with – the grid of a North American colonial town. The families originally from Nova Scotia – the Balls, Burdens, Chambers, Davis, Dixons, Georges (descendants of David George), Keelings, Leighs, Moores, Peters (descendants of Thomas Peters or Stephen Peters), Prestons, Snowballs, Staffords, Turners, Willoughsby, Williams, and the Goodings – took up residence in Settler Town. The town was in close proximity to Cline Town (then Granville Town). Eighty percent of Nova Scotians lived on five streets: Rawdon, Wilberforce, Howe, East, and Charlotte street.

The next group of settlers were Jamaican Maroons from Cudjoe's Town, who arrived in Freetown, via Nova Scotia, in 1800. Notable families such as the Jarretts, Smiths, Hortons, Coles, Porters, Jones, and the Morgans, settled in Maroon Town, Sierra Leone. Seventy percent of Maroons lived on five streets: Gloucester, George, Trelawney, Walpole, and Westmoreland street. The Jamaican Maroon settlement was west of Settler Town between Walpole street and King Tom.

The Liberated African ancestors – principally of Akan, Bakongo, Ewe, Igbo and Yoruba origin – settled across the Western Area peninsula of Sierra Leone. By the 1850s, they had already established Aberdeen, Bathurst, Charlotte, Dublin, Gloucester, Goderich, Grafton, Hastings, Kent, Kissy, Leicester, Murray Town, Regent, Ricketts, Sussex, Waterloo, Wellington, Wilberforce and York.

Between the late 18th and early 20th centuries, immigrants from the Bahamas, Barbados, Bermuda, Liberia and the Gold Coast likewise settled in Freetown and eventually coalesced into the Sierra Leone Creole identity. In the 21st century, the majority of Creoles in Sierra Leone continue to reside in Freetown and along the surrounding Western Area peninsula where their language and culture have a disproportionate influence relative to their population.

The Creole people acted as colonial administrators, traders and missionaries in other parts of West Africa during the 19th century, and as a result, there are also Creole communities in The Gambia, Nigeria, Cameroon, and Equatorial Guinea. Due to normal migration patterns, the Sierra Leone Civil War, and some discrimination at home, many Sierra Leone Creoles live abroad in the United States and the United Kingdom. In the United States, Creoles are mostly settled in Washington DC, Maryland, Virginia, Texas, New York, Georgia, California and North Carolina.

== Religion ==
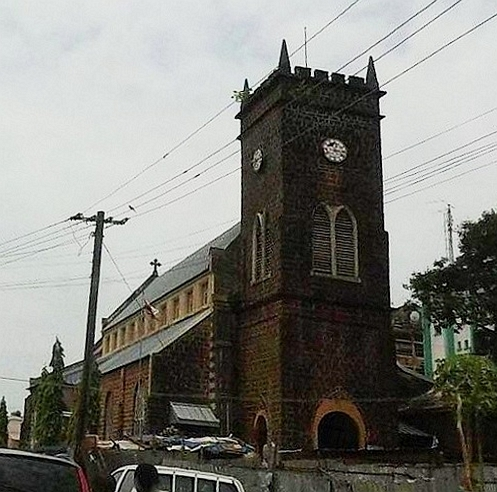
St. George's Cathedral, Freetown

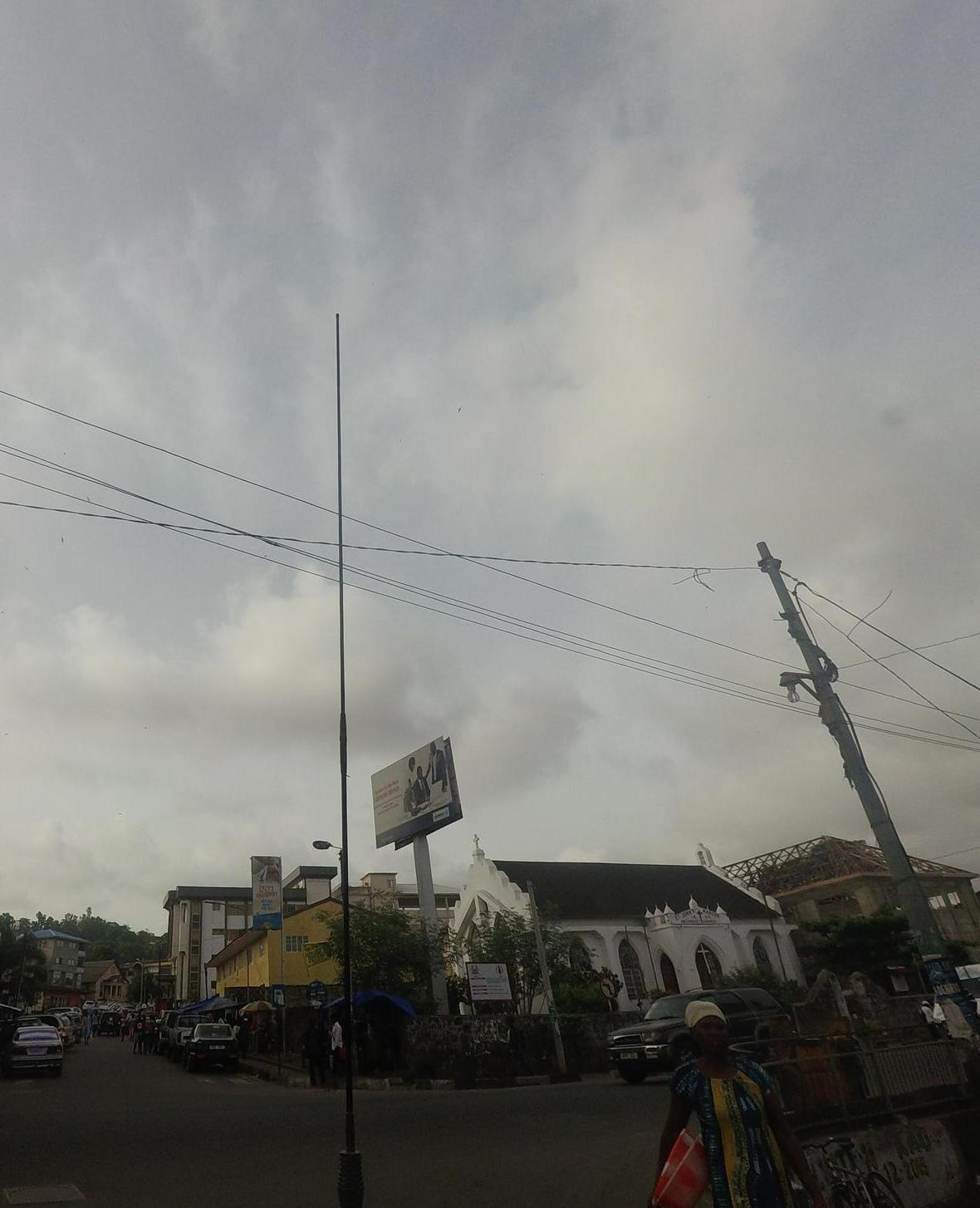
St. John's Maroon Church in Freetown

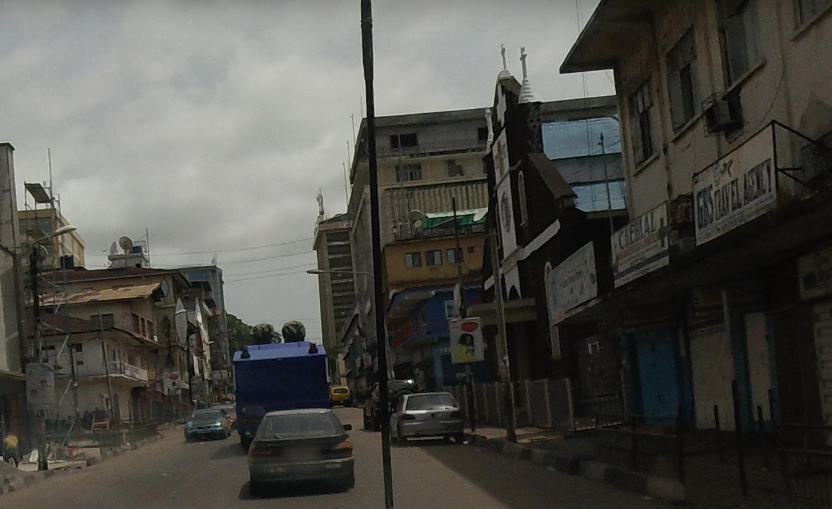
Sacred Heart Cathedral, Freetown

The Creoles are Christians, whether nominal or in practice, at more than 98 percent. A large proportion of the settlers from Nova Scotia and the Caribbean were Christians. Many liberated Africans also converted to Christianity.

The Creoles were instrumental in the establishment of Pan-African Christianity. Between 1840 and 1900, at least six out of every ten black African clergy in the Anglican Church across West Africa was a Creole. By the 1820s, Sierra Leone already had more Christians than the entirety of tropical Africa. Educational institutions such as Fourah Bay College were initially established with the objective of training Christian clergy and educators, who were later dispatched across West Africa to spread Christianity.

Creole denominations are mainly Protestant with the Anglican and Methodist churches having the largest Creole congregants. However, smaller denominations such as the Baptist church and Countess of Huntingdon denominations in places such as Freetown, and Waterloo, Sierra Leone, also have Creole attendees, although these are smaller in number compared to Creole Anglicans and Methodists.

Creole church attendees congregate at traditional "Creole" churches in Freetown such as St. George's Cathedral, Trinity Church, St John's Maroon Church, Ebenezer Methodist Church, Rawdon Street Methodist Church, and Zion Methodist Church, Wilberforce Street.

Prominent Creole Anglicans include Edward Fasholé-Luke and Creoles such as Arthur Thomas Porter, Canon Harry Sawyerr and Robert Wellesley-Cole. Well-known Creole Methodists include Sylvia Blyden, a newspaper proprietor and Creoles such as Macormack Easmon, Edna Elliott-Horton, and George T.O. Robinson, the founder of the Krio Descendants Union.

Although Creoles are primarily Protestant, there are a small number of Creole Catholics who attend Catholic churches such as St. Anthony's Church in Brookfields and the Sacred Heart Cathedral in Freetown. Prominent Creole Catholics include Dr Monty Jones, Bertha Conton and Florence Dillsworth and, in previous generations, James C.E. Parkes.

== Language ==
The official language of Sierra Leone is English. In addition to English, the Sierra Leone Creoles also speak a distinctive creole language named after their ethnic group called Creole or Krio. Krio was strongly influenced by British English, Gullah, African American Vernacular English, Jamaican Creole, Akan, Igbo and Yoruba.

Krio is widely spoken throughout Freetown and the surrounding towns, such that Krio speakers are no longer presumed to be of the Creole ethnic group.

The Creole people acted as traders and missionaries in other parts of West Africa during the 19th century. As a result of Sierra Leone Creole migratory patterns, in the Gambia, the Gambian Creole or Aku community speak a dialect called the Aku language that is very similar to Krio in Sierra Leone. Fernando Po Creole English is also largely a result of Sierra Leone Creole migrants. A small number of liberated Africans returned to the land of their origins, such as the Saros of Nigeria who not only took their Western names with them but also imported Krio words like sabi into Nigerian Pidgin English.

In 1993, there were 473,000 speakers in Sierra Leone (493,470 in all countries); Krio was the third-most spoken language behind Mende (1,480,000) and Themne (1,230,000). Today, Krio is the most widely spoken language in Sierra Leone utilized by 96 percent of the country's population. It unites all the different ethnic groups, especially in their trade and interaction with each other. Krio is the primary language of communication among Sierra Leoneans living abroad, and has also heavily influenced Sierra Leonean English.

Native Krio speakers of the Creole ethnicity lived principally in Freetown communities, on the Peninsula, on the Banana Islands and York Island, and in Bonthe.

== Culture ==
A Creole family, circa 1918.

Creole culture is a fusion of West African, North American and British cultures reflected in both Victorian and Edwardian modes of Christianity, morality, norms and values. The Creoles were economically dominant in trade and held prominent leadership positions in colonial Sierra Leone and British West Africa. They were influential in intellectual, technocratic, artisanal, commercial and public life in general, actively participating in multiple fields of scholarly and civic importance.

From their earliest presence in Sierra Leone and British West Africa, the Creoles, or their ancestors, have significantly contributed science, literature, art, agricultural skills, cuisine, clothing styles, music, language, pan-african christianity and cultural innovation. Notable examples include Nova Scotian settlers such as Thomas Peters, David George and Moses Wilkinson who were founding figures of the nation of Sierra Leone. In biomedicine, the discovery of the breakdown of insulin in the human body, by Davidson Nicol, was a breakthrough for the treatment of diabetes. John Farrell Easmon coined the term Blackwater fever and wrote the first clinical diagnosis of the disease linking it to malaria. In agriscience, James Pinson Davies is credited with pioneering cocoa farming in West Africa, while William Vivour was the single most successful 19th-century planter in Africa. Other notable Creoles, or their ancestors, made significant contributions to Sierra Leone and British West Africa, and were pioneers in several categories of human endeavour.

=== Marriage and family ===
Creoles observe dating and marriage customs that reflect their westernized and broader West African cultural retentions. Creole wedding ceremonies involve the gej or put stop – an elaborate Shakespearean performance in which the hand of the bride is asked for, following the appearance of several 'roses'. Among the gifts presented by the future groom's representatives are a calabash, some kola nuts, various domestic items a wife would use (such as needles and some thread), but also a Bible, a ring, and some money.

Creole traditional wedding attire is a morning suit or lounge suit for the bridegroom and the women wear the traditional white wedding dress. Creoles marry in church weddings and in the Victorian and Edwardian era, relatives sought out and introduced prospective suitors from desirable families to their kin seeking a spouse. When a suitor has been chosen by the prospective groom or bride, traditionally the groom's parents set a "put stop" day. After this day, the girl is expected to no longer entertain other suitors. On the evening before the wedding, the groom's friends treat him to "bachelor's eve," a rowdy last fling before marriage.

Ashobis, (parties) at which every guest is expected to wear the same type of materials, are held on the day of the wedding or some days after, for newlyweds.

Creoles live in nuclear families (father, mother, and their children), but the extended family is important to them as well. More affluent family members are expected to help those who are less fortunate. They assist poorer relatives with school fees and job opportunities. In most Creole families, women and elder siblings care for the children who in turn, are expected to complete the household chores.

=== Twins in Creole society ===
Twins are important for the Creole who tend to give special names to each one. The naming convention used by the Creoles comes from their Yoruba Liberated African ancestry. The first of the twins to be born is traditionally named Taiyewo or Tayewo, which means 'the first to taste the world', or the 'slave to the second twin', this is often shortened to Taiwo, Taiye or Taye. Kehinde is the name of the last born twin and it means, 'the child that came behind gets the rights of the elder'.

=== Music ===
Sierra Leonean gumbe music originates from the Jamaican Maroon ancestors of the Creole people. It is primarily a vocal and percussive musical genre that has been associated with nationalist thought since colonial times.

The gumbe drum is an important cultural symbol played to induce a trance-like state which connects the Creoles with their ancestors. Generally, the music is produced using the gumbe drum, the maracash and the saw. The maracash is a glass bottle and metallic object played together to produce a desirable rhythm. The jagged edge of the saw is rubbed against another sharp object to produce a rasping sound.

In modern times, gumbe music has become a key feature in Sierra Leone's musical landscape. It is often mixed with other more contemporary musical genres to create an authentic local sound.

=== Attire ===
Present-day Creoles, similar to other Sierra Leoneans, wear both African and Western-style dress. Ethnic groups in Sierra Leone had been accustomed to seeing European dress prior to the arrival of the Creoles, as a consequence of extensive trade with Europeans dating to the fifteenth and sixteenth centuries.

However, the ethnic groups who inhabited Sierra Leone did not customarily wear Western-style dress, until they were popularized by the Creole. Like their Americo-Liberian neighbors, Creole fashion between the Victorian and Edwardian era consisted of a top hat and frock coat for men and a petticoat for women, although some Creole women sometimes wore the Jamaican Maroon Kabaslot and Kotoku, the latter a Akan or Ga word for money bag.

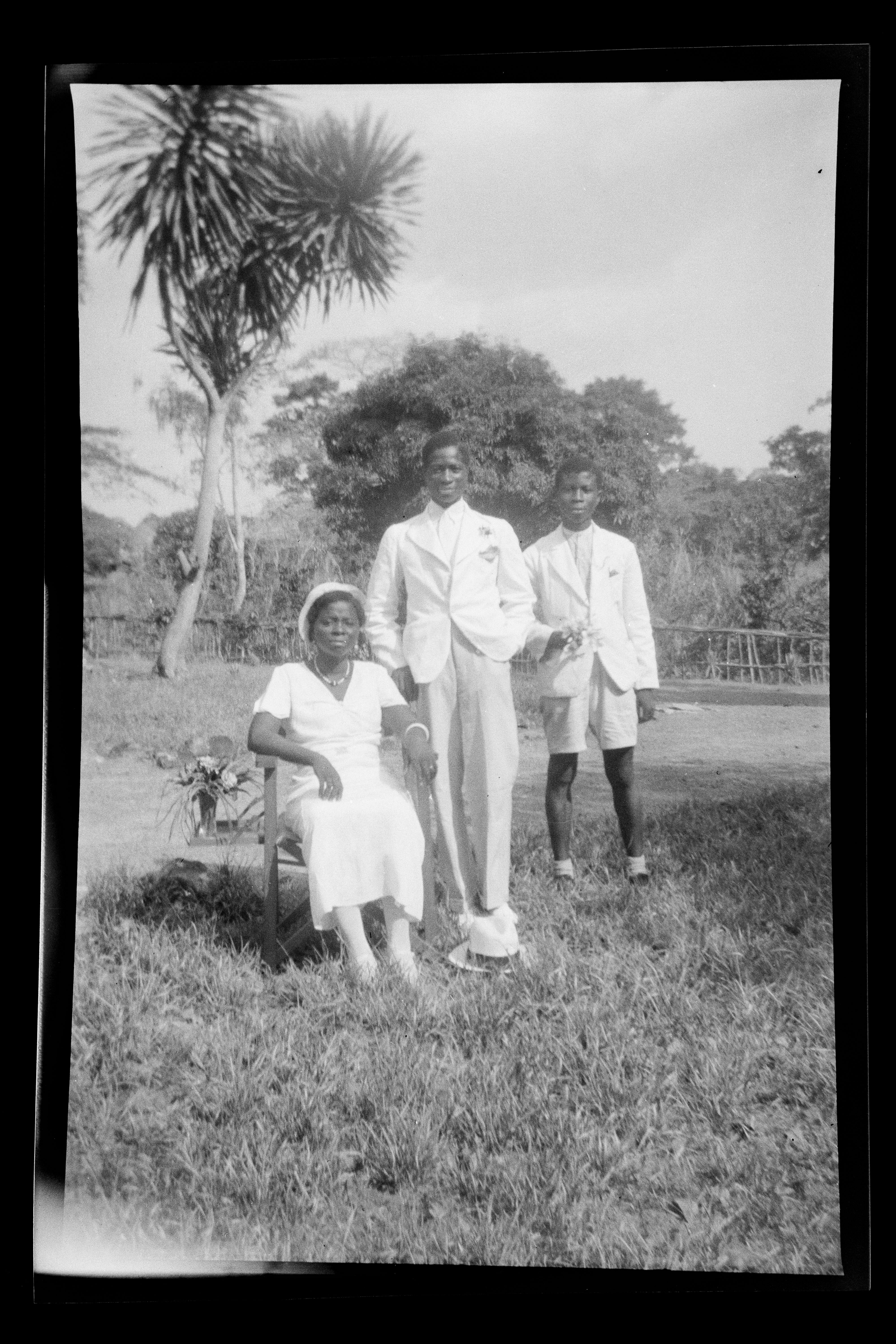
Portrait of a Creole family in Sierra Leone, early 1900s.

Although Creoles continue to wear elaborate dress style for special occasions such as weddings and parades, they adapted their styles of dress to incorporate newer Western-style fashion and intricate African-style dresses between the early to late 20th century.

Today, teenage fashion—jeans, T-shirts, and sneakers—are very much in style among young Creole people. However, older Sierra Leone Creoles still dress conservatively in Western-style suits and dresses and some Creole women still wear the Jamaican Maroon Kabaslot, Kotoku, and carpet slippers and its derivative, the "print" that is a fusion of older African American, Afro-Caribbean and British dress styles.

=== Cuisine ===
Breakfast meal of some Creoles consist of porridge or English breakfast typically consisting of fried, poached or scrambled eggs, fried tomatoes or mushrooms, fried bread or buttered toast, and sausages. Noonday meal includes Western style or Caribbean-derived cuisines and also African food.

Creole meals often coincide with specific days of the week. On Saturdays, fufu a dough-like paste made of cassava pounded into flour and a type of palaver sauce or plassas (leafy vegetable sauce) is often eaten. This is a spicy dish consisting of spinach with tripe, fish, beef, and chicken. It is often made with palm oil except for wayt soup (white soup). Additionally, other types of typical Creole plassas may be eaten with fufu, such as shakpa, okra, egusi, bologi, greens, krain krain, bitterleaf and sawa sawa among others.

Sunday dinner is a West African one-pot meal, jollof rice or couscous and stew or peanut soup, including some plantains and salad. Awujoh (Note: Awujoh originates from the Yoruba Liberated African ancestry of the Creoles. Awujoh ceremonies are held for the protection of newborns and newlyweds by ancestral spirits and as a means to acquire guidance and wisdom regarding aspects of death.) meals on Fridays or other festive occasions are usually accompanied by sweet potato cooked in palm oil, black-eyed beans, eba, oleleh, agidi, plantain, rice bread and akara with ginger beer. On other days, a variety of local dishes may be consumed.

=== Rites of passage ===
Creoles use combined British Christian cultural practices and certain elements of African rituals in connection with rites of passage such as births and deaths. Creoles have christening and baptismal ceremonies but also have a naming ceremony commonly referred to as pull-na-doh or komojadé on the seventh day following the birth, which is held to celebrate a new-born.

For life cycle ceremonies related to death among the Creoles, one such ceremony is the babichu or barbecue of Jamaican Maroon origin and the subsequently more prevalent Liberated African awujoh feast, intended to celebrate the anniversaries of ancestors who have died. Awujoh feasts are held in remembrance of deceased family members, generally on the first anniversary of their death but sometimes on the fifth, tenth, or fifteenth anniversaries, etc.

Among some Creole families, when someone dies, pictures in the house are turned toward the wall and all mirrors or reflecting surfaces covered. At the wake held before the burial, people clap and sing "shouts"(negro spirituals) loudly to make sure the corpse is not merely in a trance. The next day the body is washed, placed in shrouds (burial cloths), and laid on a bed for a final viewing. Then it is placed in a coffin and taken to the church for the service, and lastly to the cemetery for burial.

The period of mourning lasts one year. On the third, seventh, and fortieth day after death, awujoh feasts are held. The feast on the fortieth day marks the spirit's last day on earth. The family and guests eat a big meal. Portions of the meal and kola nuts are placed into a hole for the dead. The "pull mooning" day – the end of mourning – occurs at the end of one year (the first anniversary of a death). The mourners wear white, visit the cemetery and then return home for refreshments.

=== Creole folktales ===
Creoles have inherited a wide range of proverbs and folktales, including Anansi stories, from their multi-ethnic ancestors including the Jamaican Maroons and the Akan and Ewe Liberated Africans. They entertain and provide instruction in Creole values and traditions. Among the best loved are Creole stories about Anansi the spider. The following is a typical spider tale:

“Once the spider was fat. He loved eating, but detested work and had not planted or fished all season. One day the villagers were preparing a feast. From his forest web, he could smell the mouth-watering cooking. He knew that if he visited friends, they would feed him as was the custom. So he called his two sons and told both of them to tie a rope around his waist and set off in opposite directions for the two closest villages, each holding one end of the rope. They were to pull on the rope when the food was ready. But both villages began eating at the same time, and when the sons began pulling the rope, it grew tighter and tighter, squeezing the greedy spider. When the feasting was over and the sons came to look for him, they found a big head, a big body, and a very thin waist!”

Anansi stories are part of an ancient mythology that is rooted in Liberated African folklore and concerns the interaction between divine and semi-divine beings, royalty, humans, animals, plants and seemingly inanimate objects.

=== Creole culture and broader Sierra Leonean cultures ===
Oku people

The Oku have origins among the Liberated African community of settlers in Sierra Leone and have historically intermarried with some Creole people. However, several scholars such as Ramatoulie Onikepo Othman and Olumbe Bassir classify the Oku as distinct from the Creoles because of their ancestry and strong Muslim culture.

In contrast to the Oku people, the Creoles are Christian and are a mixture of various ethnic groups including African Americans, Afro-Caribbeans, and Liberated Africans of Igbo, Akan and Yoruba descent in addition to other African ethnic groups and European ancestry. Furthermore, unlike the Oku people, the Creoles do not practice cliterodotomy, engage in the Bundu society, and are monogamous.

More recently, some scholars consider the Oku to be a sub-ethnic group of the Creoles, based on their close association with British colonists and their adoption of Western education and other aspects of culture. Those classifying the Oku as part of the Sierra Leone Creole people note their adoption of similar English or European surnames (although this was a minority of Oku) and cultural aspects such as egungun, gelede, hunters' masquerade, esusu, awujoh and komojadé. However, as scholars have outlined, the few cultural similarities between the Creole and Oku people are because there are some Yoruba cultural retentions from the christianized Yoruba liberated Africans found among the Creoles and because the cultural orientation, heritage, identity and origin of the Oku people are Yoruba in essence.

Sherbro people

According to anthropologist Anaïs Ménard, the only Sierra Leonean ethnic group whose culture is similar (in terms of its embrace of Western culture) are westernized members of the Sherbro people. Many Sherbro assimilate as Creoles, as they share the Christian faith and often have similar westernized surnames.

Some of the Sherbro interacted with Portuguese and English traders and intermarried with them in the mid-15th to 18th centuries (producing Afro-European clans such as the Sherbro Tuckers and Sherbro Caulkers). As a result, some of the Sherbro have a more westernized culture than that of other indigenous Sierra Leone ethnic groups.

As Creoles settled in places such as Bonthe for trading and missionary purposes, the Creoles intermarried with westernized Sherbros from as far back as the 18th century.

== Architecture ==
Creole style architecture, circa 1885.

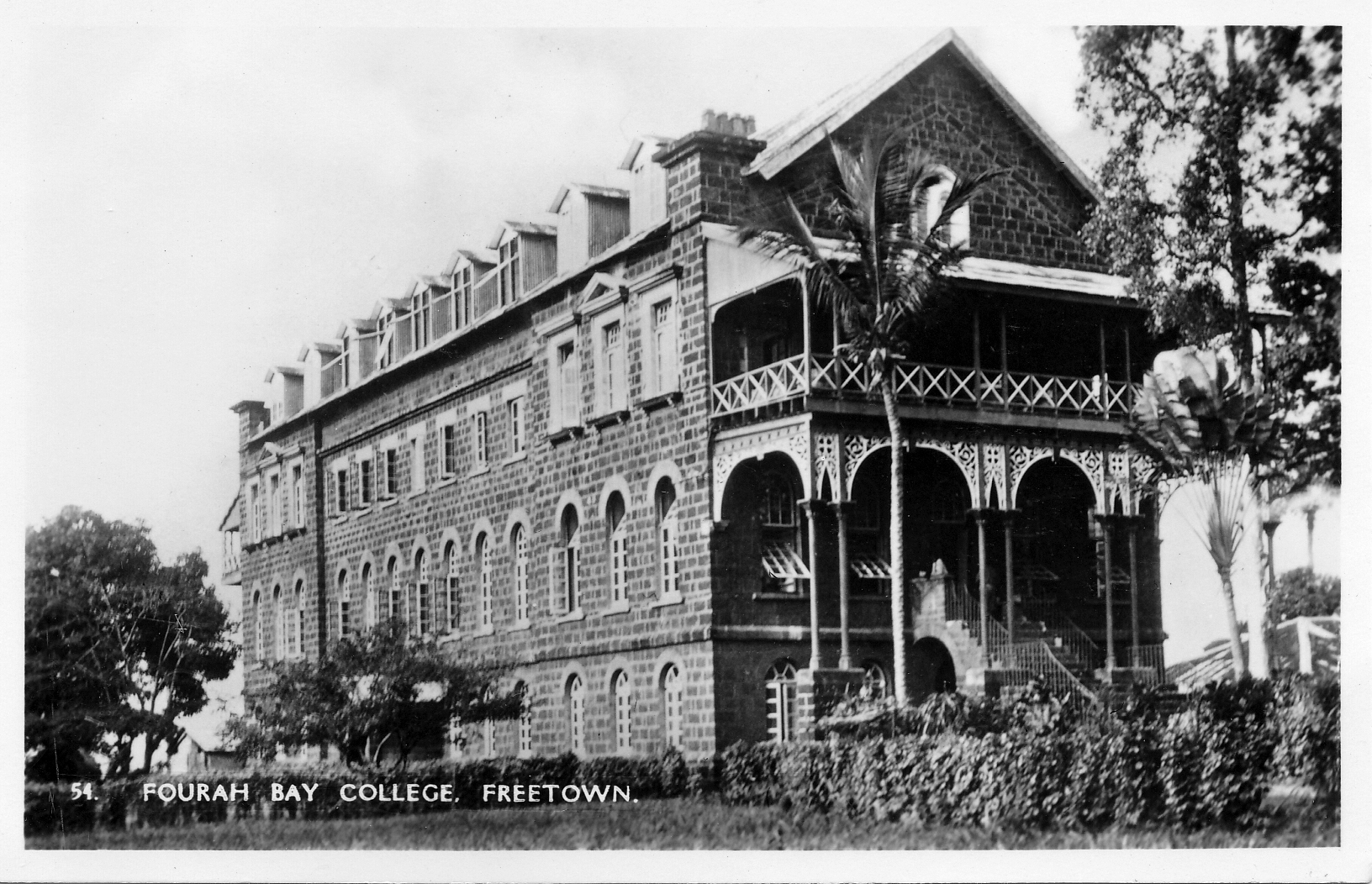
Old Fourah Bay College Building, circa 1930s.

The Creole homeland is a mountainous, narrow peninsula on the coast of west Africa. At its northern tip lies Freetown, the capital. The peninsula's mountain range is covered by tropical rainforests split by deep valleys and adorned with impressive waterfalls. White sand beaches line the Atlantic coast. The whole of Sierra Leone covers some 72,500 square kilometres.

Traditional Creole architecture in the colonial period included a variety of architectural styles ranging and consisting of English-style mansions, smaller to medium stone or brick houses, and traditional one or two-story wooden houses built on stone foundations reminiscent of those found in the Old South, the West Indies or Louisiana.

The distinctive style of Creole wooden or "board" housing was brought by the Settlers from Nova Scotia, and as early as the 1790s, the Nova Scotians had built houses with stone foundations and wooden superstructures, and American-style shingle roofs. However, subsequent African-American and Afro-Caribbean settlers continued to influence Creole architectural styles.

Despite their dilapidated appearance, some of the remaining traditional Creole board houses have a distinctive air, with dormers, box windows, shutters, glass panes, and balconies. The elite live in attractive neighbourhoods such as Hill Station, above Freetown. A large dam in the mountains provides a reliable supply of water and electricity to this area.

== Admixture ==
Creole ethnicities were formed during the European colonial era, from the mass displacement of peoples (Note: The word peoples is specifically used as the plural of people in its sense as a collective singular noun referring to a nation, or tribe, or other community, as in Indigenous Peoples or the many peoples of the world. This usage emphasizes that you're talking about several different specific groups that share a commonality. This can be important for clarity—the many people of the world means something different from the many peoples of the world. In practical terms, using peoples in this way can help to prevent erasure and homogenization of groups that are often lumped together in ways that obscure their specific, complex identities. In this way, the term Indigenous Peoples emphasizes the vast diversity among the world's Indigenous groups while also implying that there are, in fact, separate and distinct groups.) brought into sustained contact with others from different linguistic and cultural backgrounds, who converged onto a colonial territory to which they had not previously belonged. Often involuntarily uprooted from their original home, the settlers were obliged to develop and creatively merge the desirable elements from their diverse backgrounds, to produce new varieties of social, linguistic and cultural norms that superseded the prior forms. This process, known as creolization, is characterized by rapid social flux regularized into Creole ethnogenesis.

Like their Americo-Liberian neighbours, the Creoles of Sierra Leone have varying degrees of European ancestry because some of the settlers were descended from white Americans and other Europeans. Historian David Brion Davis notes the racial mixing that occurred during slavery was frequently attributed by the planter class to the "lower-class White males" but Davis concludes that "there is abundant evidence that many slaveowners, sons of slaveowners, and overseers took black mistresses or in effect raped the wives and daughters of slave families." A famous example was Thomas Jefferson's mistress, Sally Hemings.

After the American Revolutionary War, the Book of Negroes listed approximately 3000 "black and mixed-race" loyalists who sailed from New York City to Nova Scotia in 1783. Additionally, genealogical studies have shown that the majority of free African American families that originated in colonial Virginia and Maryland, descended from white servant women who had children by slaves or free African Americans. Sixty-five percent of those evacuated were from the American South.

Through the Maroons, some Creoles probably also have indigenous Amerindian Taino ancestry. Spanish Jamaica consisted of Spaniards, "natives", enslaved Africans, "black freedmen", mixed-race mulattoes, and those born on the island known as "creole Africans". Genetic studies on the Jamaican Maroons suggest that their ancestry extends beyond Africa, to include Amerindian, European and East Asian progenitors.

On the voyage between Plymouth, England and Sierra Leone, seventy European girlfriends and wives accompanied the Black Poor settlers. There was considerable intermarriage between the Europeans who settled in the colony of Sierra Leone and the various ethnic groups that coalesced into the Creole identity. The settlers generally married endogamously, although individuals from mixed and European groups recorded a much higher proportion of women and men involved in exogamous marriages. Mixed-race individuals intermarried with Europeans and black colonial residents at the same rate as they married their own.

Alongside the Americo-Liberians, the Creoles of Sierra Leone are the only recognised ethnic group of African-American, Liberated African, and Afro-Caribbean descent in West Africa.

== Sierra Leone Creole Diaspora ==
=== Historic diaspora ===
Historically, Creoles spread Christianity and their lingua franca throughout West Africa, and because of this, Sierra Leone Creole communities existed in Nigeria, Ghana, Cameroon, Senegal, Equatorial Guinea and Liberia. Many Creoles traded throughout West Africa, and some settled in new countries.

Liberated Africans and their colony-born children in the early to mid-19th centuries, and subsequently Creoles between the late 19th and early 20th centuries, who settled in Nigeria, were known as Saros, and there is a thriving community there. Sierra Leone Creoles who settled in the Gambia became part of the Aku or Gambian Creole people; they make up an elite community in Gambia. Many recaptives returned to their original homes after being freed in Freetown, as most kept their anglicised names, they took partially new identities back to their homelands.

=== Present-day diaspora ===
As a result of normal immigration patterns, the Sierra Leone Civil War, and some discrimination at home, many Sierra Leone Creoles live abroad in the United States and the United Kingdom. What has been called the "Creole Diaspora" is the migration of Sierra Leone Creoles abroad. Many Creoles attend formal and informal gatherings. A Creole or Krio Heritage Society is based in New York City, with branches in places including Texas.

== Related communities ==
- Black Nova Scotians – ancestors of the Sierra Leone Creoles who fought for their freedom on the side of the British during the American Revolutionary War. Initially resettled in Nova Scotia, they arrived in West Africa where they founded the settlement of Freetown, Sierra Leone in 1792.
- Jamaican Maroons – ancestors of the Sierra Leone Creoles who freed themselves from slavery on the Colony of Jamaica. Initially resettled in Nova Scotia, after the Second Maroon War, they eventually arrived in Freetown in 1800.
- Americo-Liberians – sister ethnic group of the Creoles of Sierra Leone, comprising African Americans, Afro-Caribbeans and Liberated Africans who founded the settlement of Liberia in 1822.
- Gambian Creoles – descendants of the Creoles of Sierra Leone who migrated to The Gambia in the late 19th and early 20th century.
- Saro people (Nigerian Creoles) – sub-ethnic group of the Sierra Leone Creoles who resettled in several Nigerian cities in the late 19th and early 20th century.
- Krio Fernandinos – descendants of the Creoles of Sierra Leone who migrated to Bioko island, Equatorial Guinea in the late 19th century.
- Gold Coast Euro-Africans – extensively intermarried with Sierra Leone Creole migrants in colonial Ghana.

== Notable people of Sierra Leone Creole descent ==
Name	Born	Died	Notability	Ref.	Image
William Vivour	1830	1890	Single most successful 19th-century farmer in Africa		
Davidson Nicol	1925	1994	Discovered the breakdown of insulin in the human body, a breakthrough for the treatment of diabetes		
James Pinson Davies	1828	1906	Pioneer of cocoa farming in West Africa		
John Farrell Easmon (seated, with brother Albert)	1856	1900	Coined the term "Blackwater Fever" and was the first to link the disease directly to malaria		
Christian Frederick Cole	1852	1885	First black graduate of Oxford and first African barrister to practice in the English courts		
Sir Samuel Lewis	1843	1903	First mayor of Freetown and first West African to receive a knighthood		
Idris Elba	1972	—	Actor and winner of the BET and Golden Globe awards		
Stella Jane Thomas	1906	1974	First black African woman called to the Bar in Great Britain and first West African female to qualify as a lawyer		
Samuel Coleridge-Taylor	1875	1912	Composer and conductor known for his three cantatas on the epic 1855 poem The Song of Hiawatha		
Sir Ernest Dunstan Morgan	1896	1979	Pharmaceutical entrepreneur and philanthropist		
Frances Claudia Wright	1919	2010	First Sierra Leonean woman to be called to the Bar in Great Britain and to practice law in Sierra Leone		
Dame Linda Dobbs	1951	—	First non-white High Court judge in Great Britain		
Constance Cummings-John	1918	2000	Educator, politician and first mayoress of Freetown		
Emanuel Adeniyi Thomas	1914	1945	First black African to qualify as a pilot and first Royal Air Force officer of West African origin		
Sir Kitoye Ajasa (born: Edmund Macauley)	1866	1937	Legislator during the colonial period and first Nigerian to receive a knighthood		
Sir Ernest Beoku-Betts	1895	1957	Jurist and one-time mayor of Freetown		
Charles Odamtten Easmon	1913	1994	Performed the first successful open-heart surgery in West Africa		
Sir Henry Lightfoot Boston	1898	1969	First African Governor-General of Sierra Leone		
Christopher Okoro Cole	1921	1990	Chief Justice, later interim Governor-General and President of Sierra Leone		
Samuel Benjamin Thomas	1833	1901	Philanthropist, entrepreneur and one of the richest men in 19th-century Africa		
Adelaide Casely-Hayford	1868	1960	Activist and pioneer of women's education in Sierra Leone		
Lati Hyde-Forster	1911	2001	First female graduate of the oldest western-style university in Africa		
Gladys Casely-Hayford	1904	1950	Playwright and first author to write in the Krio language		
Clifford Nelson Fyle	1933	2006	Author of the Krio-English Dictionary and the Sierra Leone National Anthem		
Sir Émile Fashole-Luke	1895	1980	Chief Justice and Speaker of the House of Parliament of Sierra Leone		
William Broughton Davies	1831	1906	First West African to qualify as a medical doctor		
Dr Claude Nelson-Williams	1927	1989	First Sierra Leonean appointed as Chairman of the Management Committee of the Freetown City Council, physician, politician, and one of the first directors of the Bank of Sierra Leone		
Ulric Emmanuel Jones	1940	2020	First Sierra Leonean neurosurgeon		
Andrew Juxon-Smith	1931	1996	Commander of the armed forces and Head of State of Sierra Leone		
James Africanus Horton	1835	1883	Surgeon, scientist and political thinker who worked towards African independence a century before it occurred		
Agnes Yewande Savage	1906	1964	First West African woman to qualify as a medical doctor		
Murietta Olu-Williams	1923	—	First woman in Africa to achieve the rank of Permanent Secretary in the Civil Service		
Charles Burgess King	1875	1961	Former President of Liberia		
Samuel Ajayi Crowther	1809	1891	Clergyman and first Anglican Bishop of West Africa		
Adesanya Kwamina Hyde	1915	1993	Royal Air Force aviator awarded the Distinguished Flying Cross for acts of valour and courage		
Sir Samuel Bankole-Jones	1911	1981	Chief Justice and first Sierra Leonean president of the Court of Appeal		
Valentine Strasser	1967	—	Army officer and Head of State of Sierra Leone		
John Clavell Smythe	1915	1996	Royal Air Force aviation officer shot down over Nazi Germany, later attorney-general of Sierra Leone		
George Gurney Nicol	1856	1888	Clergyman and first African graduate of Cambridge University		
Sir Salako Benka-Coker	1900	1965	First Sierra Leonean Chief Justice of the Supreme Court		
Napheesa Collier	1996	—	Professional basketball player and gold medallist at the 2020 Summer Olympic Games		
Ryan Giggs	1973	—	Welsh football coach and former player, regarded as one of the greatest players of his generation		
Leonard Benker Johnson	1902	1974	British Empire Boxing champion, considered to be one of the best middleweights of his era.		

== See also ==
- African-American diaspora
- African Americans in Africa
- African Americans in the Revolutionary War
- Atlantic Creole
- Atlantic World
- Back-to-Africa movement
- Birchtown, Nova Scotia
- Black Loyalists
- Book of Negroes
- Creolization
- Church Missionary Society
- The Cotton Tree
- Door of Return
- Dunmore's Proclamation
- Gullah
- Gumbe
- Jamaican Maroon Creole
- History of Sierra Leone
- Outline of Sierra Leone
- Philipsburg Proclamation
- Rough Crossings
- Sierra Leonean nationality law
- Timeline of Freetown
