= Davis family (Sierra Leone) =

The Davis family (variant forms: Davies) was one of the last of the Nova Scotian settler families and though the family has descendants in the United States and Europe, the Davis family was one of the original Black American-Black Nova Scotians families of Sierra Leone, thus part of the Sierra-Leone Creole population.

== Origin ==
The patriarch of the Davis family was Anthony Davis, a 29-year-old, is mentioned in the Book of Negroes. He was a slave owned by Mark Davis on the Delaware River and ran away about 1780. He traveled to Nova Scotia on the ship Mary and also in the Muster list of Birchtown blacks as a farmer.

== Notable descendants ==
- Henry O. Macauley
