= Snowball family (Sierra Leone) =

Prominent settler family

The Snowball family was a prominent settler Creole family of Nova Scotian descent. The Snowballs were originally African-American slaves from "Princess Ann County, Virginia" and were formerly the property of Richard Murray. Nathaniel Snowball, who was the son of Violet Snowball and the brother of Mary Snowball, was only 12 years old when he was recorded in the Book of Negroes and described as a "fine boy. Formerly the property of Richard Murray of Princess Ann County, Virginia; left him 7 years ago". Nathaniel became a prominent settler and the patriarch of the Snowball family in Settler Town, Sierra Leone.

== See also ==
- Blizzard family

== Sources ==
- Quilliam, Abdallah (1 January 1903). "A Chapter in the History of Sierra Leone". Journal of the Royal African Society. 3 (9): 83–99. JSTOR 714668.
- Pybus, C. (2006). Epic Journeys of Freedom: Runaway Slaves of the American Revolution and Their Global Quest for Liberty. Beacon Press. p. 151. ISBN 978-0-8070-5514-4.
- Schama, S. (2006). Rough Crossings: Britain, the Slaves and the American Revolution. HarperCollins. p. 379. ISBN 978-0-06-053916-0.
- Walker, J.W.S.G. (1992). The Black Loyalists: The Search for a Promised Land in Nova Scotia and Sierra Leone, 1783–1870. University of Toronto Press. p. 377. ISBN 978-0-8020-7402-7.
