= Sierra Leonean nationality law =

Sierra Leone Citizenship Act

Parliament of Sierra Leone
- Long title: The Sierra Leone Citizenship Act, (No. 4) of 1973, as amended by the Sierra Leone Citizenship Act Amendment (No. 13) of 1976
- Enacted by: Government of Sierra Leone
- Status: Current legislation

Sierra Leonean nationality law is regulated by the Constitution of Sierra Leone, as amended; the Citizenship Act, and its revisions; and various international agreements to which the country is a signatory. These laws determine who is, or is eligible to be, a national of Sierra Leone. The legal means to acquire nationality, formal legal membership in a nation, differ from the domestic relationship of rights and obligations between a national and the nation, known as citizenship. Nationality describes the relationship of an individual to the state under international law, whereas citizenship is the domestic relationship of an individual within the nation. In Britain and thus the Commonwealth of Nations, though the terms are often used synonymously outside of law, they are governed by different statutes and regulated by different authorities. Sierra Leonean nationality is based on descent from a person who is Black-African, regardless of whether they were born in Sierra Leone, jus soli, or abroad to a Sierra Leonean, jus sanguinis. (Note: According to Bronwen Manby, an expert on African nationality laws, Sierra Leone does not recognise whether the parents are nationals of Sierra Leone for derivative nationality, but instead whether a parent or grandparent was Black-African and born in the territory. This means that a child born to a Sierra Leonean national who was not themselves born in Sierra Leone is ineligible for Sierra Leonean nationality at birth.) The Black clause was inserted based upon the founding of the colony as a refuge for former slaves to prevent economically powerful communities from obtaining political power. It can be granted to persons with an affiliation to the country, or to a permanent resident who has lived in the country for a given period of time through naturalisation.

== Acquisition of nationality ==
Nationality can be acquired in Sierra Leone at birth or later in life through naturalisation.

=== By birth ===
Prior to 2006, persons born in Sierra Leone could only acquire nationality at birth from their Black-African father or a paternal grandparent. The only way they could acquire nationality through a mother was in the event that they would otherwise be stateless. In 2006, children born in Sierra Leone, but not children born abroad, could acquire nationality from their mothers if both the child and the mother or maternal grandparent were Black African and had been born in Sierra Leone. Since 2017, children born abroad are also allowed to derive nationality from their Sierra Leonean mothers. Current Sierra Leonean legislation makes no provision for foundlings or orphans discovered in the territory, or those who would otherwise be stateless to acquire nationality. Those who acquire nationality at birth are children born anywhere to at least one parent or grandparent who was of Negro African descent and was born in Sierra Leone.

=== By naturalisation ===
Naturalisation can be granted to persons who have resided in the territory for a sufficient period of time to confirm they understand the customs and traditions of Sierra Leone and are integrated into the society. General provisions are that applicants must have sufficient knowledge of a language indigenous to the country, be of good character, and capable of making contributions to the growth of Sierra Leone. Persons who are not Black-African applicants must typically have resided in the country for fifteen years; whereas Black-Africans are required to have a continuous residency of eight years. Applicants must be interviewed by administrators from the Criminal Investigation Department, Immigration Headquarters, National Revenue Authority, and a panel composed of the attorney general, head of immigration and ministers of foreign affairs, justice, and trade. Recommendations from these interviews are forwarded to the cabinet and then final approval is made by the President of Sierra Leone. There is no appeal process if an application is refused. Besides foreigners meeting the criteria, other persons who may be naturalised include:

- Juveniles legally adopted by a Sierra Leonean male, at the time of completion of a legal adoption may apply to naturalise as Sierra Leonean; (Note: Laws in Sierra Leone specifically exclude adopted juveniles and their adopters from their legal definitions of filiation, as child and parent. Prior to enactment of the first adoption law for the country (Adoption Act 1989), the legal ties between biological parents and their children were not severed by an adoption. Adoptive parents were not considered to be legal parents and instead were custodial guardians. Under the terms of the 1989 Act, a juvenile and its adopter basically had the same relationship as a legitimate child and a parent; however, women adopters are specifically barred from passing their nationality to children they adopt. As the law specifically precludes adopters from being described as parents, adoptees may have difficulty gaining recognition as nationals.)
- Minor children (under age twenty-one) can be included in their parent's naturalisation petition;
- Children born abroad to Sierra Leonean mothers who were Negro Africans, but whose fathers were not Negro African, as long as their mother continuously maintained Sierra Leonean nationality;
- Persons of Black-African descent who were born in Sierra Leone, to a parent who did not possess diplomatic immunity or was classed as an enemy alien, by virtue of continuously residing in the country for at least eight years; or
- The wife of a Sierra Leonean upon marriage to a Sierra Leonean national or a person of Black-African descent who was born in Sierra Leone after 18 April 1971.

== Loss of nationality ==
Sierra Leonean nationals can renounce their nationality pending approval by the state. Sierra Leoneans of native origin may not lose their nationality. Naturalised persons may be denaturalised in Sierra Leone for disloyalty to the state; for committing crimes against the state or state security; for ordinary serious crimes, especially involving fraud or dishonesty; or for residing outside the country for an extended period of time, typically more than seven years. Persons who previously had nationality and lost it because of past prohibitions for dual nationality may repatriate.

== Dual nationality ==
Since 2006, Sierra Leone has allowed nationals to hold dual nationality.

== History ==
Though no large states developed in the area, chieftainships formed the basis of society and neighbors networked with and interacted for trade, protection and religious rites. Among the peoples whose ancestry were indigenous to present-day Sierra Leone are the Bullom, Kissi, and Krim peoples. In 1364, Jehan li Roanois (alternately called Jean de Rouen), a French merchant and explorer from Normandy, visited Sierra Leone and traveled down to the Gold Coast. The following year, French explorers returned and established a chain of trading stations as far south as the Senegal River. These were abandoned between 1410 and 1413 because of situations in France, including the 14th century plague and Hundred Years' War. From the fifteenth century, Mande-speaking peoples invaded the region, intermarrying with the original inhabitants creating the ethnic groups of the Loko, Mende, and Vai peoples. In 1461, Portuguese explorer Pedro de Sintra sailed to the West African coast, stopping to get water at a place he named Sierra Leone, meaning lion mountain for its rugged appearance. The Portuguese had established a trading fort along the coast by 1495.

In 1505, the Temne people came south from French Guinea into the northern part of Sierra Leone, attacking the Çapez (also known as Sapis), Limba, and Loko people residing there. The Temne conquered and subjugated settlements to the south until they encountered an impenetrable resistance from the Susu people in the northwest and the Mende to the southeast. By the sixteenth century, chieftainships in the region were engaged in the slave trade and had begun to lease land to European slave traders. British trading activities were irregular in the area until 1638, when the charter was renewed for the African Company and a factory site was granted them by the Temne chief Borea. They first settled on Tasso Island, in the Sierra Leone River and then established a headquarters on Bunce Island about eighteen miles from what is now Freetown. From there, by 1651, they began to branch out opening facilities along the Sherbro River and founded Jamaica Town near present-day Bonthe, on Sherbro Island. By the 1650s, Sierra Leone was a regular port of call for British ships to access fresh water and they began negotiating agreements with local chiefs to establish trade.

In 1662, the Company of Royal Adventurers Trading into Africa took over the operations of the financially failing Africa Company. An attack by the Dutch during the Second Anglo-Dutch War in 1664, destroyed all of the British trading forts. When they were returned to Britain, at the end of hostilities by the 1667 Treaty of Breda, but the company was unable to rebuild. It sold the rights to the Royal African Company in 1672. The new company immediately rebuilt the facilities on Bunce Island and at Jamaica Town, but converted the trading post on Tasso to a plantation and sanatorium for the soldiers who operated in Bunce. The abolition of the Royal African Company's monopoly in 1697, left the trading stations susceptible to attacks by the French in 1704, 1719, and 1720. The posts were severely damaged and abandoned by the Company in 1728. During the time that the Royal African Company was operating, the firm of Grant, Sargent and Oswald provisioned the trading stations. When the company abandoned Bunce Island, Sargent and his partners purchased the factory there in 1748, repaired it, and continued to use it to trade in timber. They expanded their operations to Batts, Bobs, Tasso, and Tumbu Islands and along the banks of the river, eventually becoming involved in the slave trade. The firm operated through the end of the eighteenth century.

=== African resettlement schemes (1787–1808) ===
At the end of the American Revolutionary War in 1783, Black soldiers who had fought on the side of the British were sent to the Bahamas, England, and Nova Scotia to be freed. Many of these freedmen ended up poor and destitute. In 1786 Granville Sharp published a plan to resettle these former soldiers in Sierra Leone. He proposed that the Committee for the Relief of the Black Poor, a humanitarian aid society, sponsor a colony. After purchasing a plot of land on the Peninsula of Sierra Leone from the local chiefs, 364 one-acre lots were laid out on the southern side of the river and distributed to colonists in 1787. Illness, deaths of their leaders, a lack of supplies, and threats from native inhabitants caused the colonists to desert the site in 1789. The St. George's Bay Company organised with plans to rescue the settlers and establish a commercial trading venture with the colony. Alexander Falconbridge, the agent for the company set out in 1790 and collected the colonists he could find on Bobs and Bunce Islands. He resettled the sixty-four colonists at Granville Town, after purchasing the land from the local chiefs.

Incorporated in 1791, the St. George's Bay Company became the Sierra Leone Company and was approached by Thomas Peters, a British loyalist and Black soldier who had been resettled in Nova Scotia. Unhappy with the climate there, he asked if he and fellow persons who had been sent to Nova Scotia could be resettled in Sierra Leone. As a result, 1,196 people left from Nova Scotia and arrived in Sierra Leone in 1792. Sixty-five of the passengers died en route, but arrived to found Freetown (initially Free Town) on 16 March 1792. By 1799, the settlers were discontented with the rule of the Sierra Leone Company and broke into open rebellion, appointing their own judges and refusing to pay rent to the company. That year the Sierra Leone Company drafted a charter, to reduce the authority of the police, known as Hundredors and Tythingmen, limiting them to the role of constables. While the police were to be elected by the colonists, the Company retained the right to veto candidates. The charter also established a court system, governor and council, and a local militia.

At the end of the Second Maroon War (1795–1796) in Jamaica, Britain deported many of those who had participated in the revolt to Nova Scotia. By 1799, a decision was made to transport the Maroons from Halifax to Sierra Leone. They arrived the following year and were settled in Granville Town. The Maroons immediately joined the British militia in suppressing the rebelling colonists, crushing the unrest in 1800. Failing to generate enough income from trade to expand and support the colony, or protect it from raids of the native tribes, and the looming British law abolishing the slave trade, in 1807, the Sierra Leone Company asked to be released from its charter and for the government to take over the administration of the colony.

=== British colony and protectorate (1808–1961) ===
The Sierra Leone Colony was established as a crown colony in 1808 from the Settlement of Freetown. Britain continued to transport freedmen to Sierra Leone until 1824, specifically settling all Recaptives, slaves who had been liberated from slave ships, in Freetown. In 1815, a group of thirty-eight settlers came with Paul Cuffe, an African-American businessman and sea captain. Britain also relocated two disbanded West Indian regiments and transported slaves from Barbados who had rebelled in 1819. The disparate backgrounds of the settlers in the colony, soon forged into a community with its own culture and identity, merging European, African, West Indian and Muslim cultural norms to form their own distinctive Krio ethnicity and language. The colony was expanded along the coast until 1886 to include Sherbro Island and the southern Freetown Peninsula. In 1885 Britain concluded a treaty with Liberia to establish the southern border and in 1895 it signed an agreement with France to establish the northern boundary of Sierra Leone and French Guinea. In 1896, the interior lands were proclaimed the Sierra Leone Protectorate.

In Britain, allegiance, in which subjects pledged to support a monarch, was the precursor to the modern concept of nationality. The crown recognised from 1350 that all persons born within the territories of the British Empire were subjects. Those born outside the realm — except children of those serving in an official post abroad, children of the monarch, and children born on a British ship — were considered by common law to be foreigners. Marriage did not affect the status of a subject of the realm, but under common law, single women, including divorcées, were not allowed to be parents thus their children could not derive nationality maternally and were stateless unless legitimated by their father. British Nationality Acts did not extend beyond the bounds of the United Kingdom of Great Britain and Ireland, meaning that under Britain's rules of conquest, laws in place at the time of acquisition remained in place until changed. Other than common law, there was no standard statutory law which applied for subjects throughout the realm, meaning different jurisdictions created their own legislation for local conditions, which often conflicted with the laws in other jurisdictions in the empire. Thus, a person who was naturalised in Canada, for example, would be considered a foreigner, rather than a British national, in Australia or South Africa. When British protectorates were established in 1815, there was little difference between the rights of British subjects and protected persons.

In 1844, a Naturalisation Act was passed creating an administrative process, whereby the Secretary of State could naturalise applicants by collecting a fee and administering an Oath of Allegiance. The 1844 Act made no provisions for minor children, but it required a married woman to derive her status from her British husband. Thus, if a foreign woman's husband was native-born or naturalised, she automatically was British. British-born women maintained their status as British subjects, even if married to foreign men, under the 1844 statute. Because of confusion, an amendment was passed in 1847, confirming that the 1844 Act did not extend to British colonies. In 1853, under the terms of the Liberated Africans Act, clarification was made that all persons who had been former slaves and were liberated settlers in the Colony were British subjects and the all other inhabitants of British Sierra Leone were British Protected Persons.

In 1870. a revision to the Naturalisation Act required the automatic loss of nationality for British women upon marriage with a foreigner, regardless of whether she became stateless from the denaturalisation. She could re-acquire British nationality only by application for naturalisation, after the death of her spouse. The 1870 Act stipulated that minor children be automatically denaturalised if their father, or a widowed mother, lost their British nationality or naturalised in another country. As single women, including divorcées, under common law were not allowed to be parents, under the Act, their children could not derive nationality maternally. Naturalised British fathers, or widows, could not pass on their nationality to children born abroad, even if the parent was in service abroad to the crown. As with previous nationality acts, the legislation did not extend beyond the bounds of the United Kingdom of Great Britain and Ireland. An amendment was made in the Naturalisation Act of 1895 to revise the section dealing with these children's automatic derivative naturalisation.

==== British-born and Krio persons in the Sierra Leone Colony and Protectorate (1914–1960) ====
In 1911, at the Imperial Conference a decision was made to draft a common nationality code for use across the empire. The British Nationality and Status of Aliens Act 1914 allowed local jurisdictions in the British self-governing territories to continue regulating nationality in their jurisdictions, but also established an imperial nationality scheme for use throughout the realm. Under its terms, common law provisions were reiterated for natural-born persons born within the realm on or after the effective date. By using the word person, the statute nullified legitimacy requirements for jus soli nationals, meaning an illegitimate child could derive nationality from its mother. For those born abroad on or after the effective date, legitimacy was still required, and nationality could only be derived by a child from a British father (one generation), who was natural-born or naturalised. It also provided that a married woman derived her nationality from her spouse, meaning if he was British, she was also, and if he was foreign, so was she. It stipulated that upon loss of nationality of a husband, a wife could declare that she wished to remain British. It allowed that if a marriage had terminated, through death or divorce, a British-born national who had lost her status through marriage could reacquire British nationality through naturalisation without meeting a residency requirement. The statute specified that a five-year residency or service to the crown was required for naturalisation.

Amendments to the British Nationality Act were enacted in 1918, 1922, 1933 and 1943 changing derivative nationality by descent and modifying slightly provisions for women to lose their nationality upon marriage. Because of a rise in statelessness, a woman who did not automatically acquire her husband's nationality upon marriage or upon his naturalisation in another country, did not lose her British status after 1933. The 1943 revision allowed a child born abroad at any time to be a British national by descent if the Secretary of State agreed to register the birth. Under the terms of the British Nationality Act 1948 British nationals in the Sierra Leone Colony were reclassified at that time as "Citizens of the UK and Colonies" (CUKC). The basic British nationality scheme did not change overmuch, and typically those who were previously defined as British subjects remained the same. Changes included that wives and children no longer automatically acquired the status of the husband or father, children who acquired nationality by descent no longer were required to make a retention declaration, and registrations for children born abroad were extended.

==== Indigenous persons (British Protected Persons) in the Sierra Leone Colony and Protectorate (1914–1960) ====
British protectorates, in 1914, were considered to be foreign territories lacking an internal government. When Britain extended this status over a territory, it took responsibility for both internal and external administration, including defence and foreign relations. Indigenous persons who were born in a protectorate were known as British Protected Persons and were not entitled to be British nationals. BPPs had no right of return to the United Kingdom and were unable to exercise rights of citizenship; however, they could be issued a passport and could access diplomatic services when traveling abroad. In 1914, the Alien Restriction Act clarified that while BPPs were not nationals, neither were they aliens. When the law was amended in 1919, that provision remained the same, meaning that BPPs could not naturalise. Until 1934, when the British Protected Persons Order was drafted, the status of BPP was not statutory, but rather granted at the prerogative of the monarch. Under the 1934 Order, Belonger status with regard to protected territories was defined to mean persons born before or after the Order in a protectorate who possessed no nationality and were not a British subject, or persons born abroad to a native of a protectorate who were stateless and not British subjects. The statute extended BPP status to children and wives of BPPs, if they were stateless, and specifically provided that if a woman married someone who was a national of another nation, she lost her BPP status.

In 1943, the British Nationality Act clarified that BPPs born abroad in territories that were within the Crown's dominions were British subjects by virtue of jus soli, but those born within a protectorate were not subjects. Under the terms of the British Nationality Act 1948, the nationality status of BPPs of the Sierra Leone Colony and Protectorate did not change. However, the Act, while retaining the provisions that BPPs were not aliens and could not naturalise, allowed BPPs to register as a BPP of a protected place or as a British subject under certain conditions. In 1949, the British Protectorates, Protected States and Protected Persons Order in Council repealed former orders about BPPs and detailed provisions for conferring protected status. It provided that protected persons were BPPs of a protectorate if they were born there; if they were born abroad to a father who was a native of a protectorate; or if at the time of their birth their father was a BPP. It also allowed women married to BPPs to register as a BPP and allowed certain nationals of foreign countries to register as BPPs. Minor changes to protected persons' status were made by Orders of Council in 1952, 1953, 1958, 1960, 1961, and 1962, but major changes did not occur until 1965.

==== Transition to independence (1946–1960) ====
In 1946, an Assembly for the Protectorate was inaugurated with the purpose of preparing the Protectorate for integration with the Colony through governing under the Westminster Parliamentary model. Those who served in the Protectorate Assembly were paramount chiefs, native authorities, and educated elites and its role was to be an advisory body to the Legislative Assembly of the colony. Initially the creation of the Protectorate Assembly was looked upon with enthusiasm by the Krio population of the colony, but within a year, a constitution was drafted which gave the Protectorate thirteen seats and the Colony seven seats on the Legislative Council, giving the majority to the Protectorate. Because of the illiteracy of the chiefs, a furor erupted among the Krio population. The Krios had been instrumental in pressing for a constitution to strip the colonial administration of its power and felt betrayed that they were to remain without power and that BPPs would wield more power over them, as they were British subjects.

As a result, in 1952, the Krios formed the Settlers' Descendants' Union. The aim of the organisation, led by elites, but made up of predominantly lower-, middle-, and working-class people, was to gain independence for the Colony, separately from the Sierra Leone Protectorate. Rapid modernisation, coupled with bureaucratic incompetence, led to a General Strike in 1955 in the Protectorate and a tax revolt in 1956. In 1957, a new constitution was drafted providing for the legislature to be expanded to fifty-seven seats. These included two nominated members, four ex-officio members, twelve elected paramount chiefs, fourteen elected colonial members, and twenty-five members elected from the Protectorate, leaving the majority again to the Protectorate. In 1959, the Settlers' Union proposed that the Colony adopt a constitution for self-governance, reorganise a new Assembly and establish an executive council headed by the Governor. The Colonial Office rejected the plan for separate independence of the Colony and forged ahead with a Constitutional Conference in 1960.

That year the Settlers' Descendants' Union filed suit in the British courts to have the constitutional draft of independence declared in breach of the legal authority and the trust created in 1788 between the Crown and the settlers. Under the Treaty of 1788 between Temne king Naimbana and the Crown's representative, Captain John Taylor, the land purchased for the freedman was to be theirs forever with Britain serving as their trustee. They also argued that they had already gained independence from the rest of British Sierra Leone on the basis of the 1791 Charter. In 1963, the British Court argued that the Settlers' Union represented only their membership, approximately one per cent of the Krios population and the entire Krio population was a minority of only about a quarter of the total inhabitants of Sierra Leone. While very aware of the British attachment of the Krios and their acceptance of British institutions and traditions, in 1964, Justice Richard Wilberforce of the High Court of Justice ruled against the Settlers' Union.

=== Post-independence (1961–present) ===
On 27 April 1961, Sierra Leone became independent. The 1961 Constitution merged the Colony and Protectorate's administrative units and established that former BPPs were no longer considered as aliens in the former Colony. Under its terms, on independence day, those who had formerly been CUKCs or BPPs in the Sierra Leone Colony and Protectorate and had been born in the territory to parents or grandparents also born in the territory were conferred the nationality of Sierra Leone. It also conferred nationality upon persons born abroad, if upon independence their father became, or would have become except that he died, a national of Sierra Leone. Upon becoming Sierra Leonean nationals, persons immediately lost their status as British. Dual nationality was prohibited but provisions were made for those such as the large Lebanese population to retain their British nationality. Wives and persons who had formerly been registered or naturalised in the colony did not acquire nationality but could apply to be registered as Sierra Leonean until 27 April 1963.

Persons born after independence, acquired nationality by being born in the country, regardless of their ethnic or racial identity as long as their father was not an enemy alien or had diplomatic immunity. Children born abroad to a father who was Sierra Leonean at the time of the child's birth also automatically obtained nationality. Under the Sierra Leone Constitution Amendment Act (No.2) 1962, the rights of non-Negro Sierra Leoneans were restricted. Changes included that the transitional period for registration was limited to those who had a father or grandfather who had been born in Sierra Leone, introduction of a retroactive clause that only persons of Negro African descent could acquire nationality either before or after independence, and removal of the requirement that a father not have diplomatic immunity or be an enemy alien. It removed the nationality of anyone who was not Negro-African and who had acquired nationality under the 1961 Constitution. It also specified that children could not automatically acquire nationality from their mother, even if she was a Negro-African, unless the child's father or grandfather was Negro African. If the Sierra Leonean mother was Negro African, a child born in the country could apply for registration, but authorities had the choice of deciding whether nationality would be granted. Multiracial people were only given the option to naturalise.

In 1971, a new constitution was drafted changing Sierra Leone to a republic, but it did not contain provisions to gain nationality. The Sierra Leone Citizenship Act, (No. 4) drafted in 1973, persons born to a Negro African father or grandfather, who was a resident and not a national of any other state at independence was a Sierra Leonean of native origin, as were those born in the territory after independence to a Negro African father or grandfather. Persons born abroad before or after independence to a Negro African father or grandfather who was or would have been a national at independence except for death were also considered nationals from birth. Children born to a Sierra Leonean mother, who had not acquired other nationality and was herself a child of a Negro African father or grandfather, could only acquire nationality at birth from their mother if they would be stateless. Persons who could be naturalised included wives of Sierra Leoneans, persons who were Negro African and born in the territory to a father who did not have diplomatic immunity and was not an enemy alien, and foreign persons who were of Negro African descent who had resided in the country for eight years. There was also a provision for minor children of naturalised parents to acquire nationality through naturalisation. Dual nationality was forbidden, except for children who had been born with multiple nationalities, but they were required to renounce foreign nationality by age twenty-two or they would be denaturalised. The 1973 Act introduced renunciation of nationality and denaturalisation processes.

The Sierra Leone Citizenship Act Amendment (No. 13) of 1976 allowed foreign persons who did not have Negro African ancestors to naturalise after a residency period of at least fifteen years. In 1978, Sierra Leone adopted a new constitution which established a one-party state, and endorsed the existing nationality scheme. A return to a multi-party state was adopted under the 1991 Constitution, but there were no provisions in it regarding nationality or the existing Citizenship Acts. That year a Civil War ensued and in 1992 a coup d'état dissolved the government, replacing it with the National Provisional Ruling Council. The Council proposed amending the constitution and began work on a draft which was published in 1994. The draft would have allowed eliminating ethnicity and race from the qualifications for nationality, allowing any person born to ordinary fifteen-year or more residents of Sierra Leone to acquire nationality at birth, and providing equal access to naturalization. But because of continued civil war, the reforms were never implemented.

A peace agreement was finally signed in 1999 and in 2002 the conflict ended after a United Nations Peacekeeping Force arrived. In 2006, the Sierra Leone Citizenship Amendment Act (No. 11) was passed. It eliminated gender bias for derivative nationality except for children born abroad, replacing the words father and grandfather with father or mother and grandparents. Under its terms, adoptees could acquire nationality from a male adopter, but only from their natural mother. In addition, the amendment allowed dual nationality and repatriation for the first time and added a clause for denaturalisation on the basis of someone who might pose a threat to the nation or common good. However, it also introduced a method of challenging denaturlisation proceedings. In 2007, the government passed the Child's Rights Act (No. 7), which protected all children's right to obtain nationality and the right to know their natural parents. Though the Act does not provide an automatic path to nationality for orphans or foundlings, a foundling who speaks a local language and is of Negro African descent might be able to use it to acquire nationality. In 2017, the Citizenship Act was amended to allow women to transmit their nationality to their children born abroad.
