= Arthur Porter (historian) =

Creole professor, historian, and author (1924–2019)

Professor Arthur Porter
- Born: Arthur Thomas Daniel Porter III; 27 October 1924; Freetown, British Sierra Leone
- Died: 26 March 2019 (aged 95); Ottawa, Canada
- Education: Fourah Bay College, Selwyn College, Cambridge, Boston University
- Occupations: Historian, sociologist

Arthur Thomas Daniel Porter III (26 January 1924 – 26 March 2019) was a Creole professor, historian, and author. His book on the Sierra Leone Creole people, Creoledom: A study of the development of Freetown society, examines their society in a way in which few books of their time period had, and it is one of the most quoted books on the Creoles. He was published in East Africa and the UK.

== Early life ==
Arthur Porter was born in January 1924 in Freetown, British Sierra Leone, to Guy Hardesty Porter and Adina Porter. Guy Porter was an electrical engineer who was a civil servant at the time of his death. Adelina Porter was a school teacher at the Freetown Secondary School for Girls, which was attended by Porter's sister, Iyatunde Harriet Maria Palmer (née Porter). Porter attended the Cathedral School in Freetown.

== Background ==
Like many Creoles, Porter was of West Indian, Jamaican Maroon, Liberated African, and Nova Scotian settler descent. His paternal grandfather was Arthur Thomas Porter I (1834–1908), a successful Creole businessman of West Indian and Jamaican Maroon parentage.

The father of A. T. Porter I was Guy Porter, a West Indian immigrant to Sierra Leone via England, who became a headman of Kent Village. Guy Porter married a Maroon colonist. The Porter family house owned by A. T. Porter I was at No. 11 Wilberforce Street in the heart of Settler Town and near Zion Methodist Church.

Porter was also of "Settler" or Nova Scotian stock, by way of a Virginian ancestor who had arrived in Sierra Leone via Nova Scotia. The Virginian had occupied a house in what the Nova Scotians called Settler Town, Sierra Leone, and was one of the founders of Freetown.

== Education ==
Porter was educated at the Freetown Secondary School for Girls before proceeding to Fourah Bay College and obtaining his bachelor's degree. He subsequently obtained a bachelor's degree in history from Selwyn College, Cambridge, before earning his doctorate in sociology at Boston University.

== Personal life ==
Porter married a woman from Denmark and they had three children, Guy, Arthur and Emma. He is the grandfather of four girls, Gemma, Fiona, Adina and Charlotte. He lived in Ottawa, Ontario, Canada, and he made frequent trips back to his homeland, Sierra Leone. Porter's son, Arthur Porter IV, was a Canadian physician and former Director General (CEO) of the McGill University Health Centre.

Porter died on 26 March 2019 in Ottawa.

== Legacy ==
Porter's work on Sierra Leonean history is considered to be among the most scholarly work done on the people of his native Sierra Leone. Porter's analysis of the stratification of Creole society is considered the most authoritative work on the development of Creole society, and most scholars reference his book when researching the Creole people. The work he accomplished during his tenure at Fourah Bay College has made many look upon Porter as one in the mould of historian Christopher Fyfe, Professor Eldred D. Jones, Professor Akintola J. G. Wyse, and linguist Leo Spitzer.

After leaving his post as Vice-Principal of Fourah Bay College, Porter moved to East Africa and became Principal of the University College, Nairobi, one of the three colleges of the University of East Africa. His term there ended in 1970.
