= Kongossa =

African term for rumors or word of mouth

Kongossa (sometimes spelled congosa) is a popular term originating from Cameroon referring to public rumors, word of mouth and neighborhood gossip. This term is also used in Ghana, Ivory Coast, Equatorial Guinee, as well in English, in French and in Pidgin, and in the Krio language of Sierra Leone. In a general climate of mistrust of public and private media, kongossa remains one of the main sources of information for Cameroon. Kongossa may also be understood as the modern urban equivalent of traditional African palaver, a mechanism which affirms social ties through exchange of neighborhood news.

== History ==
The word originates from Konkonsa in Akan language which is spoken in both Ghana and Ivory Coast.
