= Maroon Town =

Maroon Town may refer to:

- Maroon Town, Jamaica, a settlement
- Maroon Town, Sierra Leone, a district of Freetown
