= St. John's Maroon Church =

Coordinates: 8.4858°N 13.2366°W

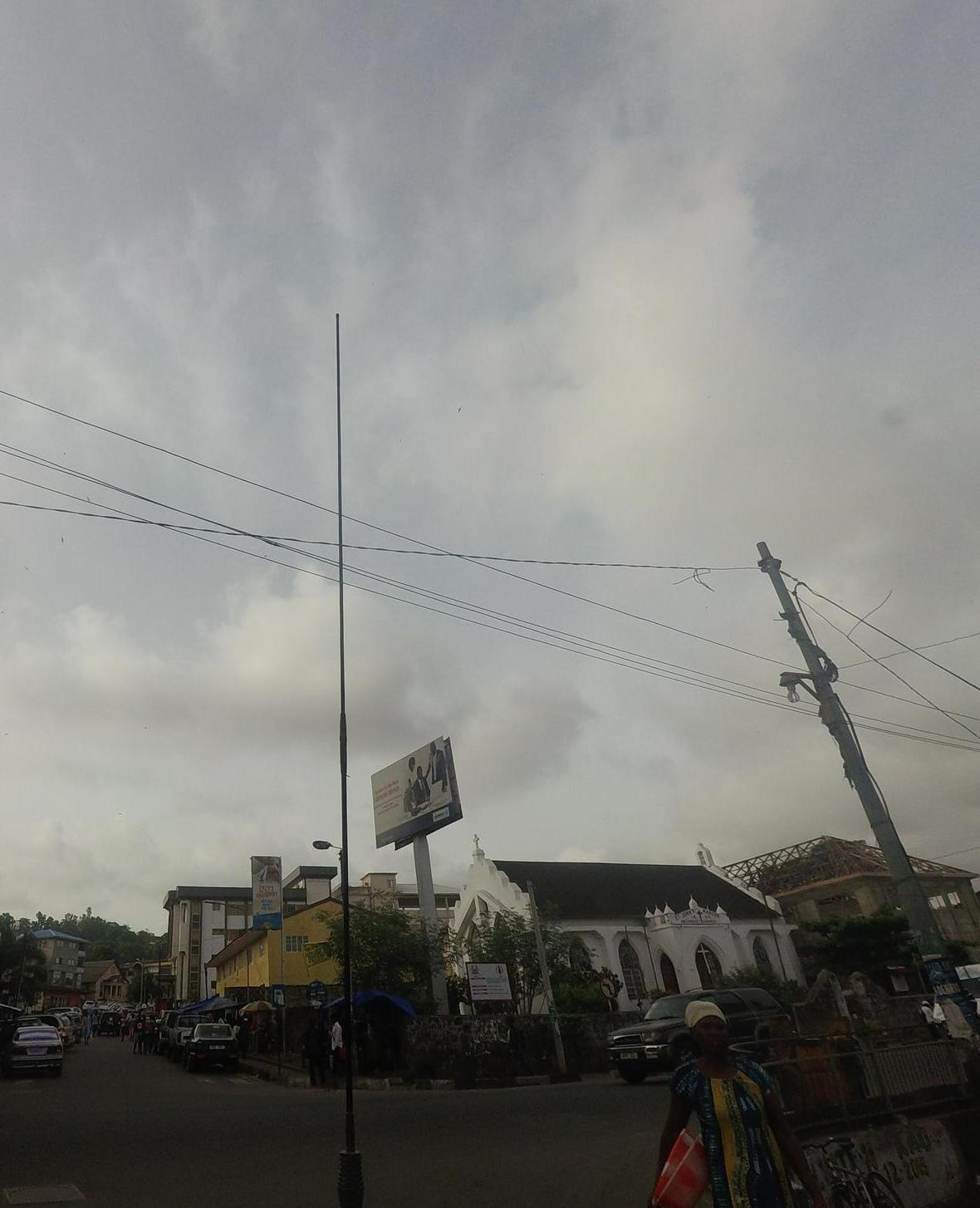
St. John's Maroon Church in Freetown

St. John's Maroon Church is a Methodist church located in Maroon Town, a district of Freetown, the capital of Sierra Leone. It is one of the oldest churches in the country.

The Jamaican Maroons were men, women and children, originating from Jamaica who had surrendered at the end of the Second Maroon War. They had been deported to Nova Scotia by the colonial authorities in 1796. They were then transported to Freetown in 1800, where their opportune arrival and assistance enabled the authorities put down a rebellion by some of the Nova Scotian Settlers, the founders of Freetown. They settled in an area that became known as Maroon Town.

The Maroons gradually gave up their African beliefs and converted to Christianity. In 1820, they received a grant of land between Percival and Liverpool Street in Maroon Town. Uncomfortable worshiping in Nova Scotian chapels, a group led by Charles Shaw built St. John's Maroon Church in 1822. It is a small white building surrounded by a low white wall.

While the Maroons gradually integrated into Freetown society, many of them continued to attend the church. They followed their own brand of Methodism and maintained their independence of the Methodist establishment until 1900. The congregation has dwindled, but still survives. The 200th anniversary of the founding of the congregation of St John's Maroon Church was celebrated in 2007.

The church was declared a national heritage site in 1956 under the Monuments and Relics Ordinance of 1 June 1947.
