= Murietta Olu-Williams =

Sierra Leonean civil servant (born 1923)

Murietta Patricia Olu-Williams, OBE (née Metzger; born 15 December 1923) was a Sierra Leonean civil servant, the first woman in Africa to achieve the rank of Permanent Secretary in the Civil Service.

== Life ==
Murietta Olu-Williams was born on 15 December 1923, the only daughter of Dr. G. N. Metzger, a Freetown doctor of Creole heritage. She was educated at the Freetown Secondary School for Girls, where she was a pupil of Hannah Benka-Coker.

In 1950 she joined the Civil Service as a supervising teacher for the Sierra Leonean Ministry of Education. In 1962 she transferred from the professional to the administrative service, becoming the first female Permanent Secretary. She served in three ministries in this capacity. While at the Ministry of Transport and Communication, she pioneered the creation of parastatals: the Road Transport Co-operation and the Sierra Leone Ports Authority.

In 1966 she was awarded an OBE for her services as Permanent Secretary in the Ministry of Transport and Communications. On 25 August 1969 she was admitted to the Middle Temple.
