= Maroon Town, Sierra Leone =

Maroon Town, Sierra Leone, is a district in the settlement of Freetown, a colony founded in West Africa by Great Britain.

== History ==
Following their defeat in the American Revolutionary War, the British had resettled African Americans in the British colony of Nova Scotia (now a province of Canada). However, many did not like the colder climate and poor treatment they received, so in 1792 about 1200 to 1800 of them emigrated to Sierra Leone. This move was welcomed by the Sierra Leone Company, which wanted to reestablish a colony, but lacked colonists. Once there, the Nova Scotian Settlers (as they came to be called) and Sierra Leone Company surveyors founded Freetown.

A second group, the Jamaican Maroons, originally numbering just under 600 men, women and children who had surrendered following the Second Maroon War in Jamaica, were transported to Nova Scotia in 1796. In 1800, unhappy with their new home, 550 Maroons emigrated to Freetown. The Nova Scotian Settlers had sought to obtain better treatment and more power, clashing constantly with the colonial governors and the Sierra Leone Company since first setting foot in the colony in 1792, but the timely arrival of the "battle-tested" Maroons and a detachment of 45 soldiers and two officers aboard the ship Asia enabled the authorities to put down a rebellion by some of the Nova Scotian Settlers and win the power struggle. Three rebels were tried and executed, and the other 33 or 34 prisoners were banished. The Maroons were granted land west of Settler Town, between Walpole Street and King Tom, which became known as Maroon Town.

In 1822, uncomfortable worshipping in Nova Scotian chapels, the Maroons built the Methodist St. John's Maroon Church, in the centre of Maroon Town.

By the 1830s, the Maroons had integrated into Freetown society and become a part of the Sierra Leone Creole people.

== See also ==
- Jamaican Maroons in Sierra Leone
