= Sierra Leonean English =

Dialect of English

- Region: Sierra Leone
- Language family: Indo-European: Germanic; West Germanic; Ingvaeonic; Anglo-Frisian; Anglic; English; British English & African English; Sierra Leonean English
- Early forms: Proto-Indo-European: Proto-Germanic; Old English; Middle English; Early Modern English; 19th century British English
- Writing system: Latin (English alphabet); Unified English Braille

Official status
- Official language in: Sierra Leone

Language codes
- ISO 639-3: –
- Glottolog: sout3331

Sierra Leonean English is the dialect of English spoken by Sierra Leoneans which has been heavily influenced by the Sierra Leone Creole people.

== Pronunciation ==
Sierra Leonean English realises /r/ as a voiced uvular fricative [ʁ], or, more rarely, a uvular trill [ʀ]. This is rare among accents of English.

== See also ==
- Krio language, an English-based creole language originally spoken by the Sierra Leone Creole people in Sierra Leone and today the country's main lingua franca.
- Northumbrian burr, a feature of northern English which also has a uvular pronunciation of /r/

== Bibliography ==
- Collins, Beverley; Mees, Inger M. (2013) [First published 2003], Practical Phonetics and Phonology: A Resource Book for Students (3rd ed.), Routledge, ISBN 978-0-415-50650-2
- Ladefoged, Peter; Maddieson, Ian (1996). The Sounds of the World's Languages. Oxford: Blackwell. ISBN 0-631-19815-6.
