= Rawdon Street Methodist Church =

Church in Sierra Leone

Rawdon Street Methodist Church is a Methodist historical church in what was the historical Settler Town, Sierra Leone which is now known as Freetown, Sierra Leone. Rawdon Methodist was established by African American settlers in Sierra Leone who are known in Freetown as the 'Nova Scotian Settlers'. The first minister at the church was Joseph Brown; George Carrol (Carral) and Isom Gordon assisted him with running the church. Rawdon was supported built and supported by the Nova Scotians.

== Style of worship ==
The Nova Scotian settlers brought their "American" style of worship to Sierra Leone, much to the chagrin of the British entrepreneurs who brought them there. The Nova Scotian Settlers' style of worship, preaching, and teaching were based upon the African American culture they brought with them to Sierra Leone.

== Wealth and independence ==
Rawdon Methodist was a church for the wealthy Nova Scotian Settlers and often the settlers of a lower status went to Baptist churches in Sierra Leone. Thus Baptist churches were associated with low economic Nova Scotians and the Methodist churches were associated with wealthy merchant Nova Scotian traders.

== Ebenezer Methodist Church ==
Ebenezer Methodist Church was established by Nova Scotian Settlers who broke away from the Rawdon Street congregation after a dispute. Ebenezer was established by wealthy Nova Scotian settler merchants.
