= Ebenezer Methodist Church =

Church in Freetown, Sierra Leone

Coordinates: 8.4852°N 13.2303°W

Ebenezer Methodist Church is an historical Methodist church based in Freetown, Sierra Leone. It was founded by the original African American founders of the Colony of Sierra Leone. Ebenezer Primary School was located in the basement of the church. Ebenezer was founded by wealthy Nova Scotian settler merchants who had broken away from the Rawdon Street Methodist Church following a dispute.

== Sources ==
- Garvey, M.; Hill, R.A. (1995). The Marcus Garvey and Universal Negro Improvement Association Papers, Vol. IX: Africa for the Africans June 1921-December 1922. University of California Press. p. 524. ISBN 9780520916821.
