= Sierra Leone Ministry of Education =

Government ministry of Sierra Leone

Agency overview
- Formed: 1960
- Jurisdiction: Government agency
- Headquarters: New Eangland, Freetown, Sierra Leone
- Agency executive: David Moinina Sengeh, Minister of Education; Deputy Minister of Education
- Parent agency: Government of Sierra Leone

Sierra Leone Ministry of Education is a Ministerial department of the Government of Sierra Leone that is in charge of planning, overseeing, and implementing the educational policies of Sierra Leone . The Ministry of Education advises the President of Sierra Leone and the Government of Sierra Leone on issues related to Education. The Ministry has its headquarters in the capital Freetown .

The Sierra Leone Ministry of Education is headed by the Minister of Education. As of 2021, the current Sierra Leone Minister of Education is David Moinina Sengeh.

== Roles and responsibilities ==
The Sierra Leone Ministry of Education responsibilities include:

- Implementing the Sierra Leone Education System
- Overseeing the Sierra Leone Education System
- Planning the Sierra Leone Education System
- Set up policies and regulations for the Sierra Leone Education System
- Handles the Sierra Leone Education Ministry budget
- Manages all government Universities and government colleges in Sierra Leone
- Manages all government schools in Sierra Leone (including government primary schools, government junior secondary schools, government secondary schools and government schools for the disables
- Ensure accurate, proper and timely monthly payment of all government employees in the Sierra Leone Education System (including monthly payment of principals, teachers, professors and school administrators
- Investigate fraud in the Sierra Leone Education System
- Set up policies and regulations of all private schools in Sierra Leone (including private universities)
- Ensure all government schools and private schools follow the planning and regulation of the Sierra Leone Education System
- Ensure every child who has got to the minimum school age, attends school
- Prioritise to drop the illiteracy rate in Sierra Leone
- Prioritise to increase the literacy rate in Sierra Leone
- Gives out academic scholarship to certain students who have met the requirements, to study within Sierra Leone or outside of Sierra Leone
- Responsible for the safety and security of all students in Sierra Leone government schools
- Keeps record of all current and former students in the Sierra Leone Public Schools
- Manages government schools feeding program
- Manages government schools physical health program
- Manages government schools broadcasting
- Manages government schools official sporting competition, journalism and other official Extracurricular activities

== Organisations ==
The Sierra Leone Ministry of Education is headed by the Minister of Education, who is the overall head of the Sierra Leone Ministry of Education. The current Minister of Education is David Moinina Sengeh. The current Minister of Education is assisted by one Deputy Minister of Education; and . Below the Minister of Education and Deputy Minister of Education is the chief education officer. Each One of Sierra Leone's fourteen District is headed by a deputy director who reports to and works under the supervision of the Sierra Leone Minister of Education and the two deputy ministers of Education, and the chief education officer .
