= Nova Scotian Settlers =

Historical ethnic group that settled Sierra Leone

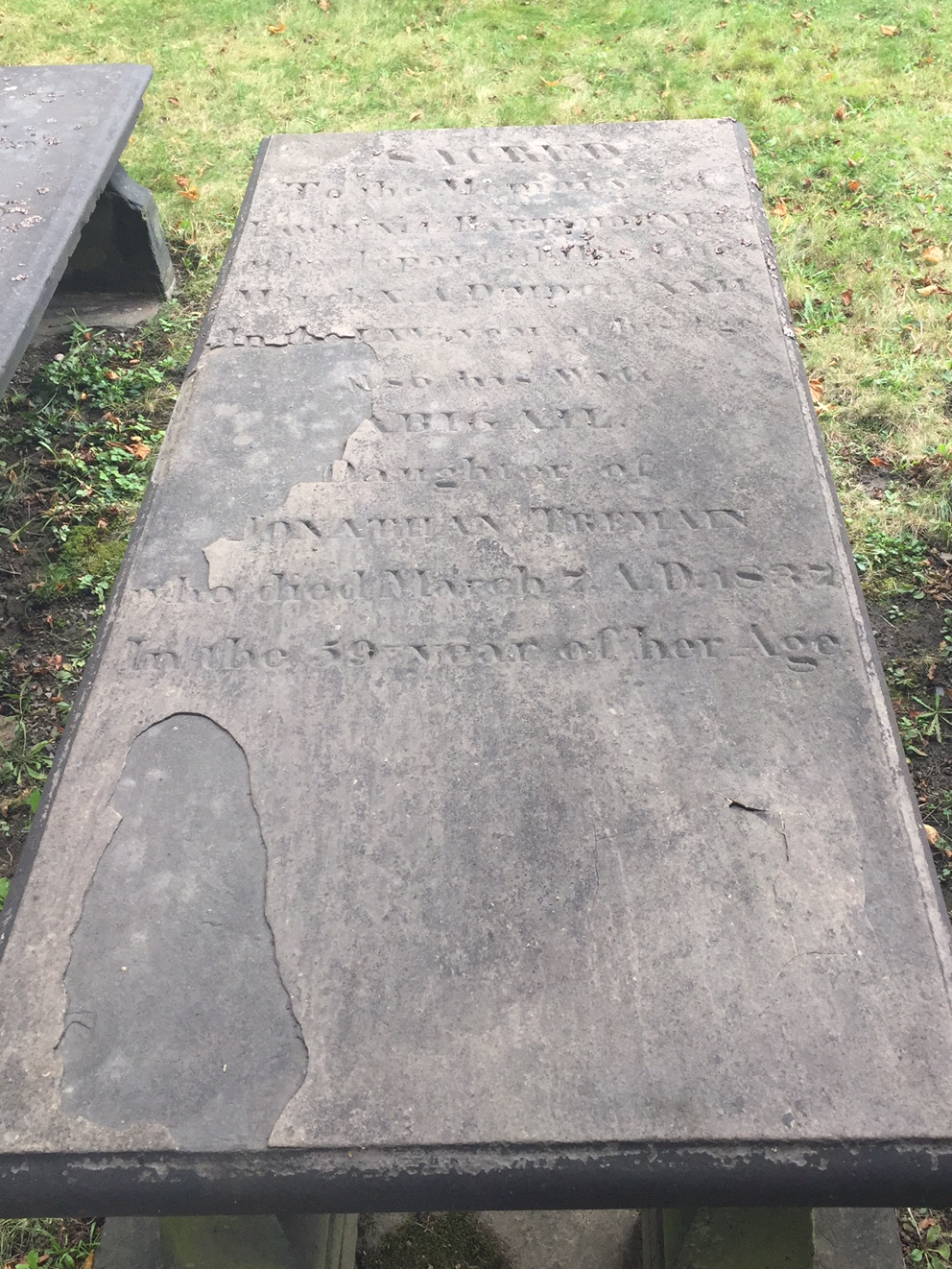
The gravestone of Lawrence Hartshorne, a Quaker who was the chief assistant of John Clarkson.

The Nova Scotian Settlers, or Sierra Leone Settlers (also known as the Nova Scotians or more commonly as the Settlers), were African Americans and Black Canadians of Black American descent who founded the settlement of Freetown, Sierra Leone and the Colony of Sierra Leone, on March 11, 1792. The majority of these British loyalist immigrants were among 3,000 people, mostly former slaves, who had sought freedom and refuge with the British during the American Revolutionary War, leaving rebel masters. They became known as the Black Loyalists. The Nova Scotian Settlers were jointly led by Thomas Peters, a former soldier, and English abolitionist John Clarkson. For most of the 19th century, the Settlers resided in Settler Town and remained a distinct ethnic group within the Freetown territory, tending to marry among themselves and with Europeans in the colony.

The Settler descendants gradually developed as an ethnicity known as the Sierra Leone Creole people. Loan words in the Krio language and the "bod oses" of their modern-day descendants are some of their cultural imprints. Although the Jamaican Maroons and other transatlantic immigrants contributed toward the development of Freetown, the 1200 Nova Scotian Settlers were the single greatest Western black influence. The Nova Scotian Settlers have been the subject of many social science books, which have examined how they brought "America" to Africa, because they naturally carried their culture with them. They founded the first permanent ex-slave colony in West Africa, and it was influential throughout the region.

== Background and immigration to Nova Scotia ==
During the American Revolutionary War, the British offered freedom to slaves who left rebel masters and joined their forces. Thousands of slaves escaped during the war, disrupting some of the slave societies in the South, and many joined the British lines. After the British lost the American War of Independence, it kept its promise to the former slaves. Some freedmen were evacuated to the Caribbean or London.

But its forces also evacuated 3,000 former slaves to Nova Scotia for resettlement, and their names were recorded in the Book of Negroes. Nearly two-thirds of the Nova Scotian Settlers were from Virginia. The second largest group of black settlers were from South Carolina, and a smaller number from Maryland, Georgia, and North Carolina. Thomas Jefferson referred to these people as "the fugitives from these States". The US appealed to have the slaves returned, but the British refused. As part of its compensation to Loyalists, the Crown also settled white Loyalists in Nova Scotia, and the western frontier of Upper Canada (Ontario). It made land grants to households and offered supplies to help them get settled.

== Life in Nova Scotia ==
Upon arrival in Nova Scotia, the Black Loyalist settlers faced many difficulties because of discrimination. They received less land, fewer provisions, and were paid lower wages than White Loyalists. Some fell into debt and had to sign terms of indentured servitude, which resembled their former enslavement in the colonies. They found the cold climate forbidding after living in more temperate areas.

In the late eighteenth century, the black Nova Scotians were offered a choice to emigrate to a new colony being established by Great Britain in West Africa, intended for the resettlement of blacks from London (who were also mostly African Americans resettled after the Revolution), and some free blacks from the Caribbean. In 1792, approximately 1,192 Black Nova Scotian Settlers left Halifax, Nova Scotia and immigrated to Sierra Leone. The majority of free blacks did remain in Nova Scotia and made communities. Their descendants today comprise the Black Nova Scotians, one of the oldest communities of Black Canadians.

The Nova Scotian Settlers to Sierra Leone tended to speak early forms of African-American Vernacular English; some from the Low Country of South Carolina spoke Gullah, a kind of creole more closely related to African languages. The Nova Scotians were the only mass group of former slaves to immigrate to Sierra Leone under the auspices of the Sierra Leone Company. After its officials learned what democratic and 'American' ideals the Nova Scotians held and practised, the Company did not allow other former slaves to immigrate in large groups to the new colony.

Fifteen ships, the first fleet to bring Free blacks to Africa, left Halifax Harbour on January 15, 1792, and arrived in Sierra Leone between February 28 and March 9, 1792. About 65 passengers died en route.

One visitor to Sierra Leone distinguished the Settlers from other ethnic groups because of the "American tone" or accent, common to American slaves and perhaps lower-class American working-class people of the time. As was common for North Americans of African descent, many had some Native American or European ancestry. Only fifty of the group had been born in Africa and more recently enslaved.

After settling in Sierra Leone, many Nova Scotian blacks intermarried with Europeans as the colony developed. The Nova Scotians' political ideology of a democratic, representative government was at odds with the Sierra Leone Company's managing an imperialistic colony. The Nova Scotians referred to themselves as the "Settlers" or "Nova Scotians" in Sierra Leone. Later scholars would describe them as "Afro-American", in reference to their ethnicity and particular historical origin in that culture of the Thirteen Colonies.

== Settler Town ==
In 1792, the Nova Scotians founded and established Free Town in Sierra Leone. They based its plan on what they were familiar with: the grid of a North American colonial town plan. When they learned the Sierra Leone Company had reserved the best waterfront land for its own use, tensions arose. Soon the British deported some Maroons from Jamaica and resettled them in this colony. They mixed with the Novia Scotians, and this Settler part of Freetown became known as Settler Town.

The town was in close proximity to Cline Town (then Granville Town). Eighty percent of Nova Scotians lived on five streets: Rawdon, Wilberforce, Howe, East, and Charlotte street. Seventy percent of Maroons lived on five streets: Glouchester, George, Trelawney, Walpole, and Westmoreland street. The main Nova Scotian churches were in Settler Town; Rawdon Street Methodist Church was one of the main churches. The modern day Ebenezer Methodist Church is an offshoot of Rawdon Methodist; it was founded by wealthy Nova Scotians. Many Settler families were forced to sell their land because of debt; families such as the Balls, the Burdens, the Chambers, the Dixons, the Georges (descendants of David George), the Keelings, the Leighs, the Moores, the Peters (descendants of Thomas Peters or Stephen Peters), the Prestons, the Snowballs, the Staffords, the Turners, the Willoughsby, the Williams, and the Goodings. Some descendants of James Wise and other settlers were able to keep their land in Settler Town.

== Relationship with Granville Town settlers ==
The Granville Town settlers were initially separate from the Nova Scotian community. After Methodist teaching to the Granville Town settlers, they were slowly incorporated into the society of the Nova Scotians. Nova Scotians like Boston King were schoolteachers to the children of Granville Town settlers. However, up until 1800, the "Old Settlers" (as the Granville Towners were called) remained in their own town.

== French attack ==
During the War of the First Coalition (1792–1797) the French attacked and burned Freetown in September 1794. For over two weeks the settlement was subject to the depredations of the French Army over whom the French Commodore had little control. The Settlers offered the only resistance to the French during this time period. The Settlers assured the French that they were “Britons from North America” and were friends of the French. Despite showing they were Britons, the French still carried off two Nova Scotian boys as slaves. Zachary Macauley demanded all the supplies the Nova Scotians had managed to take from the French back. Many a Methodist preacher declared it was the judgment of God against their evil Caucasian oppressors. The aftermath of this was that Nathaniel Snowball and Luke Jordan established their own colony on Pirate's Bay to live as free men just as the Ezerlites.

== Trade ==
The Nova Scotians were exceptional traders and some of the houses they built in Settler Town, which were initially built of wood with stone foundations, were renovated or upgraded into stone houses. At this time, the Nova Scotians lived in Eastern Freetown and the Jamaican Maroons were situated in Western Freetown. The Maroons were still distinct but became a more solid group and adopted some Settler values and customs. The Maroons became a cohesive trading unit, they displaced the Nova Scotians as the main traders in Sierra Leone in the 1820s. Nova Scotian traders such as Cato Preston, Eli Ackim, William Easmon, and John Kizell were forced to give up their homes because of business ventures gone wrong. In the 1826 census, about half of the Nova Scotian males were skilled artisans and only three were listed as unskilled workers. Initially, the Nova Scotians were allowed to use the American currency, dollars and cents, by the Sierra Leone Company; however, restrictions were later imposed when the company wanted reduced American economic influence. Trade was opened up with the United States in 1831 but grew only slowly, mainly through smuggling.

== Culture ==
The Settlers had dance nights called 'Koonking' or 'Koonken' or 'Konken,' where Settler maidens would sing songs they brought from Colonial America or songs originating in Sierra Leone satirizing Europeans. An analysis of extant letters written by the Settlers has shown a majority of Settlers spoke a variant of English, typical of American English as spoken by people drawn from the lower classes, regardless of whether White or Black. James Walker noted that Settler pronunciation and grammar originated in the American South and was "perpetuated as the language of their preachers and teachers, and was regarded, in the nineteenth century, as a distinct dialect." Many Nova Scotians drank alcohol heavily and David George and David Edmonds kept alehouses in the 1790s. Settler women were independent and were employed as schoolteachers and in other roles. Some established schools and acted as schoolteachers. Extramarital affairs were also prominent in the community and some Settler men had mistresses and provided for their illegitimate children; many times they left land and property for them in their wills.

The majority of Nova Scotians were Methodist or members of the Countess of Huntingdon's Connexion; a smaller minority were Baptist. One half to two thirds of the Nova Scotians were Methodist; the former Anglican settlers converted to Methodism and the Methodists incorporated Moses Wilkinson's congregation, Boston King's congregation, and Joseph Leonard's Anglican congregation which was openly Methodist.

== British policy toward Nova Scotian Settlers ==
Because of friction between the independent Nova Scotia settlers and British authorities, no further resettlement of Nova Scotians followed. When the Elizabeth, a hired armed tender serving under the Royal Navy from 22 January 1808 to 27 April 1809, arrived from New York with 82 African Americans, the British did not permit them to land or settle in Freetown. These Nova Scotians, led by Daniel Coker, were offered land to settle in Sherbro by John Kizell, an African-born Nova Scotian Settler. Unhappy with terrible conditions of the settlers at Sherbro, they moved to land in the Grain Coast; the African Americans who moved thither in 1820 were the first settlers of what would become Liberia. In the War of 1812, the British considered Sierra Leone as a home for the Black Refugees, another group of Africans who escaped American slavery, but instead chose to settle them in Nova Scotia and the West Indies. The Nova Scotians in the 1830s and 40s would be faced with the large-scale settlement of Africans freed from slave ships by the Royal Navy's anti-slave trade campaign.

=== Relationship between Black Nova Scotians and Black Americans ===
Some of the settlers bore children during their nine-year sojourn in Nova Scotia; these children were Black Nova Scotians but retained many cultural habits similar to African Americans in North America and Britain. The descendants of the Nova Scotian settlers (who are the Sierra Leone Creole people) are related to both Black Nova Scotians and Black Americans.

== Notable Nova Scotian Settlers and their Creole descendants ==
=== Notable Nova Scotian Settlers ===
- Thomas Peters (1738–1792), Black leader in Sierra Leone
- David George ( –1810), Black American Baptist preacher
- Boston King (1760–1802), Black American Methodist preacher
- Harry Washington (c. 1740–1800), slave of U.S. President George Washington

=== Notable Creole descendants of the Settlers ===
- Easmon family, prominent Creole medical dynasty
- Noah Arthur Cox-George (1915–2004), economist and university professor
- Arthur Thomas Porter (1924–2019), university professor and administrator
- George William Nicol (1810–1884), first African Colonial Secretary of Sierra Leone
- Edward Mayfield Boyle (1878–1936), medical doctor
- Edna Elliott-Horton (1904–1994), political activist
- Henry O. Macauley (1962–2023), politician and diplomat
- James C.E. Parkes (1861−1899), first colonial Secretary for Native Affairs in Sierra Leone
- George T.O. Robinson (1922–2006), founder of the Krio Descendants Union, which was an offshoot of the Settlers Descendants Union
- Sir Henry Lightfoot Boston (1898–1969), first African Governor-General of Sierra Leone
- Samuel Coleridge-Taylor (1875–1912), known for his three cantatas on the epic 1855 poem The Song of Hiawatha
- Lati Hyde-Forster (1911–2001), first female graduate of the oldest western-style university in Africa
- Clifford Nelson Fyle (1933–2006), university professor and author of the Sierra Leone National Anthem
- Charles D. B. King (1875–1961), former president of Liberia
- John Henry Clavell Smythe (1915–1996), pilot in the Royal Air Force during World War II

== See also ==
- Committee for the Relief of the Black Poor
- African-American diaspora
- African Americans
- Black Loyalists
- Atlantic slave trade
- History of Sierra Leone
- Philipsburg Proclamation
- Slavery in the United States
