= Krio language =

English-based creole spoken in Sierra Leone

Sierra Leonean Creole
- Native to: Sierra Leone
- Region: West Africa
- Ethnicity: Sierra Leone Creoles; Gambian Creoles; Krio Fernandinos; Nigerian Creoles
- Speakers: L1: 860,000 (2021); L2: 6.9 million (2021)
- Language family: English-African Creole: Guinea Coast Creole English; West African Pidgin English; Krio; Sierra Leonean Creole
- Dialects: Fernandino Creole English; Gambian Krio

Official status
- Official language in: Sierra Leone

Language codes
- ISO 639-3: kri
- Glottolog: krio1253
- Linguasphere: 52-ABB-bb

Video of an L2 speaker of the Krio language

The Sierra Leonean Creole or Krio is an English-based creole language that is the lingua franca spoken throughout the West African nation of Sierra Leone and, like other varieties of West African Pidgin English originated as a language of contact between colonizing British and African slave traders for the transatlantic slave trade. Krio is spoken by 96 percent of the country's population, and it unites the different ethnic groups in the country, especially in their trade and social interaction with each other. Krio is the primary language of communication among Sierra Leoneans at home and abroad, and has also heavily influenced Sierra Leonean English. The language is native to the Sierra Leone Creole people, or Krios, a community of about 104,311 descendants of freed slaves from the West Indies, United States and the British Empire, and is spoken as a second language by millions of other Sierra Leoneans belonging to the country's indigenous tribes. English is Sierra Leone's official language, and Krio, despite its common use throughout the country, has no official status.

== Overview ==
The Krio language is an offshoot of the languages and variations of English brought by the Nova Scotian Settlers from North America, Maroons from Jamaica, and the numerous liberated African slaves who settled in Sierra Leone.

All freed slaves—the Jamaican Maroons, African Americans, and Liberated Africans—influenced Krio, but the Jamaican Maroons, Igbo, Yoruba and Akan Liberated Africans were the most influential. It seems probable that the basic grammatical structure and vowel system of Krio is an offshoot of Jamaican Maroon Creole spoken by the Maroons, as there are well-documented and important direct historical connections between Jamaica and Sierra Leone. The language was also influenced by African American Vernacular English while the majority of the African words in Krio come from Akan, Yoruba and Igbo.

As an English-based creole language, the Sierra Leone Krio is distinct from a pidgin as it is a language in its own right, with fixed grammatical structures and rules. Krio also draws from other European languages, like Portuguese and French, e.g. the Krio word gentri/gentree, which means wealth or to acquire wealth, is derived from the Old French word 'gentry', and the Krio word pikin, which means 'child', indirectly comes from the Portuguese word pequeno meaning 'small' and often used to mean children in Portuguese.

In Sierra Leone, the Krio Language is spoken by people with different degrees of fluency, as well as regional changes to the Krio. Many of the speakers of Sierra Leone Krio live in or close to the capital city, Freetown. As of 2007, there were close to 350,000 individuals who spoke Krio as a primary language. Even more individuals were using it as a main language for communication purposes in the country as a whole.

== Language origins ==
The early roots of Krio go back to the Atlantic slave trade era in the 17th and 18th centuries when an English-based "pidgin" language (West African Pidgin English, also called Guinea Coast Creole English) arose to facilitate the coastal trade between colonizing Europeans and Africans. This early pidgin later became the lingua franca of regional trade among West Africans themselves and likely spread up the river systems to the African interior. After the founding of Freetown, this preexisting pidgin was incorporated into the speech of the various groups of freed slaves landed in Sierra Leone between 1787 and about 1855. The pidgin gradually evolved to become a stable language, the native language of descendants of the freed slaves (which are now a distinct ethnic and cultural group, the Creoles), and the lingua franca of Sierra Leone.

== Language usage ==
=== Krio usage in Sierra Leone ===
Most ethnic and cultural Creoles live in and around Freetown, the capital of Sierra Leone, and their community accounts for about 15% of Sierra Leone's total population (Freetown is the province where the returned slaves from London and Nova Scotia settled). However, because of their cultural influence in Sierra Leone, especially during the period of colonial rule, their language is used as the lingua franca among all the ethnic groups in Sierra Leone.

=== Krio speakers abroad ===
The Sierra Leone Creole people acted as traders and missionaries in other parts of West Africa during the 19th century, and as a result, there are also Krio-speaking communities in The Gambia, Nigeria, Cameroon, Equatorial Guinea, Senegal, and Guinea. As a result of Sierra Leone Creole migratory patterns, in the Gambia, the Gambian Creoles or Aku community speak Krio. The Fernando Po Creole English language of Equatorial Guinea is also largely a result of Sierra Leone Creole migrants. A small number of liberated Africans returned to the land of their origins, such as the Saros of Nigeria who not only took their Western names with them but also imported Krio words like sabi into Nigerian Pidgin English.

=== Language revival ===
During the period of colonial rule, Sierra Leoneans (particularly among the upper class) were discouraged from speaking Krio; but after independence from the United Kingdom in 1961, writers and educators began promoting its use. In the 1960s, Thomas Decker translated some of Shakespeare's plays into Krio, and composed original poetry in the language. In the 1980s, the New Testament was translated into Krio. Beginning with the involvement of Lutheran Bible Translators, Krio-language translations of the New Testament and Old Testament were published in 1986 and 2013.

While English is Sierra Leone's official language, the Ministry of Education began using Krio as the medium of instruction in some primary schools in Freetown in the 1990s. Radio stations now broadcast a wide variety of programs in Krio. Sierra Leonean politicians also routinely give public speeches in the language.

== Classification ==
Krio is an English-based creole from which descend Nigerian Pidgin English and Cameroonian Pidgin English and Pichinglis. It is also similar to English-based creole languages spoken in the Americas, especially Jamaican Patois (Jamaican Creole), Sranan Tongo (Surinamese Creole), Bajan Creole and Gullah language, but it has its own distinctive character. It also shares some linguistic similarities with non-English creoles, such as the French-based creoles of the Caribbean.

== Phonology ==
Krio contains seven monophthongs in its inventory of vowels, all of which can be nasalized. Most nasal vowels occur in words derived from English, in cases where an oral vowel precedes a nasal consonant. The nasal consonant is deleted and the vowel is nasalized.

=== Vowels ===
	Front	Central	Back
Close	i		u
Close-mid	e		o
Open-mid	ɛ		ɔ
Open		a	

Krio has three diphthongs: /ai/, /au/, and /ɔi/.

=== Consonants ===
There are 24 phonemes in the consonant inventory of Krio.

		Bilabial	Labiodental	Labial–velar	Alveolar	Palatal	Velar	Uvular
Plosive	voiceless	p		kp	t		k	
Plosive	voiced	b		ɡb	d		ɡ	
Fricative	voiceless		f		s	ʃ		
Fricative	voiced		v		z	ʒ		ʁ ⟨r⟩
Affricate	voiceless					tʃ		
Affricate	voiced					dʒ		
Median				w		j ⟨y⟩		
Lateral					l			
Nasal		m			n	ɲ	ŋ	

Consonant cluster reduction is a common process in phonology. It is typically applied to lexical items in English containing two or more consonants in a row including an initial s. Some examples include:

Krio word	English meaning
plit	'split'
trit	'street'
tret	'straight'
pit	'spit'
prɛd	'spread'
tap	'stop'

Replacing a fricative with a stop, known as stopping substitution, is also common in words of English origin. Some examples include:

Krio word	English meaning
dɛm	'them'
brɔda	'brother'
tɛŋki	'thanks'
ebi	'heavy'
dɛbul	'devil'
tit	'teeth'

There is also evidence of the influence of West African languages in the presence of the labial-velar plosives /kp/ and /gb/, as in:

Krio word	English meaning
akpɔlɔ	'frog'
agbo	'medicinal herb'
gbagbati	'show of force'
kpatakpata	'completely finished'

Krio is a tonal language and makes contrastive use of tone in both African and English words. Examples of minimal pairs of words distinguished by tone patterns are:

LL (low-low)	LH (low-high)	HL (high-low)	HH (high-high)
ale 'skin-irritating herb'	ale 'go away'		
	baba 'a young boy'	baba 'a barber'	baba 'a type of drum'
	bebi 'a baby or a doll'	bebi 'girlfriend or attractive young woman'	
	brɔda 'elder brother or older male relative'	brɔda 'brother'	
	fada 'a Catholic priest'	fada 'father'	fada ‘God’
	kɔntri 'someone from the countryside'	kɔntri 'a country'	

== Orthography ==
Krio uses the Latin script but without Qq and Xx and with three additional letters from the African reference alphabet, Ɛɛ (open E), Ŋŋ (eng), and Ɔɔ (open O). Three tones can be distinguished in Krio and are sometimes marked with grave (à), acute (á), and circumflex (â) accents over the vowels for low, high, and falling tones respectively but these accents are not employed in normal usage.

The complete alphabet with digraphs:

Krio alphabet
Krio letter or digraph	Example word	English meaning
A, a	wata	water
Aw, aw	naw	now
Ay, ay	yay	eye
B, b	bin	already
Ch, ch	cham	chew
D, d	dia	expensive (< dear)
E, e	let	late
Ɛ, ɛ	ɛp	help
F, f	fɔs	first
G, g	got	goat
H, h	Harry	Harry
I, i	titi	little girl, small female child
J, j	jomp	jump
K, k	kɔntri	country
L, l	liv	live (being alive)
M, m	muf/muv	to move
N, n	nak	knock
Ny, ny	nyu	new
Ŋ, ŋ	siŋ	sing
O, o	wok	to work
Ɔ, ɔ	bɔn	born, give birth to
Ɔy, ɔy	jɔy	joy, happiness
P, p	padi	friend
R, r	ren	rain
S, s	saf	soft
Sh, sh	shem	shame, to be ashamed
T, t	tif	steal (< thief)
T, t	tranga	difficult, hard
U, u	uman	woman
V, v	vot	vote
W, w	waka	walk
Y, y	yala	yellow
Z, z	zɛd	the letter 'z'
Zh, zh	plɛzhɔ	pleasure

== Grammar ==
The particle dɛm is appended after a noun to mark the plural, e.g. uman ('woman'):

singular	plural
uman	uman dɛm

=== Verbs ===
Verbs do not conjugate according to person or number, but reflect their tense. Tense, aspect and mood are marked by one or more tense or aspect markers. The tense markers are 'bin' for the past tense and 'go' for the future, the absence of either shows the present tense. Aspect is shown by dɔn (from English 'done') for perfective and de (cf. English 'there', Yoruba dé, dà) for imperfective. Infinitive is marked by fɔ (from English 'for') and conditional by a combination of bin and go. Tendency is marked by kin and nɔba/naba.

The verbal paradigm is as follows:

Krio form	Verb tense
fɔ go	infinitive
go	present simple (unmarked)
de go	present progressive
dɔn go	perfect
dɔn de go	perfect progressive
go go	future simple
go de go	future progressive
go dɔn go	future perfect
go dɔn de go	future perfect progressive
bin go	past simple
bin de go	past progressive
bin dɔn go	past perfect
bin dɔn de go	past perfect progressive
bin fɔ go	conditional
bin fɔ de go	conditional progressive
bin fɔ dɔn go	conditional perfect
bin fɔ dɔn de go	conditional perfect progressive
kin go	tendency
nɔ kin go, nɔba go	negative tendency

The hortative is marked by lɛ (from English 'let'), e.g. lɛ wi go ('let's go'), lɛ wi tɔk ('let's talk') and the optative by mek (from English 'make'), e.g. mek yu kiŋdɔm kam ('let your kingdom come'), mek wetin yu want ('let your will be done').

=== Interrogatives ===
The following interrogatives can be used:

Krio word	English meaning
udat	who
wetin	what
ustɛm	when
usai	where
wetin-mek	why
us	which
ɔmɔs	how much/many

In addition, like many other creoles, a question can be asked simply by intonation. E.g. yu de go? ('are you going?') vs. yu de go. ('you are going'). Additionally the question particles ɛnti and nɔ so/noto so can be used at the start or end of the phrase respectively.

=== Pronouns ===
There is no distinction between masculine and feminine in any person and, unlike Standard English, there is a second person plural form. However, there are the hints of nominative, accusative and genitive cases.

Krio word	English meaning
a, mi, mi	I, me, my
yu	you, your
i, in, am, im	he/she/it, him/her/it, his/her/its
wi	we, us, our
unu, una, ina	you, you, your (plural)
dɛm, dɛn	they, them, theirs

== Vocabulary ==
Below are some common words in Krio, showing words from various origins:

Krio word	English meaning
Salon/Salone	Sierra Leone
Adu, Kushɛ	Hello, Hi
Padi	Friend
Titi	Girl
Bɔbɔ	Boy
Mi	Me
Pikin	Child
Wɔwɔ	Ugly
Yu	You
Plaba	Conflict
Sɔri, Ɔsh	Sorry
Tɔk	Talk
Fɔgɛt	Forget
Ansa	Answer
Mek	Make
Bɔku	Many, Too much
Uman	Woman
Lef	Stop
Mɔt	Mouth
Kil	Kill
Pipul	People
Wetin	What
Usay/Usai, We	Where
Wetin-mek	Why
Ustɛm	When
Vɛx	Angry
Dia	Expensive
Waka	Walk
Cham	Chew
Motoka	Car
Sabi	Know
Fεt	Fight
Wεf	Wife
Lεf	Stop
Mama	Mother
Papa	Father
Grani	Grandmother
Granpa	Grandfather
Tif	Steal
Jomp	Jump
Chɛr	Rip
Dede/Dai	Dead
Tata	Bye

Below are some sample sentences in Krio:

Krio sentence	English meaning
Kushɛ/Kushɛ-o	"Hello", "Hi"
Wetin na yu nem?	"What is your name?"
Mi nem na Jems.	"My name is James."
Usai yu kɔmɔt?	"Where do you come from?"
A kɔmɔt Estins.	"I come from Hastings."
Us wok yu de du?	"What work do you do?"
Mi na ticha.	"I am a teacher."
Na us skul yu de tich?	"At what school do you teach?"
A de tich na Prins ɔf Wels.	"I teach at Prince of Wales."
A gladi fɔ mit yu.	"I am happy to meet you."
Misɛf gladi fɔ mit yu.	"I myself am happy to meet you."
OK, a de go naw.	"OK, I am going now."
Ɔrayt, wi go tok bak.	"Alright, we will talk again."

Below is a sample of the Universal Declaration of Human Rights in Krio:

Krio	High Krio (Salontòk)	English
Atikul Wan	Artikul Wan	Article 1
Ɛvribɔdi bɔn fri ɛn gɛt in yon rayt, nobɔdi nɔ pas in kɔmpin. Wi ɔl ebul fɔ tink ɛn fɛnɔt wetin rayt ɛn rɔŋ. Ɛn pantap dat wi fɔ sabi aw fɔ liv lɛk wan big famili.	Òll mòrtalmandèm bòrn fri èn ekwal pan dignity èn raihtdèm. Dhèm gèt ratio èn kònshèns èn pantap dhat dhèm fòr akt with dhèm kòmpin na bròdharhudim spirit.	All human beings are born free and equal in dignity and rights. They are endowed with reason and conscience and should act towards one another in a spirit of brotherhood.

== Films ==
Krio is used (incorrectly) early in the 2006 film Blood Diamond between Danny Archer (played by Leonardo DiCaprio) and a character named Commander Zero.

It can be heard in the music video for "Diamonds from Sierra Leone", a song by American rapper Kanye West.

In 2007, work was completed on an unsanctioned, dubbed Krio version of Franco Zeffirelli's 1977 film Jesus of Nazareth. The dubs were recorded by a team of over 14 native Krio speakers, over a period of 9 months in the Lungi region of Sierra Leone. The film aired on ABC-TV and a limited run of 300 copies were produced, which were mostly sold in Lungi and Freetown.

Krio is heard in the English language documentary War Don Don. The film's title is in Krio.

The first feature-length documentary entirely spoken in Krio is Boris Gerrets' film Shado’man (2014). It was shot in Freetown at night with a group of homeless disabled people. The film premiered at the IDFA documentary festival in Amsterdam and was seen in festivals around the world including FESPACO, the biannual Pan-African film festival in Ouagadougou.

== Fiction ==
Peter Grant, the protagonist of Ben Aaronovitch's Rivers of London series, is the London-born son of an immigrant from Sierra Leone. While speaking English with other characters, he speaks Krio with his mother. Aaronovitch includes some such conversations in his text, leaving the reader to puzzle out what was said.

== See also ==
- Sierra Leonean English
- Ian Hancock
