= Henry O. Macauley =

Sierra Leonean politician (1962–2023)

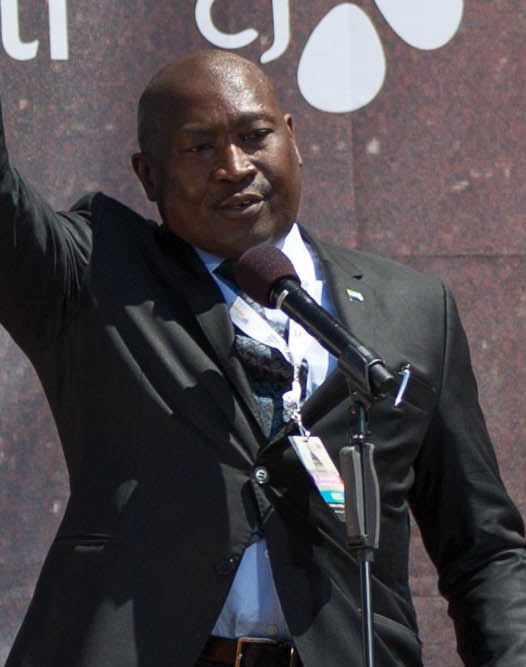
Macauley in 2015

Henry O. Macauley (14 January 1962 – 18 March 2023) was the Minister of Energy for the Government of Sierra Leone. Macauley previously served as the Sierra Leone High Commissioner to Nigeria, Cameroon, and Equatorial Guinea.

== Early life and education ==
Henry O. Macauley was born on 14 January 1962 in Freetown, Sierra Leone. He was educated at the Prince of Wales Secondary School and subsequently earned a bachelor's degree with Honours in Engineering at Fourah Bay College. He also held an MBA degree from Knightsbridge University, in addition to a certificate in oil industry from the Oxford Princeton Programme.

== Career ==
Henry Macauley was a businessman with expertise in oil industries in Sierra Leone and Nigeria. He worked in France and the United States for Partenaire Service a L’ Industerie and Intraco Consultants Company before returning to Sierra Leonea and forming PANAF Group Limited, which imported crude oil into Sierra Leone. He also established Unipetrol Limited in Sierra Leone, Petrotex in the Gambia, and founded the Royal Marine and Spares Limited, an oil servicing company.

Henry Macauley served as President of the Sierra Leone Business Association.

== Ministerial Service ==
In 2008, he was appointed to serve as Sierra Leone's High Commissioner to Nigeria. After serving with distinction in this role, he was appointed Minister of Energy in 2014.
