= Settler Town, Sierra Leone =

Oldest neighborhood of Freetown, Sierra Leone

Settler Town (Settler Tong in Krio) is the oldest part of the city of Freetown, now the capital of Sierra Leone, and was the first home of the Nova Scotian Settlers.

== History ==
The Nova Scotian Settlers were African Americans, many of them ex-slaves, who had escaped to British lines during the American Revolutionary War. After the British defeat, they had first emigrated to Halifax, but did not find a warm reception or climate. As a result, on January 15, 1792, Lieutenant John Clarkson led 1,196 of them from Halifax Harbor in fifteen ships across the Atlantic to what is now Sierra Leone on behalf of the Sierra Leone Company. They arrived on March 11 and founded the settlement of Freetown. These newcomers came to be known as the "Nova Scotians" and the "Settlers".

During the French Revolutionary Wars, on the night of 27 September or on 28 September, 1794, a French squadron arrived and plundered and destroyed Freetown. The Company's ship Harpy, which had just arrived from England with a cargo valued at £10,000, and two smaller vessels were captured, and the slave factories were put out of commission for a while. The Sierra Leone Company suffered losses estimated at £55,000, £15,000 of that from the destruction of buildings.

Following the arrival of the Jamaican Maroons in 1800, this second set of colonists established Maroon Town to the west of Settler Town. Settler Town was located between Little East Street (now Malamah-Thomas Street) and George Street, the latter being the traditional boundary with Maroon Town.

During the nineteenth century, Settler Town was a prestigious residential area.

== Notable people ==
Notable residents include three American ex-slaves and Black Loyalists:

- Thomas Peters (1738–1792), considered one of the founding fathers of Sierra Leone
- David George (c. 1743–1810), a preacher and founder of the first Baptist church
- Moses Wilkinson (born c. 1756/47), a blind and lame preacher who established the first Methodist church in Settler Town

== See also ==
- Rawdon Street Methodist Church
