= Smith family (Sierra Leone) =

Genealogy

The Smith family is a Sierra Leone Creole family of English, Jamaican Maroon and Liberated African descent based in Freetown, Sierra Leone. The Smiths were first-generation Sierra Leone Creoles of Gold Coast Euro-African and Caribbean origin who settled in Sierra Leone during the early 19th century. There are several descendants of the family in the United Kingdom and the United States, as well as in the Ghanaian cities of Accra and Cape Coast. Several members of the family were active in business, women's education, civil administration, the arts, medicine, poetry, the judiciary, cultural studies, Pan-Africanism and anti-colonial activism.

== Prominent members ==
- William Smith Jr. (1816–1895) was a Gold Coast-Sierra Leonean civil servant who worked in Freetown, Sierra Leone, as a registrar for the Mixed Commissionary Court. Due to his position and through his marriage to wealthy Freetown Creoles, Smith Jr., became a prominent figure in Sierra Leone, where he had 14 children. He was born in Cape Coast in 1816 to a Fanti mother and William Smith Sr (1795–1875) from Yorkshire, England. William Smith Jr., was married to Charlotte Macaulay, the daughter of Mary Harding, a Jamaican Maroon, and Kenneth Macaulay, a distant relation of Lord Macaulay and second cousin to Zachary Macaulay.
- Robert Smith (1840–1885), was born in Freetown, Sierra Leone, to William Smith Jr., and Charlotte Smith (née Macaulay). He attended school in Yorkshire, England before entering the Royal College of Physicians and Surgeons of Glasgow, completing his studies and becoming registered in 1866. He became the first West African to become a Fellow of the Royal College of Surgeons in 1871. Robert Smith returned to Sierra Leone and was eventually appointed Assistant Colonial Surgeon. In 1881 he became a non-resident fellow of the Royal Colonial Institute. In 1865, Smith married Annie Mary Pine, the daughter of Governor Benjamin Chilley Campbell Pine. The couple lived at Smith's family house at Charlotte Street and had at least three children, Chilley Smith, Charlotte A. Smith, and Florence Mary Smith (1869–1883).
- Francis Smith (1847–1912), was born in Freetown to William Smith Jr., and Charlotte Smith (née Macaulay). He was educated at Queen Elizabeth Grammar School, Wakefield in Yorkshire. After completing his secondary education, he entered Middle Temple in 1868 and was called to the bar in 1871. Francis Smith was appointed Chief Magistrate of The Gambia in 1879 and as a Puisne Judge of the Supreme Court of the Gold Coast Colony in 1887. He was later considered for appointment as Chief Justice. Francis Smith was the younger brother of Robert Smith and the maternal grandfather of Frances Wright through her mother, Eva Wright (née Smith), and his great-grandson and namesake is Emile Francis Short, the first justice on the Commission on Human Rights and Administrative Justice.
- Anne Spilsbury (1840–1876), a granddaughter of English physician Dr George Green Spilsbury, became the second wife of William Smith Jr., after their marriage in 1858 at St. George's Cathedral. She was half-sister to Thomas Hamilton Spilsbury, the first African to be appointed Head of a Medical Department in British West Africa. Their father was Joseph Green Spilsbury and Thomas also married one of Smith Jr's daughters, Philippa. Anne's mother was Hannah Carew Spilsbury. The Spilsbury family were wealthy merchants and Anne was of English, Jamaican Maroon, and Sierra Leone heritage.
- Adelaide Casely-Hayford (née Smith) (1868–1960), was born in 1868 Freetown, to William Smith Jr., and a Creole mother, Anne Spilsbury. Casely-Hayford was an advocate, activist of cultural nationalism, a teacher, fiction writer and feminist. As a pioneer of women's education in Sierra Leone, she played a key role in popularizing Pan-Africanist and feminist politics in the early 1900s. While in England, Adelaide Smith married J. E. Casely Hayford. Their daughter Gladys Casely-Hayford became a well-known Creole poet.

== Other descendants ==
Charlotte Macaulay and William Smith Jr., had seven children, William Henry, Robert, Philippa, Mary, John Frederick, Francis, and Charlotte (who died at the age of 36). Mary Smith was married to William Broughton Davies (1831–1906), a Creole physician of Yoruba Liberated African stock.

The children of William Smith Jr., by his second wife included Joseph Spilsbury, Thomas, Emma, Casely, Elizabeth, Hannah, Adelaide, and Annette. Adelaide married and was later known as Adelaide Casely-Hayford. Elizabeth and Hannah married noted brothers William and Peter of the prominent Awoonor-Renner family. Annette married prominent doctor John Farrell Easmon of Nova Scotian Settler stock and their son, M.C.F. Easmon was a prominent medical doctor and historian. After Anne's death in 1875, Smith married a third time.
