= Easmon =

Easmon is a patronymic surname of English origin and is a variation of the surname Eastman. The surname is typically ascribed to a notable medical dynasty of Sierra Leone Creole descent. Notable people with the surname include:

- Albert Whiggs Easmon (1865–1923), Sierra Leonean doctor, half-brother of Dr John Farrell Easmon
- Charles Odamtten Easmon, F.R.C.S. (1913–1994), first Ghanaian surgeon and pioneer of cardiac surgery in West Africa
- Charles Syrett Farrell Easmon, CBE, MD, PhD, MRCP, FRCPath, FMedSci, (born 1946), British microbiologist and medical professor
- John Farrell Easmon, M.R.C.S. L.M., L.K.Q.C.P., M.D., CMO, (1856–1900), prominent Sierra Leonean Creole doctor, Chief Medical Officer of the Gold Coast during the 1890
- Kathleen Mary Easmon Simango (died 1924), Sierra Leonean missionary and artist who was the first West African to earn a diploma from the Royal College of Arts
- McCormack Easmon, OBE (1890–1972), physician from Accra, son of John Farrell Easmon
- Raymond Sarif Easmon (1913–1997), Sierra Leonean doctor known for his literary work and political agitation
- Ricky Easmon, an American former professional football player
