= William Smith (registrar) =

Ghanaian/Sierra Leonean civil servant (1816–1895)

William Smith (1816–1895) was a Gold Coast-Sierra Leonean civil servant who worked in Freetown, Sierra Leone, as a registrar for the Mixed Commissionary Court. Due to his position and through his marriage to wealthy Freetown Creoles, Smith became a prominent figure in Sierra Leone. Smith had 14 children. Dr. Robert Smith, Francis Smith, and Adelaide Casely-Hayford are the most well known of them.

== Background ==
William Smith was born in Cape Coast on 4 October 1816 to William Smith Sr and a Fanti woman who was the daughter of a Chief. William Smith Senior (1795–1875) was from Yorkshire, England, and first came to the Gold Coast in about 1820 to work with the African Company. Smith Sr retired in 1835 and died in about 1875. He had two sons, a legitimate son by his English wife, Frederick, and William Jr. who was illegitimate. Frederick would later work as a junior clerk in the courts. In 1825, Smith Sr became a Commissary Judge at the Courts of Mixed Commission in Freetown. In this role after the abolition of the slave trade he adjudicated cases involving captured slave-ships. He retired in 1835. The Smiths lived on a farm that their father had purchased from Governor Kenneth Macaulay and which was formerly owned by Governor Charles MacCarthy. Smith Jr. was educated by the Church Missionary Society.

== Career ==
Smith junior began as a clerk at the Courts of Mixed Commission, where his father was Commissary Judge, and later worked as a Registrar of the Courts. He held this position from 1850 to 1872. He also worked as a lay preacher for the Wesleyans alongside his friend, John Ezzidio. He also loved horse racing and gambling until he became a Wesleyan.

As registrar, Smith recorded the decisions of the courts regarding captured slave ships. He also served as a Justice of the Peace in the colony.

Smith retired in 1872 and moved from Freetown to England, first living in Norwood, London, and later to the Kenmuir, Saint Helier, Isle of Jersey, where he would enroll his two daughters in Jersey Ladies College.

== Family ==
Smith's first wife was Charlotte Macaulay, daughter of Governor Kenneth Macaulay. They had seven children, William Henry, Robert, Philippa, Mary, John Frederick, Francis, and Charlotte. Robert and Francis became notable figures. The elder Charlotte died at the age of 36.

Smith married his second wife, Ann Spilsbury (1840–2 June 1876) on 27 July 1858 at St. George's Cathedral. She was half-sister to Thomas Hamilton Spilsbury, the first African to be made the Head of a Medical Department in the British West African colonies. Their father was Joseph Green Spilsbury and Thomas married Smith's daughter, Philippa. Ann's mother was Hannah Carew Spilsbury. The Spilsbury family were wealthy merchants and Ann was of English, Jamaican Maroon, and Sierra Leone heritage.

Smith's children by his second wife were Joseph Spilsbury, Thomas, Emma, Casely, Elizabeth, Hannah, Adelaide, and Annette. Adelaide, later known as Adelaide Casely-Hayford, was a noted educator and feminist. Elizabeth and Hannah married noted brothers William Jarvis Awoonor Renner and Peter Awoonor Renner. Annette married prominent doctor John Farrell Easmon. Ann died in 1875.

After Ann's death, Smith married for a third time.

== Death ==
Smith died on August 6, 1896. Smith's will was filed in September 1896 and named his sons-in-law William Broughton Davies and William Jarvis Awooner Renner as co-executors.

== Bibliography ==
- Browne-Davies, Nigel. "William Smith, Registrar of the Courts of Mixed Commission: A Photograph of an African Civil Servant". The Journal of Sierra Leone Studies. Autumn 2014.
- Cromwell, Adelaide M., An African Victorian Feminist: The Life and Times of Adelaide Smith Casely Hayford 1848-1960. Routledge, 2014.
- Gale, Cengage Learning. A Study Guide for Adelaide Casely-Hayford's "Mista Courifer". Gale, Cengage Learning. in Introduction
- Hunter, Yema Lucilda. An African Treasure: In Search of Gladys Casely-Hayford 1904-1950. Sierra Leonean Writers Series, 2016.
- Mogase, Phuti. "Mission in Controversy: A revision of Adelaide Casely-Hayford's Approach" in Reller, Jobst. Frauen und Zeiten, LIT Verlag Munster, 2014, p. 44.
- Sutherland-Addy, Esi, and Aminata Diaw. Des femmes écrivent l'Afrique: L'Afrique de l'Ouest et le Sahel. Vol. 2. KARTHALA Editions, 2007.
