= Charles Easmon =

Charles Easmon may refer to:

- Charles Odamtten Easmon (1913–1994), Ghanaian surgeon and pioneer of cardiac surgery in West Africa
- Charles Syrett Farrell Easmon (1946–2025), British microbiologist and medical administrator

== See also ==
- M.C.F. Easmon (Macormack Charles Farrell Easmon, 1890–1972), Sierra Leonean physician, historian, and scholar
