= Yema Lucilda Hunter =

Sierra Leonean librarian and writer (1943–2022)

- Born: Yema Lucilda Caulker; 15 July 1943; Freetown, Sierra Leone
- Died: 21 August 2022 (aged 78–79)
- Education: Annie Walsh Memorial School
- Alma mater: University of Reading; North-Western Polytechnic; Loughborough University
- Occupations: Librarian, novelist and biographer
- Family: Caulker family of Sierra Leone

Lucilda Hunter, née Caulker (15 July 1943 – 21 August 2022) was a Sierra Leonean librarian, novelist and biographer, who wrote under the name Yema Lucilda Hunter.

== Life ==
Yema Lucilda Hunter was born on 15 July 1943 in Freetown, to parents Richard Edmund Kelfa-Caulker and Olivette Hannah Stuart. She was educated at the Annie Walsh Memorial School, before undertaking university studies in England. She gained a BA degree from the University of Reading in 1964, a post-graduate diploma in librarianship from North-Western Polytechnic in 1966, and a master's degree in philosophy from Loughborough University.

Hunter specialized in medical librarianship, spending time with the Sierra Leone Library Board and the Medical Library at Connaught Hospital. During her time at the hospital, she was the designated consultant to the Development of Public Library Service: Sierra Leone proposal that was submitted to the UNESCO in 1983. She retired from the Regional Office of Africa of the World Health Organization, having been in charge of the Library and Health Information unit, and became a fellow for the British Library Association in 1999.

She lived in Accra, Ghana, with her husband, Kobina Hunter (who died in January 2020), and died on August 21, 2022.

=== Family ===
Hunter's father worked at the Albert Academy, having been the first African principle of the institute. In the 1960s, he was the Sierra Leone High Commissioner to the United Kingdom and later, the Ambassador to the United States. Olivette Hannah Stuart's, Hunter's mother, grandfathers both worked within the colonial administration. Melvin Stuart, Stuart's paternal grandfather, moved from The Bahamas to Sierra Leone to by the Collector of Customs (picture of "The Senior Service" of Sierra Leone(1885), including Melvin Stuart) in 1878. Stuart's maternal grandfather, Arthur MacCarthy Stuart, was also a colonial civil servant, both men helping to establish the family as a prominent African-Caribbean family. Arthur Osman Farquhar Stuart, Lucilda Hunter's uncle and Arthur Stuart's son, also worked at the Connaught Hospital as a consultant physician. Kobina Hunter, Lucilda Hunter's husband, was the son of Gladys Casely-Hayford, who was a poet and author, and Arthur Hunter. Lucilda Hunter would publish an influential work in 2016 about her mother-in-law, having also written a book about Adelaide Casely-Hayford and her daughter, Galdys, in 1983.

=== Road to Freedom ===
Hunter's first novel, Road to Freedom (1982) was published during a time of emerging literature from Sierra Leone. The novel centers Deannie Nixon, a thirteen year old girl, and the settlement of the colony of Freetown. The story begins in Birchtown, Nova Scotia in 1791 and ends around 1817, taking the reader through the establishment of Freetown. Hunter is often praised for her historical accuracy while simultaneously focuses on one family and the disasters that befall them. Using her experience as a librarian, Hunter relied heavily upon historical texts including Two Voyages to Sierra Leone, A History of Sierra Leone, Thomas Peters: History and Legend, Freetown in 1794, Province of Freedom, and other resources at her disposal. Hunter details the tensions between the English settlers, the settlers from Nova Scotia, and the Indigenous tribes while using her imagination to tell a more personal story. She explores the significance of Christianity to the settlers, along with economic, domestic, personal, and social concepts to focus on the human experience during the settlement of Freetown, and subsequently Sierra Leone, establishing a narrative of searching for freedom.

Road to Freedom was later republished by Sondiata Global Media in 2016 and retitled Seeking Freedom.

== Works ==
- 1982. Road to Freedom. Ibadan: African Universities Press. (Later reissued in 2016 as Seeking Freedom.)
- 1983. Mother and daughter: memoirs and poems. Sierra Leone University Press
- 1989. Bittersweet. London: Macmillan.
- 2009. Builders: the Annie Walsh story, 1849-2009. Freetown: Independent Observer.
- 2012. Redemption Song. Freetown: Sierra Leonean Writers Series.
- 2013. Joy Came in the Morning. Accra: Sierra Leonean Writers Series.
- 2015. Nanna. Sierra Leonean Writers Series.
- 2016. An African Treasure: In Search of Gladys Casely-Hayford. Freetown: Sierra Leonean Writers Series.
- 2018. Her Name Was Aina. Freetown: Sierra Leonean Writers Series.
- 2022. Deep Waters. Freetown: Sierra Leonean Writers Series.
