= Awoonor-Renner family =

Sierra Leone Creole family

The Awoonor-Renner family or Awunor-Renner family is a Sierra Leone Creole medical, legal, and commercial dynasty with branches of the family in Ghana. The Awoonor-Renner, Awoonor-Wilson, Awoonor-Gordon families are branches of the Awoonor-Williams family that originated from Waterloo, Sierra Leone, and derived "Awoonor" from the Awuna territory in Keta. The Awoonor-Renner family has produced several distinguished doctors, lawyers, and businessmen in Sierra Leone, Ghana, and the United Kingdom. Alongside families such as the Dove family, Easmon family and Smith family, the Awoonor-Renners are among the wealthy Aristo or aristocratic Creole families. In the Gold Coast (present-day Ghana), the family was part of the country's African political elite and some members were affiliated with the Aboriginal Rights Protection Society (ARPS), which included such activists as John Mensah Sarbah, Kobina Sekyi and J. E. Casely Hayford.

== Notable members of the Awoonor families ==
=== Awoonor-Gordon family ===
- Olu "Ritchie" Awoonor-Gordon (1957-2011) - journalist based in Freetown

=== Awoonor-Renner and Awunor-Renner families ===
- Dr William Awunor-Renner – doctor who served as acting Principal Medical Officer and one-time Mayor of Freetown
- Peter Awoonor-Renner – lawyer and leader of the Gold Coast Bar
- William Awoonor-Renner III – lawyer in Freetown and the Gold Coast
- Dr Edward "Teddy" Awunor-Renner – doctor and the first African director of medical services in Sierra Leone
- Dr Kenneth Bernard Awoonor-Renner – medical doctor
- Bankole Awoonor-Renner (1898 -1970) – journalist and political activist
- Olabisi Awoonor-Renner (1923 - 1975) - lawyer and political activist
- William Roland Awunor-Renner – lawyer and judge
- Dr Walter Awoonor Renner - physician, first Ghanaian/Sierra Leone doctor trained in Germany, founder of Sierra Leone Medical and Dental Association, served as official doctor for the U.S. Embassy and UN Missions in Sierra Leone
- Raymond Awoonor-Renner – lawyer based in Freetown
- Thomas Renner - Deputy Mayor of Winooski, Vermont, USA
- William Renner (surgeon) (1846–1917), surgeon and cancer researcher.

=== Awoonor-Williams family ===
- Kofi Awoonor (1935–2013)
- George Brigars Awoonor-Williams (1929–1977)
- Francis (R.A.) Awoonor-Williams, founding member of the United Gold Coast Convention (UGCC)

== Sources ==
- Adelaide Cromwell, An African Victorian Feminist: The Life and Times of Adelaide Smith Casely Hayford 1848–1960. Reprinted Routledge, 2014, ISBN 9781317792116
- "William Awoonor-Renner", The Equiano Centre, UCL.
