= Charles Odamtten Easmon =

Ghanaian surgeon and academic (1913–1994)

Charles Odamtten Easmon FRCSEd, FICS, FGA, FWACS, GM
- Born: Charles Odamtten Easmon; 22 September 1913; Adawso, Gold Coast
- Died: 19 May 1994 (aged 80); Accra, Ghana
- Other names: Charlie, C. O.
- Education: Achimota College; University of Edinburgh (MBChB, DTM&H)
- Occupations: Medical doctor; Professor of medicine
- Years active: 1946 – 1993
- Known for: First Ghanaian surgeon; Medical education
- Title: Professor
- Spouse: Genevieve Dove (m. 1946)
- Children: 7, Linda; Kathleen; Charles Francis; Johnnie; Charlotte; Charles John; Susan
- Parents: John Farrell Easmon (father); Kate Salome Odamtten (mother)
- Relatives: List: William MacCormac (great-granduncle); John Farrell Easmon (grandfather); Albert Whiggs Easmon (granduncle); Macormack Charles Farrell Easmon (uncle); Raymond Sarif Easmon (uncle); Charles Syrett Farrell Easmon (cousin)
- Awards: Gold Coast Medical Scholar
- Scientific career
- Fields: Surgery
- Workplaces: University of Ghana Medical School

Charles Odamtten Easmon or C. O. Easmon, popularly known as Charlie Easmon, FRCSEd, FICS, FGA, FWACS, GM (22 September 1913 – 19 May 1994) was a medical doctor and academic who became the first Ghanaian to formally qualify as a surgeon specialist and the first Dean of the University of Ghana Medical School. In 1964, Easmon performed the first successful open-heart surgery in Ghana and modern scholars credit him as the "Father of Cardiac Surgery in West Africa". Easmon was of Sierra Leone Creole, Ga-Dangme, African-American, Danish, and Irish ancestry and a member of the distinguished Easmon family, a Sierra Leone Creole medical dynasty of African-American descent.

== Family and background ==
Charles "Charlie" Odamtten Easmon was born on 22 September 1913, in Adawso on the Gold Coast, to Kate Salome Odamtten (1893–1940) and John Farrell Easmon (c. 1881–1920). Charles Odamtten Easmon was the first child of his mother and his younger siblings were Jonas Nii Lamptey, Laura Quartey, née Lamptey, and Mary A. Sackeyfio, née Lamptey.

John Farrell Easmon, the father of Charles Odamtten Easmon, was a merchant or an accountant for a tin mining company in Jos, Nigeria, and was a son of John Farrell Easmon, a member of the Easmon family medical dynasty, and Carolyn Augustt, a descendant of the Richter family from Osu, Accra. John or Victor Farrell Easmon was one of several children born to J. F. Easmon in the Gold Coast, including Walter Farrell Easmon and Agnes Joanna Easmon (b. 1895). Dr J. F. Easmon was a Sierra Leone Creole of African-American and Northern Irish descent; J. F. Easmon was also the first West African Chief Medical Officer. Carolyn Augustt, who was described as a "mulatress", was a mixed-race descendant of the Richter family, a Ga-Danish clan and the Augustt family, possibly of German or Scottish descent. Carolyn Augustt was from Osu Trom Mom in Accra.

John Farrell Easmon died in Jos, Nigeria, and Charles Odamtten Easmon was raised by his mother, although he still kept close personal ties with the Easmon family in Sierra Leone and in Ghana, such as his half-brother Jesse Easmon, who worked at Korle-Bu Teaching Hospital. Easmon's mother, Kate, was from a prominent Osu family of Ga-Dangme and Danish descent. His maternal grandmother was from the Lokko family of Osu, which was originally from Denmark and Germany, and his maternal uncles included Willie P. Fleischer of Ga-Dangme and Danish descent and Solomon Edmund Odamtten, a business magnate, who was active in national politics.

Charles Odamtten Easmon had several prominent Sierra Leone Creole relatives in his patrilineal lineage, including his great-uncle, Albert Whiggs Easmon, a leading surgeon and physician in Sierra Leone; uncles, Edward Mayfield Boyle, a medical doctor in the United States who completed courses at Harvard Medical School, Dr Macormack Charles Farrell Easmon, an Old Epsomian who was the first West African to earn an M.D. from London University and Raymond Sarif Easmon, who had a popular private practice and was an eminent playwright, and an aunt, Kathleen Mary Easmon Simango, who was the first West African to earn a diploma from the Royal College of Arts. Furthermore, Charles Odamtten Easmon was also the cousin of Professor Charles Syrett Farrell Easmon CBE, an emeritus professor and high-ranking medical administrator and Edna Elliott-Horton, the second West African woman to attend university and the first West African woman to earn a liberal arts degree.

=== Lokko and Odamtten families ===
Furthermore, on Charles Odamtten Easmon's maternal grandparents' side, the Lokko family, of German, Danish, and Ga descent and the Odamtten family of Ga provenance have produced several prominent personalities such as Lesley Lokko, a Ghanaian-Scottish architect, academic, and novelist, Nii Osah Odamtten, a former President of the Ghana Institute of Architects; Erasmus Odamtten, a former NASA Space Shuttle engineer; Sylvanus Odamtten, a former Vice Chancellor of the University of Cape Coast as well as George Tawia Odamtten, a botanist and a Fellow of the Ghana Academy of Arts and Sciences. Easmon was also an uncle of Sophia Odamtten (1922–2006), an educationist and a women's leader in the Presbyterian Church of Ghana, whose husband, Gottlieb Ababio Adom (1904–1979) was a Presbyterian minister, educator, editor and journalist on the Gold Coast.

== Early life and education ==
Charles Odamtten "Charlie" Easmon was enrolled at Osu St. Thomas School in 1918 and he later attended the Osu Presbyterian Boys' Boarding School (also known as Osu Salem, Salem, or the Salem School at Osu), in 1928. After winning a Cadbury scholarship, Easmon attended the prestigious Achimota College alongside future Ghanaian president, Kwame Nkrumah and Theodore S. Clerk, Ghana's first architect. While at school, Easmon was known for his drawings, and his teachers believed he would become an artist. A gifted athlete and a member of the Student Christian Movement while at Achimota School, Easmon on completing his secondary education earned a colonial government scholarship to study medicine at the University of Edinburgh. The government scholarship he won to study medicine in Edinburgh in 1935 made him the third Gold Coast Medical scholar after Oku Ampofo (1933) and Eustace Akwei (1934). Easmon qualified with an MB.ChB. in 1940 and also earned a diploma in tropical hygiene and medicine (DTM&H) in 1941 from the same university.

In 1946, Easmon returned to Edinburgh with the intention of qualifying as a Fellow of the Royal College of Surgeons of Edinburgh, and became the first Ghanaian to be admitted there as a Fellow, following the completion of his medical course.

== Career ==
=== Early career ===
Upon his return to the Gold Coast, he worked at Korle Bu Hospital in Accra, and was eventually put in charge of the hospital. In June 1959, he left Ghana for the United States on a five-month fellowship offered by the US State Department in order to create understanding between Ghana and the United States. He was assigned at the Mayo Clinic in Rochester, Minnesota, and was elected as a Fellow of the International College of Surgeons.

=== Chief Medical Officer and the UGMS ===
In 1960, Kwame Nkrumah appointed Easmon as the Chief Medical Officer of Ghana and Easmon assumed this role in September 1962. Easmon served with distinction in this position, but was reassigned to an academic post as the first Dean and Professor of surgery at the newly established University of Ghana Medical School (UGMS). Although he was initially reluctant to take on an academic post, he served with distinction in this role.

== Personal life ==
On 5 September 1946, he married Genevieve Dove (1921–2015), the daughter of Francis "Frans" Thomas Dove, a Sierra Leonean barrister, at the Holy Trinity Cathedral in Accra. Easmon had seven children: Linda Y. Nkemdirim (née Easmon), Kathleen Rettenmund (née Easmon) and Charles Francis Easmon, Charlotte M. Holdbrook (née Easmon), Dr. Charles John James Easmon, and Dr. Johnnie Easmon and Susan Miranda Easmon. Easmon was a member of the District Grand Lodge of Ghana under the United Grand Lodge of England and the Deputy District Grandmaster of the Masonic District of Ghana.

== Later years and death ==
Easmon was an active member and founder of the Osu Medical Association, which was founded to serve the people of Osu in Accra. He was also elected as a Fellow of the Ghana Academy of Arts and Sciences and served as the president of the academy from 1977 to 1980. He designed the logo of the Ghana Medical Association. He had a foray in national politics – between 1979 and 1981, he was the National Vice Chairman of the now-defunct centrist party, the United National Convention.

Easmon retired entirely from his medical profession in July 1993. His lucrative private practice and free treatment of patients had made him a household name throughout Ghana. He frequently travelled on trips to Europe with his wife, and was known for his active involvement in social and civic activities. C. O. Easmon was a Chairman of the Accra Turf Club. His grandfather, John Farrell Easmon, had been a member of the club and participated in races with his horse, "His Lordship", which won the Governor's Cup on several occasions. Easmon reportedly became one of the first owners of a Mercedes Benz in Ghana when he bought a Mercedes Benz W186 model 300 in cash at a showroom in Germany.

Charles Easmon died on 19 May 1994, at the age of 80. He was survived by his wife, Genevieve, and his seven children.

== Legacy, honours and accomplishments ==
Professor Charles Odamtten Easmon achieved a number of firsts in his lifetime. To name a few, he was the first Ghanaian to professionally qualify as a surgeon; the first Ghanaian to obtain a Fellowship of the Royal College of Surgeons Edinburgh; the first Ghanaian to obtain a Fellowship of a college in any branch of medicine; the first Ghanaian to be appointed Surgical Specialist; the first Ghanaian to be appointed Chief Surgeon of Ghana; the first Ghanaian to be appointed Chief Medical Officer in the Ministry of Health; the first president of the Ghana Medical Association; the first Dean and the first Professor of Surgery of the University of Ghana Medical School; the first Ghanaian to be president of the West African College of Surgeons; the first Ghanaian to be elected a Fellow of the International College of Surgeons; the first Chairman of the Ghana Medical and Dental Council and the first Chairman of the Council for Scientific Research into Plant Medicine.

Easmon was awarded a Grand Medal by the Ghanaian government in 1968 and received an Honorary Doctorate of Science from the University of Cape Coast.

The College of Health Sciences dedicated its building to the memory of Easmon in 2012, with a bust of him being unveiled by his wife, Genevieve Easmon. The University of Ghana Medical School also presents the "Charles Easmon Prize in Surgery" to the best medical student in surgery. A ward at the 37 Military Hospital in Accra was named after Easmon.
