= M.C.F. Easmon =

M.C.F. Easmon OBE
- Dr. M. C. F. Easmon, standing on the right
- Born: Macormack Charles Farrell Easmon; 11 April 1890; Accra, Gold Coast
- Died: 2 May 1972 (aged 82); Surrey, England
- Other names: M.C.F., Charlie
- Education: CMS Grammar School, Freetown; University of London
- Occupation: Physician
- Spouse: Enid Winifred Shorunukeh-Sawyerr
- Relatives: List: John Farrell Easmon (father); Albert Whiggs Easmon (paternal uncle); Adelaide Casely-Hayford (maternal aunt); Raymond Sarif Easmon (first cousin); Charles Odamtten Easmon (nephew)
- Writing career
- Language: English

Macormack Charles Farrell Easmon, OBE, (11 April 1890 – 2 May 1972), was a Sierra Leone Creole born in Accra in the Gold Coast (modern-day Ghana), where his father John Farrell Easmon, a prominent Creole medical doctor, was working at the time. He belonged to the notable Easmon family of Sierra Leone, a Creole family of African Nova Scotian and African-American descent.

== Background and early life ==
Macormack Charles Farrell Easmon was born on 11 April 1890 in Accra, Gold Coast, to John Farrell Easmon, a Sierra Leonean of African-American and Irish descent and his wife, Kathleen Annette Easmon (née Smith), a Sierra Leonean of Jamaican Maroon, Fante, and English descent. Macormack Easmon descended from prominent Sierra Leonean families and had numerous ancestors who distinguished themselves in the civil service and medical field. Easmon was named "McCormack" or "MacCormac" after his great-grandfather John MacCormac, who was the uncle of William MacCormac.

John Farrell Easmon (1856–1900) was a prominent Sierra Leonean medical doctor with a distinguished medical career, who was the first West African to serve as Chief Medical Officer of a British West African territory. The Easmon family are Sierra Leone Creoles who descend from the original settlers of the Freetown Colony, the Nova Scotian Settlers. Macormack Easmon's paternal uncle was Albert Whiggs Easmon, a prominent gynaecologist in Freetown. Through his maternal lineage, J. F. Easmon was descended from the MacCormac family and was a nephew of Sir William MacCormac.

William Smith Jr. was the son of Judge William Smith, a Londoner who settled on the Gold Coast and was a judge in the Mixed Commissionary Court in Freetown. Anne Spilsbury was the daughter of Joseph Green Spilsbury and Hannah Carew. J. G. Spilsbury's father was George Green Spilsbury, a distant relative of Bernard Spilsbury, and Elizabeth Fowler, a Jamaican Maroon woman. Hannah Carew was the daughter of Thomas and Betsy Carew, both Liberated Africans.

== Education ==
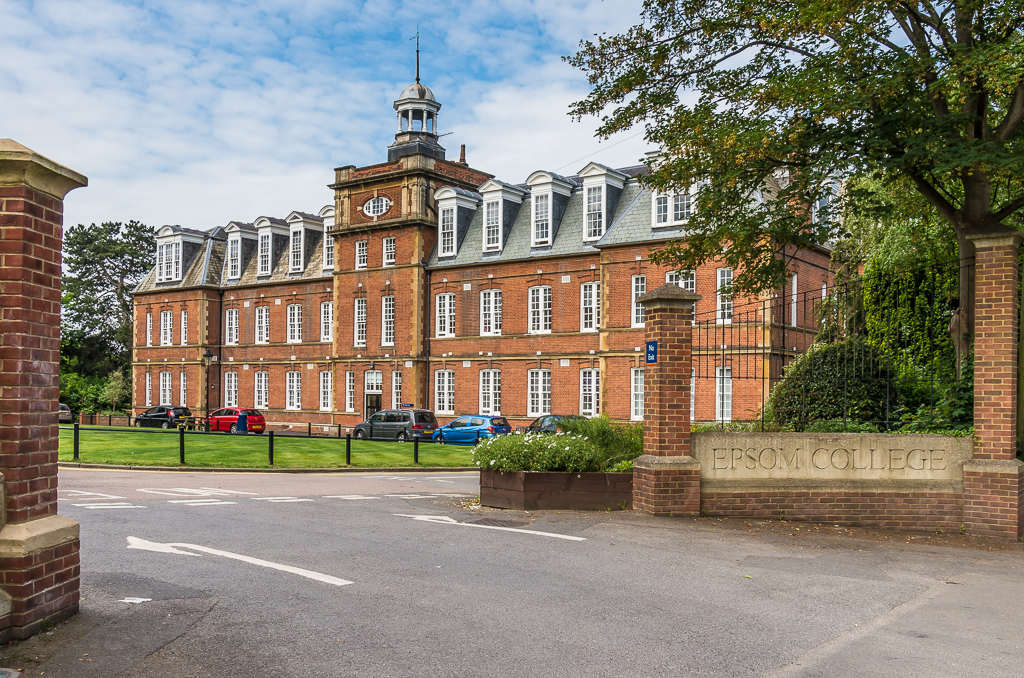
Epsom College

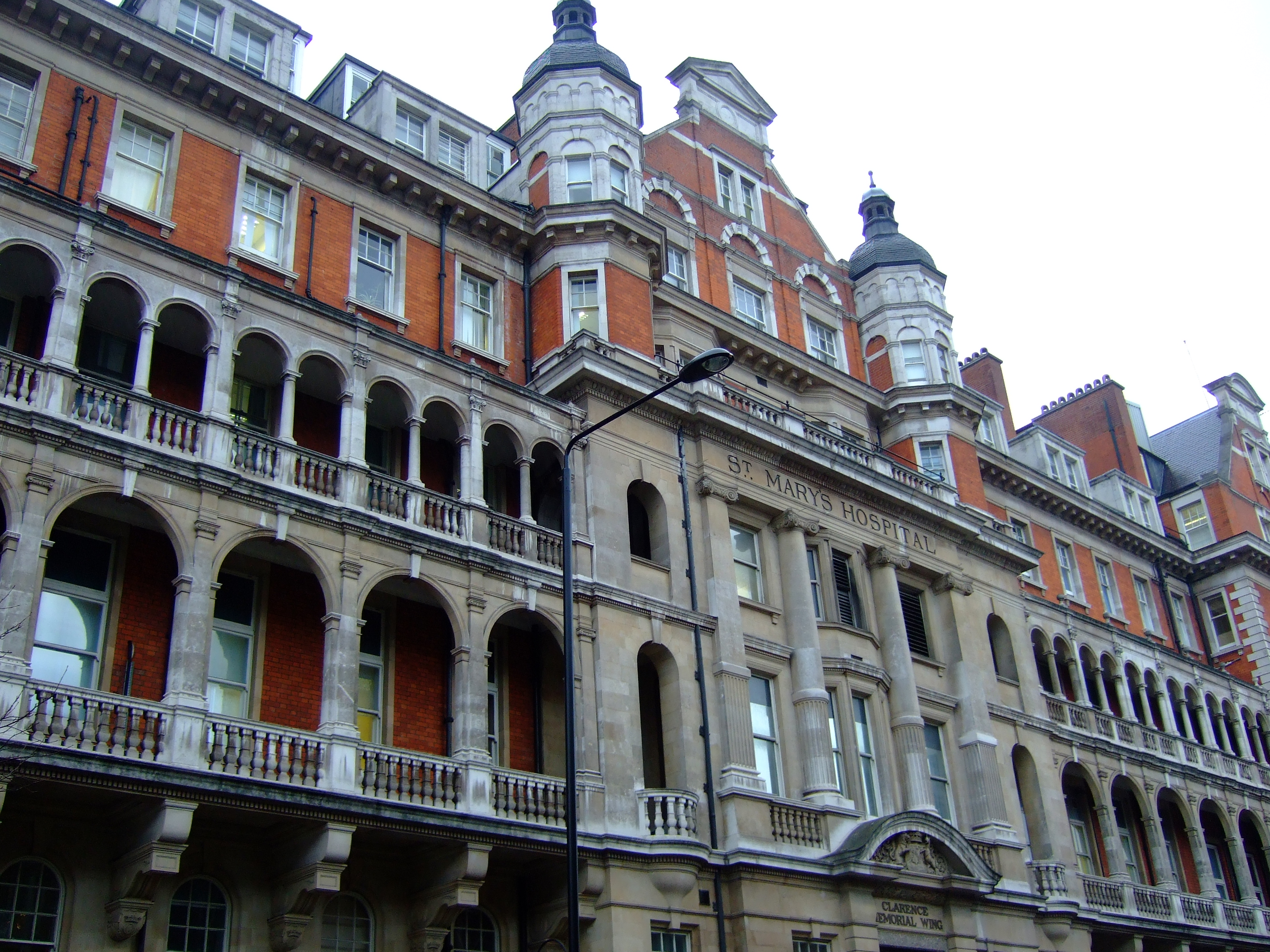
St Mary's Hospital, London

Easmon was educated for six months at the CMS Grammar School in Freetown and later at Colet Court School, the preparatory school for St Paul's Preparatory School in London.

He went on to attend Epsom College in Surrey, where he played on the rugby team and won prizes in history and divinity.

After graduating in 1907, Macormack Easmon was awarded a scholarship to study medicine at the Medical School of St. Mary's Hospital in London.

After a distinguished academic career, Easmon qualified in medicine and surgery in 1912, and in the following year passed the examination of the London School of Tropical Medicine.

== Personal life ==
In 1920, Easmon married Enid Winifred Shorunukeh-Sawyerr, daughter of a prominent Creole family. They had one child, Charles Syrett Farrell Easmon, who became a professor in medical studies in the United Kingdom.

=== Relatives ===
- Through his mother, Easmon was the nephew of Adelaide Casely-Hayford.
- Easmon was a first cousin of Raymond Sarif Easmon.
- Easmon was the uncle of Charles Odamtten Easmon, the first Ghanaian surgeon.

== Retirement and legacy ==
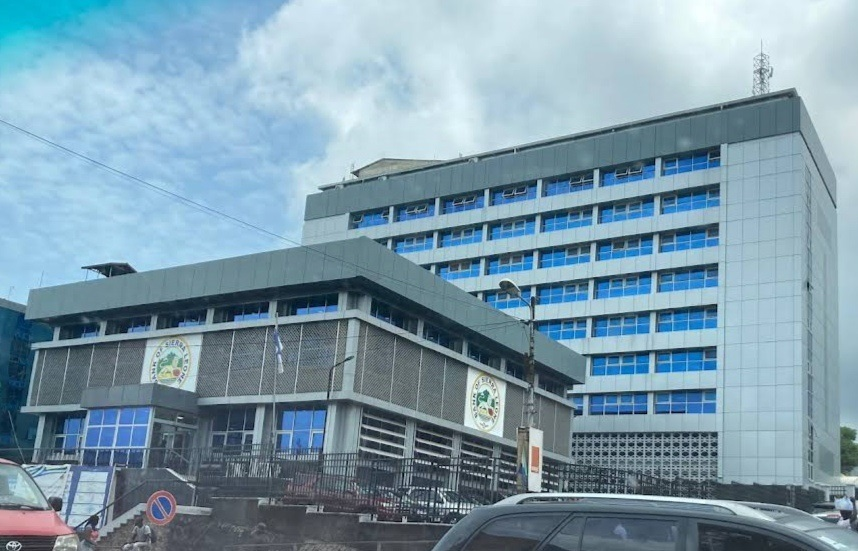
Bank of Sierra Leone

As a member of the Sierra Leone Society, he spearheaded the founding of the Sierra Leone National Museum in 1958 and became its first curator. Easmon was also instrumental in the Monuments and Relics Commission alongside other Sierra Leoneans such as Ernest Jenner Wright and Wilmot A. Dillsworth, a Freetown city town clerk. Easmon worked relentlessly to acquire worthy exhibits for the museum and to set up attractive displays. He also hosted a popular radio programme called Sierra Leone in Retrospect.

M.C.F Easmon was also one of the first directors of the Bank of Sierra Leone alongside Dr Davidson Nicol and Claude Nelson-Williams.

In 1954, Easmon was awarded the Order of the British Empire (OBE).
