= Peter Awoonor-Renner =

Gold Coast lawyer (c. 1861–1938)

Peter Awoonor-Renner OBE
- Born: c. 1861; Freetown, Sierra Leone
- Died: 1938 (aged 76–77)
- Education: Sierra Leone Grammar School; Lincoln's Inn
- Occupation: Lawyer
- Spouse: Hannah Smith (m. 1886)
- Children: Bankole Awoonor-Renner (son)
- Relatives: Sally Mugabe (granddaughter)

Peter Awoonor-Renner (c. 1861–1938) was a Sierra Leone Creole lawyer who mainly practised in the Gold Coast. Renner was an active member of the Gold Coast Aborigines' Rights Protection Society (ARPS) founded in 1897 in Cape Coast.

== Early years ==
Peter Awoonor-Renner was born in Freetown, Sierra Leone about 1861, the son of William Renner, a merchant. Renner was educated at the Sierra Leone Grammar School, which was then named the Church Missionary Society Grammar School. He trained as a barrister at Lincoln's Inn, London, commencing his pupilage on 22 May 1880, when he was just 19 years old. He was called to the bar on 18 April 1883. In 1884, Awoonor-Renner travelled to the Gold Coast, becoming the second qualified African to practise law there.

== Legal career ==
In 1897, the British attempted to introduce a Lands Bill in the Gold Coast. There was significant opposition to the Bill which was seen as usurping the traditional rights of indigenous people to their own land. Protests culminated in a legal challenge being made to the Legislative Council of the Gold Coast, on behalf of the ARPS, by John Mensah Sarbah, assisted by Awoonor-Renner and C. J. Bannerman. Despite the legal arguments put before the Legislative Council the Bill was only withdrawn in 1898 when a delegation travelled from the Gold Coast to Britain to petition the colonial secretary, Joseph Chamberlain.

== Personal life ==
Awoonor-Renner married Hannah Smith on 24 June 1886 in St. Helier, Jersey. He was 25, she was 23. Hannah gave birth to their son on 16 August 1891. He was christened Ernest Spencer de Jersey Awoonor-Renner on 18 September 1891 in St Brelade, Jersey.

Awoonor-Renner attended Christ Church in Cape Coast.

He travelled with his family from the Gold Coast to Britain, arriving in Liverpool on 4 July 1926.

== Later years ==
Awoonor-Renner was appointed an Officer of the Order of the British Empire (OBE) in 1937 for public services in the Gold Coast. He died in 1938.

== Legacy ==
Awoonor-Renner is related to Africans who were involved in independence struggles. He was the father of Bankole Awoonor-Renner, a journalist and political agitator involved in the struggle for independence of the Gold Coast. He was also the maternal grandfather of Sally Mugabe, the first wife of Robert Mugabe, who was involved in the Zimbabwe independence struggle, alongside her husband.

Awoonor-Renner features in The Pen-Pictures of Modern Africans and African Celebrities. He is described as Captain of the Gold Coast Territorial Force.

== See also ==
- Awoonor-Renner family
- Sierra Leone Creole people
