= Edward Mayfield Boyle =

Sierra Leone Creole medical doctor

Edward Mayfield Boyle (24 June 1878 – 21 November 1936) was a Sierra Leone Creole medical doctor who attended Harvard Medical School. Boyle, was one of the first West Africans to attend Howard University College of Medicine and was the maternal uncle of Edna Elliott-Horton, who was possibly the first West African woman to graduate from Howard University.

== Early life ==
Edward Mayfield Boyle was born on 24 June 1878 in Freetown, Sierra Leone, to Charles Boyle and Sarah Easmon, both of whom were of African-American descent. Sarah Easmon was a member of the Easmon family. Boyle was a maternal nephew of Albert Whiggs Easmon, a leading physician and surgeon in Freetown, and John Farrell Easmon, one-time Chief Medical Officer of the Gold Coast who coined the term "Blackwater fever".

Boyle attended the Wesleyan (Methodist) Boys' High School in Freetown, and attended Zion Methodist Church, Wilberforce Street, a Settler church founded by the early African-American founders of the Colony of Sierra Leone and the settlement of Freetown. He was an ideological disciple of Edward Wilmot Blyden, a Caribbean pan-Africanist scholar who taught in Liberia and Sierra Leone.

== Education and medical career ==
Boyle obtained a scholarship and financial assistance to attend Howard University College of Medicine and qualified as a medical doctor. Boyle completed courses at Harvard Medical School and Meharry Medical College.

== Death ==
Boyle died in Baltimore, Maryland, on 21 November 1936 and was survived by his wife Bertha and daughter Leone B., Son’s Blyden and Mayfield Jr.

== Sources ==
- Adell Patton Jr., Physicians, Colonial Racism, and Diaspora in West Africa
- "Boyle, Edward Mayfield", Who's Who in Colored America: A Biographical Dictionary of Notable Living Persons of African Descent in America (New York: Who's Who in Colored America Corporation, 1937)
