= CMS Grammar School =

CMS Grammar School may refer to:

- CMS Grammar School, Lagos
- CMS Grammar School, Freetown, now the Sierra Leone Grammar School
