= George Brigars Williams =

Ghanaian actor

- Born: 8 January 1929; Sekondi, Western Region of Ghana
- Died: 1 August 2016 (aged 87); Korle Bu Teaching Hospital in Accra
- Education: Adisadel College
- Occupation: Actor
- Children: 5

George Brigars Williams (8 January 1929 – 1 August 2016) was a Ghanaian actor.

== Early life and education ==
He was born on 8 January 1929 in Sekondi, Western Region of Ghana, to Nora Awoonor Williams and Francis Awoonor Williams. He had ancestral ties with the Awoonor Williams family and the Awoonor-Renner family.

He attended Aggrey Memorial Secondary School, Achimota School and Adisadel College in Cape Coast, Ghana from 1941 to 1945 for his secondary education, Nelson College from 1948 to 1950 and Balham & Tooting College of Commerce in the United Kingdom from 1950 to 1952 after which he studied acting at the Stage Craft Centre in London, United Kingdom.

== Filmography ==
- Ultimate Paradise
- Build Your Ark
- His Majesty's Sergeant

== Professional life ==
Apart from his acting career in Ghana, Williams also performed in Julian Green's South at the London's Arts Theatre. He also joined the musical ballet Caribbean Heatwave at the Little Theatre in Jersey. He made a series of programmes on the BBC West African Service and made several recordings with great jazz musicians in England such as Hurry Cline, Mike Makenzie, Shake Kean and Joe Harriot. He acted in movies including: Last Hope, Genesis Chapter X, Black Sunday, Dirty Deal, Friday At 4:30, Justice, The Young And The Old, Bloody Mary, My Sister's Honor as well as in Ghana's award-winning soap opera, Ultimate Paradise. He also taught acting at the Accra Film School (AFS), an Accra-based private film and television training institute.

== Personal life ==
William was married and had five children. He died on 1 August 2016, aged 87, at the Korle Bu Teaching Hospital in Accra.
