= Arthur Stuart (disambiguation) =

Arthur Stuart, 7th Earl Castle Stewart (1889–1961) was an Anglo-Irish peer and politician.

Arthur Stuart may also refer to:

- Arthur Stuart, 8th Earl Castle Stewart (born 1928)
- Arthur Osman Farquhar Stuart (1927–2002), Sierra Leonean medical doctor
- Arthur Stuart, a character in Velvet Goldmine
- Arthur Stuart, a character in Heartfire

== See also ==
- Arthur Stewart (disambiguation)
