= Charles Syrett Farrell Easmon =

British microbiologist and medical professor (1946–2025)

Professor Charles Syrett Farrell Easmon CBE FRCPath FMedSci
- Born: 20 August 1946
- Died: 21 March 2025 (aged 78)
- Education: St Mary's Hospital Medical School
- Occupation: Medical doctor
- Years active: 1969-2025
- Known for: Contributions to microbiology, medical education, and the NHS
- Spouse: Dr Susan Lynn Easmon
- Parents: Macormack Charles Farrell Easmon (father); Enid Winifred Shorunukeh-Sawyerr (mother)
- Relatives: List: William MacCormac (great-granduncle); John Farrell Easmon (grandfather); Albert Whiggs Easmon (granduncle); Raymond Sarif Easmon (uncle); Charles Odamtten Easmon (cousin)

Charles Syrett Farrell Easmon, CBE (20 August 1946 – 21 March 2025), was a British microbiologist and medical professor who made significant contributions to medical education in Britain. He was a descendant of the distinguished Easmon family.

== Education ==
Charles Easmon attended Epsom College and qualified with an M.B.B.S, M.R.C.S. and L.R.C.P. from St Mary's Hospital Medical School in 1969. Between 1975 and 1976, he qualified with an MRCPath and a PhD, and in 1981, Easmon gained an M.D.

== Career ==
After qualifying as a medical doctor, Easmon specialised in medical microbiology and in 1976 was appointed as the senior lecturer at St Mary's Hospital Medical School in addition to being an honorary consultant at St Mary's hospital.

In 1980, Easmon was appointed a reader in bacteriology and became the head of the Medical Microbiology department at St. Mary's Hospital Medical School. Easmon was the first clinical director of pathology in 1989 at St Mary's Hospital and became dean of postgraduate medicine in the University of London.

In 1995, Easmon was appointed as the director of education and training for North Thames and he was responsible for the education and training levies and the education consortia in North Thames. In 2003, Easmon became professor of health policy at the Thames Valley University and retired in 2010 after being appointed emeritus professor.

== Recognition ==
Dr C.S.F. Easmon was listed in the 2000 New Year Honours list and in 2000 he was made a Commander of the Order of the British Empire for his contributions to medical education. He was a Founding Fellow of the Academy of Medical Sciences.

== Death ==
Easmon died from cancer on 21 March 2025, at the age of 78.

== Selected works ==
- Medical Microbiology Series (Volume I-V)
- The induction and control of cell-mediated hypersensitivity to staphylococcus aureus in mice
- The Diagnosis and Management of Bacterial Vaginosis (Round Table)

== Sources ==
- https://web.archive.org/web/20140723071722/http://cptpcevent.co.uk/speakers
- https://web.archive.org/web/20160305045401/http://www.health-old.uwl.ac.uk/research/about.asp
- bbc.co.uk
- Physicians, Colonial Racism and Diaspora in West Africa
- https://web.archive.org/web/20130625131234/http://www.hpa.org.uk/NewsCentre/NationalPressReleases/2010PressReleases/100325executiveappointments/
- https://web.archive.org/web/20140302172144/http://www.cieh.org/events/leading-the-new-public-health.html
