= Essi Matilda Forster =

Ghanaian lawyer (1922–1998)

- Born: Essi Matilda Christian; 12 September 1922; Sekondi, Gold Coast (now Ghana)
- Died: August 1998 (aged 75); Accra, Ghana
- Education: Gray's Inn
- Occupation: Lawyer
- Known for: First female native of the Gold Coast to qualify as a lawyer; Third woman in British West Africa to qualify as a lawyer
- Spouse(s): Edward Francis Bani Forster, m. 1944
- Children: 3

Essi Matilda Forster (12 September 1922 – August 1998) was a Ghanaian lawyer and the first female native of the Gold Coast (now Ghana) to qualify as a lawyer.

== Early life and education ==
Forster was born to George James Christian, and Aba Lucy French, in Sekondi, the Gold Coast, on 12 September 1922. Her father hailed from the Eastern Caribbean island of Dominica but settled in the town of Sekondi in 1902. He considered himself a "returned exile" after attending the First Pan-African Conference organised in London in 1900. He was a businessman and a private legal practitioner who represented the Western Province as a member of the Gold Coast Legislative Council from 1930 to 1940. Forster's mother hailed from Shama in the Western Region of the then Gold Coast.

Forster begun her education in England when she was five years old. In England, she was called to the bar at Gray's Inn in November 1945. On 15 April 1947, she was called to the Bar in the Gold Coast. She then became the first female Gold Coast native to become a lawyer, and the third woman in British West Africa to accomplish this feat. She was preceded by the Nigerian lawyer and first African woman to attain this feat, Stella Thomas, and Frances Claudia Wright, a Sierra Leonean lawyer who became the second woman in Africa to become a lawyer.

== Career ==
Following her call to the Bar in the Gold Coast, Forster was called to the Gambian Bar, then worked in Gambia as a lawyer from 1947 to 1951. In July 1951, she returned to the Gold Coast with her husband Edward Francis Bani Forster when the latter was appointed by the then colonial administration to work at the Accra Mental Hospital. Forster took up a job as the acting registrar of births, deaths and companies. She worked in this office for about six months. From 1957 to 1982 she was the legal counsel for Mobil Oil Ghana Limited.

Aside from legal practice, Forster engaged in other public and professional activities. She was a member of a number of committees and organizations, some of which she helped to establish. She was a founding member of the Ghana International School Committee, and served on the committee from 1954 to 1959. She also served on the Accra Magisterial District Prohibition Committee as a member, around the aforementioned period. She helped found the Accra branch of the Inner Wheel Club, and the International Federation of Women Lawyers (FIDA) in Ghana, serving as the association's president. In her lifetime, Forster played active roles in the Young Women's Christian Association (YWCA). She served as its vice-president and secretary of its Hostel committee. From 1969 to 1972, she was the chairperson of the Accra Nurses and Midwives School Board of Governors, and from 1972 to 1975, she was a substitute member of the World Association of Girl Guides and Girl Scouts' Constitution Committee, while presiding over the Ghana Girl Guides.

== Personal life and death ==
Forster married professor Edward Francis Bani Forster, the Gold Coast psychiatrist of Gambian descent, on 17 December 1944. They had three children; a daughter and two sons. She was a Christian and a congregant of the Accra Ridge Church, where she worked as the Sunday School secretary for about 17 years, from 1963 to 1980. Her hobbies included walking and volunteering. She died in August 1988 aged 75. At the time, she was the most experienced lawyer at the Ghana Bar. Her burial service took place at the Accra Ridge Church, on 14 August 1998.

== See also ==
- List of first women lawyers and judges in Africa
