= Arthur Stewart =

Arthur Stewart may refer to:

- Tom Stewart (politician) (Arthur Thomas Stewart, 1892–1972), Democratic United States Senator from Tennessee
- Arthur Stewart, Duke of Rothesay (1509–1510), second son of James IV of Scotland and Margaret Tudor
- Arthur Stewart, Duke of Albany (1541–1541), second son of James V of Scotland and Mary of Guise
- Arthur Stewart (footballer) (1942–2018), Northern Ireland former international footballer
- Arthur Dudley Stewart (1877–1948), British missionary to Hong Kong
- Art Stewart (1927–2021), baseball player
- Art Stewart (producer) (died 2021), Motown Records producer and engineer

== See also ==
- Arthur Stuart (disambiguation)
