= Robert Smith (surgeon) =

Sierra Leonean medical doctor (1840–1885)

Robert Smith FRCSE
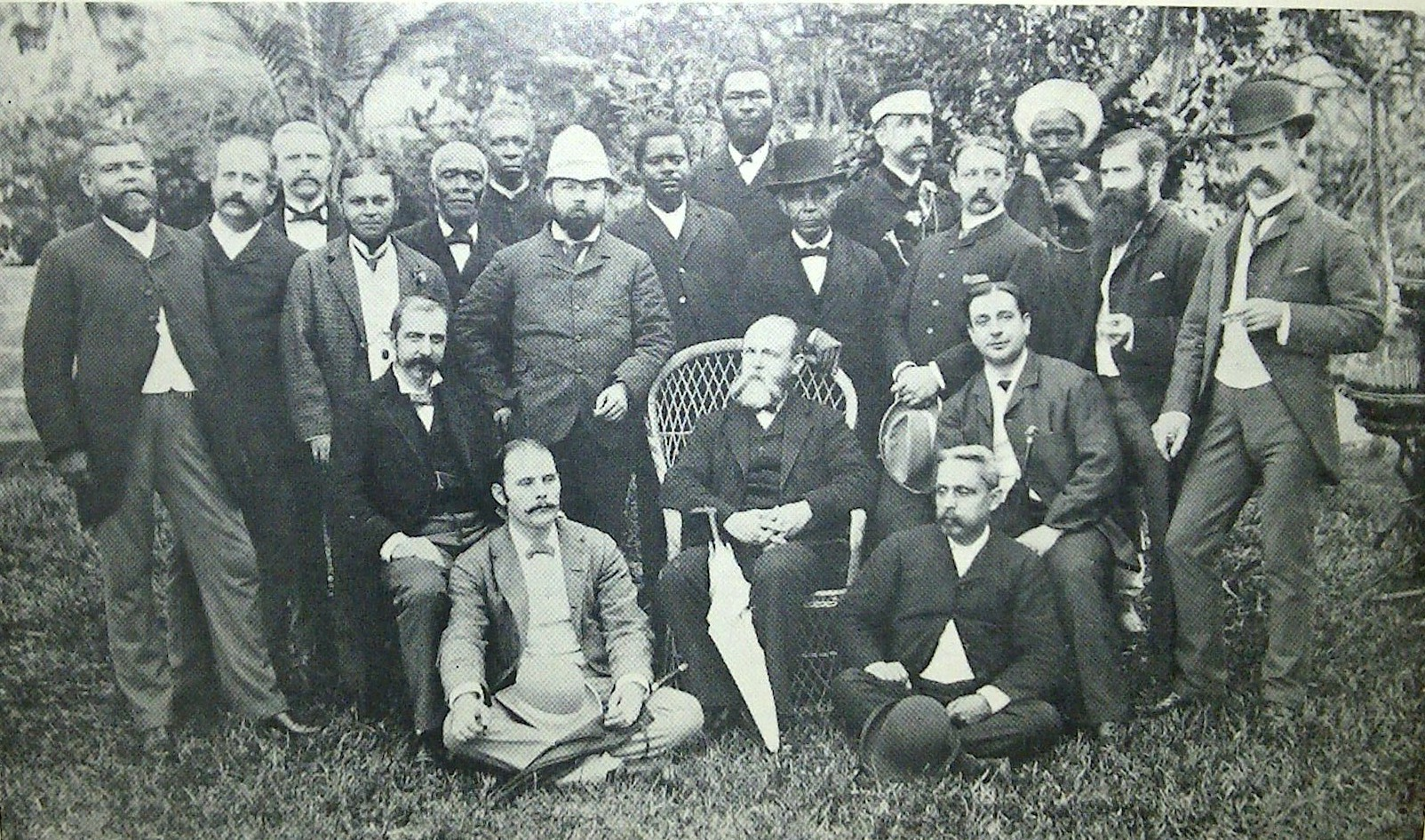
- Smith (standing, fourth from left) in 1885
- Born: Robert Smith; 30 June 1840; Freetown, British Sierra Leone
- Died: 4 July 1885 (aged 45); Charlotte Street, Freetown, British Sierra Leone
- Other name: Bob Smith
- Education: Queen Elizabeth Grammar School, Wakefield, University of Glasgow, University of Birmingham, University of Edinburgh
- Occupation: Assistant Colonial Surgeon
- Spouse: Annie Mary Pine (married 1865–1885)
- Writing career
- Language: English

Robert Smith FRCSE (1840–1885) was a Sierra Leonean medical doctor who served as an Assistant Colonial Surgeon in Sierra Leone during the late nineteenth century. Smith was the first African to become a Fellow of the Royal College of Surgeons of Edinburgh after completing his medical studies at the University of Edinburgh.

== Early life ==
Smith was born in Freetown, Sierra Leone, then a British colony, to William Smith Jr., (1816–1896) and Charlotte Smith (née Macaulay). William Smith was born in Cape Coast to Esi, a Fante princess and William Smith Sr., a Yorkshireman who served as judge of the Mixed Commissary Court in Freetown, Sierra Leone. Charlotte Macaulay was a Liberated African and the daughter of Kenneth Macaulay, a second cousin of Zachary Macaulay and uncle of Lord Macaulay. Robert Smith was the second son of seven children born to William Smith from his first marriage to Charlotte Macaulay.

== Education ==
Robert Smith briefly attended the Church Missionary Society Grammar School in Freetown, but in 1855 he entered the Queen Elizabeth Grammar School, Wakefield in Yorkshire, England. After completing his secondary education, he entered the Royal College of Physicians and Surgeons of Glasgow, completing his studies in 1865 with a double qualification in medicine and surgery, and becoming registered 12 May 1866. He became the first West African to become a Fellow of the Royal College of Surgeons on 18 October 1871.

== Career ==
After completing his medical degree, Smith returned to Sierra Leone and served as deputy inspector of the Health and Shipping Department. Smith was a popular doctor in Freetown and highly sought after by the ageing Settler and Maroon community in the Settler Town and Maroon Town area. Smith's warmth and skills as doctor led to promotion and he was eventually appointed Assistant Colonial Surgeon. Smith also lectured in anatomy and physiology at Fourah Bay College from 1879 to 1884, and taught a number of future Sierra Leonean medical doctors including John Farrell Easmon. In 1881 he became a non-resident fellow of the Royal Colonial Institute.

== Family ==
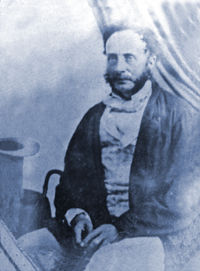
Governor Benjamin Chilley Pine

On 21 July 1865, Smith married Annie Mary Pine, the daughter of Governor Benjamin Chilley Campbell Pine. The couple lived at Smith's family house at Charlotte Street and had at least three children, Chilley Smith, Charlotte A. Smith, and Florence Mary Smith (1869–1883).

Smith was the brother of Francis Smith, (1847–1912), the second Sierra Leonean to qualify as a barrister at the Middle Temple. Francis Smith was the maternal grandfather of Frances Wright, the first Sierra Leonean female to qualify as a barrister. Smith' sister, Mary Smith, married Dr. William Broughton Davies (1831–1906), a Sierra Leonean physician of Yoruba Liberated African stock.

Through his father's second marriage to Ann Spilsbury, the granddaughter of Dr. George Green Spilsbury, a colonial physician, Robert Smith was the half brother of Adelaide Casely-Hayford, a well known Sierra Leonean educationalist and writer. Smith was also the brother-in law of Dr. William Awoonor-Renner, a Sierra Leonean physician and Peter Awoonor-Renner, a Sierra Leonean barrister. Smith had inherited property from his paternal grandfather, Kenneth Macaulay, and owned a house at Gloucester Street. Following his death in 1885, Chilley Smith inherited his father's property and provided accommodation to his aunts, Adelaide Casely-Hayford and Emma Smith.

== Death and legacy ==
Smith died unexpectedly on 4 July 1885 of "malignant bilious intermittent fever." Smith was a popular figure among the elite in Sierra Leone, and he served as vice-president and president of the Sierra Leone Eccentric Club. Smith lent £100 to a friend, John Henry Thomas who later became a successful and prosperous merchant. Described as a "dandy", Smith was known for his warmth and his humorous stories of his experiences of studying in Britain.

It was widely believed that Smith would eventually be promoted to Colonial Surgeon and only his death was the barrier to his promotion to this position. Following his death, the Sierra Leone Krio would lose favor with the colonial government and save for Dr. William Jarvis Awoonor-Renner and Dr. Albert Whiggs Easmon, few Sierra Leoneans would have the opportunity to serve the colonial government in so high a position as Smith.
