= Joseph Whittal =

Ghanaian politician

3rd Commissioner for Human Rights and Administrative Justice
- Incumbent
- Assumed office December 2016
- President: John Mahama
- Preceded by: Lauretta Lamptey

Personal details
- Education: University of Ghana; Ghana School of Law; University of Cape Coast
- Profession: Lawyer

Joseph Akanjolenur Whittal is a Ghanaian who is the Commissioner of Human Rights and Administrative Justice of Ghana since December 2016.

== Education ==
Joseph Whittal attended the University of Ghana where he studied Law between 1985 and 1988. He proceeded to the Ghana Law School where he studied from 1988 to 1990. He was awarded the Premier Best student Prize Certificate in Industrial Law while at the Ghana Law School. Between 2005 and 2006, he studied for a Master of Arts degree in Democracy, Governance and Human Rights at the University of Cape Coast.

== Work ==
His first job was as a Legal Officer with the Legal Aid Board at its zonal office in Tamale between 1990 and 1991 as part of his national service. He then worked as a legal officer at the Office of the Revenue Commissioners from 1991 to 1992. In 1992, he was appointed State Attorney at the Ministry of Justice and Attorney – General's Department where he worked for two years.

== Commission on Human Rights and Administrative Justice ==
Whittal joined the Commission on Human Rights and Administrative Justice (CHRAJ) in 1994. His first position in the organisation was as the Upper East Regional Director. He served as the Director for the Legal and Investigations Department between 2008 and 2012. He was promoted Deputy Commissioner in charge of the same department from 2012, his last position before becoming the Commissioner. He was appointed the Commissioner in December 2016 by President John Mahama. This was shortly after the December 2016 general election which Mahama lost. The New Patriotic Party which had won the election and was due to take office under Nana Akufo-Addo a few weeks later expressed disapproval at his appointment.

Political offices
Preceded by Lauretta Lamptey	Commissioner for Human Rights and Administrative Justice; 2016 — present	Incumbent
