= Kathleen Mary Easmon Simango =

Sierra Leonean missionary and artist

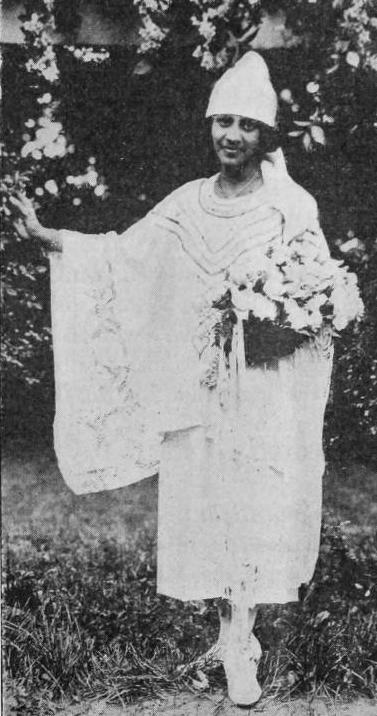
- Kathleen Mary Easmon Simango in her wedding gown, from a 1922 publication.
- Born: Kathleen Mary Easmon; 9 August 1891; Accra, Gold Coast
- Died: 20 July 1924 (aged 32); London, England
- Occupations: Artist and missionary
- Spouse: Columbus Kamba Simango
- Parent(s): John Farrell Easmon and Annette Kathleen Easmon, née Smith

Kathleen Mary Easmon Simango (9 August 1891 – 20 July 1924) was a Sierra Leonean missionary and artist who was the first West African to earn a diploma from the Royal College of Art. She was the niece of Adelaide Casely-Hayford and was a personal friend of Samuel Coleridge-Taylor. Simango was also a member of the prominent Sierra Leone Creole Easmon family.

== Early years and education ==
Kathleen Mary Easmon was born on 9 August 1891 as the younger of two children in Accra, Gold Coast (present-day Ghana), to Dr John Farrell Easmon and Annette Kathleen Easmon, née Smith. Kathleen was educated at Slaford House School, then Notting Hill High School from 1903 to 1907, then the Girls' Modern School, Bedford, from 1907 to 1908, and finally studied at the Royal College of Art in London.

She began writing poetry at a young age, and when she was still a teenager some of her poems were set to music by composer Samuel Coleridge-Taylor, who was a family friend.

== Personal life ==
She was married to Columbus Kamba Simango, an East African teacher educated at Hampton Normal and Agricultural Institute and Columbia University.

== Death ==
Kathleen Easmon died of appendicitis, aged 32, on 20 July 1924 at Charing Cross Hospital, London, England. Her obituary in The Times described her as "[o]ne of the most cultured women that West Africa has yet given the world".

== Sources ==
- M. C. F. Easmon, "A Nova Scotian Family", Eminent Sierra Leoneans in the nineteenth century (1961).
- Adell Patton Jr., "Dr. John Farrell Easmon: Medical Professionalism and Colonial Racism in the Gold Coast, 1856–1900", The International Journal of African Historical Studies, Vol. 22, No. 4 (1989), pp. 601–636.
- Adell Patton Jr., "The Easmon Episode", Physicians, Colonial Racism, and Diaspora in West Africa, pp. 93–122.
