= Connaught Hospital =

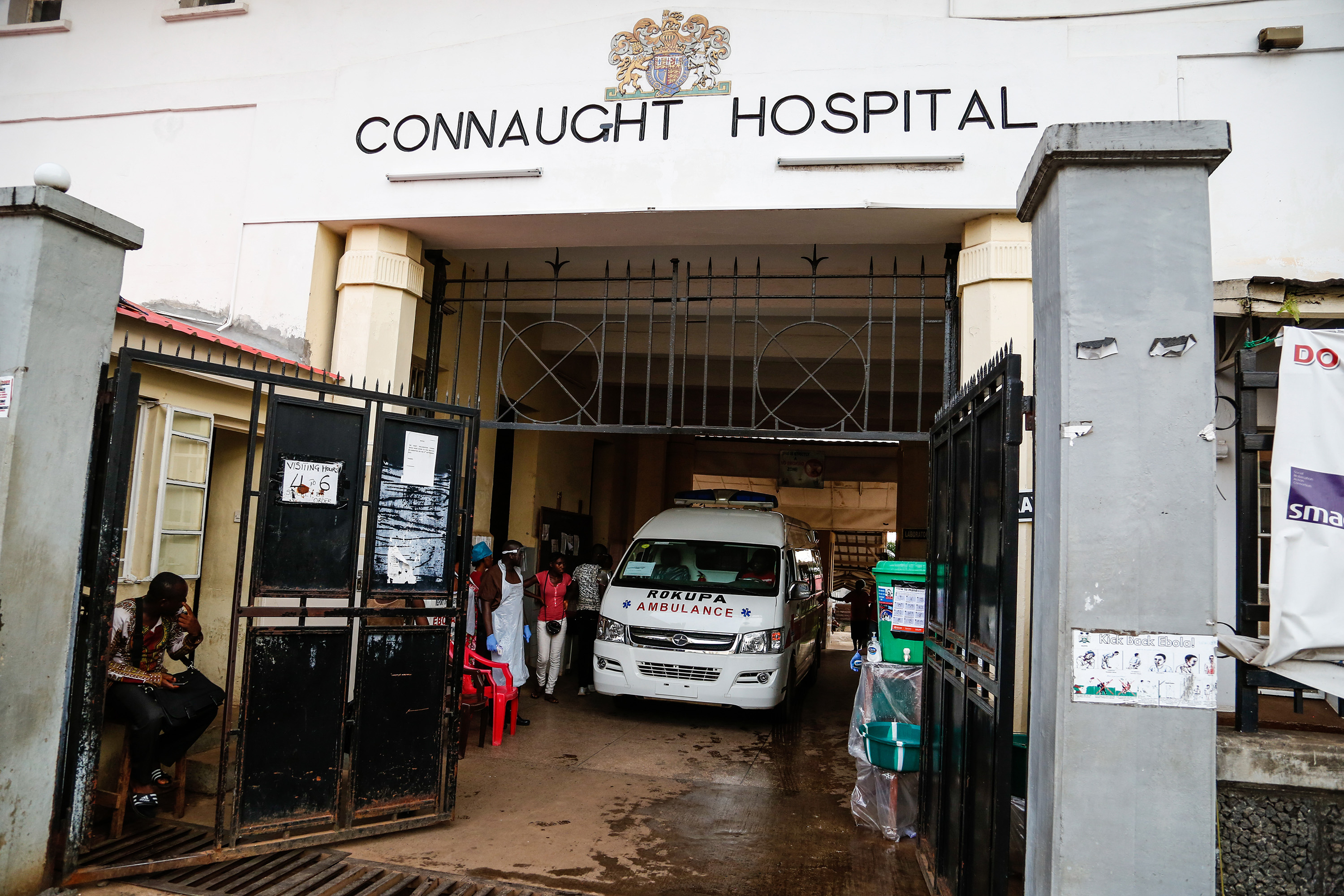
- Hospital entrance

Geography
- Location: Sierra Leone
- Coordinates: 8.488431°N 13.238409°W

Organisation
- Type: Teaching, District General
- Affiliated university: University of Sierra Leone

Services
- Emergency department: Yes
- Beds: 350

Helipads
- Helipad: No

History
- Founded: 1912; 114 years ago

Links
- Lists: Hospitals in Sierra Leone

Connaught Hospital is the principal adult referral hospital in Sierra Leone.

Connaught Hospital was opened in 1912 by the Duke of Connaught, Prince Arthur. President Kabbah re-opened the hospital on May 5, 2006, alongside the Princess Christian Missionary Hospital (PCMH).

== Notable doctors and herbalists ==
- John Augustus Abayomi-Cole – medical doctor and herbalist
- Robert Wellesley Cole (1907–1995), general surgeon and first West African to become a Fellow of the Royal College of Surgeons
- William Broughton Davies (1831–1906), first West African to qualify as a medical doctor
- Arthur Farquhar Stuart (1927–2002), consultant physician
- William Robert Priddy (1926–2003), medical practitioner and Fellow of the Royal College of Obstetricians and Gynaecologists
- William Renner (1846–1917), oncologist and Assistant Surgeon-General during the colonial era

== Developments ==
The UK government and Sierra Leone government commissioned a improved public laboratory in the hospital to improved public health in the country .

== Director ==
The chief medical director of the hospital Dr. Mark I. Kapuwa.

== See also ==
- 2014 Ebola virus epidemic in Sierra Leone
