= Kenneth Macaulay (colonialist) =

Kenneth Macaulay (1792–1829) was a merchant and colonial official in British Sierra Leone during the early nineteenth century. Macaulay served as Acting-Governor of Sierra Leone and was appointed as a member of His Majesty's Colonial Council. He was a second cousin of Zachary Macaulay, the abolitionist and member of the Clapham Sect.

== Early life and background ==
Kenneth Macaulay was born to Aulay Macaulay and Rachel Macaulay, née Rome, and was a member of the Macaulay family of Lewis. Kenneth Macaulay was baptised at Crosby Upon Eden, Cumberland, England on 5 September 1792.

Kenneth Macaulay was a second cousin of Zachary Macaulay, a former Governor of Sierra Leone, who had been appointed by the Sierra Leone Company to govern during the pre-Crown colony era. Kenneth Macaulay arrived in the colony in 1808 at the age of sixteen years old to take up the position of government writer. Several Liberated Africans adopted the surname 'Macaulay' or 'Macauley' after Kenneth, who was in charge of distributing provisions to the Liberated African Department.

== Political career ==
Macaulay was appointed as a managing agent of Macaulay and Babington, the largest European mercantile firm in Freetown, Sierra Leone. Kenneth Macaulay served in several positions of influence in the Colony of Sierra Leone during the early nineteenth century. He was appointed as a Member of the Colonial Council of Sierra Leone, and was hence styled as 'Honourable Macaulay'. Macaulay was also appointed as Acting-Governor of Sierra Leone. He was a member of the jury during the trial of Samuel Samo, the first court case brought under the British Slave Trade Felony Act 1811. He was drawn into the controversy concerning his cousin Zachary when Robert Thorpe, the Chief Justice in the colony criticised Macauley's poor accountancy standards, and Macauley was removed from his position in 1815. Although unversed in the law, Macaulay was appointed as Acting Chief Justice of Sierra Leone on several occasions.

== Defense of the Colony of Sierra Leone ==
Critics of the Colony of Sierra Leone such as James McQueen, a Scottish advocate of slavery, decried the purpose of founding a colony for ex-slaves and discredited Kenneth who had several children by mistresses of African descent. Macaulay wrote a spirited defence of the Colony of Sierra Leone entitled, The Colony of Sierra Leone Vindicated, which provided some insight into the political, economic and social aspects of early colonial Freetown society. Kenneth Macaulay was a raconteur and he held several banquets for the European community in Freetown, Sierra Leone. Macaulay was also keen horse racer and he won the Governor's Cup on several occasions.

== Death ==
After surviving several outbreaks of yellow fever in the colony, Kenneth Macaulay died on 5 June 1829 after suffering from a bout of yellow fever. He was buried in Freetown, Sierra Leone. He bequeathed several prime properties in Freetown, Sierra Leone to his children of partial African descent.

== Descendants ==
Macaulay had at least seven children in Sierra Leone, including John Macaulay, George Macaulay, Charles Macaulay, Commodore Collier Macaulay, Charlotte Macaulay, and Margaret Macaulay. Kenneth had a brief relationship with Mary Harding and had several children with Abboo Shaw and Harriet Sleight (Slight), both Liberated Africans possibly from modern-day Ghana or Nigeria.

Macaulay has several notable Sierra Leone Creole descendants, including Francis Smith, Robert Smith, Frances Claudia Wright, and Emile Short.
