= Lauretta Lamptey =

Lauretta Vivian Lamptey

2nd Commissioner for Human Rights and Administrative Justice
- In office 26 July 2011 – November 2015
- President: John Atta Mills
- Preceded by: Emile Short
- Succeeded by: Joseph Whittal

Personal details
- Education: University of Ghana; London School of Economics
- Profession: Lawyer, Investment banker

Lauretta Vivian Lamptey is a former Ghanaian Commissioner on Human Rights and Administrative Justice. She is a lawyer and an investment banker.

== Education ==
Lamptey had her secondary education at Aburi Girls' Senior High School prior to studying law at the University of Ghana, Legon where she gained the LL. B. in 1980. She continued to the Ghana School of Law, where she qualified as a barrister in 1982. In 1986, she gained admission to studied international business law at the London School of Economics and Political Science of the University of London, where she acquired the LL. M. degree in 1987.

== Work ==
In 1990, Lauretta Lamptey was the head of the Capital Markets Group at Ecobank Ghana. She moved from there to become head of corporate finance at Cal Merchant Bank in 1996. In 1999, she joined Loita Capital Partners International as a legal and corporate finance adviser. She worked in this capacity until 2001. From 2004 to 2007, she worked on consulting assignments with Letsema Consulting and Advisory.

Lamptey is also known to have provided legal, financial and investment advice to the Government of Ghana on transactions related to mining, energy and natural resources. She is on the board of directors of the Ghana Commercial Bank. She has also been on the Securities Discount Company (SDC) and Gliksten W. A. and is a founder member of the board of the Ghana Stock Exchange.

== Commission on Human Rights and Administrative Justice ==
Lauretta was sworn in as the Commissioner on 26 July 2011 by President John Atta Mills. Her appointment proved popular with gender activists including Adjoa Bame of NETRIGHT. She was removed in November 2015 by President Mahama following investigations by the Chief Justice of Ghana following allegations made against her.

Political offices
Preceded by Emile Short	Commissioner for Human Rights and Administrative Justice; 2011 — 2015	Succeeded by Joseph Whittal
