= Easmon family =

Sierra Leone Creole family

- John Farrell Easmon (seated) and his brother Albert Whiggs Easmon
- Current region: Freetown, Sierra Leone
- Origin: United States
- Founded: Arrival in Sierra Leone; 11 March 1792, Freetown; 234 years ago
- Founder: William Easmon
- Members: List: John Farrell Easmon; Albert Whiggs Easmon; Macormack Charles Farrell Easmon; Kathleen Mary Easmon Simango; Raymond Sarif Easmon; Charles Syrett Farrell Easmon; Charles Odamtten Easmon
- Connected members: Edward Mayfield Boyle; Edna Elliott-Horton
- Distinctions: activism; education; medicine; natural sciences; politics; public health; the arts

The Easmon family or the Easmon Medical Dynasty is a Sierra Leone Creole medical dynasty of African-American and African Nova Scotian descent originally based in Freetown, Sierra Leone. The Easmon family has ancestral roots in the United States, and in particular Savannah, Georgia and other states in the American South. There are several descendants of the Sierra Leonean family in the United Kingdom and the United States, as well as in the Ghanaian cities of Accra and Kumasi. The family produced several medical doctors beginning with John Farrell Easmon, the medical doctor who coined the term Blackwater fever and wrote the first clinical diagnosis of the disease linking it to malaria and Albert Whiggs Easmon, who was a leading gynaecologist in Freetown, Sierra Leone. Several members of the family were active in business, academia, politics, the arts including music, cultural dance, playwriting and literature, history, anthropology, cultural studies, and anti-colonial activism against racism.

The Easmon family was among the wealthy, upper-class and aristocratic Creole families, known locally as the Aristos and descended from one of the original black American founding families which established the Colony of Sierra Leone in 1792.

== History ==
The surname Easmon is a variation of the English surname "Eastman" derived from "Eastmond". The Easmon family descends from the 1,192 African Americans known in Sierra Leone as the Nova Scotian Settlers who established the Colony of Sierra Leone and the city of Freetown. The earliest known progenitor of the Easmon family was William Easmon, (d. 1831), an African American trader possibly from North Carolina, who was one of the original Nova Scotian Settler emigrés from Nova Scotia, Canada, who established Freetown, Sierra Leone on 11 March 1792. William Easmon had at least one son with his first wife, Mary Easmon and had several children, including Walter Richard Easmon (1824–1883), with his second wife, Jane Easmon. Walter Richard Easmon was a merchant based in the Republic of Guinea who was married three times. Walter Richard Easmon was the father of three children with his second wife, Mary Ann MacCormac, including John Farrell Easmon. Walter Easmon was also the father of Albert Whiggs Easmon with Mah Serah, a Susu woman from the Republic of Guinea.

Several branches of the Easmon family intermarried with Creole families of African American, Jamaican Maroon, Northern Irish, French, and English descent including the Boyle, Cuthbert, Elliott, George, MacCormac, Maillat, and Smith, and Spilsbury families. The Easmon family also extends to Ghana and branches of the family in Ghana intermarried mainly with Ga-Dangme families of Sierra Leone Creole, Danish, Scottish, and Welsh descent including the Dove, Augustt, and Evans families.

Members of the Easmon family were prominent in the medical field in the nineteenth and twentieth centuries. Foremost among the nineteenth century doctors of the family were John Farrell Easmon and Albert Whiggs Easmon. The twentieth century was largely dominated by the careers of Macormack Charles Farrell Easmon, who served in the colonial medical service and Raymond Sarif Easmon who established himself in private practice.

== Contributions ==
=== First generation ===
- The Easmon family contributed to medical field following the qualification of J.F. Easmon and A.W. Easmon in 1879 and 1895 respectively. John Farrell Easmon coined the term "Blackwater fever" and was the first to link the disease directly to malaria. J.F. Easmon was also the first and only British West African in the nineteenth century to be substantively appointed as a Chief Medical Officer or Principal Medical Officer of a British West African territory. Albert Whiggs Easmon was a pioneering gynaecologist in Freetown who received a purse of £100 from the ladies of Freetown.
- Edward Mayfield Boyle (1874–1936), the son of Charles Boyle and Sarah Easmon, was a medical practitioner who attended Howard University College of Medicine and was also one of a select group of African American medical doctors who completed courses at Harvard Medical School. Boyle wrote a pamphlet that criticised the discriminatory practices of the British colonial administration towards medical doctors.

=== Second generation ===
- Macormack Easmon was the first West African to receive a Medical Doctorate from London University and challenged colonial racism in the British West African medical service. Easmon was commissioned as a Lieutenant with the West African Medical Staff between 1914 and 1915 in the Kamerun campaign and was the only black African to receive a commission in the First World War as an officer and received the medals, Pip, Squeak and Wilfred for his service during the War. Macormack Easmon was the founder of the Sierra Leone Museum and as Chairman of the Sierra Leone Monuments and Relics Commission designated several heritage sites in Sierra Leone including Bunce Island long before international interest in the slave fort.
- Kathleen Mary Easmon Simango was a talented cultural dance performer, artist and musician, and intended missionary who was the first West African to earn a diploma from the Royal College of Arts. Kathleen Easmon was an active supporter of her maternal aunt, Adelaide Casely-Hayford, and travelled to the United States with her aunt to raise funds for Casely-Hayford's proposed school. Alongside her aunt, Easmon was an honorary member of the Zeta Phi Beta, an African-American sorority.
- Edna Elliott-Horton, a niece of Edward Mayfield Boyle, was reportedly the second British West African woman to attend a university when she enrolled and completed her studies at Howard University and the first West African woman to earn a liberal arts degree.
- Raymond Sarif Easmon was a prize-winning scholar at Durham University who wrote several critically acclaimed plays and novels and was a critic of successive governments in Sierra Leone, in particular the governments of Albert Margai and his successor, Siaka Stevens.

=== Third generation ===
- Charles Syrett Easmon, a grandson of J.F. Easmon, was appointed as a professor in his early thirties and a high-ranking medical administrator, who received a CBE for his contributions to the medical field in 2000.
- Charles Odamtten Easmon, a grandson of J.F. Easmon, was the first Ghanaian to qualify as a surgeon and was a pioneer cardiac surgeon and gynaecologist credited by modern scholars as the Father of Cardiac Surgery in West Africa. C. O. Easmon was a high-ranking Freemason and was reportedly one of the first Ghanaians to own a Mercedes-Benz when he bought a Mercedes-Benz S-300 from a showroom in Germany.

== Commemoration and recognition ==
Recognition

- Macormack Charles Farrell Easmon was created OBE in 1954 for his contribution to medical services.
- Charles Odamtten Easmon was decorated with a Grand Medal by the Republic of Ghana in 1968.
- Charles Syrett Farrell Easmon was invested with a CBE for his contribution to medical services and education in 2000.

Commemoration

- Easmon Road in Accra, Ghana commemorates John Farrell Easmon.
- Charles Easmon Prize in Surgery in honor of Charles Odamtten Easmon is awarded to the most outstanding graduating student in surgery at the University of Ghana Medical School.
- Easmon Building, College of Health Sciences, University of Ghana Medical School in memory of Charles Odamtten Easmon.
- Easmon Ward, 37 Military Hospital in honour of Charles Odamtten Easmon.

== Notable members ==
- Albert Whiggs Easmon (1865–1923), Sierra Leonean doctor, half-brother of Dr John Farrell Easmon.
- Charles Odamtten Easmon, FRCS, FICS, FGA, FWACS, GM (1913–1994), first Ghanaian surgeon and pioneer of cardiac surgery in West Africa.
- Charles Syrett Farrell Easmon, CBE, MD, PhD, MRCP, FRCPath, FMedSci, (born 1946), British microbiologist and medical professor.
- John Farrell Easmon, MRCS, LM, LKQCP, MD, CMO, (1856–1900), prominent Sierra Leonean Creole doctor, Chief Medical Officer of the Gold Coast during the 1890s.
- Kathleen Mary Easmon Simango (d. 1924), Sierra Leonean missionary and artist who was the first West African to earn a diploma from the Royal College of Arts.
- Macormack Easmon, OBE (1890–1972), physician from Accra, son of John Farrell Easmon.
- Raymond Sarif Easmon (1913–1997), Sierra Leonean doctor known for his literary work and political agitation.

== See also ==
- Easmon, surname
- Nova Scotian Settlers
- Sierra Leone Creole people
- Americo-Liberians
- Gold Coast Euro-Africans

== Sources ==
- M. C. F. Easmon, "A Nova Scotian Family", Eminent Sierra Leoneans in the nineteenth century (1961)
- Adell Patton, Jr., "Dr. John Farrell Easmon: Medical Professionalism and Colonial Racism in the Gold Coast, 1856–1900", The International Journal of African Historical Studies, Vol. 22, No. 4 (1989), pp. 601–636
- Adell Patton Jr., "The Easmon Episode", Physicians, Colonial Racism, and Diaspora in West Africa, pp. 93–122
