= Odamtten =

Surname list

Odamtten is a patronymic surname of Ga-Dangme origins, derived from the Ga male name, Odamete. It is borne by the La people of Accra, Ghana. Notable people with the surname include:

- Charles Odamtten Easmon (1913–1994), first Ghanaian surgeon and first Dean of the University of Ghana Medical School
- George Tawia Odamtten (born 1948), Ghanaian mycologist
- Isaac Odamtten, Ghanaian politician
- Sonya Winton-Odamtten, American professor, writer and television personality
