= Edna Elliott-Horton =

Sierra Leonean scholar and activisist (1904–1994)

Professor Edna Elliott-Horton
- Born: Edna Elliott; 13 September 1904; Freetown, British Sierra Leone
- Died: 26 March 1994 (aged 89); Freetown, Sierra Leone
- Education: Howard University
- Occupation: Political activist

Edna Elliott-Horton (13 September 1904 – 26 March 1994) was the second West African woman from a British colony to receive a university degree after the Nigerian physician Agnes Yewande Savage, who received a medical degree from the University of Edinburgh in 1929. A Sierra Leonean, Elliott-Horton became the first West African woman to complete a BA degree in the liberal arts, after graduating from Howard University in 1932, where Dr. Edward Mayfield Boyle, her maternal uncle, had graduated as a medical doctor. Elliott-Horton was a political activist who challenged the colonial authorities in Sierra Leone through her participation in the West African Youth League which was formally established in her living-room.

== Background ==
Edna Elliott-Horton was born on 13 September 1904 in Freetown, Sierra Leone, to a prominent Creole family of African-American Settler stock. Both sides of Horton's families were descended from the original African-American founders of Sierra Leone known as the Settlers or Nova Scotian Settlers who were the original founders of the 1792 Sierra Leone Colony.

Elliott-Horton's mother was descended from the Easmon family, while through her paternal ancestry she was also a direct descendant of the original Nova Scotian settler, Reverend Anthony "Papa" Elliott (1775–1856) of Zion Methodist Church, Wilberforce Street. The Elliotts resided on Little East Street in the heart of Settler Town, Sierra Leone, the African-American district of Freetown.

She was elected as assistant organising secretary of the West African Youth League.

== Personal life ==
Edna Elliott-Horton was married to Moses Horton, a Creole of Liberated African, and Jamaican Maroon descent and the couple had a daughter, Dr Regina Mosena Horton.

== Sources ==
- Adell Patton, Physicians, Colonial Racism and Diaspora in West Africa, Gainesville, FL: University Press of Florida, 1996. ISBN 978-0813014326.
