= E. F. B. Forster =

Ghanaian academic and psychiatrist

Edward Francis Bani Forster GM
- Born: Edward Francis Bani Forster; 16 December 1917; Banjul, The Gambia
- Occupations: Academic; physician
- Spouse(s): Essi Matilda Forster, m. 1944

Academic background
- Education: Sierra Leone Grammar School; Trinity College, Dublin

Academic work
- Institutions: University of Ghana

Edward Francis Bani Forster, FRSA, FWACP, was a Gambian physician and academic based in Ghana. He was the first Gambian psychiatrist, and a professor of Psychiatry at the University of Ghana. He served as the president of the West African College of Physicians from 1983 to 1984.

Forster was a foundation member of the Medical Research Council of Psychiatry, and a foundation fellow of the West African College of Physicians. He was a fellow of the Royal Society of Arts, a member of the Association for the Advancement of Psychotherapy, USA, a member of the Royal College of Psychiatry, and a member of the Association of Psychiatrists of Africa.

== Early life and education ==
Forster was born on 16 December 1917 in Banjul, Gambia. He had his early education at the St. Mary's Primary School in Banjul, Gambia from 1923 to 1932. In 1932, he was enrolled at Church Missionary Society Grammar School in Freetown, Sierra Leone, for his secondary education and graduated in 1937. That year he entered Trinity College, Dublin, Ireland, where he obtained his Licentiate of Medicine in 1943, and his Diploma in Psychological Medicine in 1950. He subsequently qualified as a member of the Royal College of Physicians, and a member of the British Medical Association.

== Career ==
Forster began his career as a house surgeon at the Birmingham Accident Hospital, in the West Midlands of England, in 1943. In 1944, he joined Warlingham Park Mental Hospital as a house physician. That same year, he was appointed assistant medical officer at the Central Mental Hospital in Hatton. He worked there for about two years, after which he was made a general practitioner in Birmingham, England. Forster returned to Gambia in 1946 and served under the colonial medical services until 1951. He joined the Ministry of Health in Accra, Ghana where he worked as a consultant in Psychiatry and later, doctor in charge of the Accra Mental Hospital. He served in this capacity until 1970 when he gained employment at the University of Ghana.

After serving for about 19 years as the doctor in charge of the Accra Mental Hospital, Forster was appointed associate professor of Psychiatry at the University of Ghana Medical School. In 1972, he was elevated to the status of a professor and head of the Psychiatry Department of the University of Ghana Medical School. He was president of the West African College of Physicians from 1983 to 1984.

Forster was a recipient of the Grand Medal of Ghana in 1973.

== Personal life ==
Forster was the son of Hannah Forster, the first Gambian female politician, and the brother of Catherine Collier, who was the first Gambian radiographer. He married Essi Matilda Forster (née Christian, who was the first female Gold Coast native to become a lawyer) on 17 December 1944. Together, they had three children: one daughter and two sons. Forster's hobbies were walking, and reading.
