= Commission on Human Rights and Administrative Justice =

Ghanaian independent government organization

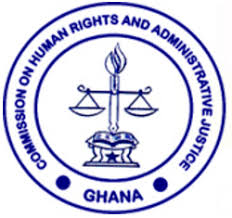

Agency overview
- Formed: 1993
- Jurisdiction: Government of Ghana
- Headquarters: Old Parliament House, High Street, Accra Ghana
- Agency executives: Joseph Whittal, Commissioner; Richard Quayson, Deputy Commissioner; Mercy Larbi, 2nd Deputy Commissioner
- Website: chraj.gov.gh

The Commission on Human Rights and Administrative Justice (CHRAJ) is an independent governmental organization charged with safeguarding of human rights and investigating human rights abuses in Ghana. It was established in 1993 by Act 456 of the Parliament of Ghana as directed by Article 216 of the 1992 Ghana constitution.

== Creation and composition ==
The 1992 Ghana Constitution directs the legislature to establish a commission with mandate to be The National Human Rights Institution of Ghana, the Ombudsman of Ghana and an Anti-Corruption Agency and Ethics Office for the Public Service of Ghana. The commission was duly established in 1993 with the passage of the CHRAJ Act, Act 456.

The commission is made up of a commissioner and two deputy commissioners, who are appointed by the President of Ghana under Article 70 of the Ghanaian constitution. The commissioner must be qualified to be a Justice of the Appeal Court and the deputies must be eligible to be justices of the High Court.

The first commissioner was Emile Short who retired in 2010, in 2004 he took an indefinite leave to serve as a Justice at the United Nations International Criminal Tribunal for Rwanda, his deputy Anna Bossman served as the acting commissioner in his absence. He resume his post in 2009 and retired in 2010. Madam Lauretta Lamptey succeed him . In July 2012, Joseph Akanjoluer Whittal was sworn in by President John Atta Mills as a deputy commissioner. Joseph Whittal was appointed by President Mahama to replace Lauretta Lamptey in 2016.

The commission serves as an ombudsman receiving and dealing with complaints about the proper functioning of public institutions and to provide redress. It appears it can do same for private entities due to the way Article 218 (c) is written.

== Key developments ==
In September 2022, the Commission on Human Rights and Administrative Justice (CHRAJ) called for the inclusion of conflict of interests screening as a requirement in the appointment and assignment of public officials as part of efforts to clamp down on corruption. Commissioner of CHRAJ, Joseph Whittal argued that conflict of interest screening will give public officials the opportunity to declare their interests before accepting an appointment.

On 16 July 2025, CHRAJ launched Ghana's national action plan to enhance access to effective remedies for victims of business-related human rights abuses and violations. Called the Ghana National Action Plan on Business and Human Rights (NAP-BHR) (2025-2029), it was developed by CHRAJ, the Office of the Attorney General and the Ministry of Justice. The five-year plan is to ensure that the state protects human rights while businesses protect these rights as well. It is also aimed at promoting human rights compliance and accountability by business actors, while ensuring the respect of vulnerable and marginalised individual groups in business operations.

== Key cases ==
In December 2017, CHRAJ cleared the Minister of Finance, Ken Ofori-Atta, of allegations of conflict of interest in the issuance of some bonds after a petition by Mr. Yaw Brogya Genfi.

In 2025, CHRAJ investigated and found former Commissioner-General of the Ghana Revenue Authority (GRA), Rev. Amisshaddai Owusu-Amoah, culpable of procurement breaches that led to a financial loss of about GHS 9 million to the state. The probe by CHRAJ found that the former GRA Commissioner awarded a contract under what it described as "dubious circumstances" to three companies for the supply of vehicles and logistics to the GRA. As a result, the Commission barred the former GRA boss from holding any public office for five years in its recommendations.

== List of commissioners ==
List of commissioners
Commissioner	Date	Appointed	Deputies	
Emile Short	(1993 — 2010)	Jerry John Rawlings	Anna Bossman	Retired
Anna Bossman	(2004 — 2009)	John Kufour		resigned
Lauretta Lamptey	(2011 — 2015	John Evans Atta Mills	Joseph Whittal	Dismissed
Joseph Whittal	(2016 -	John Dramani Mahama	Richard Quayson / Mercy Larbi	

== See also ==
- Human rights commission
- Economic and Organized Crime Unit
