= Emile Short =

Ghanaian judge (born 1943)

Emile Francis Short

1st Commissioner for Human Rights and Administrative Justice
- In office 1993 – December 2010
- President: Jerry Rawlings
- Deputy: Anna Bossman
- Succeeded by: Lauretta Lamptey

Judge of the International Criminal Tribunal for Rwanda
- In office 23 March 2004 – 30 September 2011

Personal details
- Born: February 6, 1943 (age 83) Cape Coast
- Spouse: Gladys Quarshie Short
- Children: Maxine Beauport Short, Emil Short, Jennifer Mograbi Short
- Education: St. Augustine's College (Cape Coast), University of London, London school of Economics and Political Science
- Profession: Judge, Academic

Emile Francis Short is a Ghanaian judge and academic and the first Commissioner on Human Rights and Administrative Justice in Ghana.

== Early life and education ==
Short was born on February 6, 1943, in Cape Coast, Gold Coast to Joseph Short, a Sierra Leonean lawyer and Wilhelmina Short, née Smith, a Fante who was of partial Sierra Leonean descent through her paternal grandfather, Francis Smith (judge), a justice of the Supreme Court of the Gold Coast. He started is early education at the Jubilee School, Cape Coast. At age 12, he was enrolled to St. Augustine's College in Cape Coast for his O and A Level certificates. Upon completion of his secondary education, short furthered to the University of London where he studied LLB degree in law. He was called to the Bar in England in 1966 after studying for Barrister-at-Law certificate at Lincoln's Inn. He obtained a Master's degree in Law (LL. M.) from the London School of Economics and Political Science. He was called to Ghana Bar in 1973, after studying Orientation course in customary law at the Ghana School of Law. He also hold an honorary doctorate from Northwestern University in Illinois.

== Career ==
Short started his legal career in Sierra Leon, where he was appointed as a state attorney in 1968 after teaching briefly at Middlesex Polytechnic in London, United Kingdom. He started his legal practice in Ghana in 1974 and headed Max-Idan Chambers in Cape Coast. He lectured at the University of Cape Coast in the Central Region of Ghana and He also serve as a consultant for the United Nations Development Programme (UNDP), the Commonwealth Secretariat in London, and the Carter Center in the United States.

He was appointed the Commissioner for Human Rights and Administrative Justice in Ghana at the beginning of the Fourth Republic in 1993 by President Jerry Rawlings.

In 2004, he took indefinite leave from his position at CHRAJ to be the ad litem judge with the United Nations International Criminal Tribunal for Rwanda at Arusha in Tanzania after he had been elected to that position by the United Nations General Assembly. This was during the prosecution for war crimes in Rwanda. He returned to his position at CHRAJ in August 2009. He retired in December 2010.

Short has also advised on international law, human rights and administrative justice on various occasions.

== Selected awards ==
Political offices
New title	Commissioner for Human Rights and Administrative Justice; 1993 — 2010	Succeeded by Lauretta Lamptey
