= Olabisi Awoonor-Renner =

Nigerian activist and lawyer (1923–1975)

- Born: Olabisi Modupe Alakija; 2 May 1923; Lagos, Nigeria
- Died: 11 September 1975 (aged 52); Lagos, Nigeria
- Burial place: Ikoyi Cemetery, Lagos
- Education: Cheltenham Ladies' College; Middle Temple
- Occupation: Lawyer
- Spouse: Kweku Bankole Awoonor-Renner

Olabisi Awoonor-Renner (2 May 1923 – 11 September 1975; née Alakija) was a Nigerian lawyer and political activist.

== Early life and education ==
Awoonor-Renner was born in Lagos, Nigeria, on 2 May 1923, into a family of lawyers and nationalists, two years after her parents had a high-society wedding in Lagos in 1921.

Her father, Olayimika Alakija, qualified as a barrister in 1913. In 1938, he was elected to the Nigerian legislative council. Her uncle Adeyemo Alakija also served in the legislative council.

At the age of eight, Awoonor-Renner, along with her younger brother, was sent to live in Brighton, England, where she attended St. Mary's Hall, a private school for girls. She graduated from the school in 1939 and proceeded to Cheltenham Ladies' College.

Awoonor-Renner was admitted to Middle Temple and qualified as a barrister in October 1943, an achievement considered so remarkable, presumably because of her nationality, gender and age, that it was reported as far away as the United States, where it appeared on the front page of the Atlanta Daily World under the headline "African Amazes Legal Circles". Awoonor-Renner was the second Nigerian woman to qualify as a barrister, the first being Stella Thomas.

== Personal life ==
Ancestry records show that Olabisi Alakija married Kweku Bankole Awoonor-Renner in April 1944, when she was just under 21 years old. Her husband was 45. The couple lived at 63 Priory Road in what was probably a house of multiple occupancy. Obafemi Awolowo, a Nigerian nationalist and the first Premier of the Western Region of Nigeria, was also registered as living at the same address in 1946.

== Career and political activism ==
Along with her husband, Awoonor-Renner was active in Pan-African politics. They were active in the West African Students' Union and both attended the fifth Pan African Congress (5th PAC), which took place in Manchester, England, in October 1945. Soon after the 5th PAC concluded, the West African National Secretariat (WANS) was founded. Awoonor-Renner became a joint treasurer. Her husband was elected president, I.T.A. Wallace-Johnson chairman and Kwame Nkrumah secretary-general.

Awoonor-Renner and her husband relocated to the Gold Coast (Ghana) with their two young sons in August 1948. On 22 September 1948, she enrolled as a barrister with The Gold Coast Bar.

Awoonor-Renner and her husband continued with political activism following their relocation to the Gold Coast. Both became involved in the Convention People's Party (CPP) and were instrumental in the Positive Action campaign which took place in January 1950. When the colonial administration arrested key people involved in Positive Action, Awoonor-Renner acted as counsel, preparing the defence case and representing several of those arrested, including her husband. Her husband and others, including Nkrumah, were convicted in February 1950 and sentenced to 12 months imprisonment for inciting people to participate in Positive Action.

Shortly after acting as defence counsel for the accused in the Positive Action case and despite her husband's imprisonment, Awoonor-Renner stood as a CPP candidate in the Accra municipal elections. When the results were announced on 1 April 1950, the CPP swept the board, winning all seats with Awoonor-Renner gaining the most votes of any candidate, including her CPP running mates.

Awoonor-Renner was just 27 years old and the mother of two young sons when she won the election. During her tenure, Awoonor-Renner worked with her fellow CPP councillors to collectivise local government, introducing advisory committees made up of local people to ensure that councillors heard the voices of their constituents and that actions were continually guided by local needs. For instance, Awoonor-Renner worked with fellow councillors to set up a nursery for the children of market women.

Awoonor-Renner represented the people of Accra on the town council for two years before resigning in August 1952. By this time, her husband had parted ways with the CPP. He later joined the Muslim Association Party. It is reported that in December 1950 Convention People's Party CPP activists attacked and severely injured Olabisi Awoonor-Renner.

== Later life ==
Bankole-Renner relocated to Lagos, Nigeria sometime between 1952 and 1954, living in her late father's house with her four sons, who travelled with her from Accra. She gave birth to a daughter following her move to Nigeria, who was named Funmilayo, possibly after Funmilayo Ransome-Kuti, the renowned Nigeria activist and mother of Fela Kuti. After settling in Nigeria Bankole-Renner opened a law practice.

Bankole-Renner died on 11 September 1975, five years after her husband Bankole Awoonor-Renner died in Accra in 1970. She was just 52 years old. She was buried next to her father in Ikoyi cemetery, Lagos Island.
