= Ammishaddai Owusu-Amoah =

Former Commissioner General of Ghana Revenue Authority

Commissioner General - Ghana Revenue Authority
- President: Nana Akuffo-Addo
- Succeeded by: Ms. Julia Essiam

Personal details
- Born: Ghana
- Occupation: Financial Management Professional

Ammishaddai Owusu-Amoah (born October 10, 1961) is a Ghanaian financial management professional. He was also the former Commissioner General of the Ghana Revenue Authority.

== Early life and education ==
Ammisshaddai attended the Kwame Nkrumah University of Science and Technology and was awarded a Bachelor of Arts degree in Economics & Sociology. In 2001 he was awarded a Master's in Business Administration (MBA) – Finance from the Henley Management College in the United Kingdom. In November 2021 he was awarded a Master of Science (MSc) Applied Leadership Research at the Swiss Business School and later that a Doctorate in Business Leadership (DBL) Swiss Business School.

== Career ==
Ammishaddai started his career in 1990 as an Assistant Statistian at the Ghana Statistical Service. In June 2019 he joined the Ghana Revenue Authority as a Commissioner, Domestic Tax Revenue and later rose to become the Commissioner-General.
