= Bankole Awoonor-Renner =

Ghanaian politician, journalist and Pan-Africanist (1898–1970)

Bankole Awoonor Renner
- Born: 6 June 1898; Elmina, British Gold Coast
- Died: 27 May 1970 (aged 71)
- Education: Carnegie Institute of Technology; Communist University of the Toilers of the East; Institute of Journalists
- Occupations: Journalist, politician
- Father: Peter Awoonor-Renner

Kweku Bankole Awoonor-Renner (6 June 1898 – 27 May 1970) was a Ghanaian politician, journalist, anti-colonialist and Pan-Africanist. In 1921, Awoonor-Renner travelled to the United States (US) to study journalism at Carnegie Institute of Technology. While studying in the US, Awoonor-Renner joined the CPUSA.

== Early life ==
Bankole Awoonor-Renner was born on 6 June 1898 in Elmina in the Gold Coast, a British colony in West Africa. His father Peter Awoonor-Renner was a lawyer and first leader of the Gold Coast bar. Awoonor-Renner attended boarding school in Cape Coast.

== Years abroad ==
In 1921, Awoonor-Renner travelled to the US to study journalism at Carnegie Institute of Technology. While studying in the US, he joined the CPUSA. In 1925, Awoonor-Renner travelled from the US to the Soviet Union along with nine other black men to study at the Communist University of the Toilers of the East (KUTV). He is considered to be the first Black African to study in the Soviet Union. In addition to ideological formation, he probably also received military training in the Red Army. In 1927, he left the Soviet Union for Great Britain, where he furthered his studies in journalism at the Institute of Journalists in London, becoming the first African to graduate from the Institute.

== Return to the Gold Coast ==
On his return to the Gold Coast, Awoonor-Renner became editor of the Gold Coast Leader newspaper.

In 1934, Awoonor-Renner and several others, including Ellis Brown, I. T. A. Wallace-Johnson and Robert Benjamin Wuta-Ofei, founded the West African Youth League (WAYL) in the Gold Coast. Awoonor-Renner was elected President of the WAYL.

He converted to Islam in 1942, winning a seat on the Accra city council as part of the Moslem Party.

In 1945, he attended the fifth Pan-African Congress, in Manchester, representing the Friends of African Freedom Society.

Initially a colleague of Kwame Nkrumah, Awoonor-Renner helped Ghana's first president found the Convention People's Party (CPP), being imprisoned alongside Nkrumah in 1950. Awoonor-Renner broke with Nkrumah around 1952 as the latter (influenced by his aide George Padmore) moved towards anti-communism and partial conciliation with the British government; he then established the Muslim Association Party.

== Personal life ==
Awoonor-Renner met his wife Olabisi Awoonor-Renner (nee Alakija) in London. They married in April 1944 and had five children together: four sons and one daughter.

== Later life ==
Following the prohibition of political pluralism in the 1960s, Awoonor-Renner retired from politics, dying in poverty.
