= Londoner =

Londoner may refer to:

- Londoner, a person from or living in London, the capital of England and the UK
- Londoner, a person from or living in London, Ontario, Canada
- The Londoner Macao, a casino resort on the Cotai Strip, Macau
- The Londoners (TV series), a Polish TV drama series set in London
- Londoner v. City and County of Denver, an important case in United States administrative law

== See also ==
- Londoni, a term for British Bangladeshis
