= William Broughton Davies =

Sierra Leonean doctor

William Broughton Davies (c. 1831–1906) was a Sierra Leonean Creole medical doctor who served in the British Colonial Army from 1860 to 1881. Davies was the first West African to qualify as a medical doctor in 1859.

== Background ==
Davies was born in about 1831 in the Liberated African village of Waterloo, Sierra Leone. His parents had been 'Aku' or Yoruba recaptives who had been rescued from slavery and had been deposited in Freetown, Sierra Leone. Davies was sent by his parents to the CMS Grammar School to train and eventually receive orders as a priest. Instead Davies, alongside Africanus Horton and Samuel Campbell, received a scholarship to study medicine in England. Davies and his companions eventually enrolled at King's College London in 1859. Because of the climate, Davies fell ill though eventually recovered. His compatriot, Samuel Campbell died after being ill. Davies married Mary Smith, half sister of Adelaide Casely-Hayford (daughter of William Smith, Jr.).
