= Anna Bossman =

Ghanaian human rights advocate

Amb. Anna Bossman

Ambassador to France, Portugal
- In office July 2017 – December 2024
- President: Nana Akuffo-Addo
- Succeeded by: Mavis Ama Frimpong

Personal details
- Born: 1 December 1957 (age 68) Kumasi, Ghana
- Children: 1
- Education: Holy Child High School, Ghana; Achimota School; University of Ghana; Ghana School of Law
- Occupation: Human right advocate

Anna Bossman (born 1 December 1957) is a Ghanaian human rights advocate. She was formerly the director for the Integrity and Anti-Corruption Department of the African Development Bank (AfDB). In 2017, she was appointed Ghana's ambassador to France under the leadership of Nana Akuffo Addo.

== Education ==
She was born in Kumasi, Ghana, to Dr Jonathan Emmanuel Bossman, a former Ghanaian representative to the United Nations in Geneva, and Alice Decker. Anna Bossman attended Holy Child School in Cape Coast, going on to Achimota School for her high school education. She graduated from the University of Ghana, Legon with a Law and Political Science degree and completed the Ghana School of Law in 1980, being called to the Ghana Bar that same year.

== Career ==
After serving as an Assistant State Attorney in Ghana's Ministry of Justice, Bossman went into private practice, and over the subsequent 25 years would pursue a career in the oil and gas industry and energy sector, working with major international companies including Tenneco in Gabon (where she was the first woman secretary-general of the Gabonese Union of Petroleum Companies), Congo, Côte d'Ivoire, Angola, as well as in Ghana, where in 1996 she founded Bossman Consultancy Limited to provide support to power utilities and energy sectors, international institutions and donor agencies as well as private companies and business investors.

She was Deputy Commissioner of Ghana's Commission on Human Rights and Administrative Justice (CHRAJ) from 2002 to 2010, where she was appointed Acting Commissioner.

In July 2011, she was employed by the African Development Bank Group as Director of the Integrity and Anti-Corruption Department, in charge of investigating fraud, corruption and other malpractices.

=== Diplomatic career ===
In June 2017, she was appointed Ghana's ambassador to France, and presented her letters of credence to French President Emmanuel Macron on 13 October 2017. She was also Ghana's ambassador to Portugal and her country's permanent representative to UNESCO.

== Personal life ==
She was formerly married to Burkina Faso's former prime ministerial candidate, Pierre-Claver Damiba; they had a daughter.

== Selected awards ==
2008 – Ghana Women's achievers Award for excellence in Human Rights and the Law (Ghana National Honorary Awards of Fame)
