= Arthur Osman Farquhar Stuart =

Sierra Leonean doctor (1927–2002)

Arthur Osman Stuart
- Arthur O. Stuart
- Born: Arthur Osman Stuart; 28 December 1927; Freetown, Sierra Leone
- Died: 20 January 2002 (aged 74); Freetown, Sierra Leone
- Education: University of Liverpool
- Occupations: Medical doctor, physician
- Relatives: William Farquhar Conton (first cousin), Yema Lucilda Hunter (niece)

Arthur Osman Farquhar Stuart (1927–2002) was a Sierra Leonean medical doctor who was popularly referred to as the 'People's Doctor.'

== Early life ==
Arthur Stuart was born in Freetown, Sierra Leone to Sierra Leonean parents, Arthur MacCarthy Stuart, a civil servant of Bahamian descent and Amy Hilda Stuart, née Farquhar of Barbadian descent.

== Education ==
Stuart was educated at secondary schools and subsequently studied medicine at the Liverpool School of Tropical Medicine.

== Career ==
Stuart was the first Sierra Leonean medical doctor to work at Hill Station, Sierra Leone and was subsequently a consultant physician at Connaught Hospital.

== Death ==
Stuart died following a stroke in 2002.
