= Zion Methodist Church, Wilberforce Street =

Church in Freetown, Sierra Leone

Coordinates: 8.483692°N 13.234997°W

Zion Methodist Church, Wilberforce Street is a historic Settler church established by the Nova Scotian Settlers in 1792 and the present building was constructed in the early to middle of the nineteenth century.

== History ==
Zion Methodist Church, Wilberforce Street is a historical Methodist church based in Freetown, Sierra Leone which was founded by the original African American founders of the Colony of Sierra Leone.

== Sources ==
- Fyfe, Christopher, A History of Sierra Leone, (Britain: Oxford University, 1962).
