= Gladys Casely-Hayford =

Gold Coast-born Sierra Leonean writer (1904–1950)

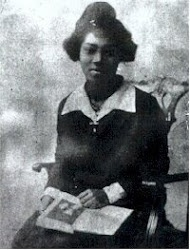
- Born: Gladys May Casely-Hayford; 11 May 1904; Axim, Gold Coast
- Died: October 1950 (aged 46); Freetown, British Sierra Leone
- Other name: Aquah Laluah
- Occupations: Educator; writer
- Spouse: Arthur Hunter
- Children: Kobina Hunter
- Parent(s): Adelaide Casely-Hayford; J. E. Casely Hayford

Gladys May Casely-Hayford alias Aquah Laluah (11 May 1904 – October 1950) was a Gold Coast-born Sierra Leonean writer.

== Early life and career ==
Gladys was born into the Casely-Hayford family of Axim, Gold Coast, on 11 May 1904. As a child, known then as Aquah LaLuah, she was a voracious reader, devouring Charles Kingsley's Heroes at the age of seven. She could sing, dance, and even write poetry at an early age. Due to her upbringing she could speak fluent English, Creole, and Fante (the language of her father). She had her primary and secondary school education in Gold Coast but for medical reasons was taken to England, and was then educated in Europe, including at Penrhos College, Colwyn Bay, in Wales, then travelled with a Berlin jazz band as a dancer. She travelled in the US as well. When she started having breakdowns in 1932 she really had to go home. Back home in Africa, she taught at the Girls' Vocational School in Freetown, Sierra Leone, run by her mother, Adelaide Casely-Hayford, specializing in African folklore and literature.

== Later life and work ==
Acquah Laluah married Arthur Hunter around 1936, and their son Kobina was born in 1940. Very aware of her African background, she celebrated her blackness in poems including "Rejoice" and "Nativity". Although not much of her poetry was published during her lifetime, many of her poems were anthologized in the 1960s. Poems such as "Nativity" (1927), "The Serving Girl" (1941) and "Creation" (1926), have been widely anthologized; writers from the Harlem Renaissance loved her work.

== Death ==
Gladys May Casely-Hayford lived in Freetown, Sierra Leone, for much of her life. She moved to Accra, where her father's family lived, and where she died in 1950 of blackwater fever.

== Works ==
- Take'Um So, 1948 (poetry)
