= Frances Claudia Wright =

Sierra Leonean lawyer

Frances Claudia Wright OBE
- Frances Claudia Wright
- Born: Frances Claudia Wright; 5 March 1919; Freetown, British Sierra Leone
- Died: 2 April 2010 (aged 91); South Kensington, London
- Other name: West Africa's Portia
- Education: Bedford Girls' Modern School, Gray's Inn
- Occupation: Barrister
- Writing career
- Language: English

Frances Claudia Wright, OBE (5 March 1919 – 2 April 2010), was a prominent Sierra Leonean lawyer during the 20th century. Known as "West Africa's Portia", in 1941 Wright was the first Sierra Leonean woman to be called to the Bar in Great Britain and to practise law in Sierra Leone.

== Early life ==
Frances Claudia Wright was born in Freetown, British Sierra Leone, to Sierra Leone Creole parents, Claude and Eva Wright. Her father Claude and his brother Ernest Jenner were born in England to Sophie Slocombe, an English woman, and the Sierra Leone Creole man Claudius Ernest Wright, then a student. He later became a lawyer who served on the Legislative Council of Sierra Leone and as mayor of Freetown. Like his father, Claude studied law. He was called to the Bar at the age of 21, at the top of his class. He went to Sierra Leone from England in search of his father, finding that he had died and left Claude's half siblings in debt. Deciding to settle in the Creole society of Freetown, Wright set up a practice and revived his father's Gloucester Street premises, and also served on the Legislative Council.

Frances's mother was Eva Smith, who was the outside daughter of Francis Smith, the second Sierra Leonean to qualify as a lawyer. Francis Smith was the brother of Claudius Wright's mother-in-law and was the half-brother of Adelaide Casely-Hayford. Smith had served as puisne judge on the Gold Coast after attending QEGS in Wakefield, England.

To satisfy her father's aspirations for a child to succeed him as lawyer, Frances Wright studied at Bedford Girls' Modern School (now Dame Alice Harpur School), in England and was called to the Bar from Gray's Inn on 17 November 1941, during the Second World War. In 1943, she sailed for Sierra Leone on the ship SS California, but when this was sunk off North Africa she lost all of her possessions and had to be rescued by HMCS Iroquois.

== Career ==
Wright made her way to Sierra Leone and joined her father's practice. She proved a force in the judiciary of Sierra Leone, once confronting Andrew Juxon-Smith with the expectation that she would be arrested. She served as the President of the Bar Association. She is creditted with being the first person from Sierra Leone to set up a practice that only employs women lawyers.

Wright never married. In 1991 she left the country at the outbreak of the Sierra Leone Civil War and settled in South Kensington in England. Her father's practice in Freetown was destroyed in the war.

Frances Wright died in England on 2 April 2010. After she died her family discovered that she had been given an OBE but she had never mentioned it.

== Legacy and honours ==
- Wright was awarded an OBE by the Queen of the United Kingdom for legal services. AdvocAid a Sierra Leone Charity announced that it was created its first Frances Claudia Wright Scholar in 2023.

== See also ==
- First women lawyers around the world
