= George Green Spilsbury =

- Born: 30 July 1786; London, England
- Died: 6 July 1857 (aged 70); Fort William, Bengal, British India
- Occupation: Physician
- Employer: East India Company
- Known for: Medical service in India; studies of natural history and fossils
- Medical career
- Profession: Physician, surgeon
- Notable works: Studies in medicine, natural history, geology and antiquities

George Green Spilsbury (30 July 1786 – 6 July 1857) was a British physician in the Bengal Medical Service.

During his service in India, he also conducted studies in the local geology, paleontology, and ethnography. He has been claimed to be the inventor of the "thermantidote", a wet cloth and blower attached to the window to cool the home in summer.

== Early life ==
Spilsbury was born in London, the son of patent medicine manufacturer Francis and Dorothy Spilsbury. Francis Spilsbury was famous for his "Spilsbury’s Antiscorbutic Drops".

== Medical career ==
He was posted to Sierra Leone as a civil surgeon shortly after studying medicine. After fifteen month he moved back to England and joined as an assistant surgeon in Bengal with the East India Company. Commissioned on 17 August 1811 he reached Calcutta aboard the Baring.

He served in the Nepal war (1814-16) and received a medal. He also served in the Siege of Hathras (1817-18) under the Marquis of Hastings.

He went to Pachmarhi in 1819 after which he became a civil surgeon at Jabalpur. In 1823 he became surgeon and in 1844 superintending surgeon in Saugor and later Kanpur. In 1836 he made a Hindustani translation of the London pharmacopoeia. In 1853 he was a member of the Medical Board.

== Scientific and literary work ==
He was interested in linguistics, medicine, natural history and the antiquities, writing extensively in the Journal of the Asiatic Society of Bengal.

In the Narmada valley he examined fossils and was the first to find dinosaur (Titanosaurus) vertebrae along with W. H. Sleeman. He also wrote on small pox vaccine and studied cholera outbreaks. He noted that in 1817 nearly 10,000 soldiers of the East India Company died from cholera.

== Personal life ==
Spilsbury had a relationship with Elizabeth 'Betsy' Fowler, a Jamaican Maroon woman and had at least one son, Joseph Green Spilsbury (1810-1856). His great-granddaughter was Adelaide Casely-Hayford, a feminist writer and educationalist.

The portrait of George Green Spilsbury was commissioned by the Asiatic Society of Kolkata and remains extant in the archives of the society.

== Death ==
He died of fever at Fort William, Bengal.
