= Raymond Sarif Easmon =

Sierra Leonean writer and physician (1913–1997)

- Born: 15 January 1913; Freetown, British Sierra Leone
- Died: 2 May 1997 (aged 84)
- Education: Prince of Wales Secondary School; Newcastle University, University of Liverpool
- Occupations: Physician; playwright
- Spouse: Esther Campbell Easmon
- Relatives: List: Albert Whiggs Easmon (father); Bertha Yvonne Conton (sister); Amy Manto Bondfield Wellesley-Cole, née Hotobah-During (sister); John Farrell Easmon (paternal uncle); Charles Odamtten Easmon (paternal nephew),♧; Macormack Charles Farrell Easmon (paternal cousin)
- Writing career
- Language: English

Raymond Sarif Easmon (15 January 1913 – 2 May 1997) was a prominent Sierra Leonean doctor known for his acclaimed literary work and political agitation.

== Background and early life ==
Raymond Sarif Easmon was born on 15 January 1913 in Freetown, British Sierra Leone, to the Easmon family, a prominent Creole medical family of African-American descent. Easmon's father Albert Whiggs Easmon and uncle, John Farrell Easmon, had qualified as doctors in the 19th century. Easmon's mother, Hannah Maillat (c. 1890–c. 1950), was a seamstress of French and Susu descent and Easmon was a sibling of Manto Noah, née Easmon (born 1911), a well-known Sierra Leonean botanist, also Nannette Sudie Easmon who married, Michael Benjamin Jones, Bertha Yvonne Thompson, who married William Conton and Amy Manto Bondfield Hotobah-During (1932–1995), who married Robert Wellesley-Cole.

R. Sarif Easmon was educated at Prince of Wales School, Freetown, and subsequently in England at the University of Durham, where he had a brilliant academic career and won awards in biology and anatomy and qualified as a doctor at the age of 23, and at the University of Liverpool (Diploma in Tropical Medicine). He arrived back in Sierra Leone in 1937.

== Political agitation ==
Easmon became politically active during the regime of President Siaka Stevens. Easmon criticized the rampant political corruption that occurred during the period and in 1970 was arrested and detained (1970–71) for his opposition to the government.

== Writing ==
Easmon's play Dear Parent and Ogre, first produced by Wole Soyinka in Lagos in 1961, won the Encounter Magazine prize. His second play, The New Patriots (1965), was performed in several West African countries. In the words of Simon Gikandi: "Easmon's plays are semi-comical commentaries on politics and culture in a community undergoing the birth throes of independence and corruption in the institutions of government." Easmon also wrote a novel called The Burnt-Out Marriage (1967), as well as short stories that were collected in The Feud and Other Stories (1981).

== Personal life ==
Dr. Easmon married Esther Campbell, the daughter of William Campbell, a teacher, and the granddaughter of Dr. William Frederick Campbell (1858–1926), a Sierra Leonean physician. The Easmons had six children.

== Published works ==
- Dear Parent and Ogre (Oxford University Press, Three Crowns Books, 1964), play
- The New Patriots: a play in three acts (London, 1965), play
- The Burnt-Out Marriage (1967), novel
- The Feud and Other Stories (1981)

== Sources ==
- C. P. Foray and Magbaily Fyle, Historical Dictionary of Sierra Leone, 2005.
- Adell Patton, Physicians, Colonial Racism, and Diaspora in West Africa, University Press of Florida, 1996.
