= Francis Smith (judge) =

Sierra Leonean Puisne Judge (1847-1912)

- Born: 30 June 1847; Freetown, British Sierra Leone
- Died: 25 November 1912 (aged 65); London, England, United Kingdom of Great Britain and Ireland
- Other name: Frans Smith
- Education: Queen Elizabeth Grammar School, Wakefield, Middle Temple
- Occupation: Puisne Judge
- Writing career
- Language: English

Francis Smith (30 June 1847 – 25 November 1912) was a Sierra Leonean Puisne Judge in the Gold Coast. He was the second Sierra Leonean to qualify as a barrister after he passed the bar at Middle Temple on 26 January 1871.

== Early life and background ==
Francis Smith was born in 1847 to William Smith Jr., registrar of the Mixed Commissary Court in Freetown, Sierra Leone, and his wife, Charlotte Smith (née Macaulay). William Smith was born in Cape Coast in the Gold Coast and was the son of a Fante princess and Judge William Smith Sr (1795–1875), who served as head of the Mixed Commissary Church in Freetown. Charlotte Macaulay was born to Mary Harding, a Jamaican Maroon mother, and Kenneth Macaulay, a distant relation of Lord Macaulay and second cousin to Zachary Macaulay.

== Education ==
Smith was educated at Queen Elizabeth Grammar School, Wakefield in Yorkshire. After completing his secondary education, he entered Middle Temple on 10 January 1868 and was called to the bar in 1871.

== Judicial career ==
Smith rose rapidly through the judicial ranks and was appointed Chief Magistrate of The Gambia in 1879. He was appointed a Puisne Judge of the Supreme Court of the Gold Coast Colony in 1887, and later considered for appointment as Chief Justice.

== Family and descendants ==
Smith was the younger brother of Dr. Robert Smith (1840–1885), who served as Assistant Colonial Surgeon in Sierra Leone. Smith was the maternal grandfather of Frances Wright through her mother, Eva Wright (née Smith), and his great-grandson and namesake is Emile Francis Short, the first justice on the Commission on Human Rights and Administrative Justice.

== Retirement and death ==
At the time of his retirement in 1907, Smith was the only African serving on a superior court, and another would not be named until the 1930s. He retired to England and died in London on 12 May 1912. His achievements were recognized in glowing tributes across West Africa.
