= John Farrell Easmon =

Sierra Leonean Creole doctor (1859–1900)

John Farrell Easmon MRCS, LM, LKQCP
- John Farrell Easmon (seated) and his brother Albert Whiggs Easmon
- Born: John Farrell Easmon; 30 June 1856; Freetown, Sierra Leone
- Died: 9 June 1900 (aged 43); Cape Coast, Ghana
- Other name: Johnnie or Johnie
- Education: CMS Grammar School, Freetown; University College London
- Occupation: Chief Medical Officer
- Spouse: Annette Kathleen Smith Easmon
- Children: Two
- Relatives: Macormack Charles Farrell Easmon (son); Charles Odamtten Easmon (grandson)
- Writing career
- Language: English

John Farrell Easmon, MRCS, LM, LKQCP, MD, CMO (30 June 1856 – 9 June 1900), was a prominent Sierra Leonean Creole medical doctor in the British Gold Coast who served as Chief Medical Officer during the 1890s. Easmon was the only West African to be promoted to Chief Medical Officer and he served in this role with distinction during the last decade of the 19th century. Easmon was a botanist and a noted expert on the study and treatment of tropical diseases. In 1884, he wrote a pamphlet entitled The Nature and Treatment of Blackwater Fever, which noted for the first time the relationship between blackwater fever and malaria. Easmon coined the term "blackwater fever" in his pamphlet on the malarial disease.

== Background ==
A member of the prominent Easmon family medical dynasty, John Farrell Easmon (or "Johnnie") was born of "good Settler stock" in the Settler Town area of Freetown, Sierra Leone, on 30 June 1856 to Walter Richard Easmon (1824–1883) and his second wife Mary Ann MacCormac (1830–1865). On both his paternal and maternal lineages, John Easmon was a descendant of Freetown's Founding Families, the Nova Scotian settlers, who were African Americans originally from the United States. Easmon's paternal grandparents were William and Jane Easmon, who had arrived in Sierra Leone from the United States via Nova Scotia in 1792. John Easmon's mother, Mary Ann MacCormac was part Northern Irish and part Settler, the daughter of Hannah Cuthbert, a Settler woman of African-American descent originally from Savannah, Georgia, and John MacCormac, a successful Irish trader who was the uncle of Sir William MacCormac.

== Education ==
J. F. Easmon grew up on Little East Street and attended a Roman Catholic primary school at Howe Street, Freetown, before being enrolled alongside Isaac Easmon in the Church Missionary Society Grammar School in 1869. After serving as an apprentice to Dr. Robert Smith at the Colonial Hospital, in 1875 Easmon received his inheritance from the estate of his maternal grandfather and immediately registered at University College London in order to gain Membership of the Royal College of Surgeons (MRCS). While at University College London, Easmon won six medals (three gold medals and three silver medals), including the Liston Gold Medal for Clinical Surgery, and his academic achievements were lauded by newspapers in Sierra Leone. After graduating in 1879 after a distinguished academic career, Easmon gained the LM and LKQCP from the King and Queen's College of Physicians in Ireland (now the Royal College of Physicians of Ireland) and an M.D. with distinction from the Université libre de Bruxelles.

== Return to Sierra Leone ==
Easmon's distinguished academic career received attention from his uncle, Sir William MacCormac, who offered him a position as an assistant house surgeon. Easmon turned down the offer and returned to Freetown, where he opened a practice on No. 2 East Street in Settler Town, Sierra Leone. Easmon was known for wearing the "proper English medical attire" consisting of a silk top hat, frock coat, and striped trousers, which he also wore on his annual leave to England. Many elderly settlers sought his attention and perhaps due to the amount of attention he received, or to further his ambitions, Easmon moved to the Gold Coast in 1880. It was there that he would establish himself as an eminent West African doctor.

== Medical career in the Gold Coast ==
Easmon moved to the Gold Coast in 1880 and accepted a position as an Assistant Colonial Surgeon, in addition to opening a private practice in Accra. He was rotated between Keta, Accra, and also served in Lagos, Nigeria. His popularity in the Gold Coast increased among native and European residents and when he applied as a colonial medical officer in Sierra Leone, Sir William Brandford Griffith, the governor of the Gold Coast, recommended to the colonial government that Easmon remain on the Gold Coast where he was needed.

== Career as Chief Medical Officer ==
Easmon served as Chief Medical Officer (CMO) before officially being appointed CMO of the Gold Coast in 1893. He served in this role until his resignation in 1897, following an investigation into whether he maintained a private practice and published articles in the Gold Coast press, in contravention of colonial regulations.

== Social activities ==
Easmon resided with his family in Victoriaborg, then the European residential district in Accra. He was an active and prominent freemason and was a member and one-time Master of the Victoria Lodge in Accra and the John Hervey Lodge in England. He was an active member of the Accra Jockey Club or Accra Turf Club and with his horse, "His Lordship", won the Governor's Cup on several occasions. Easmon also served as a medical officer in the Accra Volunteer Corps.

Easmon was a founder and keen worker of the Aburi Botanical Gardens and also donated samples to Kew Gardens.

== Family ==
In 1889, John Easmon married Annette Kathleen Smith (daughter of William Smith and the sister of Dr Robert Smith, Francis Smith, and Adelaide Casely-Hayford). The couple had two children: Macormack Charles Farrell Easmon and Kathleen Easmon Simango. Macormack Easmon was also a prominent Creole doctor. John Easmon's grandson in the Gold Coast, Charles Odamtten Easmon, became Chief Medical Officer in newly independent Ghana in 1964 and was Dean of the Medical School. John Easmon's half-brother Albert Whiggs Easmon was a successful Creole doctor whose son, Raymond Sarif Easmon, was a doctor and poet.

== Death ==
Easmon died of pneumonia on 9 June 1900, aged 43, and was buried in Cape Coast.

== Sources ==
- M. C. F. Easmon, "A Nova Scotian Family", Eminent Sierra Leoneans in the Nineteenth Century (1961).
- Adell Patton, Jr., "Dr. John Farrell Easmon: Medical Professionalism and Colonial Racism in the Gold Coast, 1856–1900", The International Journal of African Historical Studies, Vol. 22, No. 4 (1989), pp. 601–636.
- Adell Patton Jr., "The Easmon Episode", Physicians, Colonial Racism, and Diaspora in West Africa, pp. 93–122.
