= Albert Whiggs Easmon =

Sierra Leonean physician (1855–1923)

- Born: Albert Whiggs Easmon; 30 June 1855; Freetown, Sierra Leone
- Died: 21 May 1921 (aged 65); Freetown, Sierra Leone
- Education: Wesleyan Boy's High School; University of Edinburgh
- Occupation: Chief Medical Officer
- Writing career
- Language: English

Albert Whiggs Easmon (1865 – 21 May 1921) was a Sierra Leonean Creole medical doctor and the half-brother of Dr John Farrell Easmon. Easmon was among the first group of Sierra Leoneans to qualify as a medical doctor after getting a degree from Edinburgh University. He became the leading gynaecologist in Freetown, Sierra Leone and had an extensive private practice.

== Background and early life ==
Albert Whiggs Easmon was born to Walter Richard Easmon (1824-1883) and Mah Serah, a Susu from modern-day Guinea. Albert Easmon's father belonged to a prominent Nova Scotian Settler Easmon family of Little East Street, Freetown. Albert Whiggs Easmon was the younger half brother of Dr. John Farrell Easmon, who was promoted to the position of Chief Medical Officer of the Gold Coast.

== Education ==
Albert Whiggs Easmon enrolled in Edinburgh University to study medicine; he qualified in 1895, graduating with First Class Honours.

== Influenza epidemic ==
He was reportedly the only physician who did not contract influenza during the 1918–19 influenza epidemic in Freetown. According to his son Raymond S. Easmon: "Father had literally to doctor the whole city."

== Paralysis and death ==
Soon after the epidemic, Easmon had a stroke that paralysed the right side of his body, leaving him bedridden for two years until his death on 26 May 1923, at the age of 56.

== Family ==
Albert Whiggs Easmon had at least two children; Dr Raymond Sarif Easmon and Maserae Easmon.
