= Sierra Leone Grammar School =

Location
- Freetown; Sierra Leone; 8.493829°N 13.2673°W

Information
- School type: Secondary
- Motto: Διωκω (Greek: Dioko) (To Pursue)
- Established: 25 March 1845; 181 years ago
- Principal: Leonard Ken Davies

The Sierra Leone Grammar School was founded on 25 March 1845 in Freetown, Sierra Leone, by the Church Mission Society (CMS), and at first was called the CMS Grammar School. It was the first secondary educational institution for West Africans with a European curriculum. Many of the administrators and professionals of British West Africa were educated at the school.

== Foundation ==
The Church Mission Society founded Fourah Bay College in 1827 to provide training for African missionaries. As the academic standards of the college rose, the regular schools in the region were unable to produce students with sufficient education to be admitted to the college. The grammar school was founded to fill the gap. The CMS obtained a lease on a massive building with arches on all sides at Regent Square, Freetown, that until recently had been the house of the Governor. Opening on 25 March 1845, the CMS Grammar School was the first secondary education institution in Sierra Leone and the first in sub-Saharan Africa for Africans.

The CMS Grammar School offered a western-style curriculum that included Greek, Latin, Astronomy and Music. Other subjects were English, French, Bible Knowledge, Mathematics, Science, Geography, History, Recitation and Physical Education. The school began with 14 pupils from Fourah Bay College. At first the main purpose was to train people who would go on to become missionaries, so all pupils were expected to convert to Christianity.

== Colonial era ==
Six months after the school's foundation the number of pupils had risen to 30. Within a year, three of the pupils were able to read the New Testament in Greek and understood Euclid's Elements. They were sent on to Fourah Bay College. By 1847 the school had 45 pupils, of whom 18 were fee paying. The availability of boarding facilities at Regents Square made it practical for pupils to come from throughout the colony and from elsewhere in Africa. Many prominent West Africans were educated there.

The school soon expanded into training teachers, resulting in a great improvement in local standards of primary school education. It also began to provide general education for the emerging middle class in the Gambia, Gold Coast and Nigeria in addition to its original role of preparing students for entry to Fourah Bay College. Some students were subsidized by the CMS, but most paid fees. By 1850 the only contribution required of the CMS was the salary of the European principal. The CMS Grammar School in Lagos, Nigeria was founded in June 1859. It was modeled on the Freetown school, which by then had earned a high reputation. As the Freetown school grew and prospered, it was divided into a Preparatory and Upper school. As early as 1865 some of the more promising students were being sent to England for further training.

The report for the school for the year ending September 1851 said there were 53 pupils of whom four were the sons of native chiefs. The progress report indicates the curriculum: "The first class have read part of Nicholl's Help to the Bible, and have got up the natural, historical and political geography of Greece, and the account of Greek idolatory. They have advanced as far as mensuration of superfices, and are reading fractions in algebra and arithmetic. Some attention has been paid to land surveying. The historical, political and natural geography of Asia has been prepared for examination, and thirteen good maps have been drawn..."

In 1851 the school bought a six-acre farm and pupils were taught to raise cotton. In 1853 the Church Mission Society founded a model industrial school at Kissy, expecting graduates to go on to CMS Grammar School to be trained as teachers. These attempts at teaching practical skills were not successful and were abandoned. The students began to feel that such skills were for the working classes, and that knowledge of Latin and Greek was much more desirable. However, in the early 1860s some pupils were taught practical navigation on HMS Rattlesnake. The school acquired a printing press under the Rev. James Quaker and began to produce a twice-monthly journal The Ethiopia in 1871. Printing continued until 1942. The school started a marching band, which first performed in 1912. Sporadic attempts were again made to introduce practical training from the 1920s onward, including weaving and spinning, carpentry, bookbinding, cardboard modelling and the elementary arts, but without much success.

Despite limitations in the curriculum, the CMS Grammar School played an important role in training administrators, doctors and teachers throughout English-speaking West Africa in the first half of the 20th century.

== Post-independence ==
On the 27 April 1961 Sierra Leone became politically independent of Great Britain. The school moved to its present location at Murray Town in 1962. After being run by the Church Missionary Society for more than a century, the Government assumed greater responsibility for paying teachers' salaries and providing grants. The school regained independent status in September 2007 and is now sole property of the Anglican Diocese of Freetown. This gives the school more discretion over policies like tuition, recruitment and teachers' salaries, but also means the school no longer receives government subsidies.

== Principals ==
The first principal was Rev. Thomas Peyton (1845–52). He compared his students favourably to English students at a time when European racial prejudice against Africans was profound. The first African principal was James Quaker (1861–82), a former student of the Church Mission Society college in London. The Reverend Obadiah Moore was a graduate of the school who became principal after studying at Fourah Bay College and at Monkton Combe School near Bath in England, and holding other teaching positions. T.C. John, a Hausa, was taught at the Sierra Leone Grammar school and later became a Master, Vice-Principal and then in 1920 Principal of the school. In 1933 he was consecrated Assistant Bishop of the Niger. When he died on 26 January 1936 it was discovered that no provision had been made to pay a pension to his widow, but the church made no immediate move to rectify the problem.

A full list of principals:

- Rev. Thomas Peyton 1845–52
- Rev. John Milward 1852–59
- Rev. James Quaker 1861–82
- Rev.Canon Obadiah Moore 1882–1905
- Rev. George G. Garrett 1906–12
- Rev. Henry Dallimore 1914–20
- Bishop T. C. John 1920–33
- Bishop T. S. Johnson 1933–36
- Rev. P. Hycy Wilson 1937–47
- Rev. E. D. C. Clarke 1947–52
- Mr. Frank Wood 1952–64
- Very Revd. G. O. L. Palmer 1964–70
- Rev. H. G. B. Davies (Acting) 1970 - 1971
- Rev. V. J. Hasting-Spaine 1971–85
- Mr. Akiwande J. Lasite 1985–2018
- Rev. Kenneth Davies 2018–

== Alumni ==
- Captain James Pinson Labulo Davies Nigerian industrialist, mariner, philanthropist and politician
- Charles D.B. King, President of Liberia
- Frans Dove barrister, patron of sports and philanthropist
- Modjaben Dowuona, first Registrar of the University of Ghana; Minister for Education (1966–1969)
- Edward Francis Bani Forster, first Gambian Psychiatrist
- Thomas Horatio Jackson Nigerian Editor and Publisher of the Lagos Weekly Record
