= Adelaide Casely-Hayford =

Sierra Leonean educator (1868–1960)

Adelaide Casely-Hayford MBE
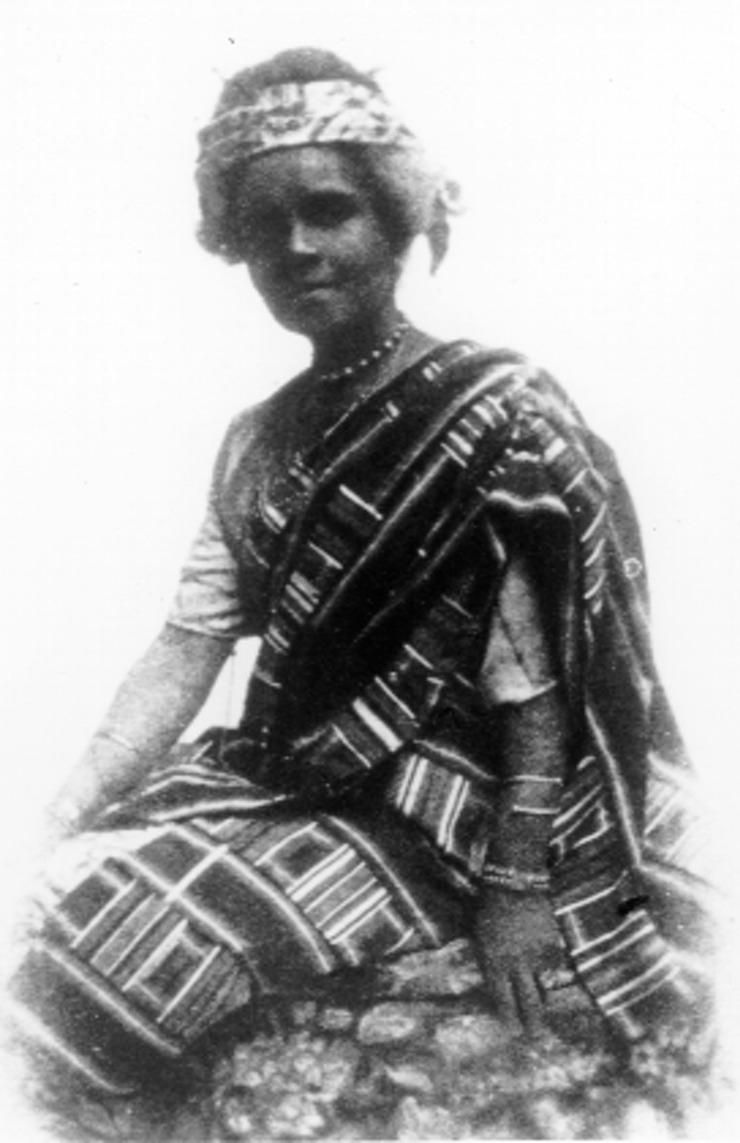
- Casely-Hayford in 1903
- Born: Adelaide Smith; 2 June 1868; Freetown, British Sierra Leone
- Died: 24 January 1960 (aged 91); Freetown, British Sierra Leone
- Occupations: Activist; educator; writer
- Spouse: J. E. Casely Hayford (m. 1903–1914)
- Children: Gladys
- Parents: William Smith Jr (father); Anne Spilsbury (mother)

Adelaide Casely-Hayford MBE (née Smith; 2 June 1868 – 24 January 1960), was a Sierra Leone Creole advocate, activist of cultural nationalism, teacher, fiction writer, and feminist. Her commitment to public service led her to improving the conditions of black women and men. She played an important role as an advocate of women's education in Sierra Leone to popularize Pan-Africanist and feminist politics in the early 1900s. In 1923, she founded a Girls' Vocational and Training School in Freetown to instil cultural and racial pride for Sierra Leoneans under colonial rule. The school lasted until 1940 and strongly emphasized the education of African women. She later went on to further her mission of feminism and cultural nationalism from the school by writing short stories and memoirs.

== Early life and education ==
Adelaide Smith was born on 2 June 1868 in Freetown, British Sierra Leone to an aristocratic Sierra Leone Creole family. She attended Jersey Ladies' College (now Jersey College for Girls). Her family tree consists of a white British judge grandfather, a Fanti grandmother from the Gold Coast, a Hausa trader great-grandmother, and a Maroon (half West Indian) grandfather. Her father, William Smith, came to Freetown at seventeen. Her mother, Anne Smith, née Spilsbury, was part English, part Maroon and part Mandingo and was a granddaughter of Dr George Green Spilsbury. She was the sixth of eight children. At Jersey Ladies' College, Casely Hayford and her sisters were the only black students, which taught her the power of kindness, as she wrote, "What did we know of racial prejudice, and an inferiority complex? Nothing! But we did know a lot about the milk of human kindness." Like many other Sierra Leone Creole women born into the elite society, she was deeply influenced by Victorian values and ideas of family and gender roles. Casely-Hayford also travelled, and while doing so became interested in Pan Africanist politics. At the age of 17, Smith went to Stuttgart, Germany, to study music at the Stuttgart Conservatory. She returned to England, where she and a sister opened a boarding home for African bachelors living in the country as students or workers. During a speech in 1905, she emphasized the importance African women could have in social and political development. Two years later, she returned to the Gold Coast (now Ghana). Her return was one of reluctance because of the attachment she and her sisters had formed to England. However, it was the wish of her father on his deathbed that motivated her to return. Upon returning she criticized raising black children overseas because of the lack of connection the children would have to their homeland.

== Marriage and family ==
Adelaide Smith returned to England with her sister, Mrs. Nettie Easmon. During her time in England, she received a letter from Casely Hayford (also known as Ekra-Agiman), and in September 1903, they were married in Fulham. Their marriage may have given her a deeper insight into African culture and influenced her transformation into a cultural nationalist. Their daughter Gladys Casely-Hayford, born in May 1904, later became a well-known Creole poet. In 1914, Adelaide and Hayford's marriage failed, after which she returned to Sierra Leone. The failure of their marriage was said to have come from their seeing little of each other, with Hayford practicing law and Adelaide being an educated woman. She later blamed her former husband for their continued financial problems.

== Professional career ==
Casely-Hayford is most known for her career as a teacher, advocate, and writer. Adelaide along with her future husband J. E. Casely Hayford established the African Association in 1897. The organization was important to the development of Pan-Africanism. It promoted the cultural and political advancement of African people. Upon returning to Sierra Leone in the early 1900s she began a career teaching music and taking on pupils. She was extremely critical of the education system in Africa. She believed that the African education system taught African children to hate themselves. She aimed to help shape the education system to be more focused on instilling racial and cultural pride. She went on to become the lady president for the Freetown branch of the United Negro Improvement Association (UNIA). It was in this capacity that she advocated for African feminism and Pan-Africanism. She went on a speaking tour in the United States to give insight into African societies and ultimately correct improper views of Africa by western society. Her work in America was not limited to her speaking tour. She became an associate to Nannie Burroughs by studying girl's schools in the U.S. for two years. She attended the fourth Pan-African conference in New York in 1927 which was organized by W.E.B. Du Bois. She became the only black female member of the colony's Education Board in 1924. With this position she continued to advocate for equal status of women's educations in comparison to that of men's education. She also pushed for schools to hire trained African teachers, to use African-produced textbooks, and dress in African traditional attire in schools.

== Mother-daughter collaboration ==
Adelaide Casely-Hayford and her daughter Gladys Casely-Hayford collaborated to open up the possibilities for African women. Adelaide opened the Girls Vocational School in Freetown in 1923. Her wish was for Gladys to return and take over the school but she initially resisted. While abroad Gladys spent much time sharpening her skills in poetry. After some years spent in England studying Gladys returned in 1926 to help her mother in caring for the school and teach.

Their relationship was not an easy one. One of the reasonings used to explain their unique relationship is their difference in childhood. Adelaide grew up primarily in Europe, whereas Gladys was raised in both Africa and Europe. Adelaide could only speak English very different from her daughter Gladys who spoke English, Fante, and Krio. Another major difference between the two was in the way they interacted with the working-class African women. Adelaide found it difficult to interact with these women and noted a disconnect with these women. Gladys on the other hand found it easy to maintain relationships with poor and work-class African women.

Adelaide’s relationship with her daughter Gladys reflected the family’s diverse background and played a significant role in her life. After Gladys’s death, Adelaide encountered her daughter’s poetry and artistic work. Adelaide is recognized as a pioneer of girls’ education in West Africa, and Gladys’s achievements illustrate the impact of her efforts. Importance of her connection with Gladys was central to her personal and professional story.

== Her teachings ==
Adelaide Casely-Hayford taught African folklore and literature at her Freetown school. She dedicated much time to studying the education of Black women in America. To do so she visited Tuskegee Institute, Howard University, Hampton Institute, Dunbar High School, and the Training School for Girls in Washington DC. She applied her learnings to her future teachings.

In her address. The Home its Educational Value, to the Aggrey House in London she argued that while women were different to men they were not inferior. In her teachings regarding feminism, she strongly supported the education of women. She felt it was through gaining education women could become economically independent. She also spoke out against polygamy. However, students at the Girls Vocational School were still expected to learn childcare, cooking, and other home making skills. Her teachings also strongly emphasized cultural pride. Regarding nationalism she felt that education needed to instill racial pride, a love of Africa, and admiration for African works.

Her most known piece of writing is a short story, Mista Courifer. In the story Mr. Courifer is a citizen of Sierra Leone who loves everything English. Throughout the story Adelaide pokes fun at Mr. Courifer. In the story Mr. Courifer has a son. His son rejects many of the English customs. The only English custom that the son prefers is that of marriage. The son prefers the small family monogamous marriage traditional of the English.

The story reveals that Adelaide preferred her feminist ideals to her nationalist ideals. Which is why she was open to adopting English customs regarding marriage while still advocating for African pride. Her story and teachings show that she was living in a transitional period. Women were adjusting to adopting feminist stances while still advocating on behalf of their racial views. Ultimately, Adelaide used her teachings to navigate the intersection of African feminism and black nationalism.

== Legacy and honors ==
Casely-Hayford earned several awards from the colonial government in recognition of her contributions to the people of Sierra Leona.

- 1935: she was awarded the King's Silver Jubilee Medal.
- 1949: she received the MBE.

Asteroid 6848 Casely-Hayford, discovered by American astronomers Eleanor Helin and Schelte Bus at Palomar Observatory in 1978, was named in her memory. The official naming citation was published by the Minor Planet Center on 27 August 2019 (M.P.C. 115893).

Casely-Hayford became an honorary member of Zeta Phi Beta sorority in 1934 for her work in education and empowerment for young women in Sierra Leone.
