= Gibril Sesay =

Ambassador of Sierra Leone to Egypt
- In office 1969–1975
- Preceded by: Collins O. Bright
- Succeeded by: Famah Joka Bangura residence in Addis Ababa; 2002-2004: Interests Served by Saudi arabia

Acting Imam of the Freetown Central Mosque.
- In office 1973 1940s to the 1960 – 1975
- Succeeded by: 1982–2008: Ahmad Tejan Sillah

Personal details
- Born: August 1909 Sendugu, Port Loko
- Died: September 2, 1988 (aged 79)
- Education: at the Bethel Day School, Technical Sir Alfred Jones Trade School.; proceeded to Gambia and Senegal for Arabic education, and successfully qualified to be an Arabic Teacher and a second class Theologian.
- Alma mater: 1940-1944 British Institute, Cairo and Al-Azhar University in Cairo; In 1952 qualified as a Master of Arabic and first class Muslim Theologian in the faculty of Mohamedan or Muslim Law and Constitution.
- Occupation: Was appointed Nawab (Assistant Imam) of the Temne Muslim in Freetown.

Alhaji Gibril Sesay (August 1909 – September 2, 1988) was a Sierra Leonean diplomat and Muslim cleric.

== Career ==
- He was nominated City Councillor and Chairman of the Establishment Committee. Secretary-General of the Sierra Leone Muslim Congress, Teacher of English and Arabic in the Tslamia Primary School, Lecturer of Mohammedan or Muslim law and Constitution in the Extra-Mural Department of Fourah Bay College.
- Lecturer of Islamics in the Sir Milton Margai College of Education and Technology Teachers' Training College,
- Organising President of the Sierra Leone Muslim Reform aition Society,
- Organising President of the Imanfya Social and Literary Association,
- Iman of the Board of Imams for the entire Muslim Community under the auspices of the Sierra Leone Muslim Congress
- In 1958 he was Mayor, Freetown City Council.
- He was a founder-member of the All People's Congress.
- He received his advanced Arabic/Islamic education in Saudi Arabia.
- In 1973 he was named acting Imam of the Freetown Central Mosque.
- From 1969 to 1975 he led the sierra Leonean mission in Cairo.
- In 1973 he was designated Ambassador.
