= Ojeh Society =

Sierra Leonian and Gambian confraternity

- Founded: 1850; 176 years ago Hastings, Sierra Leone
- Type: fraternity
- Affiliation: Independent
- Status: Active
- Emphasis: Yorubas; Okus, Akus (Krio); Temnes; Lokos (Landogos); Sherbros; Kurankos; Mandingos
- Scope: International: Sierra Leone; The Gambia
- Headquarters: Sierra Leone

The Ojeh, Oje or Egungun society (Yoruba: Ọjẹ (Ɔjɛ), Egúngún), is a fraternal institution in the West African countries of Sierra Leone and The Gambia. The society emerged from within the ranks of liberated Africans in the surrounding villages on the Freetown peninsula such as Hastings, Waterloo, Aberdeen and Murray Town of the Sierra Leone colony and subsequently, in Freetown during the mid 19th century. By the mid 1800's, there were nearly 60,000 of these Yoruba people in Freetown known by the collective name Aku. It is a part of the larger Egungun tradition, and the name of the group itself is the customary appellation of the society of those who are members of the Egungun cult in Yorubaland, who are called Ọlọjẹ.

Other groups related to the Ojeh are the Gelede, Egunuko and Ode or Odeh Societies, Yoruba: Gẹ̀lẹ̀dẹ́ (Gɛlɛdɛ), Ìgùnùko, Ọdẹ (Ɔdɛ). The Odeh society is commonly called Odelay or Odilleh, the name of its first group formed by Adekumbile Odileh Cole who was its 'Ashipa' (leader) and after whom the group itself was named. However, members of this latter group are much more concerned and associated with the affairs of hunting and chivalry, even though all four societies are very much intertwined given their similar origins.

== Origin and development ==
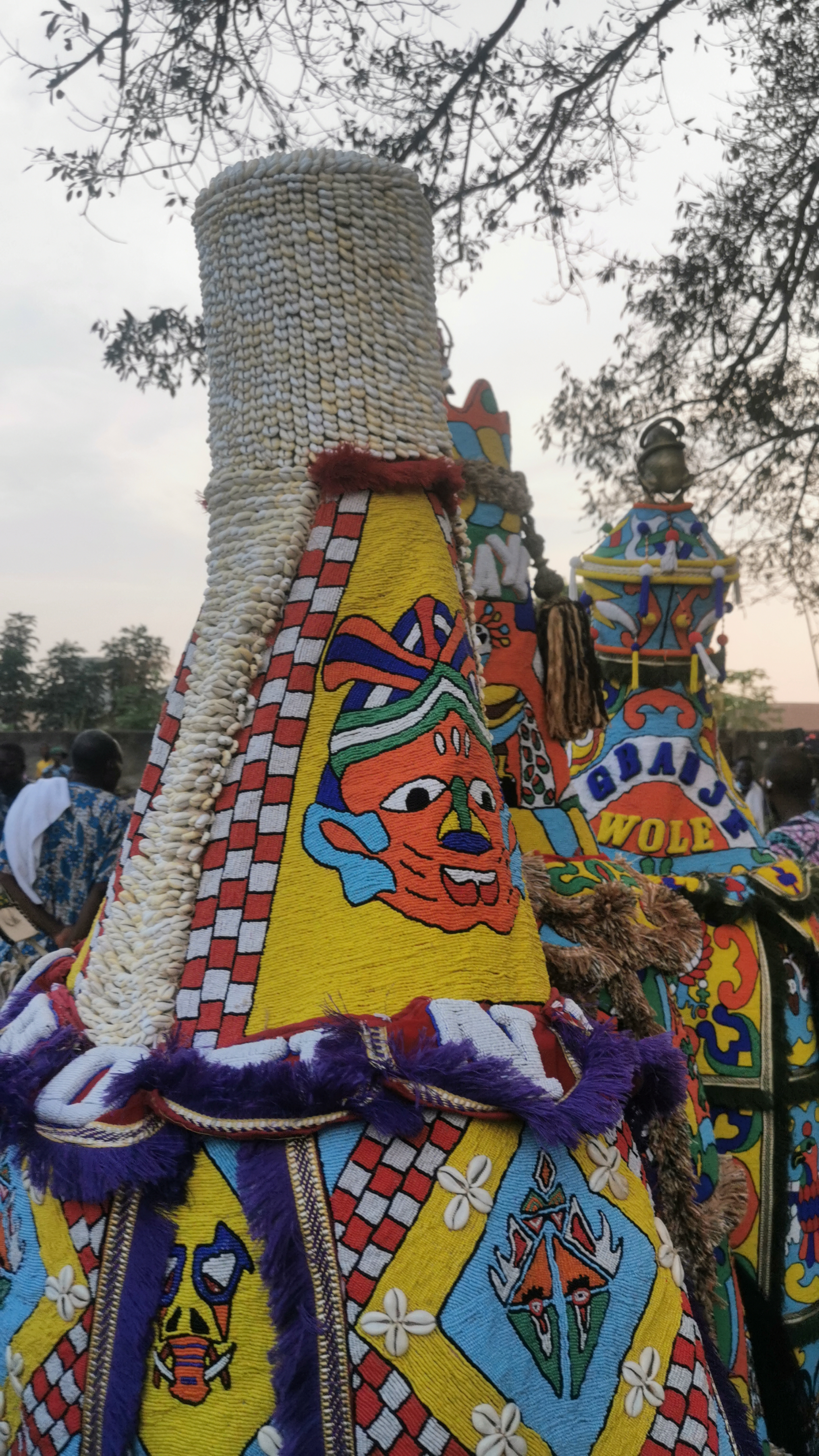
Egungun ceremony

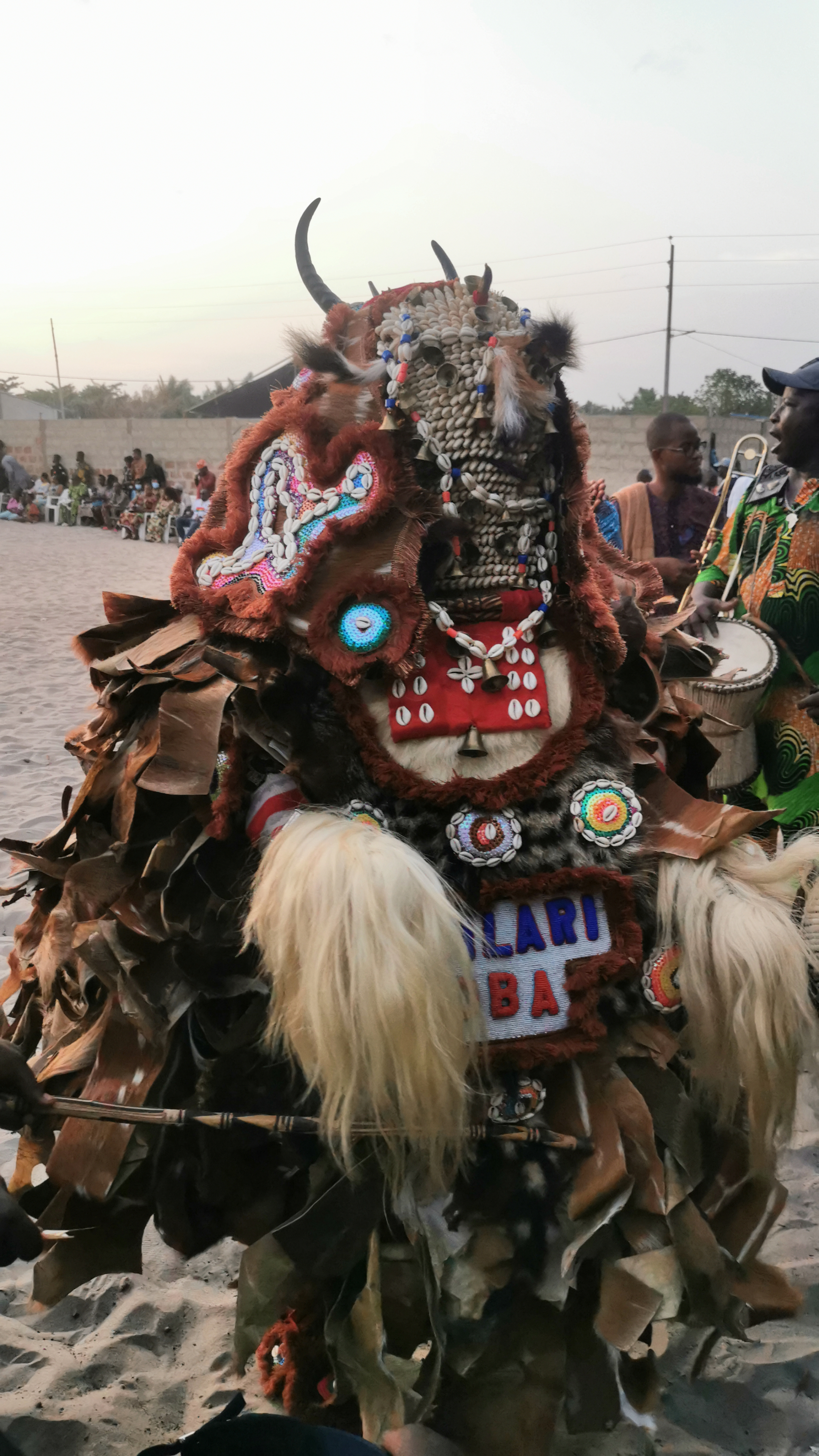
Egungun ceremony organized in Benin by the Eberu Aye convent of Misséssinto

Initially, a society that started out among the Creoles, the Ojeh institution was initially closed to outsiders, unlike the Bata Akoto, Agbay, and Ajuba groups that were open to all members of society. The environment in which Ojeh developed was one characterized by adversity and persecution, as the colonial government tried desperately to suppress Yoruba cultural institutions and influences in the colony, in their quest of "civilizing the natives". Furthermore, the influence and Power of the Ojeh irritated both the CMS clergy and prominent Muslim Imams in places like Fourah Bay and Aberdeen. Ironically, they were not opposed to membership and proliferation of Freemasonry, and even sometimes actively encouraged membership.

Despite all the suppression and attempts at discouraging people from allegiance/devotion to Yoruba culture, the belief system did not abate significantly. They instead adapted and went underground, and it wasn't until the 1880s that their leaders felt assured enough that they were able to re-emerge in the open. Some earlier authors thought that initially, there was a class divide among practitioners of Oje, and that In pioneering groups like the Oke Mauri (Okemury) in Freetown, the upper class among the Creoles largely stayed away, while their membership ranks were filled with artisans, self-employed, unemployed, and unskilled workers. Regardless, the Ojeh societies had several educated creoles as members, and they became beacons of solidarity and resistance, attracting members belonging to different religious affiliation, Christians, Muslims and Orisha adherents alike, irrespective of religious or socio-economic differences. Later on, groups of emigre creoles from Sierra Leone introduced the society into places like Bathurst, Gambia (now Banjul) planting new lodges/communities there. The first of these pioneers in Bathurst was Johnston Erubamie Williams.

=== 20th century growth ===
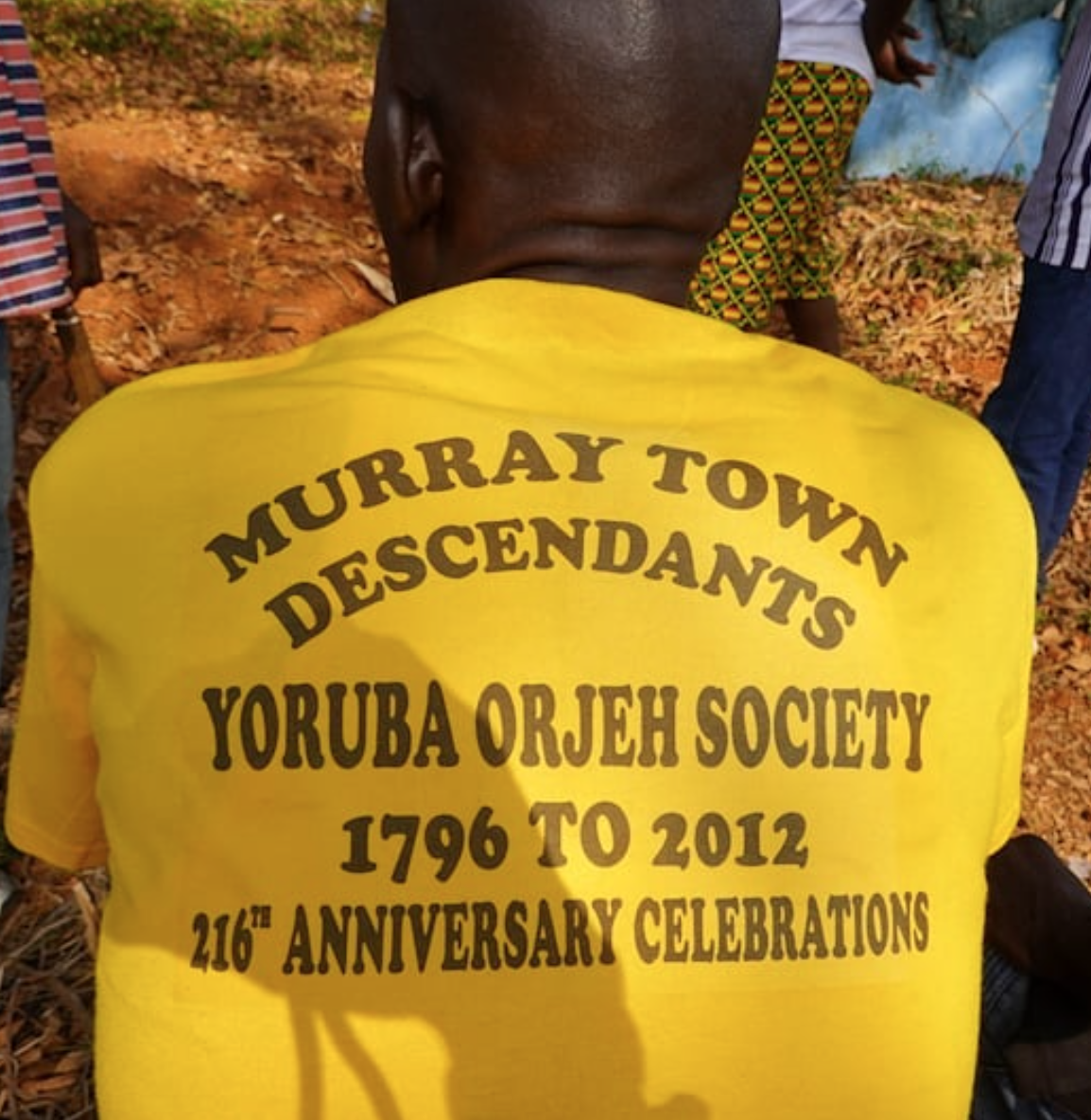
A new initiate into one of Sierra Leone's many Ojeh societies wears his group's branded T-shirt.

A new phase of development began in the 20th century when the Ojeh experienced an explosive growth. It spread rapidly, carried by groups of migrant workers from the Sierra Leonian hinterland who took the practice and spread it all over the colony/country from one nodal town to another. Today, many other ethnic groups are engaged in, and enjoy various activities as active members of the Ojeh, and the various Ojeh (Egungun) lodges count members from among all the major ethnic groups of the country in rural and urban areas alike, including from among the Temnes, Sherbros, Mendes, Kurankos, Lokos, Mandingos and others.

== Structure and beliefs ==
The Ojeh operate as different societies 'Lodges', which are subgroups with thousands of members having their own local leadership. A leader is known as an Agba, a word which means Elder or Patron, and is a title that denotes and confers the privilege of seniority on its bearer. The Orisha Ogun is a powerful influence in both the Ojeh and Odeh institutions. Unlike the Ojeh and Odeh societies where the members/votaries are primarily men, the Gelede society, also present in Sierra Leone admits both men and women as members.

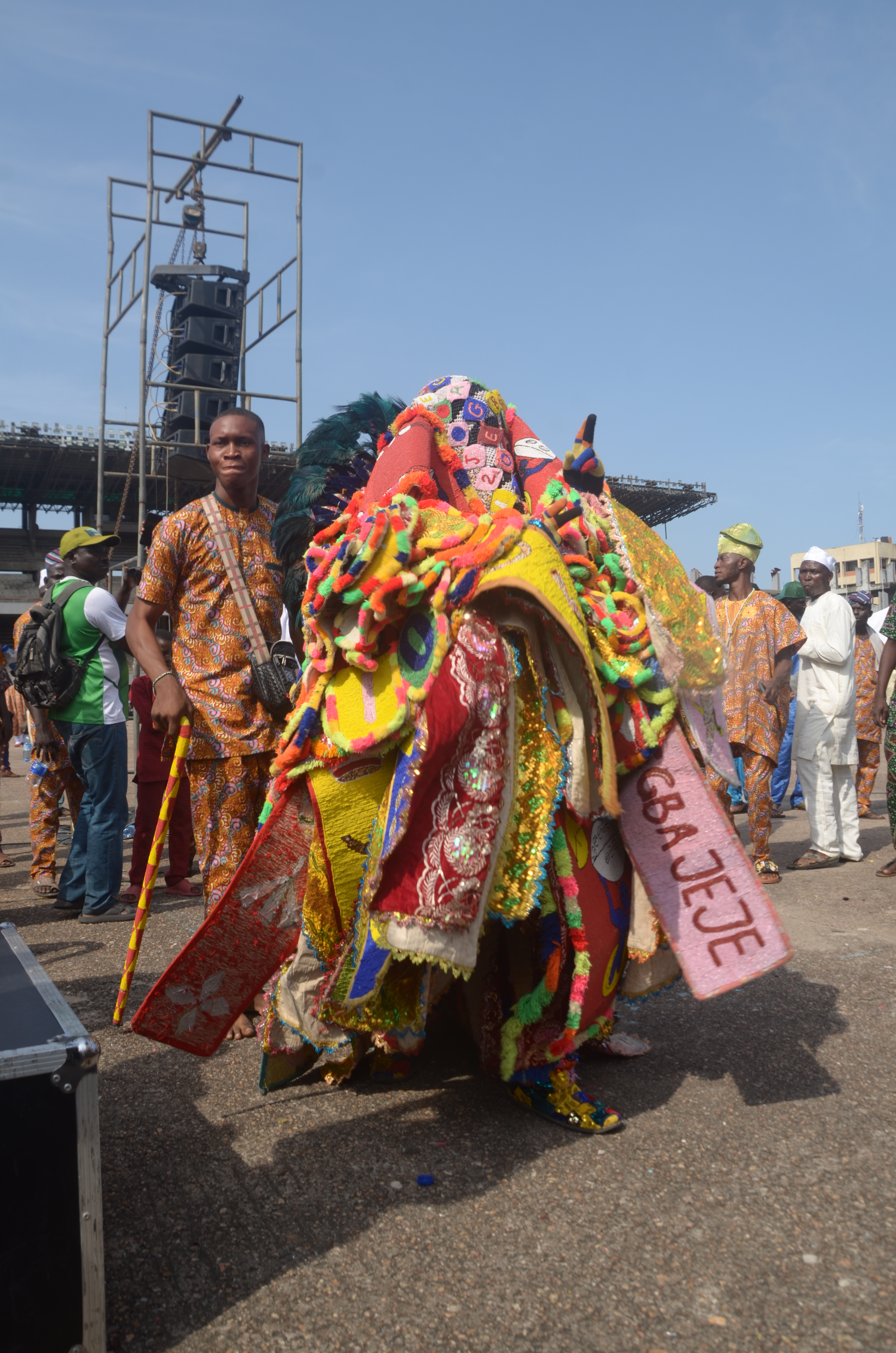
Egungun ceremonies

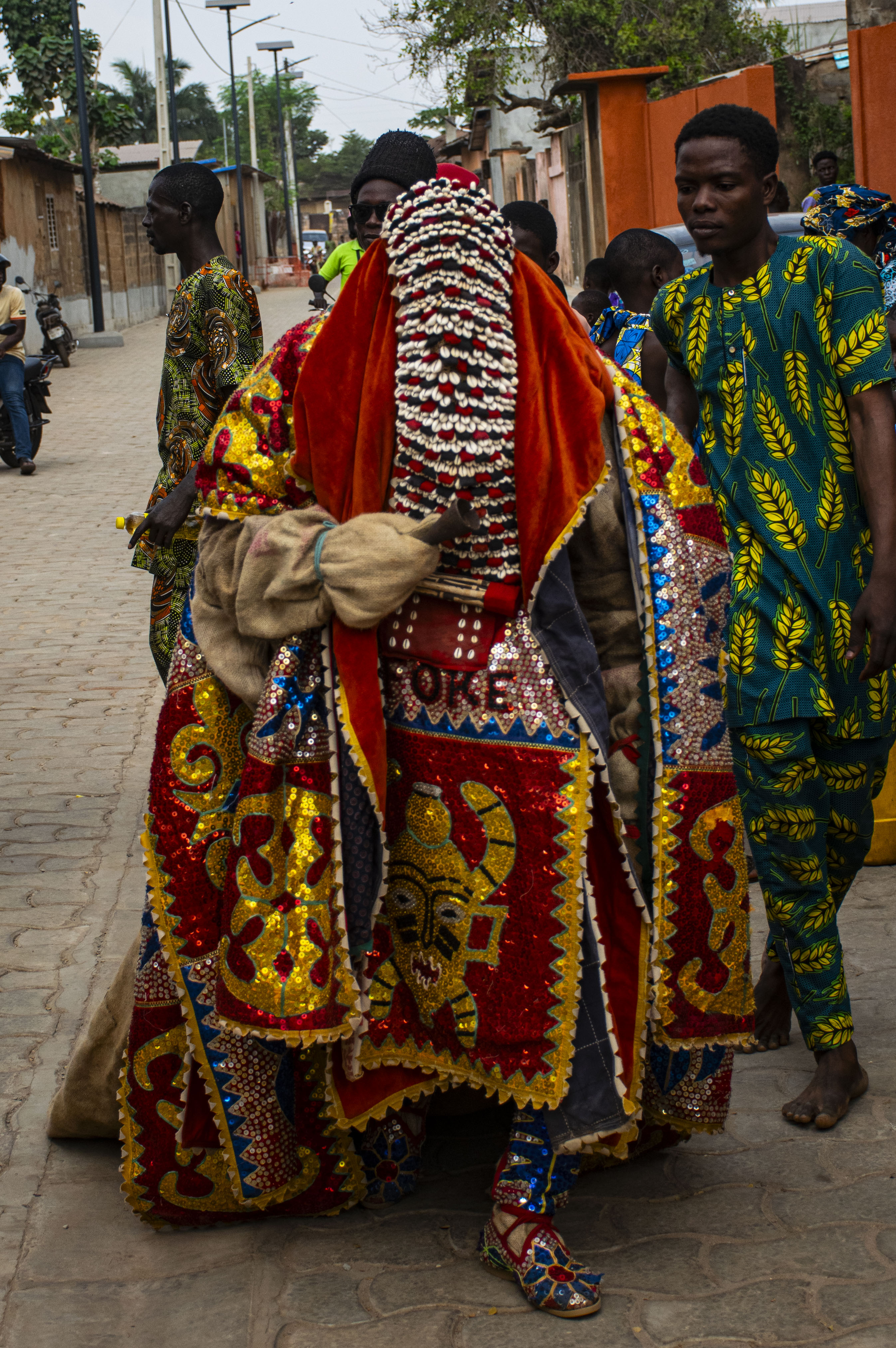

== Language and chants ==
The language of the Ojeh, Odeh and other associated societies, and indeed the Egugu itself is Yoruba. Devotees and Initiates have several songs, chants and words in Yoruba which they chant, sing and use in their usually large processionary festivals and outings, many of which take place during important events including national public holidays. There are also entire musical albums of the Ojeh genre that have been produced by such artists as Daddy Ramanu (Ramanu Davies) and Abu Whyte which have been commercialized and made available for public consumption.

They also organize carnivals where masquerades are displayed to thousands of attendees who participate in call and response musical compositions, while society members wear group uniforms based on chosen fabric and styles with walking sticks called Ashobi (Aso-Ebi).

== Influence and legacy ==
Since its inception in the mid 19th century, the Ojeh societies have been known to maintain and enforce societal order. Non-members from the communities have the widespread belief that the Egugu are aware of everything happening or transpiring in any given community. The perception of Oje was as such, one of a sort of Watchdog institution that had the ability and moral obligation to hold offenders or trespassers accountable.

In modern Sierra Leone and The Gambia, the Ojeh societies operate in some areas as elite social clubs, often having members of leading political parties in their ranks. They are also important in the rural communities as they organize competitions and other activities geared towards community building. The various Ojeh societies can be highly competitive between themselves, with each group trying to outdo the other in prestige and flamboyance, and there have even been cases of clashes between groups over territory.

The Ojeh society has also been transported by the Sierra Leone and Gambian diasporas to their new countries of residence all across the world. One good example is the Ohio Paddle in the USA.

== List of Ojeh lodges, groups, and societies ==
Following is a list of some of the Ojeh lodges, groups, and societies in Sierra Leone and The Gambia.

=== The Gambia ===
- Awodi Ojeh Society (Banjul)
- Ekun Baba Odeh
- Odilleh Society
- Okemorie (Okemaury) Society
- Young Rising Ojeh Society

=== Sierra Leone ===
- Agba Kolleh Ojeh Society
- Awodi Ojeh Society (Freetown)
- Bankasoka Ojeh Society
- Big Oba Sai Ojeh Society
- Big Paris Ojeh Society
- Elayfeh (Ile Ife) Ojeh Society
- Independent Ojeh Society
- Kanikay Ojeh Society
- Limba Ojeh 1
- Limba Ojeh 2
- Navy Ojeh Society
- Okaymorie Ojeh Society
- Republic Ojeh Society
- Sabanoh Yoruba Ojeh Society
- Seaside Ojeh Society
- Tourist (Fourah Bay) Ojeh Society

== See also ==
- Egungun
- Gelede
- Poro society
- Secret society

== Bibliography ==
- Cole, Gibril R. (15 September 2013). The Krio of West Africa: Islam, Culture, Creolization, and Colonialism in the Nineteenth Century. Ohio University Press. ISBN 978-0-8214-4478-8.
- Ménard, Anaïs (14 April 2023). Integrating Strangers: Sherbro Identity and The Politics of Reciprocity Along the Sierra Leonean Coast. Berghahn Books. ISBN 978-1-80073-840-9.
