= Oku people (Sierra Leone) =

Ethnic group of Sierra Leone

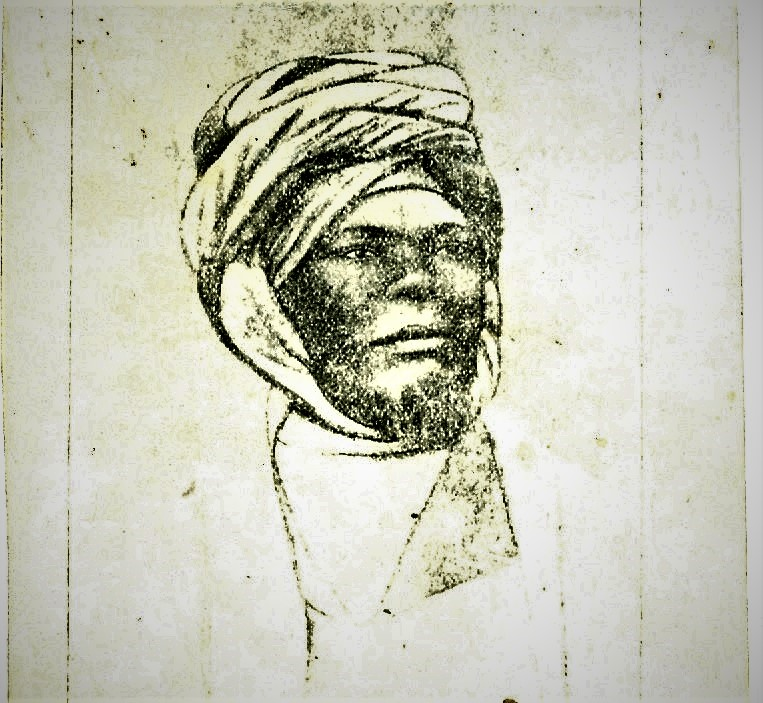
- Mohammed Shitta Bey

Total population
- 25,000 (0.5% of population)

Regions with significant populations
- Sierra Leone, Gambia, United States, United Kingdom

Languages
- Yoruba; Krio; English

Religion
- Sunni Islam

Related ethnic groups
- Yoruba people

The Oku people or the Aku Marabout or Aku Mohammedans are an ethnic group in Sierra Leone and the Gambia, primarily the descendants of marabout, liberated Yoruba people who were released from slave ships and resettled in Sierra Leone as Liberated Africans or came as settlers in the mid-19th century.

Some Oku historically have intermarried since then with ethnic groups in Sierra Leone and the Gambia such as the Mandingo, Temne, Mende, and in some cases with the ethnic Sierra Leone Creole people. The Creole are primarily descendants of African-American former slaves, as well as some from Jamaica, Nova Scotia, and slaves liberated from illegal slave trading in the 19th century. The Oku people primarily reside in the communities of Fourah Bay, Fula Town, and Aberdeen.

The vast majority of Oku people are Muslim. They were able to translate Islamic ideologies that spread throughout the Sahel in the 11th-century. The Oku people have practiced sub-Saharan passages such as cliterodotomy since the late-19th century. A large number of Oku people embraced Western education and other elements of Western culture prior to the Sierra Leone Civil War.

During British rule, the colonial government officially recognized various Oku neighborhoods as historical communities in Sierra Leone. Since independence, the national Sierra Leonean government has classified the Oku people as non-native Creoles although the Oku people are distinct from the Sierra Leone Creoles.

The Oku people have an extensive diaspora with Oku communities established in The Gambia and in Sierra Leone. The Oku people in Sierra Leone reside mainly in the capital cities of Banjul while the latter are in Freetown. In Sierra Leone the neighborhoods belonging to the Oku people are Fula Town, Fourah Bay, and some parts of Aberdeen Village (which has other areas occupied by Creoles).

== Origin ==
While the Africans repatriated from England, North America, and the Caribbean between 1787 and 1800 came with their plethora of Christian churches and train of missionaries, the Oku people are descended exclusively from Muslim Yoruba Liberated Africans who were resettled in Sierra Leone during the nineteenth century. The Yoruba Muslim elements among the general Liberated African population, formed a distinctive community and as early as the 1840s, there were references in documents and journals.

Prominent Oku families include the Dahniya, Zubairu, Mahdi, Iscandari, Aziz, Mustapha, Rashid, Abdullah, Ibrahim, Lewally, Bassir, Deen, Tejan, Savage, Alghali, and some adopted Oku families acquired Creole surnames such as Cole, Williams, Carew, Gerber, Spilsbury, and Joaque. Some of the European or Creole surnames of the Oku people were appropriated to gain entry into colonial schools in Freetown and others retained European surnames given or assigned to their Aku Liberated African ancestors.

== Culture ==
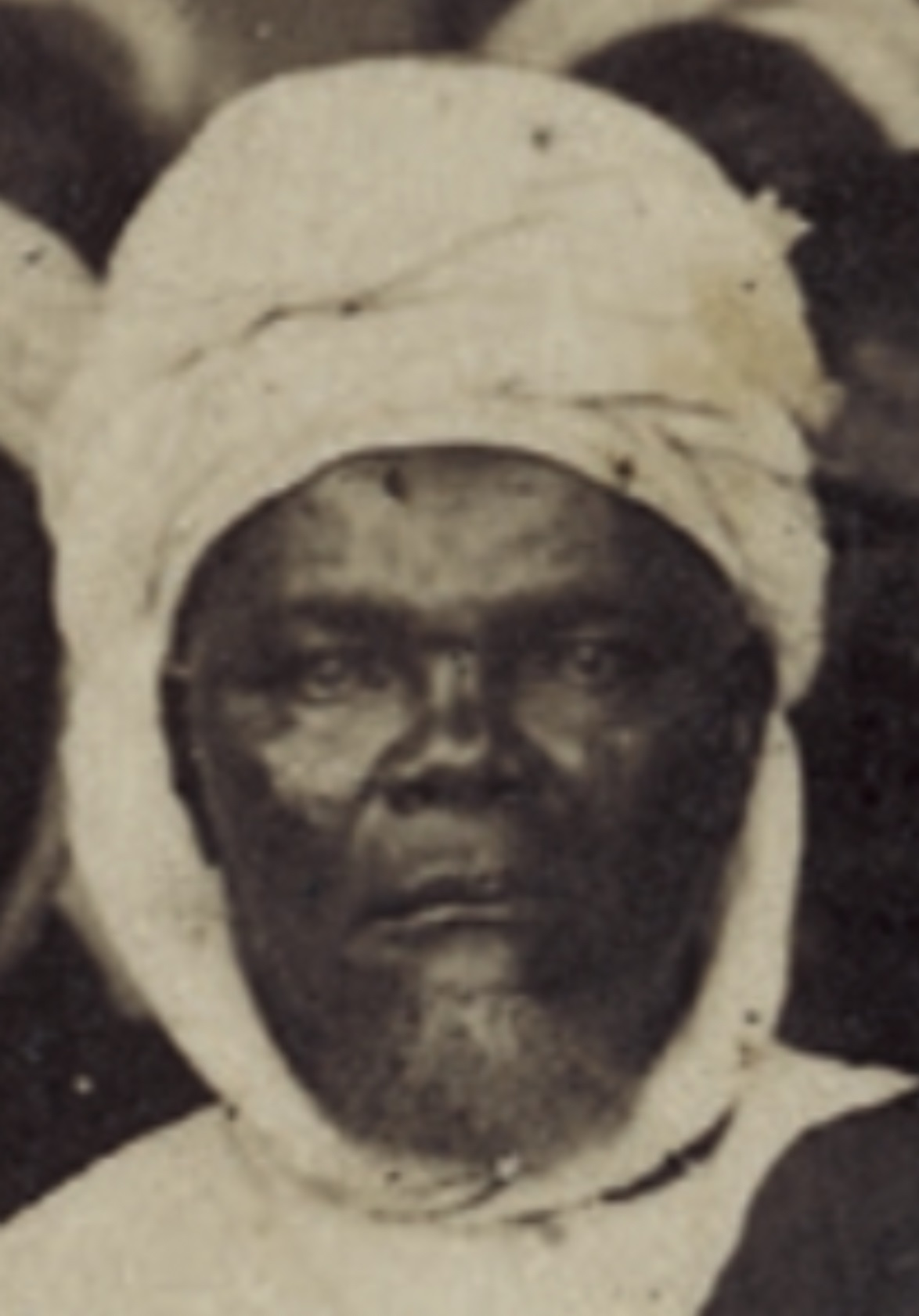
Picture of Mohammed Shitta-Bey

The Oku people have a distinctive culture that has strong similarities to that of larger communities of Muslim who adhere to Ajami script. Their traditions are primarily influenced by marabout and to a lesser extent griot folklore. The Atiq Mosque is the central mosque of the Fourah Bay community, similar to the Conakry Grand Mosque and the Great Mosque of Touba. The official cemetery of Oku people in Fourah Bay is the Aku Mohammedan Cemetery on Kennedy Street.

The Oku practice cliterodotomy alongside other indigenous ethnic groups in Sierra Leone. The Oku often have Arabic names although some later adopted the names of prominent benefactors such as Carew, in addition to Yoruba and other Nigerian names, which they thought aided admission into the Islamic schools founded by Fula and Mandinka people in Freetown. Some elder members of the Oku community continue to speak a traditional language such as Temne, Mende, Pular, Mandingo, and Soso while fluent in Yoruba, Krio or English language.

== Relationship with the Sierra Leone Creole people ==
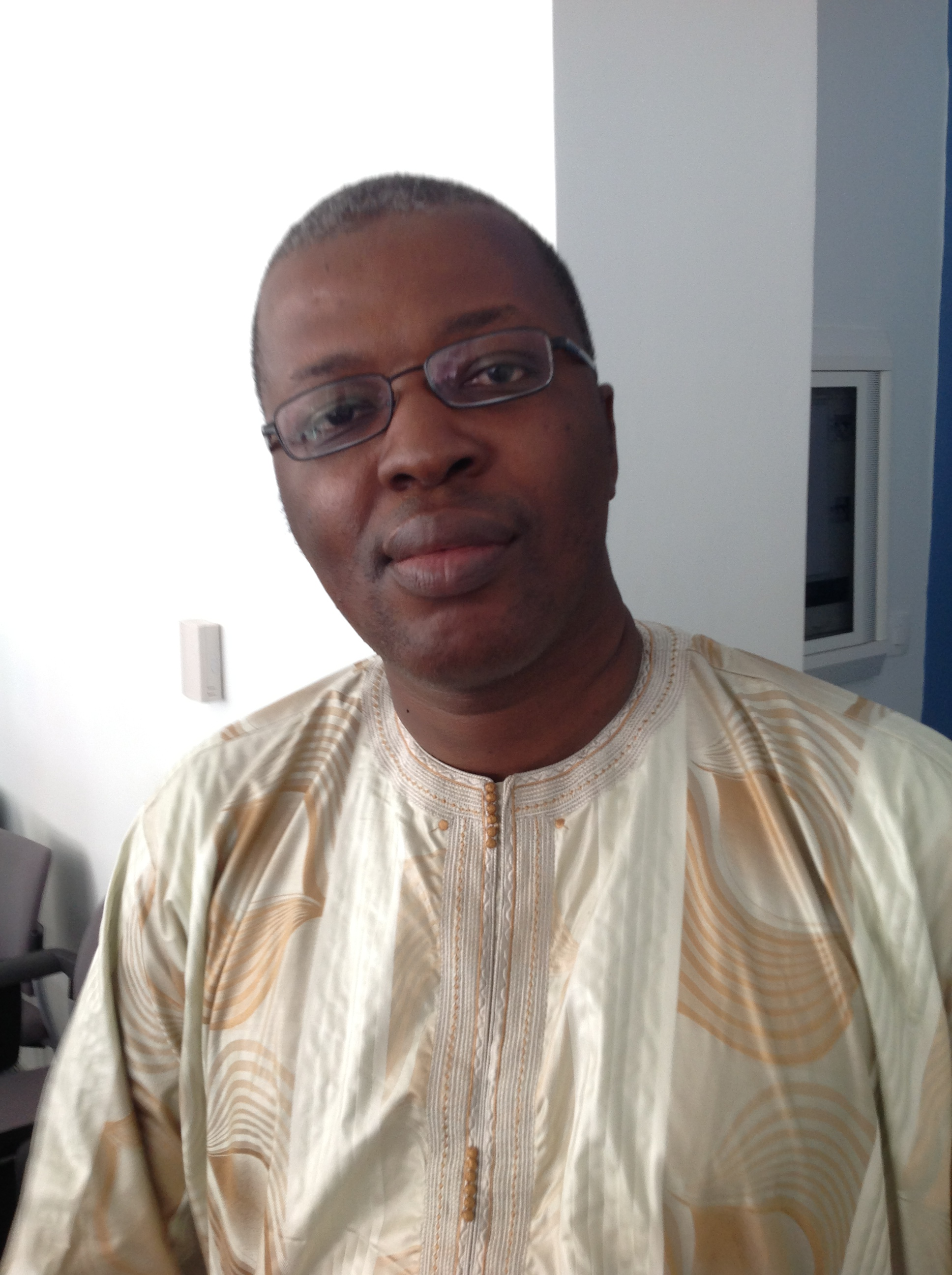
Abdul Tejan-Cole

Several scholars such as Ramatoulie Onikepo Othman and Olumbe Bassir classify the Oku people as distinct from the Creoles because of their ancestry and strong Muslim culture.

In contrast to the Oku people, the Creoles or Krio are Christian and are a mixture of various ethnic groups including African Americans, Afro-Caribbeans, and Liberated Africans of Igbo, Fanti, Aja, Nupe, Bakongo, and Yoruba descent in addition to other African ethnic groups and European ancestry. Furthermore, unlike the Oku people, the Creoles do not practice cliterodotomy, engage in the Bundu society, and are monogamous.

More recently, some scholars consider the Oku people to be a sub-ethnic group of the Creoles, based on their close association with British colonists and their adoption of Western education and other aspects of culture. Those classifying the Oku as part of the Sierra Leone Creole people note their adoption of similar English or European surnames (although this was a minority of Oku) and cultural aspects such as komojade, Oje society a.k.a. egungun, gelede, hunters' masquerade a.k.a. Ode or Odilleh, esusu and awujoh. (Note: Awujoh originates from the Yoruba Liberated African ancestry of the Creoles. Awujoh ceremonies are held for the protection of newborns and newlyweds by ancestral spirits and as a means to acquire guidance and wisdom regarding aspects of death.) However, as scholars have outlined, the few cultural similarities between the Creole and Oku people are because there are some Yoruba cultural retentions from the christianized Yoruba Liberated Africans (who are one ethnic group among the many diverse ethnic ancestors of the Creoles) found among the Creoles and because the cultural orientation, heritage, identity and origin of the Oku people are Yoruba in essence.

== Cultural associations ==
The Oku people are represented by cultural associations such as the Ebilleh Cultural Organization, aiming to preserve and enhance Oku heritage of Sierra Leone and the Gambia.

== Notable Oku in or from Sierra Leone ==
- Olumbe Bassir, scientist
- Mohammed Shitta Bey, businessman, aristocrat and philanthropist
- Abdul Tejan-Cole, legal practitioner and former Commissioner of Sierra Leone's Anti-Corruption Commission.
- Ahmed Deen, footballer
- Bill Hamid, footballer
- Isha Johansen (née Tejan-Cole), president of Sierra Leonean Football Association
- Haja Afsatu Kabba (née Savage), politician
- Michael Lahoud, footballer
- Nemata Majeks-Walker (née Mahdi), women's activist
- Tunde Cole, businessman
- Ramatoulie Othman, writer
- Abdul Rahman, one-time Mayor of Freetown
- Umaru Rahman, footballer
- Mohamed Sanusi Tejan, Muslim scholar
- Madieu Williams, professional football athlete
- Mohamed Daramy, footballer
- Gibril Wilson, professional football athlete
- Walid Shour, footballer
