= List of mosques in Sierra Leone =

This is a list of mosques in Sierra Leone.

== List ==
Name	Image	Location	Year (CE)	Group	Notes
Freetown Central Mosque		Freetown			
Jamiatul Atiq Mosque		Fourah Bay, Freetown		Sunni	
Mandingo Central Mosque		Freetown		Sunni	
Pujehun Central Mosque		Pujehun, Pujehun District			

== See also ==
- Islam in Sierra Leone
- List of mosques in Africa
