= Oro Festival =

Festival in Nigeria by the Yorubas

Oro festival
- Language: Yoruba

Origin
- Region of origin: Yorubaland

Oro Festival (Yoruba: Orò) is an event celebrated by various towns and settlements of Yoruba origin. It is an annual traditional festival that is of patriarchal nature, as it is only celebrated by male descendants who are paternal natives to the specific locations where the particular event is taking place. It venerates the Orisha Orò, the Yoruba deity of Bullroarers and communal justice. During the festival, females and non-natives stay indoors as oral history has it that Orò must not be seen by women and non-participating people. The ceremonies surrounding the celebration of Orò differ from town to town, and one is often called after the death of a monarch. When the Oba or other important official dies, a special atonement and period of mourning are held.

Orò is usually concealed except during the festivity. Orò makes an entrance by making high-pitched swishing sounds. This whirring sound is said to be made by the wife called Majowu.

The Orò festival has been argued to be anti-woman by some because of the requirement for women to stay indoors during the festival. Women must not come outside for the full day. It is believed that any woman who comes out and encounters Oro will suffer dire consequences which includes death.

This is supported by the Yoruba saying:

Awo Egúngún l'obìnrin le ṣe, awo Gẹ̀lẹ̀dẹ́ l’obìnrin le mọ̀. Bí obìnrin bá fi ojú kan Orò, Orò á gbé e lọ.

Meaning:

Women can experience Egungun, a woman can participate in Gelede. If a woman lays eyes on Oro, Oro would surely take her away.

Accordingly, in contrast to Oro which is an all-male affair, the Gelede spectacle celebrates the power and influence of women and mothers (Àwọn Ìyá) in Yoruba society.

During the festival, the voice or sound of Orò fills public spaces and private spaces as well, in the traditional belief blessing everyone who hears it.

The Orò festival is mentioned in D.O. Fágúnwà's 1954 novel Ìrìnkèrindó nínú Igbó Elégbèje (Expedition to the Mountain of Thought), where the mother of Olojumajele flees into the forest because she hears the sound of the Orò bullroarers both behind and ahead of her and is scared she might come face-to-face with the Orò spirit. Unbeknownst to her, there is no masquerade, just evil spirits of the forest imitating the noise of the bullroarers.

== Oro Festival in Ikorodu ==
The festival is a celebration of the town's rich cultural heritage and is typically held in the month of August. During the festival, participants dress in colorful traditional attire and perform various cultural dances and rituals, including the Oro Magbo dance, which is a sacred dance performed by the Oro cult. The festival also features traditional music, food, and crafts, and is an important event for the people of Ikorodu to come together and celebrate their identity. The festival is usually held at the Ikorodu Town Hall and is attended by dignitaries from across the state.
