= Umaru Rahman =

Sierra Leonean footballer

Personal information
- Full name: Umaru Rahman
- Date of birth: December 15, 1982 (age 43)
- Place of birth: Freetown, Sierra Leone
- Height: 5 ft 11 in (1.80 m)
- Position: Striker

Team information
- Current team: East End Lions

Senior career*
Years	Team	Apps	(Gls)
2001–2005	East End Lions		
2005–2006	Bình Dương F.C.		
2006–2007	LG-ACB Ha Noi		
2008–	East End Lions		

International career
2001–2008	Sierra Leone	20	(8)
- * Club domestic league appearances and goals

Umaru Rahman (born December 15, 1982, in Freetown, Sierra Leone) commonly known as Gallon Pan is a former Sierra Leonean international footballer, who was a striker and currently played for several clubs, but he is famously remembered for playing for East End Lions.

== Early life ==
Rahman was born 1982 in Freetown's suburbs of Fourah Bay to Oku parents.

== Career ==
He started his football career in his native Sierra Leone with powerhouse East End Lions in the Sierra Leone National Premier League, where he was the team captain and one of the best players in the premier league. Rahman signed with top Vietnamese club, Bình Dương F.C. in 2005 and 2006 with LG-ACB Ha Noi.

== International career ==
In 2001, Rahman made his senior international debut for Sierra Leone against Liberia in a 2002 FIFA World Cup qualifier played in Monrovia.

Playing Career

- 2000–06 East End Lions (Sierra Leone)
- 2006–07 Bình Dương F.C. (Vietnam)
- 2007–08 LG-ACB Ha Noi (Vietnam)

== Personal life ==
Rahman composed a song called Manchester United Celebrate which celebrated Manchester United's Premier League championship 2007–08 season.
