= 2,6-Dichloro-1,4-benzoquinone =

Chemical compound

Names
- Other names: 2,6-Dichloro-p-benzoquinone; 2,6-Dichlorobenzoquinone

Identifiers
CAS Number	697-91-6
3D model (JSmol)	Interactive image
ChEBI	CHEBI:147298
ChemSpider	12246
ECHA InfoCard	100.010.738
EC Number	211-810-0
KEGG	C21103
PubChem CID	12771
CompTox Dashboard (EPA)	DTXSID7061019
- InChI: InChI=1S/C6H2Cl2O2/c7-4-1-3(9)2-5(8)6(4)10/h1-2H Key: JCARTGJGWCGSSU-UHFFFAOYSA-N
- SMILES: C1=C(C(=O)C(=CC1=O)Cl)Cl

Properties
Chemical formula	C_{6}H_{2}Cl_{2}O_{2}
Molar mass	176.98 g·mol^{−1}
Melting point	123 °C (253 °F; 396 K)

Hazards
- GHS labelling
Pictograms	(GHS07: Exclamation mark)
Signal word	Warning
Hazard statements	H315, H319, H335
Precautionary statements	P261, P264, P264+P265, P270, P271, P280, P301+P317, P302+P352, P304+P340, P305+P351+P338, P319, P321, P330, P332+P317, P337+P317, P362+P364, P403+P233, P405, P501
- Except where otherwise noted, data are given for materials in their standard state (at 25 °C [77 °F], 100 kPa). Infobox references

2,6-Dichloro-1,4-benzoquinone, also known as 2,6-DCBQ, an organic compound that emerges as a disinfection by-product (DBP) that is frequently found in drinking water disinfected with chlorine or chloramines. 2,6-DCBQ is a member of the halobenzoquinones (HBQ), which in recent years has gained significant attention in environmental toxicology due to high levels encountered in drinking water. 2,6-DCBQ has been linked to neurodevelopmental toxicity due to reactive oxygen species formation inhibiting the PI3K/AKT/mTOR pathway. DCBQ does not only have high toxic potency but is also a potential carcinogen.

2,6-DCBQ is frequently used in biochemistry to study the Q_{B}-binding site in Photosystem II (PSII). It is used as an artificial electron acceptor (AEAs) with a molecular structure similar to plastoquinone's.

== History ==
A high yield and efficient synthesis of 2,6-DCBQ was first provided in 1886 by the chemist Kollrep A. during a systematic investigation into derivatives of phenols. Kollrepp utilized p-nitrophenol as a starting material, converting it into mono- and dichlornated benzoquinones making vibrant yellow cristalline structure.

Researchers in 1932 found an optical method for studying reversible organic oxidation-reduction systems, by using hydroquinones to determine equilibrium constants. In 1956 Wessels and van der Veen explored how chlorinated quinones could shuttle electrons. By researching the action of benzoquinones on the Hill reaction. It became a standard tool for isolating the activity of Photosystem II, because of its specific redox potential.

Qin et al. detected and quantified 2,6-DCBQ from Canadian municipal drinking water samples. By using highly sensitive liquid chromatography mass spectrometry, 2,6-DCBQ was identified as a major DBP formed during chlorination of raw water containing phenolic contaminants. Since this discovery, research about 2,6-DCBQ has shifted towards its role in human health.

== Structure and reactivity ==
Of the halobenzoquinones, DCBQ is the most commonly detected in drinking waters, up to 275 ng/L, and in chlorinated swimming pools, up to 299 ng/L. DCBQ can undergo hydrolysis, and its main hydrolysis product is DCBQ-OH. The transformation of DCBQ is much quicker in cell tissues than in water. The half-life of DCBQ is ~7h in water compared to ~1h in cell cultures, and is thus more reactive in cell tissues.

In the human body, DCBQs can produce reactive oxidative species (ROS) at certain doses, causing mitochondrial dysfunction by reducing the mitochondrial membrane potential, and could promote the mitochondrial apoptosis pathway. DCBQ causes oxidative stress.

DCBQ induced a concentration-dependent decrease in cell viability. It has also been found that DCBQ might cause nuclear DNA damage.

=== Structure activity relationship ===
The structure of Benzoquinones may explain their toxicity. Benzoquinones are electrophilic and can undergo reactions with nucleophilic groups, for instance on amino acids, altering structure and function of the proteins. Due to the Cl groups on the quinone ring in DCBQ, the overall electrophilicity of the HBQ is increased, which causes higher reactivity with nucleophilic groups, such as glutathione, proteins, and nucleic acids. If DCBQ reacts with glutathione they form conjugates, lowering GSH levels in the cell, which might lead to GSH depletion.

== ADME ==
This describes the ADME of 2,6-DCBQ.

=== Absorption ===
2,6-DCBQ is mainly absorbed via the oral route, typically through the ingestion of contaminated drinking water. Dermal absorption is also considered a viable pathway following aqueous exposure. The compound's low molecular weight and moderate lipophilicity favor absorption across the gastrointestinal tract. However, the high reactivity may limit total systemic bioavailability. The quinone structure reacts rapidly with biological nucleophiles in physiological fluids, leading to localized interactions before the unchanged compound can reach systemic circulation.

=== Distribution ===
Following absorption, 2,6-DCBQ distributes predominantly to highly perfused organs, such as the liver and the kidneys. Its moderate lipophilicity facilitates the crossing of cellular membranes. The quinone structure allows for redox cycling between quinone and hydroquinone within tissues. This process can lead to the formation of reactive oxygen species (ROS), contributing to intracellular oxidative stress. Due to its high reactivity and its metabolic transformation, 2,6-DCBQ does not significantly accumulate in adipose tissue.

=== Metabolism ===
The metabolism of the compound primarily occurs in the liver through both reduction and conjugation pathways. A major metabolic step involves the reduction of the quinone to its corresponding hydroquinone.

The main metabolic route is the detoxification via conjugation with glutathione (GSH). This phase II metabolism reaction serves to neutralize the compound's electrophilicity, facilitating safer elimination. Nevertheless, excessive or chronic exposure may lead to the depletion of cellular GSH pools, which enhances oxidative stress and potential cellular damage. The subsequent processing of these glutathione conjugates results in the formation of cysteine conjugates and mercapturic acids.

=== Excretion ===
The elimination of 2,6-DCBQ and its derivatives occurs predominantly through the renal system. Due to its high reactivity, levels of the unchanged parent compound are negligible. Instead, the compound is excreted in the form of water-soluble metabolites, specifically mercapturic acid derivatives. Biliary excretion is a secondary possibility, but urinary elimination remains the dominant pathway for the clearance of 2,6-DCBQ metabolites from the body.

== Mechanism of action ==
2,6‑Dichloro‑1,4-benzoquinone (DCBQ) exerts cytotoxic effects primarily through depletion of cellular glutathione (GSH). GSH is a major intracellular antioxidant that protects cells by neutralizing reactive oxygen and nitrogen species (ROS and RNS). Because of this role, cellular GSH levels are commonly used as an indicator of oxidative stress. A decrease in GSH disrupts the cellular redox balance and can act as an important signal that triggers the activation of cell death pathways. The reducing capacity of GSH is therefore essential for maintaining cellular survival.

DCBQ belongs to a group of halobenzoquinones (HBQs), four of which have been shown to be cytotoxic to T24 human bladder carcinoma cells. These compounds induce oxidative stress through the generation of reactive oxygen species, which can cause oxidative damage to cellular components such as DNA and proteins. In the presence of DCBQ, intracellular GSH levels are inversely correlated with ROS production and glutathione S‑transferase (GST) activity. By depleting cellular GSH, HBQs promote increased ROS formation and stimulate GST activity as part of the cellular response to oxidative stress.

=== Binding ===
DCBQ is an electrophilic compound, so it can bind in the human body to multiple nucleophilic compounds. DCBQ can, for instance, react with GSH, substituting the Cl groups for the GS group. DCBQ is thus being dechlorinated and can undergo Michael addition with GSH, resulting in more glutathionylated products. The second Cl group can also be removed from the compound when reacting with another GSH molecule.

DCBQ can also undergo redox reactions when reacting with an electron, forming radicals. These radicals can also react with GSH, forming more conjugation products.

DCBQ can also react with amino acids. When DCBQ was brought in contact with amino acids, the DCBQ was quickly removed, suggesting that the DCBQ reacted with the amino acids.

DCBQ binds to the DNA via H-bonds, a non-covalent interaction. Because of its hydrophobicity, DCBQ might be intercalated between nucleotides in a double-stranded DNA molecule [source]. This intercalation might lead to increased access to the nucleotides, possibly leading to even more oxidative damage in the DNA. Amino acids can also covalently bind to DCBQ. The amino acids undergo nucleophilic substitution with both DCBQ and DCBQ-OH, the product of DCBQ hydrolysis.

Proteins can be bound by DCBQ covalently via cysteine or lysine residues. Catechins, which are naturally present in for instance green tea, can competitively bind to DCBQ, reducing the amount of proteins bound to DCBQ [16]. The proteins are covalently modified when bound to DCBQ, which might change the stability and alter the function of the protein.

=== Reversing the mechanism ===
The antioxidant N-acetyl-L-cysteine (NAC) is known to significantly reduce the cytotoxicity induced by DCBQ. NAC is a precursor of sulfhydryl-containing tripeptide glutathione (GSH), which is produced and kept at high levels in all cells, helping them defend against oxidative stress. Once NAC is inside the cell, it is rapidly hydrolyzed to cysteine so that it can be used to form GSH. Restoring the high GSH levels in the cell. NAC is available in oral, inhalation, and intravenous (IV) formulations.

== Efficacy and side effects ==
=== Efficacy ===
2,6-Dichloro-1,4-benzoquinone is primarily used in research due to its ability to participate in electron transfer reactions. In photosynthesis, it can act as an artificial electron acceptor in photosystem II. Researchers can measure and analyse electron transport activity in chloroplasts and other photosynthetic systems. The ability to accept electrons in place of natural quinones makes the compound useful for investigating the mechanisms of photosynthetic energy conversion and for evaluating the effects of inhibitors or environmental stress on photosynthetic organisms.

In addition, 2,6-DCBQ can inhibit enzymes such as acetylcholinesterase in laboratory experiments and may exhibit antimicrobial or algal toxicity due to its reactive quinone structure. These characteristics are mainly of research interest rather than therapeutic application.

=== Side effects ===
Despite its usefulness in experimental studies, 2,6-DCBQ is considered a highly toxic compound, especially as an environmental contaminant formed during the chlorination of drinking water. The primary reason for its toxicity is the generation of reactive oxygen species (ROS), which leads to oxidative stress in cells. This oxidative stress can damage proteins, lipids, DNA, and can also disrupt mitochondrial function, reducing cellular energy production and promoting apoptosis.

Exposure to 2,6-DCBQ has been linked to several adverse biological effects. These include neurotoxicity, where the neuronal cell survival and differentiation is impaired, as well as genotoxic effects such as DNA damage and activation of cell-cycle control pathways. Studies in animals have also shown potential kidney damage and inflammatory responses in tissues. Due to its harmful side effects and its presence as a disinfection by-product, 2,6-DCBQ is considered a compound of concern in environmental and toxicological research.

== Toxicological data ==
The toxicological effects of 2,6‑dichloro‑1,4‑benzoquinone (2,6‑DCBQ) have been investigated in several experimental models. In mice, a 28‑day exposure study reported renal injury following 2,6‑DCBQ exposure. Proposed mechanisms include the activation of inflammatory pathways, oxidative stress, and apoptosis. Toxicity has also been examined in embryonic zebrafish, where exposure resulted in acute and developmental toxicity. Observed effects included impaired cardiovascular development and alterations in molecular signaling pathways.

Studies using human cell lines have also reported cytotoxic effects. In kidney cells, exposure primarily induces anoikis, a form of apoptosis associated with loss of cell–matrix interactions. In human colon epithelial and liver cells, 2,6‑DCBQ exposure increases the production of reactive oxygen species (ROS). Prolonged low‑dose exposure in normal colon and liver cell lines has been associated with oxidative stress, DNA damage, and molecular changes that may indicate a potential role in carcinogenesis. In cell culture systems, the half‑life of 2,6‑DCBQ has been estimated to be less than one hour, and the parent compound appears to exhibit greater cytotoxicity than its transformation product.
