= Kabbah (surname) =

Kabbah or Kabba is a common surname among the Mandinka people of West Africa. Notable people with the surname include:

- Ahmad Tejan Kabbah, Former president of Sierra Leone
- Haja Afsatu Kabba, Sierra Leone's minister of Energy and Power
