= Mohamed Sanusi Tejan =

Sierra Leonean preacher (1950–2016)

Islamic cleric Mohamed Sanusi Tejan

Personal life
- Born: January 19, 1950 Freetown, Sierra Leone
- Died: August 17, 2016 Freetown, Sierra Leone
- Main interest(s): Quran, Hadith, Islamic Jurisprudence
- Occupation: Imam, Islamic Scholar; Islamic Instructor

Religious life
- Religion: Islam
- Denomination: Sunni
- Jurisprudence: Maliki

Muslim leader
- Disciple of: Sulaiman Alpha Carew

Sheikh Alhaji Mohamed Sanusi Tejan (January 19, 1950 – August 17, 2016) was a revered Sierra Leonean Oku Sunni Muslim preacher, Islamic scholar, Islamic theologist, architect, and the former Chief Imam of the Jamiatul Atiq Masjid.

Sheikh Sanusi Tejan was one of the most highly influential and one of the most highly knowledgeable Muslim Scholars in Sierra Leone. He was highly knowledgeable of the Quran, the Hadith of Muhammad, and Islamic Jurisprudence, primarily the Maliki jurisprudence of Sunni Islam. He traveled extensively across Sierra Leone preaching about the Quran and the Sunnah of Muhammad.

Sheikh Sanusi Tejan was the Chief Imam of the Fourah Bay Mosque from 1996 until his death on August 17, 2016. Sheikh Sanusi Tejan was the Muezzin of the Fourah Bay Mosque from 1989 until 1996, when he became the Chief imam. He gave Islamic lectures as special guess in several mosque and many Muslim occasions across Sierra Leone. He appeared on Radio and television preaching the teachings of Islam.

He was also an architect and he was a long term employee of the Sierra Leone Ministry of Works in the 1970s and 1980s during Siaka Stevens and Joseph Saidu Momoh presidencies. However, he later resigned so to concentrate entirely on preaching and spreading the teaching of Islam.

He was the most senior teacher at the prestigious Fourah Bay Madrassa Islamic school, a school he himself attended under the teachings and guidian of the highly influential Salafi Sheikh Alpha Sulaiman Carew. Sheikh Sanusi Tejan began studying the Quran at the Age of two, and he memorized the entire Quran at the age of twelve.

Sheikh Sanusi Tejan was born and raised in a deeply conservative religious Muslim family from the Oku community in Fourah Bay, a conservative Muslim neighborhood of Yoruba descent in Freetown, Sierra Leone. His father Alpha Abdul Karim Tejan was a Muslim Scholar himself.

For secular education, Sheikh Sanusi Tejan attended the Tower Hill Municipal Primary school in Freetown and the Methodist Boys High School also in Freetown.

When Sanusi Tejan died im August 2017, his funeral service was attended by many of Sierra Leone"s Islamic preachers, civil servants and politicians, including then opposition leader Julius Maada Bio, the current President of Sierra Leone.
