= Abdul Tejan-Cole =

Abdul Tejan-Cole is a Sierra Leonean Oku legal practitioner and former Commissioner of Sierra Leone's Anti-Corruption Commission. He was awarded the 2001 Human Rights Watch award.

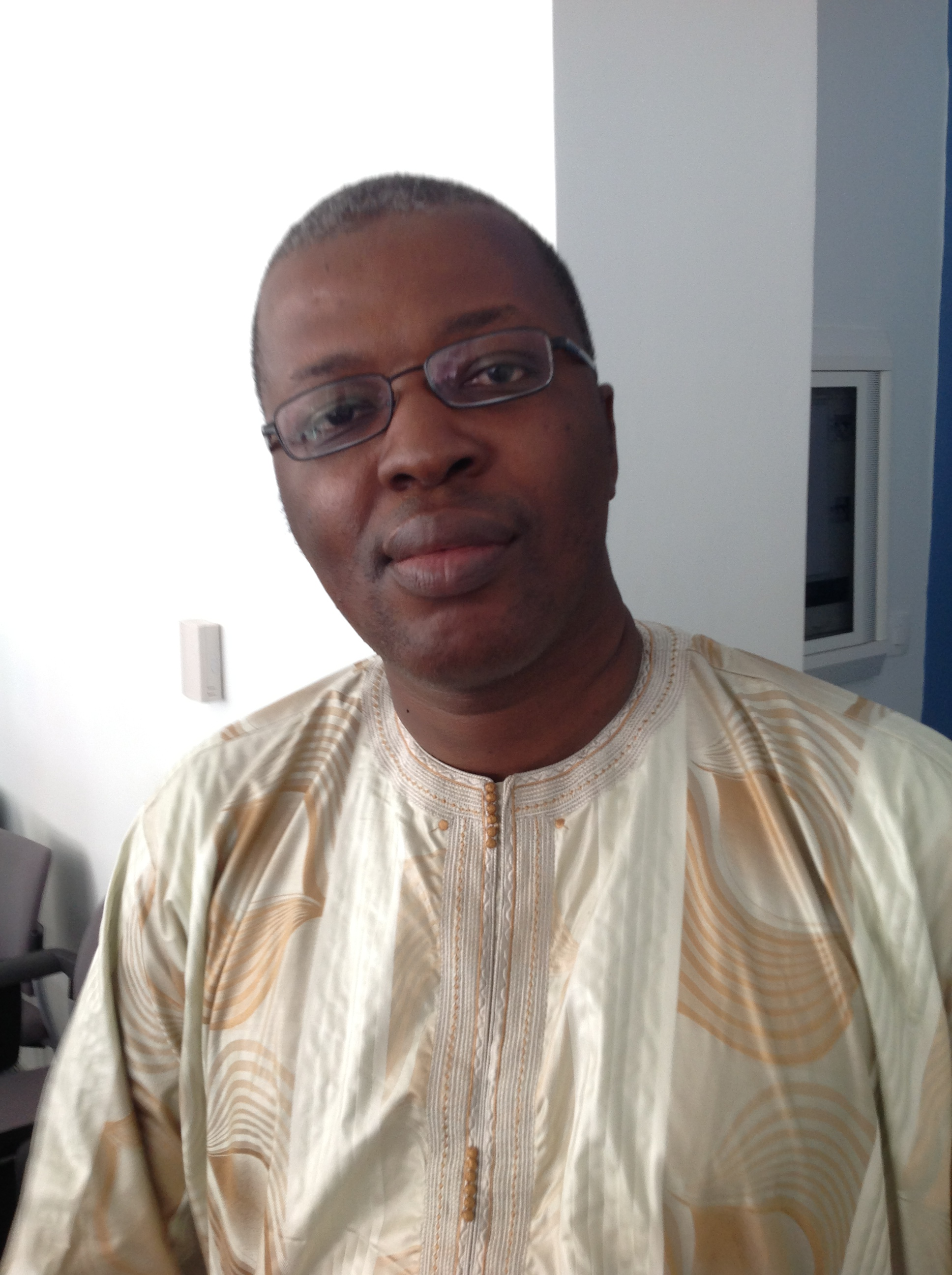
Abdul Tejan-Cole

== Biography ==
Tejan-Cole holds a Bachelor of Laws (Hons) degree from Fourah Bay College, University of Sierra Leone, a Master of Laws from University College London and a post-graduate diploma in International Trade Law from the European University Institute. He was awarded a Teaching Fellowship in Human Rights at Columbia University in New York, in addition to a Yale World Fellowship.

He worked as a trial attorney and appellate counsel in the Special Court for Sierra Leone and taught law at Fourah Bay College, University of Sierra Leone. He was the Deputy Director at the International Center for Transitional Justice’s (ICTJ) Cape Town Office and worked as Adviser and Component Manager Law Justice and Human Rights - Justice Sector Development Programme. He served as Secretary General of the Sierra Leone Bar Association, and later as Vice President and then as President. He was Board Chair of the Open Society Initiative for West Africa (OSIWA) (2002–07) and is former Chair of West Africa Democracy Radio (WADR) and a board member of the Open Society Justice Initiative (OSJI), Timap for Justice, and West Africa Civil Society Institute. He was appointed Commissioner of the Anti Corruption Commission in December 2007 and resigned in 2010.

He served as the Executive Director of the Open Society Initiative for West Africa from 2011 until Feb 6th, 2018.

Tejan-Cole started playing cricket back at the Prince of Wales Secondary School and was later selected to the Sierra Leone national cricket team, where he remained until his retirement. He currently owns a junior club in Sierra Leone, called the Abdul Tejan-Cole Cricket Team, which is an affiliate of the Cricket Sierra Leone (SLCA).
