= Collins O. Bright =

Sierra Leonean diplomat (1917–??)

Chargé d'affaires of Sierra Leone to Egypt
- In office 1969–1970
- Preceded by: Gibril Sesay
- Succeeded by: Gibril Sesay; Kemoh Fadika

Sierra Leonean Ambassador to the United States of Sierra Leone to United States
- In office 22 April 1971 – 22 July 1971
- Preceded by: John Akar
- Succeeded by: Jacob Arthur Christian Davies

Personal details
- Born: 11 February 1917

Collins Oluwole Bright (born 11 February 1917) was a Sierra Leonean diplomat.

== Career ==
- In 1963, he was commercial attaché in the Sierra Leonean High Commission at 178 Broad Street in Lagos, Nigeria.
- From 1969 to 1970, he was Chargé d'affaires in Cairo.
- From 22 April to 22 July 1971, he was Chargé d'affaires in Washington, United States.
- In 1972, he was Counsellor at the Permanent Mission to the Headquarters of the United Nations.
- On 29 March 1974, he was director of the political division in the foreign ministry of Sierra Leone and member of the Government of Sierra Leone Delegation to the special session of the United Nations General Assembly.
- From 27 February 1975 until 1981, he got Exequatur as acting consul general for the United States in New York.
