= Olumbe Bassir =

Nigerian scientist, author, and academic

- Born: 1919; Senegal
- Died: 2001 (aged 81–82)

Olumbe Bassir (1919–2001) was a Nigerian scientist, author and academic. His primary contributions to research were in the areas of aflatoxins, nutrition, and peace research.

== Early life and education ==
Born in Senegal to Sierra Leonean Aku parents In 1919 , Olumbe Bassir was raised in Fourah Bay area, in the municipality of Freetown, by his parents Abdul and Isatu Bassir. He attended the Prince of Wales Secondary School where he passed the Senior Cambridge examination with exemption from London matriculation. In 1946, after a short teaching spell at the prestigious Bo Government Secondary School, he attended to Yaba College where he obtained the Higher National Diploma. He then went to the United Kingdom, where he earned the Bachelor of Science degree in 1949 and PhD in 1951 from Liverpool University.

== Career ==
He spent most of his professional career at the University of Ibadan, where he founded the Biochemistry and Microbiology departments. He laid the foundation of what became the first medical school in West Africa. By 1958, he was already a full professor. His academic specialty was nutrition and biochemical toxicology. He was at various times Head of those two departments, Dean of faculty and also served as acting Vice Chancellor.

He had written at least 250 professional papers by 1972 when University of London conferred the doctor of science degree (D.Sc.) on him. He had performed very successful lecture tours in the then Soviet Union, the United Kingdom, and the United States of America among others.

Olumbe Bassir was the author of several books. His 1957 book Anthology of West African Verse was seminal in introducing written African poetry to Western audiences. His other popular books include Handbook of Practical Biochemistry (1963) and Metabolism of Afflatoxins and other Mycotoxins (1989).

In 1968, he formed a partnership with Richard Tecwyn Williams through the British Inter-University Council for Higher Education Overseas. The programmer's research division helped develop the Drug Metabolism and Biochemical Toxicology research program at Ibadan and contributed in fostering interest and making interesting findings in animal nutritional habits.

After retiring from the University of Ibadan, he remained active for several years, continuing to act as editor of the West African Journal of Biology and Applied Chemistry. He also served as chairman of the Welcome Nigeria Fund, which became the Bassir-Thomas Biomedical Foundation in the early 1990s. He also regularly organised the annual Open House Colloquim.

== Advocacy and activism ==
Olumbe Bassir was a lifelong advocate for peace, and was an active member of the Pugwash Conferences on Science and World Affairs. He also contributed to the Universities and the Quest for Peace. Bassir was a member of the World Association of World Federalists. He was a lifelong member of the Fabian Society which he joined during his student days in England. While in England he was a member of the West African Student Union, and was at some point the editor of its newsletter. He founded the Association of University Teachers in Nigeria which later became the Academic Staff Union of Universities. Despite being non-partisan, he helped develop the manifesto of the Action Group.

== Personal life ==
His name "Olumbe" means "God exists" in Yoruba. He was a Quaker. He married Constance while in the UK and Oyebola while in Nigeria. He had 10 children and the first two(Iyabo& Akinola Bassir) was from his Nigerian Wife Oyobola. In 2000, he suffered a blood clot in the brain due to a traumatic injury to the head. Despite successful surgery and recuperation he died on May 23, 2001, and was buried in his house at Ibadan on July 7, 2001.

== Selected publications ==
- 1979 - Effect of glyphosate on rat liver mitochondriain vivo.
- 1979 - The uncoupling effect of N-(phosphonomethyl) glycine on isolated rat liver mitochondria.
- 1978 - Hepatocarcinogens in Nigerian foodstuffs.
- 1978 - Occurrence of nitrate, nitrite, dimethylamine, and dimethylnitrosamine in some fermented Nigerian beverages.
- 1976 - Effect of cooking on the vitamin C content of fresh leaves and wilted leaves.
- 1970 - Oxidative metabolism of aflatoxin B1 by mammalian liver slices and microsomes.
- 1979 - The uncoupling effect of N-(phosphonomethyl) glycine on isolated rat liver mitochondria.
- 1957 - An Anthology of West African Verse. Ibadan University Press.
- 1973 The effects of aflatoxin B 1 and palmotoxins B 0 and G 0 on the germination and leaf colour of the cowpea (Vigna sinensis).
- 1958 Nutritional studies on breast milk of Nigerian women.(Changes in the major constituents of breast milk during a single feed).
- 1972 Production of aflatoxin B 1 from defined natural cultures of Aspergillus flavus (Link).
