= Xenobiotic metabolism =

Metabolism of xenobiotics

Xenobiotic metabolism: biotransformation and biological fate

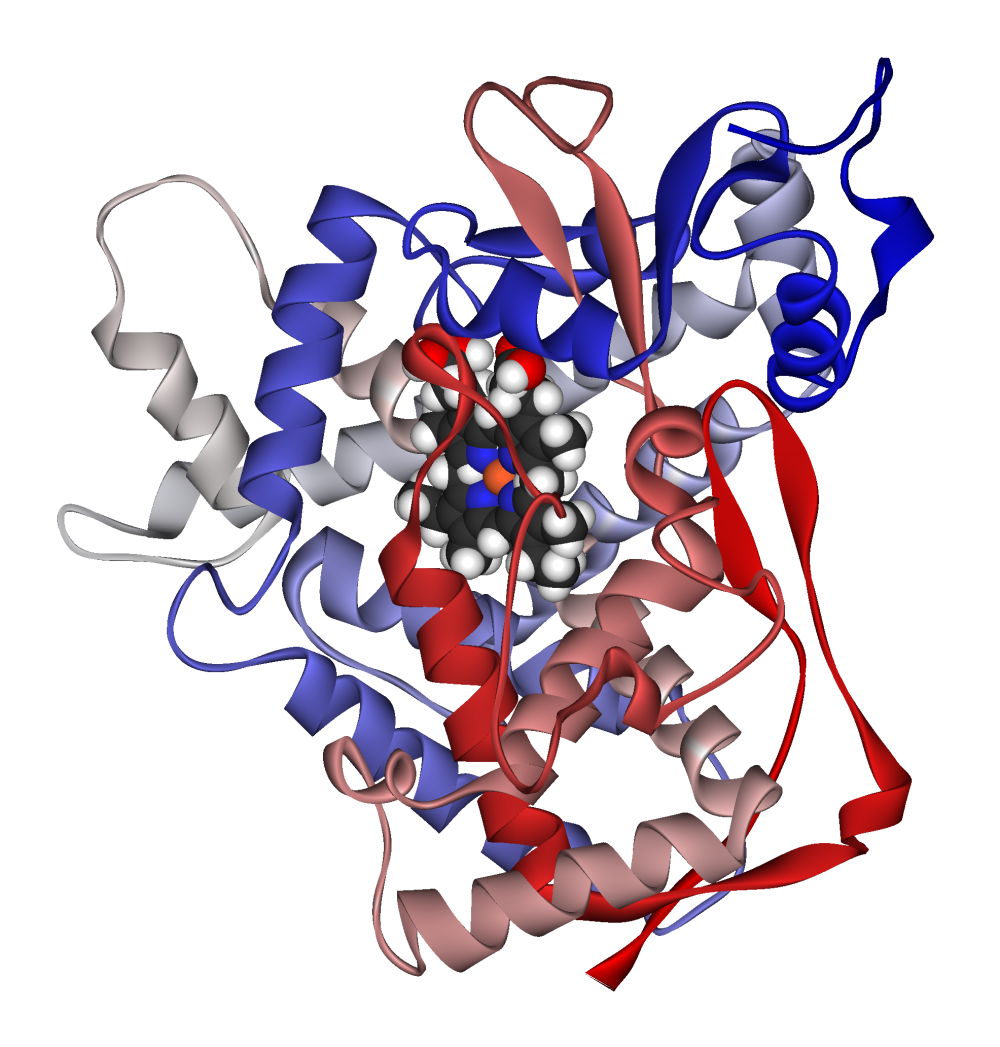
Cytochrome P450 oxidases are important enzymes in xenobiotic metabolism.

Xenobiotic metabolism (from the Greek xenos "stranger" and biotic "related to living beings") is the set of metabolic pathways that modify the chemical structure of xenobiotics, which are compounds foreign to an organism's normal biochemistry, such as drugs and poisons. These pathways are a form of biotransformation present in all major groups of organisms, and are considered to be of ancient origin. These reactions often act to detoxify poisonous compounds; however, in cases such as in the metabolism of alcohol, the intermediates in xenobiotic metabolism can themselves be the cause of toxic effects.

Xenobiotic metabolism is divided into three phases. In phase I, enzymes such as cytochrome P450 oxidases introduce reactive or polar groups into xenobiotics. These modified compounds are then conjugated to polar compounds in phase II reactions. These reactions are catalysed by transferase enzymes such as glutathione S-transferases. Finally, in phase III, the conjugated xenobiotics may be further processed, before being recognised by efflux transporters and pumped out of cells.

The reactions in these pathways are of particular interest in medicine as part of drug metabolism and as a factor contributing to multidrug resistance in infectious diseases and cancer chemotherapy. The actions of some drugs as substrates or inhibitors of enzymes involved in xenobiotic metabolism are a common reason for hazardous drug interactions. These pathways are also important in environmental science, with the xenobiotic metabolism of microorganisms determining whether a pollutant will be broken down during bioremediation, or persist in the environment. The enzymes of xenobiotic metabolism, particularly the glutathione S-transferases are also important in agriculture, since they may produce resistance to pesticides and herbicides.

== Permeability barriers and detoxification ==
That the exact compounds an organism is exposed to will be largely unpredictable, and may differ widely over time, is a major characteristic of xenobiotic toxic stress. The major challenge faced by xenobiotic detoxification systems is that they must be able to remove the almost-limitless number of xenobiotic compounds from the complex mixture of chemicals involved in normal metabolism. The solution that has evolved to address this problem is an elegant combination of physical barriers and low-specificity enzymatic systems.

All organisms use cell membranes as hydrophobic permeability barriers to control access to their internal environment. Polar compounds cannot diffuse across these cell membranes, and the uptake of useful molecules is mediated through transport proteins that specifically select substrates from the extracellular mixture. This selective uptake means that most hydrophilic molecules cannot enter cells, since they are not recognised by any specific transporters. In contrast, the diffusion of hydrophobic compounds across these barriers cannot be controlled, and organisms, therefore, cannot exclude lipid-soluble xenobiotics using membrane barriers.

However, the existence of a permeability barrier means that organisms were able to evolve detoxification systems that exploit the hydrophobicity common to membrane-permeable xenobiotics. These systems therefore solve the specificity problem by possessing such broad substrate specificities that they metabolise almost any non-polar compound. Useful metabolites are excluded since they are polar, and in general contain one or more charged groups.

The detoxification of the reactive by-products of normal metabolism cannot be achieved by the systems outlined above, because these species are derived from normal cellular constituents and usually share their polar characteristics. However, since these compounds are few in number, specific enzymes can recognize and remove them. Examples of these specific detoxification systems are the glyoxalase system, which removes the reactive aldehyde methylglyoxal, and the various antioxidant systems that eliminate reactive oxygen species.

== Phases of detoxification ==
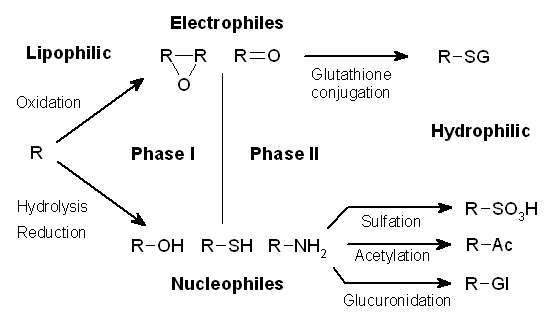
Phases I and II of the metabolism of a lipophilic xenobiotic.

The metabolism of xenobiotics is often divided into three phases: modification, conjugation, and excretion. These reactions act in concert to detoxify xenobiotics and remove them from cells. For some chemicals, they may instead lead to an increase in toxicity (toxication).

=== Phase I - modification ===
In phase I, a variety of enzymes acts to introduce reactive and polar groups into their substrates. One of the most common modifications is hydroxylation catalysed by the cytochrome P-450-dependent mixed-function oxidase system. These enzyme complexes act to incorporate an atom of oxygen into nonactivated hydrocarbons, which can result in either the introduction of hydroxyl groups or N-, O- and S-dealkylation of substrates. The reaction mechanism of the P-450 oxidases proceeds through the reduction of cytochrome-bound oxygen and the generation of a highly-reactive oxyferryl species, according to the following scheme:

$\mbox{NADPH} + \mbox{H}^+ + \mbox{RH} \rightarrow \mbox{NADP}^+ + \mbox{H}_2\mbox{O} +\mbox{ROH} \,$

=== Phase II - conjugation ===
In subsequent phase II reactions, these activated xenobiotic metabolites are conjugated with charged species such as glutathione (GSH), sulfate, glycine, or glucuronic acid. These reactions are catalysed by a large group of broad-specificity transferases, which in combination can metabolise almost any hydrophobic compound that contains nucleophilic or electrophilic groups. One of the most important of these groups are the glutathione S-transferases (GSTs). The addition of large anionic groups (such as GSH) detoxifies reactive electrophiles and produces more polar metabolites that cannot diffuse across membranes, and may, therefore, be actively transported.

=== Phase III - further modification and excretion ===
After phase II reactions, the xenobiotic conjugates may be further metabolised. A common example is the processing of glutathione conjugates to acetylcysteine (mercapturic acid) conjugates. Here, the γ-glutamate and glycine residues in the glutathione molecule are removed by Gamma-glutamyl transpeptidase and dipeptidases. In the final step, the cystine residue in the conjugate is acetylated.

Conjugates and their metabolites can be excreted from cells in phase III of their metabolism, with the anionic groups acting as affinity tags for a variety of membrane transporters of the multidrug resistance protein (MRP) family. These proteins are members of the family of ATP-binding cassette transporters and can catalyse the ATP-dependent transport of a huge variety of hydrophobic anions, and thus act to remove phase II products to the extracellular medium, where they may be further metabolised or excreted.

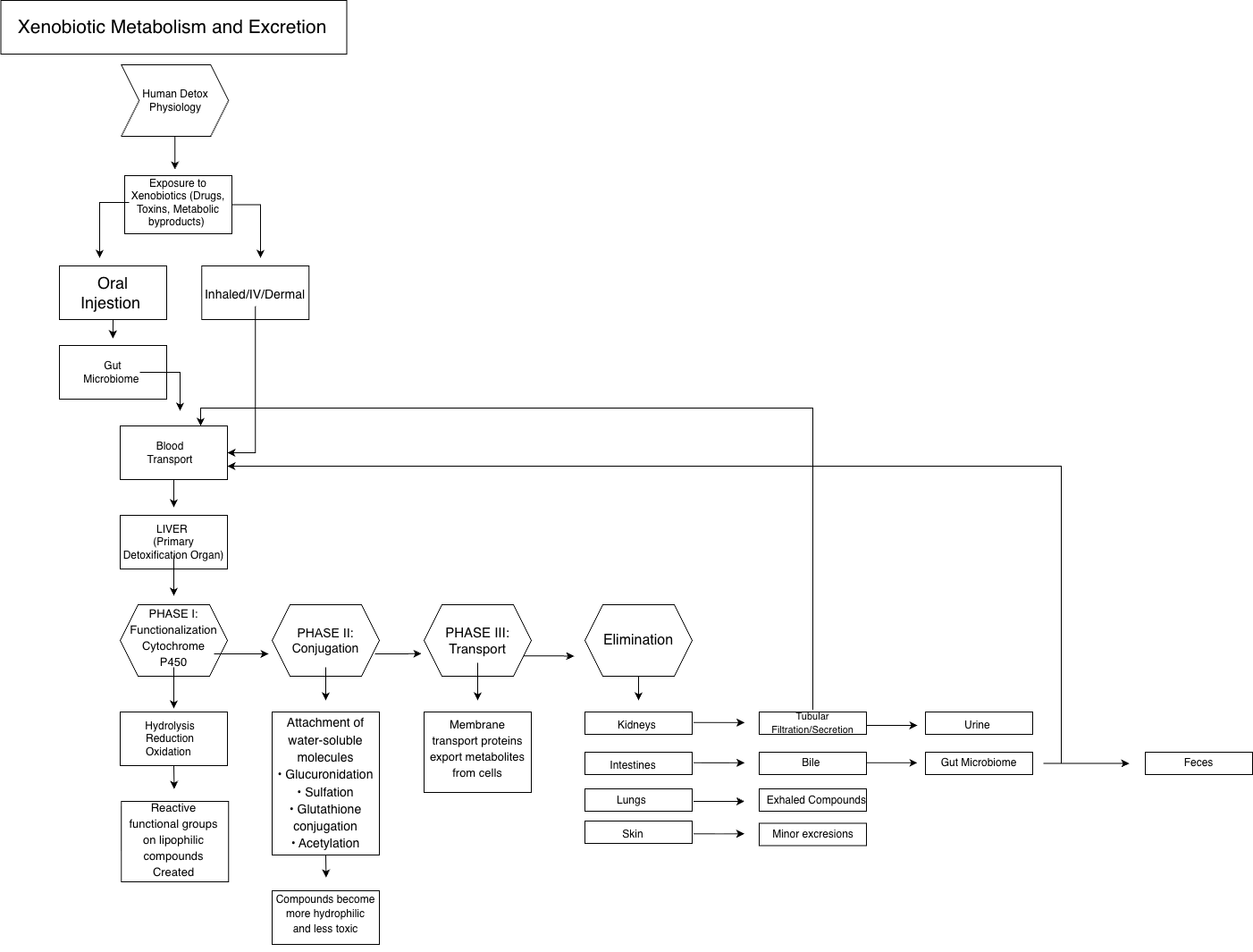
Xenobiotic Metabolism and Excretion

In popular health and wellness trends, the term "detoxification" or "detox" is often used in reference to special diets, supplements, or products that claim to remove toxins from the body. However, the body already removes harmful substances naturally. Organs such as the liver, kidneys, gastrointestinal tract, lungs, and skin work together to get rid of chemicals and waste. Scientific reviews have found limited evidence supporting the effectiveness of commercial "detox" diets or cleansing regimens, because the body's systems do this work every day.

The diagram shows a simplified version of the physiological process of metabolism and excretion.

Xenobiotic exposure can occur in different ways through different routes. Orally ingested compounds first pass through the gastrointestinal tract and gut microbiome where some xenobiotics can be metabolized before entering the bloodstream, while inhaled, intravenous, or dermal exposures enter circulation more directly.

In the bloodstream, xenobiotics are transported to the liver, which acts as the primary site of metabolic detoxification. In hepatocytes, compounds undergo enzymatic transformation in two main phases: Phase I reactions (often mediated by cytochrome P450 enzymes) introduce functional groups, and Phase II reactions conjugate these compounds to increase water solubility and facilitate elimination.

In Phase III, metabolites are transported and excreted from the body. The kidneys eliminate many substances in urine, while others are secreted into bile and excreted in feces after intestinal processing. Minor elimination pathways include exhalation through the lungs and limited excretion via the skin.

== Endogenous toxins ==
Endogenous reactive metabolites, such as peroxides, reactive oxygen species and reactive aldehydes, arise continuously from normal cellular metabolism and can damage proteins, lipids and nucleic acids if not controlled. Their detoxification involves both broad-spectrum and specialized enzymatic systems, including families that act on reactive carbonyls and other electrophiles, as well as dedicated pathways for particularly toxic intermediates. The glyoxalase system, consisting of glyoxalase I and II, uses glutathione to convert the reactive dicarbonyl methylglyoxal, a by-product of glycolysis, into D‑lactate. Antioxidant defence systems, including superoxide dismutases, catalase, peroxiredoxins and glutathione peroxidases, convert reactive oxygen species such as superoxide and hydrogen peroxide into less reactive products, and low-molecular-mass antioxidants such as glutathione, ascorbate and tocopherols further limit oxidative chain reactions. Together, these mechanisms maintain redox homeostasis and restrict the toxic effects of endogenous reactive metabolites.

== History ==
Studies on how people transform the substances that they ingest began in the mid-nineteenth century, with chemists discovering that organic chemicals such as benzaldehyde could be oxidized and conjugated to amino acids in the human body. During the remainder of the nineteenth century, several other basic detoxification reactions were discovered, such as methylation, acetylation, and sulfonation.

In the early twentieth century, work moved on to the investigation of the enzymes and pathways that were responsible for the production of these metabolites. This field became defined as a separate area of study with the publication by Richard Williams of the book Detoxication mechanisms in 1947. This modern biochemical research resulted in the identification of glutathione S-transferases in 1961, followed by the discovery of cytochrome P450s in 1962, and the realization of their central role in xenobiotic metabolism in 1963.

== See also ==
- Drug design
- Drug metabolism
- Microbial biodegradation
- Biodegradation
- Bioremediation
- Antioxidant
- SPORCalc, an example process for exploring xenobiotic and drug metabolism databases
