= Richard Tecwyn Williams =

Welsh biochemist (1909–1979)

Richard Tecwyn Williams FRS
- Born: 20 February 1909; Abertillery, Wales
- Died: 29 December 1979 (aged 70); Northwick Park Hospital
- Education: University College, Cardiff
- Spouse: Josephine Teresa Sullivan
- Children: 5
- Scientific career
- Fields: Xenobiotic metabolism
- Workplaces: University College, Cardiff; University of Birmingham; University of Liverpool; St Mary's Hospital Medical School; University of Ibadan
- Doctoral advisor: Dr John Pryde

Richard Tecwyn Williams FRS (20 February 1909 – 29 December 1979) was a Welsh biochemist who founded the systematic study of xenobiotic metabolism with the publication of his book Detoxication mechanisms in 1947. This seminal book built on his earlier work on the role of glucuronic acid in the metabolism of borneol.

== Biography ==
Williams was born in Abertillery, Wales, the first of five children of Richard Williams, a coalminer, and Mary Ellen (née Jones), a teacher. He grew up speaking Welsh and English. His initial schooling was at Gelli Crug Junior School, from where he gained a scholarship to Abertillery County School. This was followed by University College, Cardiff where he studied chemistry and physiology, and was awarded a BSc in 1928.

An opportunity arose for Williams to undertake research with Dr John Pryde at the Physiology Institute, Cardiff, where he worked on elucidating the structure of glucuronic acid. This work formed part of his PhD thesis; he was awarded the degree in 1932. After postdoctoral research at Cardiff he was appointed Lecturer in Biochemistry at the University of Birmingham in 1934. Here, Williams further developed his ideas concerning the metabolism of foreign compounds. His 1938 paper on detoxication of phenol in the rabbit proved to be the first in a series, culminating in Part 77 twenty years later. He was awarded a DSc at Birmingham in 1939.

In 1942, Williams was appointed Senior Lecturer in Biochemistry in the University of Liverpool. He expanded his researches, aided by postdoctoral students and collaborators. One study, supported by the MRC, was into the metabolism of TNT, which revealed the formation of the hydroxylamine derivative, 2,6-dinitro-4-hydroxylaminotoluene, a highly toxic substance, which probably accounted for the toxicity of TNT itself.

In January 1949, aged 39, Tecwyn Williams took up a new appointment, as the first Chair of Biochemistry at St Mary's Hospital Medical School. During this phase of his career he visited the National Institutes of Health as a visiting scientist, where he became interested in spectrophotofluorimetry and the work of Robert Bowman. He returned with a spectrophotofluorimeter, for several years the only one in the UK, and used it for elucidating the relation between chemical structure and fluorescence. His hope that the technique would become widespread and important was not fulfilled: gas chromatography was to become universally much more useful.

Williams had a particular interest in Nigeria and in 1968 a link was established between St Mary's and the Department of Biochemistry, University of Ibadan. The Professor of Biochemistry at Ibadan was Olumbe Bassir a former student of Williams at Liverpool. The two worked with the Inter-University Council for Higher Education Overseas to form the link, which allowed the exchange of teaching staff and the development of joint research programmes, and through which Williams developed an undergraduate teaching programme in drug metabolism. He was awarded a DSc by Ibadan in 1974.

He was elected a Fellow of the Royal Society in March 1967. His application citation read: "The researches of Williams have been largely responsible for laying the foundations of biochemical toxicology. He has worked on the metabolism of aliphatic alcohols, alicyclic hydrocarbons, benzenes and alkylbenzenes, sulphonamides, drugs of a wide variety, heterocycles, and organotin compounds. He is especially known for his work on fluorescence and his studies on thalidomide in which he has shown that none of the twelve breakdown products which he identified is teratogenic. Williams has also defined the structural factors required for a compound to be excreted through the bile. He has discovered species differences which may have an application in primate classification. His work is of immediate relevance to an understanding of drug metabolism and action and that of the biological effects of food additives, pesticides, and other compounds foreign to the body".

=== Family ===
While a research student at Cardiff, Tecwyn Williams met Josephine Teresa Sullivan, who had been apprenticed and indentured as a ladies and gentlemen’s tailor. They married in 1937, and had five children: Peter Sullivan, Richard Stephen Steel, Josephine Mary Johnston, Helen Maria Tecwyn and Marian Clare Gerard.

A portrait of Richard Tecwyn Williams can be found on page 1 of this memoir

He died on 29 December 1979 in Northwick Park Hospital in London.

== Awards ==
- Honorary doctorate from the University of Paris (1966)
- Honorary MD from the University of Tübingen (1972)
- DSc from the University of Wales (1976)
- DSc from the University of Ibadan (1974)
- Elected a Fellow of the Royal Society (1967)
- Merit award of the Society of Toxicology (1968)

== Former students ==
- Dr John Smith - Chair of Biochemistry at the University of Wellington
- Dr Dennis Parke - Professor and head of the Department of Biochemistry, University of Surrey
- Dr Donald Davies - Professor of Biochemical Pharmacology, Royal Postgraduate Medical School
- Dr Donald Robinson - Chair of Biochemistry, Queen Elizabeth College
- Dr Olumbe Bassir - Professor of Biochemistry, University of Ibadan
- Dr Robert Smith - Professor of Biochemical Pharmacology, St Mary’s Hospital Medical School

== Bibliography ==
- Williams, R.T., Detoxication Mechanisms, J.Wiley & Sons, New York, N.Y. (1947)
