= Ramatoulie Othman =

- Born: Banjul, Gambia
- Occupation: Writer, journalist

Ramatoulie Onikepo Othman is a Gambian writer belonging to the Oku Marabout ethnic group.

== Early life ==
She attended elementary and secondary school in Freetown, Sierra Leone. She then continued her education in administration (Secretarial Studies) at the Presentation Girls Vocational School in Banjul.

== Career ==
In the early 1980s she worked as a social worker at the Department of Social Welfare in Banjul and also worked as a reporter. Between 1983 and 1994 she was a freelance journalist for the Nigerian newspapers Daily Times and National Concord. In 1993 she was an actress at the film festival TeleTest of the Nigerian television station Nigerian Television Authority (NTA). Around 1996 she wrote for The Daily Observer.

In 1999, after urging her environment, she published the book, A Cherished Heritage, a scientific study of the history of the Muslim Aku, whose roots she sees in freed slaves and settlers with Freetown and Creole community of Sierra Leone, as well as West Indies on the opposite shore of the Atlantic. The novel Costly Prices (2005) deals with the topics of tourism in Gambia and Gambian bumsters.

From 2010 to 2018 she was treasurer of the Writers' Association of The Gambia (WAG).

In 2023, she was selected for the Ebedi International Writers Residency in Iseyin, Nigeria.

== Works ==
- The Views of an Onlooker, 1991 (compilation of their news articles, published in Nigeria).
- A Cherished Heritage: Tracing the Roots of the Oku Marabout, Serekunda (Gambia), Edward Francis Small Printing Press, 1999.
- Costly Prices, Ahmadiyya Muslim Centenary Press, 2005.
