= Babatunde Lawal =

Nigerian art historian

- Born: Lagos, Nigeria

Babatunde Lawal is an art historian and scholar of the arts of Nigeria. His research is focused on the visual culture of the Yoruba and its influences in the Americas. He is a professor of Art History at Virginia Commonwealth University.

Lawal was born and raised in Isale-Eko (Oju Olokun Street), a district of Lagos. He completed a BA at the University of Nigeria and a PhD in Art History at Indiana University. In 1971, Lawal joined the Institute of African Studies at the University of Ife as a research fellow. He served as Dean of Faculty of Arts at Ife into the 1980s. He joined Virginia Commonwealth University in 1992.

Having been raised in Nigeria himself, Lawal's scholarship uses a theoretical model that draws heavily from first-person accounts of various Nigeria customs and art making practices. This distinguishes him from many European and American scholars of African art.

In his book on Gẹlẹdẹ, Lawal writes: "A number of scholars [...] have called for a new critical approach that will allow African traditions to be studied on their own terms, instead of being viewed through Eurocentric lenses... What is urgently needed, as Henry Gates has pointed out, is a method that enables a given culture 'to speak for itself about its nature and various functions, rather than to read it, or analyse it, in terms of... theories borrowed whole from other traditions, appropriated from without.'"
