= Freetown Central Mosque =

Mosque in Western Area Urban, Sierra Leone

- Location within Sierra Leone

Religion
- Affiliation: Islam
- Ecclesiastical or organizational status: Mosque
- Leadership: Sheikh Ahmad Tejan Sillah (Chief Imam)
- Status: Active

Location
- Location: Freetown
- Country: Sierra Leone
- Interactive map of Freetown Central Mosque
- Coordinates: 8°29′31″N 13°13′58″W

Architecture
- Type: Mosque

The Freetown Central Mosque is a mosque located in Freetown, the capital of Sierra Leone. The mosque also hosts various Islamic cultural events.

== Overview ==
The chief imam of the Freetown Central Mosque is Sheikh Ahmad Tejan Sillah, who is also the spiritual leader of the United Council of Imams in Sierra Leone.

Presidents of Sierra Leone have traditionally made occasional visit to the mosque and attend Muslim prayers, regardless of their religion. Former president Ernest Bai Koroma, who is a Christian, has visited and prayed at the central mosque on several occasions.

== See also ==
- Islam in Sierra Leone
- List of mosques in Sierra Leone
