= Milton Margai College of Education and Technology =

College in Sierra Leone

Coordinates: 8.4228°N 13.2836°W

Milton Margai College of Education and Technology University of Sierra Leone
- Type: Private
- Established: 1963
- Affiliations: University of Sierra Leone
- Students: 8,369
- Location: Freetown, Sierra Leone
- Campus: Goderich campus, Congo Cross campus, Brook field campus
- Website: http://www.mmosa.org/

Milton Margai College of Education and Technology (MMCET), formerly known as Milton Margai Teachers College (MMCET), is a technical university located in Freetown, Sierra Leone. It was established in 1963 and is named after Sierra Leone's first Prime Minister, Sir Milton Margai. The university has become affiliated with the University of Sierra Leone, and has been upgraded to a degree-awarding status in selected subjects.

== History ==
=== Milton Margai Teachers College ===
Milton Margai Teachers College was founded in 1963, and was originally housed at Tower Hill in Freetown. The mission of MMTC was to train teachers for the lower levels of secondary school (Forms 1 - 3).

Until 1967 graduates of MMCET were awarded either a Teacher's Certificate (TC), or a Teacher's Advanced Certificate (TAC). In 1967 a new three-year programme was introduced, the curriculum was restructured, and both the TC and TAC where phased out and replaced with the Higher Teachers Certificate (HTC).

=== Milton Margai College of Education ===
In 1995, in response to the needs of the new 6-3-3-4 system of education, a Bachelor of Education (B.Ed) degree programme was introduced. The 6-3-3-4 system involves six years of primary schooling, three years of junior secondary schooling (JSS), three years of senior secondary schooling (SSS), and four years of tertiary education. The Bachelor of Education degree programme was introduced in the specialist subject areas of Physical and Health education, Performing arts, Practical Arts, Technical Studies, Business Studies, Secretariat Studies, Integrated Science, Indigenous Languages (include the Mende, Temne, Limba and Krio), Community Development Studies, Social Studies and Religious and Moral Education. This significant restructuring of the curriculum meant a change in the depth and breadth of the education offered, and the name was changed to Milton Margai College of Education (MMCET) to reflect this.

=== Milton Margai College of Education and Technology ===
In 2000, Milton Margai College of Education merged with Freetown Technical Institute (FTI) at Congo Cross, and the Hotel and Tourism Training Institute at Brookfields, to become the Milton Margai College of Education and Technology. This latest restructuring transforms the college into a Polytechnic. The programmes at MMCET are divided into four faculties, Education, Engineering (Civil, Electrical, & Mechanical), Science and Technology, and Business and Management, including Hotel and Tourism.

The merger brought about a reconstruction of both staff and student administrative units. Within the staff unit, Dr. Dennis Kargbo was appointed Principal of the MMCET.

== MMCET Programmes ==
- Bachelor of Education
- Bachelor of Technology
- Bachelor of Commerce
- Bachelor of Vocational Studies
- Higher National Diploma
- Higher Teachers Certificate
- Higher National Certificate
- National Diploma
- National Certificate
- National Trade Certificate
- Trade Test Certificate
- IT Diploma
