= Mercapturic acid =

Mercapturic acids are condensation products formed from the coupling of cysteine with aromatic compounds. They are formed as conjugates in the liver and are excreted in the urine.

Mercapturic acids are formed as part of xenobiotic metabolism. A glutathione S-transferase first conjugates the foreign compound to glutathione, forming an adduct. The adduct is then converted to the mercapturic acid: the γ-glutamate and glycine residues in the glutathione molecule are removed by gamma-glutamyl transpeptidase and dipeptidases. In the final step, the cystine residue in the conjugate is acetylated. The mercapturic acid is then excreted.

Levels of mercapturic acids in urine may be used as an indicator of exposure to, e.g., ethylene dibromide, acrylamide, and terbuthylazine.

== Etymology ==
The name mercapturic acid is a combination of mercapturic and acid. The latter indicates that the compound is an acid. The former is a compound word consisting of the stem mercaptur-, coming from mercaptan, and the suffix -ic, meaning "having the character of". In sum, the name mercapturic acid means "an acid with mercaptan character/nature".
