= Timap for Justice =

Timap for Justice is a non-profit that provides free justice services to people in Sierra Leone. It is based on a paralegal model, providing people with access to "education, mediation, negotiation, organizing, and advocacy". The organization is run by Simeon Koroma and Musa Mewa, two lawyers in Freetown. It was founded by Vivek Maru and Simeon Koroma, as a joint-project between the Open Society Justice Initiative (part of George Soros's Open Society Institute) and the National Forum for Human Rights, a Sierra Leonian coalition of human rights organizations. It became an independent organization in 2005, and currently has offices in Freetown and 13 others villages and towns across the country. In 2006, Timap received almost $1M from the World Bank to expand their services to cover more of the country.

Timap attempts to empower the local population by providing a variety of legal services. As described by the Law Society of England and Wales

As previously stated there is a shortage of lawyers within the country especially in rural areas hence the recruitment of paralegals. These professionals are sometimes graduates, former teachers, or both. They are trained in methods of dispute resolution and on the law. The majority of cases are resolved through mediation although a small percentage progress through the local court system. Paralegals in addition to convening mediations, interview witnesses, and individuals against whom complaints are lodged; meet with government and court officials; monitor the progress of cases or investigations; convene community meetings or workshops to address recurring problems; communicate with village, paramount or section chiefs to co-ordinate activities on local concerns and maintain good relations."

Timap was highlighted by former US President Jimmy Carter as a model solution for justice problems. In an article he published in the Harvard International Review, President Carter pointed out that "Timap is widely accepted, but remains an independent organization" and "they are not intended to replace existing justice mechanisms, but they can provide alternatives where people’s trust in local justice—formal or traditional—is low and can set a competitive example by operating in professional and transparent ways that invite comparison and improve overall performance". Transparency International also highlighted Timap's work, describing how an organization "with no statutory authority", with knowledge of the local context and culture, is able to exert enough pressure on people to follow the law.
