= Ahmad Tejan Sillah =

Chief Imam of the Freetown Central Mosque

Spiritual leader of the United Council of Imams in Sierra Leone

Chief imam of the Masjid Fatima Zahra mosque, Freetown
- In office 1982–1985

United Nations Goodwill Ambassador
- Incumbent
- Assumed office 2000

Personal details
- Born: Freetown, Sierra Leone
- Education: Dar al-Tabligh, Qum, Iran
- Profession: Imam, Islamic Preacher

Ahmad Tejan Sillah is a Sierra Leonean Shia Muslim scholar and Islamic preacher. He is the chief imam of the Freetown Central Mosque, one of the largest mosque in Sierra Leone. He is also one of the leaders of the Sierra Leone United Council of Imams, an Islamic organisation that is made up of imams across Sierra Leone. Sillah is one of the most prominent Islamic scholars in Sierra Leone. Sillah is a Shia Muslim of the Twelver branch of Shia Islam

Born and raised in Freetown, Sierra Leone, Sillah received a master's degree in Islamic studies at the Dar Al Tabligh Islamic University in the holy city of Qum in Iran. Sillah is an advocate for child and women's rights to be respected as stated in the Quran. He has often preached against violence in society and violence against women.

During Sierra Leone's civil war, Sillah was one of the leading advocates for peace. He traveled to dangerous rebel held areas of the country to preach to the rebels to lay down their arms and accept peace. In 2000, he was appointed by the United Nations Population Fund (UNFPA) as a Goodwill Ambassador.

Sillah is a founding member of the Inter-Religious Council of Sierra Leone, which is made up of both Muslim and Christian religious leaders.

== Early life and education ==
Ahmad Tejan Sillah was born and raised in Freetown, the capital of Sierra Leone. He is a Shia Muslim cleric. He attended primary and secondary schools in Freetown. In 1974, he received a master's degree in Islamic studies at the Dar al-Tabligh in the holy city of Qum in Iran. He was an Islamic preacher for two years in Iran before returning to Sierra Leone. He is religiously close to Ayatollah Ali Khamenei, the spiritual leader of Iran.

== Activist ==
He has used his own wealth to pay fees for poor students, sponsor students to attend college, and he is an advocate for child and women's rights to be respected as stated in the Quran. He has preached against violence in society and against women. Sillah has preached that most of what exists in a true democratic society had existed in Islam long before democracy itself took place in the Western World.
