= Aberdeen, Sierra Leone =

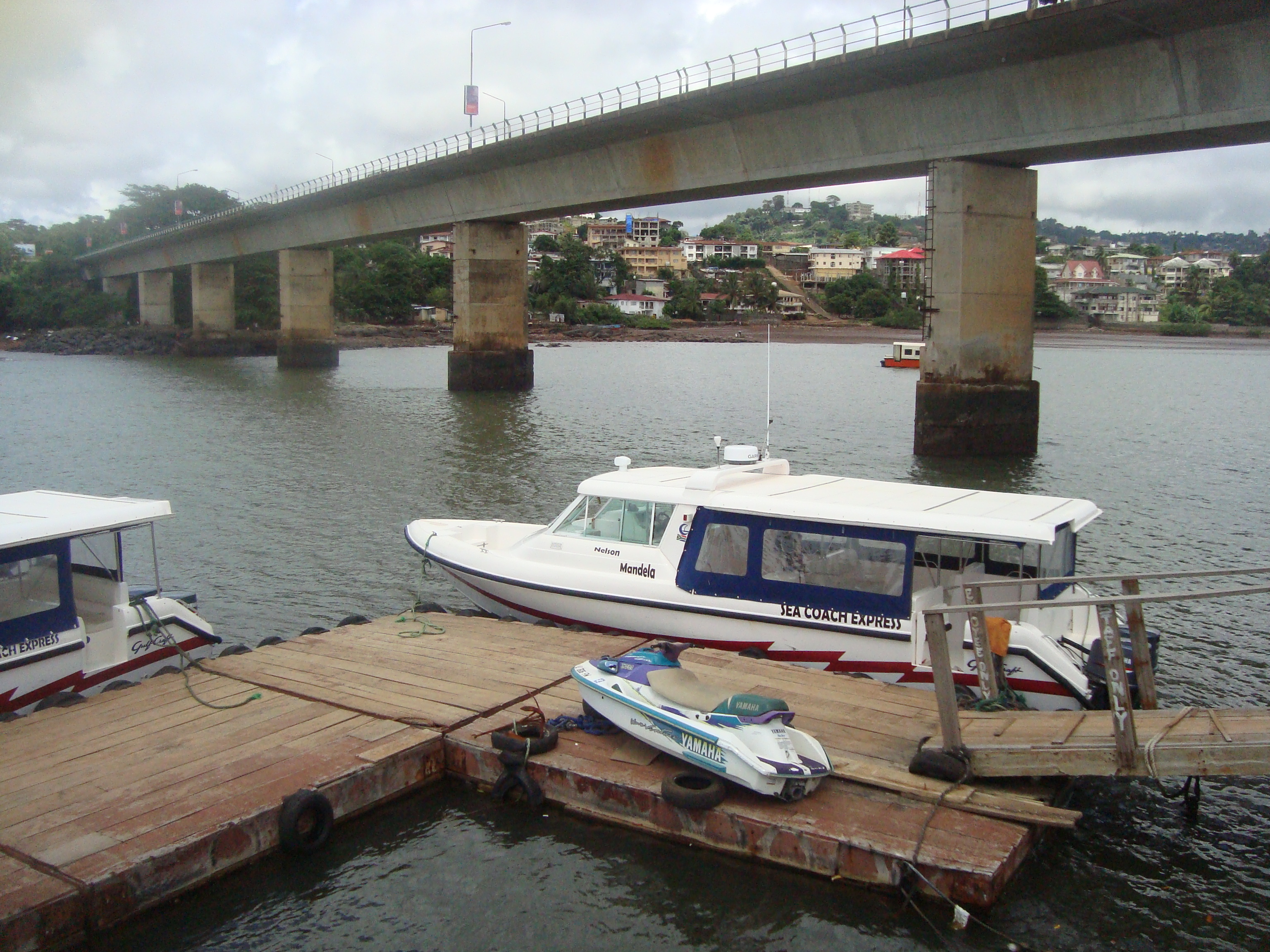

- Location in Sierra Leone
- Coordinates: 8°30′N 13°17′W
- Country: Sierra Leone
- Province: Western Area
- District: Western Area Urban District

Aberdeen is a coastal neighborhood in the northwestern part of Sierra Leone's capital Freetown. It is home to numerous up-scale restaurants, hotels, nightclubs and other tourist facilities. Cape Sierra Leone is located at the northwestern end of the Sierra Leone Peninsula in Aberdeen. The white sandy Aberdeen-Lumley Beach stretches all the way from the cape down to neighbouring Lumley, along the western part of the peninsula.

== History ==
Aberdeen was founded in 1829 to provide accommodation for recaptives, liberated enslaved Africans, who had been brought to Freetown by the British Royal Navy West Africa Squadron.
