= Jamiatul Atiq Mosque =

Mosque in Freetown, Western Area Urban, Sierra Leone

- Location within Sierra Leone

Religion
- Affiliation: Sunni Islam
- Ecclesiastical or organizational status: Mosque
- Leadership: Sheikh Alhaji Hassan Karim (Chief Imam)
- Status: Active

Location
- Location: Freetown
- Country: Sierra Leone
- Interactive map of Jamiatul Atiq Mosque
- Coordinates: 8°29′20.2″N 13°12′52.2″W

Architecture
- Type: Mosque

The Jamiatul Atiq Mosque, also locally known as the Fourah Bay Mosque, is a large mosque located in the Fourah Bay neighborhood of Freetown, in Sierra Leone.

== Overview ==
The mosque regularly holds Islamic prayer services five times a day; and its also teaches Islamic education. The chief Imam of the Jamiatul Atiq Masjid is Chief Sheikh Alhaji Hassan Karim, and the deputy chief Imam is Sheikh Alhaji Nazir King. The mosque is the main mosque that serves the Fourah Bay community, a predominantly conservative Muslim community in Freetown.

The then Minister of Social Welfare, Gender and Children's affairs, Sylvia Blyden, who is a Christian, joined Muslims in prayers at the mosque in celebrating of the 2017 Eid al-Fitr.

== See also ==
- Islam in Sierra Leone
- List of mosques in Africa
