= Haja Afsatu Kabba =

Sierra Leonean Oku politician

Sierra Leone Minister of Energy and Power
- In office 2007–2010
- Preceded by: Moses Moisa-Kapu

Membe of Parliament of Sierra Leone from the Western Area Urban District
- In office 2002–2007

Personal details
- Born: Afsatu Olayinka Ebishola Savage; July 2, 1953 (age 72) Freetown, British Sierra Leone
- Party: All People's Congress (APC)

Haja Afsatu Olayinka Ebishola Savage Kabba is a Sierra Leonean Oku politician and former Sierra Leone minister of Energy and Power. She served as a member of Parliament of Sierra Leone from the Western Area Urban District from 2002 to 2007.

== Early life ==
Haja Afsatu Olayinka Ebishola Savage was born and raised in Freetown, Sierra Leone to Muslim parents from the Oku community, and she is a devout Muslim herself. She completed her primary and secondary education in Freetown. She adopted her husband last name Kabba.

== Political career ==
On 14 May, 2002 Sierra Leone general election, Haja Afsatu Kabba ran for seat in parliament as candidate of the then opposition All People's Congress (APC) from the Western Area Urban District. She won one of four seats in parliament reserve for the Western Area Urban, but her party's presidential candidate Ernest Bai Koroma won only 19.4% of the vote in the presidential election compared to the incumbent President Ahmad Tejan Kabbah of the Sierra Leone People's Party (SLPP) 70%. On October 16, 2007, newly elected Sierra Leone's president Ernest Bai Koroma named Haja Afsatu Kabba as the country's minister of energy and power.
