= Gẹlẹdẹ =

Yoruba artistic public display spectacle

Gelede performing in Western Nigeria

Gelede performing in Benin

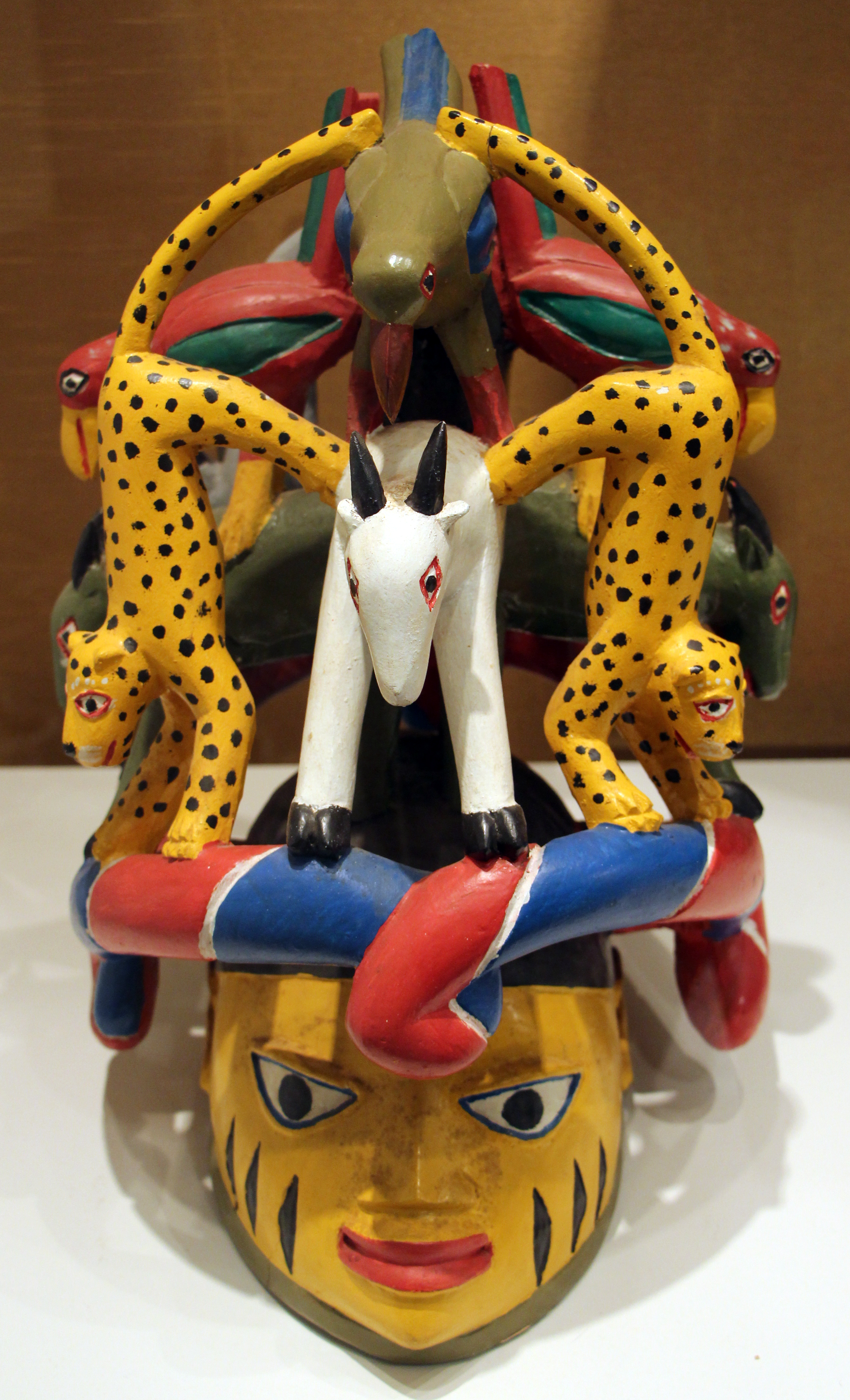
Gelede mask, Afro-Brazilian Museum, São Paulo

The Gẹlẹdẹ spectacle of the Yoruba is a public display by colorful masks which combines art and ritual dance to amuse, educate and inspire worship. Gelede celebrates “Mothers” (awon iya wa), a group that includes female ancestors and deities as well as the elderly women of the community, and the power and spiritual capacity these women have in society. Focusing not only on fertility and motherhood but also on correct social behavior within the Yoruba society.

== Yoruba belief ==
The Gelede social agenda rests on the Yoruba maxim Eso l'aye (The world is fragile). In other words, life is delicate and should be lived with caution and with an emphasis on diplomacy, consideration, respect and harmony.

== Origins ==
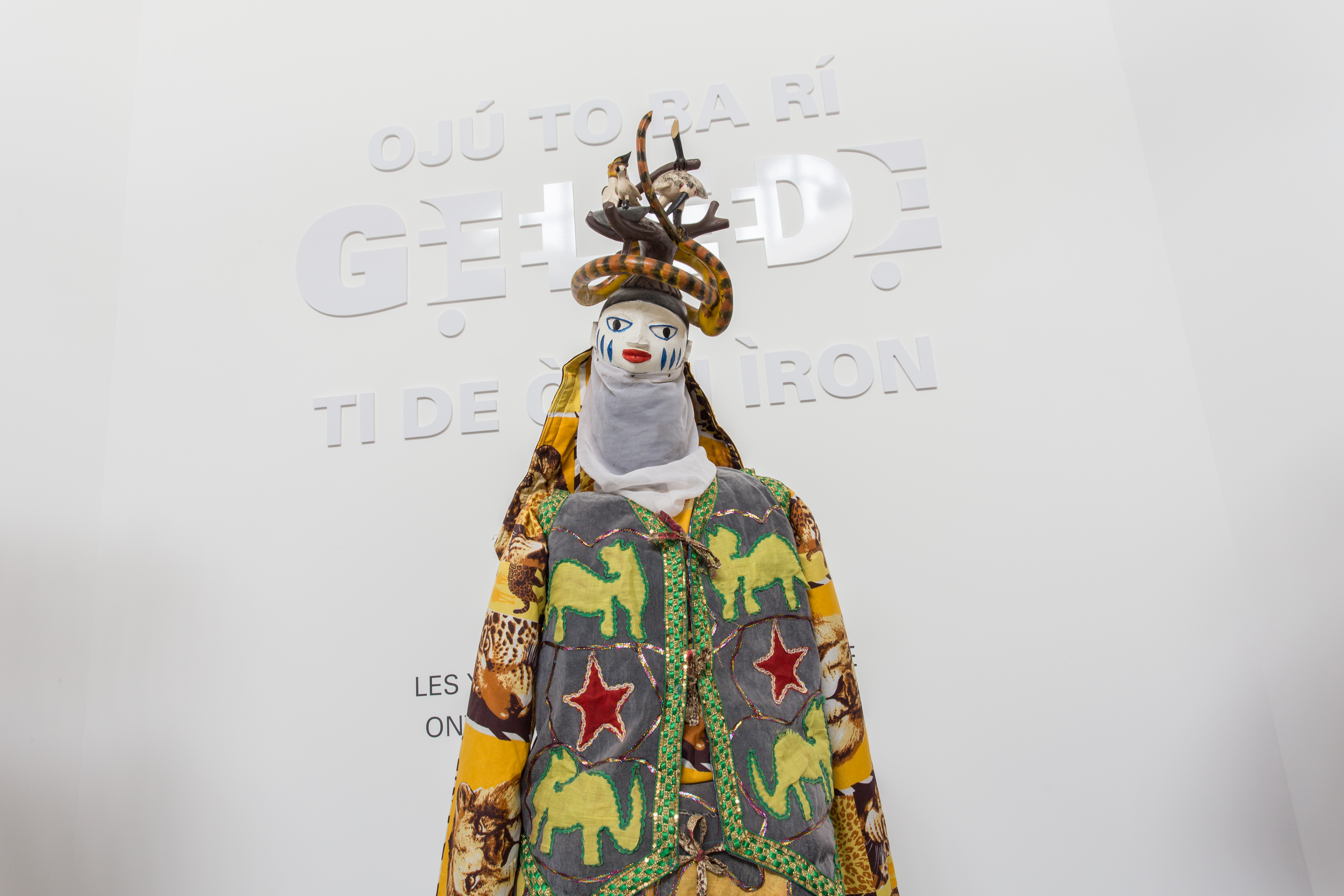
Exhibited gelede at Château Vodou in Strasbourg.

There are two main schools of thought about the origins of Gelede, the historical and the mythological. The historical origins are linked to three possible places, Oyo ile, Ketu, and Ilobi. Ketu, one of the oldest and most elaborate of the Gelede performances has an origin story of a king dying and his two twin sons both vying for the throne. One brother, after learning that he wasn't going to get the throne came up with a plan to kill his twin. When the brother caught wind of the plan he came up with a counter plan that involved creating a mask and a makeshift person as a deception. The mythological origins are directly connected to Iya Nla, or the Great Mother, and her connection to motherhood and twins.

Most Yoruba myths of origin can be found in the divination narratives known as Odu Ifa. There are approximately 256 Odu Ifa, each of which contains a number of poems called ese Ifa. A typical ese Ifa is a narrative about a person or animal with a problem and the steps to resolve that problem. An ese Ifa explains the origins of Gelede as beginning with Yéwájòbí,{Yé Yé awa} "The Mother of all the orisa and all living things." Yewajobi could not have children and consulted an Ifa oracle, who advised her to offer sacrifices and to dance with wooden images on her head and metal anklets on her feet. After performing this ritual, she became pregnant. Her first child was a boy, nicknamed "Efe" (the humorist); the Efe mask emphasizes song and jests because of the personality of its namesake. Yewa's second child was a girl, nicknamed "Gelede" because she was obese like her mother. Also like her mother, Gelede loved dancing.

Gelede performing in Benin

After getting married themselves, neither Gelede nor Efe's partner could have children. The Ifa oracle suggested they try the same ritual that had worked for their mother. No sooner than Efe and Gelede performed these rituals - dancing with wooden images on their heads and metal anklets on their feet - they started having children. These rituals developed into the Gelede masked dance and was perpetuated by the descendants of Efe and Gelede.

This narrative is one of many stories that explains the origin of Gelede. Another theory states that the beginning of Gelede might be associated with the change from a matriarchal to a patriarchal society.

== Gelede Society ==
The Gelede festival promotes social harmony, because of this both men and women are involved within the society. With its connection to Iya Nla, or the Great Mother, the Gelede society has a large number of female members. This is in part because of its connection to motherhood and mothers, but also due to the belief that participation within this society helps in the fertility of the women. Men's participation within the masking performances are similarly linked, as participating in the performances could also increase fertility. Though men are not as concerned with this issue as women are due to the nature of the Yoruba society and women's roles within it.

To be able to perform the various events within the Gelede festival, the Gelede society appoints officials, groups, and professionals to oversee various aspects within the society. Though the titles of these various groups and people vary from community to community the following are the most common:

Iyalase, the Chief Priestess, meaning "mother of the shrine" is the head of this Gelede society. She is the main person of communication between Iya Nla, the community, and the Gelde Society. Iyalase's main function, outside of a point of communication, is being in charge of the Gelede shrine, Ase, where she is the only one allowed to enter.

Babalase, the Chief Priest, meaning "father of the shrine" is the male equivalent of Iyalase. His main function within the Gelede society is the organization of the events for the Gelede festival. In line with being the organizer of the Gelede events, he is the official keeper of the Gelede headdresses and costumes. The Babalase is, in the most general terms, the assistant to Iyalase where he will only be appointed with the approval of Iya Nla and the powerful mothers.

Abore, or the Male Priest, is an older male official that assists people looking for favors form the aje for their rituals. In some communities this position is hereditary and requires a vast amount of knowledge about rituals and worship in the Yoruba society.

Elefe, or the Humorist, is the man who carries the Efe mask for the Gelede festival. It is his job to pray for the well-being of the community and promote non antisocial behaviors while also being the voice of the community. Saying and doing things that outside of this individual would be socially unacceptable. Usually played by a middle aged man or older, he is required to be knowledgeable in the oral literature of the community.

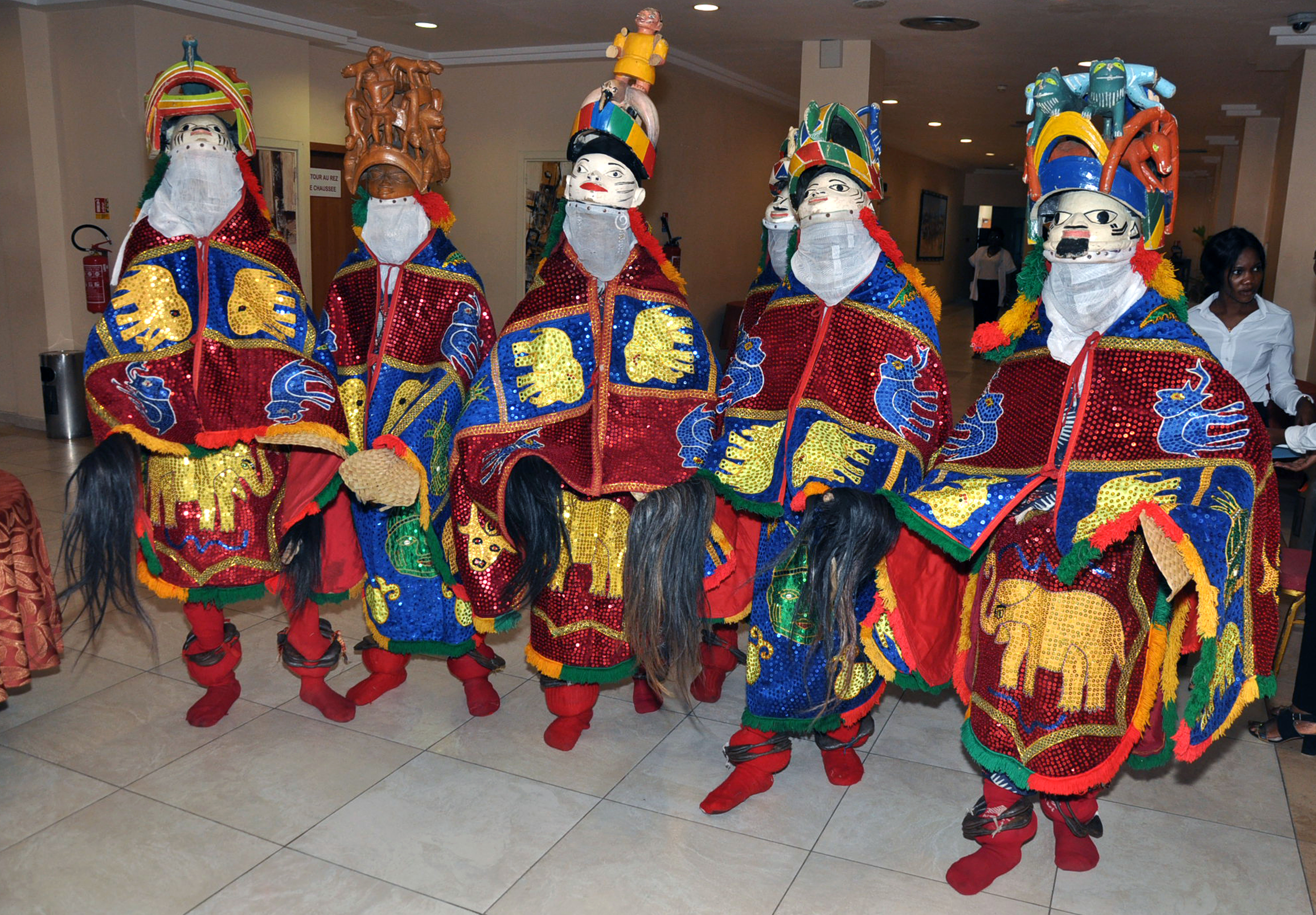
Gelede masquerades

Arugi, or the masker, means "wood carrier". This man must not only be a good dancer but also must be knowledgeable in the popular proverbs and local language to orient himself and understand the language of the drums. The learning of this language usually begins sometime in early childhood when children start learning the various dances. If they appear to have skill those children are then trained and allowed to wear the masks during the annual Gelede festival.

Onilu, or the Drummers, in the case of Gelede are experts in the music of Gelede. Agberin, or the Chorus, is composed of men and women wearing either similar or the same clothing to project the appearance of being a group.

== Spectacle ==
Although the Gelede ceremony may be staged at any time of the year (to better the lot of an individual, to cleanse the society of pestilence, to induce rain, to enrich human fertility, to enlist the support of supernatural forces and the "powerful mothers" in wartime, and to honor the dead), the most elaborate performance occurs during the annual festival. Sponsorship plays a big role in the size and elaborateness of these performances. The larger the performance the more likely to be sponsored by the community instead of an individual or family, which tends to be smaller. The annual Gelede festival is usually sponsored by the community so it tends to be larger.

Once the exact dates of the festival are fixed, usually through divination, the Iyalase notifies the paramount chief of the community and the important subordinate chiefs. Messages then go out to all members of the Gelede society outside the town or working far away to return home for the celebration.

The festival begins with an all-night concert called efe, which features the Efe male mask, who uses satire to entertain and educate. Given the concern of the Gelede society with peace and social stability, it is not surprising that didactic themes recur in efe songs.

After the efe dance, most of the attendees spend the morning sleeping in preparation for the afternoon dance, which takes place in the marketplace and features pairs of male dancers who perform to fast-paced music with a vigorous beat. Having to be trained from an early age, the maskers must be able to match up the sound of their anklets with the sound of the drums while having to be able to anticipate drum solos and the other maskers.

The Gelede ceremony involves carefully choreographed dance, singing and music, and especially drumming. The performances are given by men, wearing masks that feature sculpted images of scenes including animals and people or sewing machines and drums. The pair of men masquerade as women to amuse, please and placate the mothers who are considered very powerful, and who may use their powers for good or destructive purposes. These powers are especially linked to childbirth. The abilities they possess may be activated either consciously or unconsciously.

== Costume and headdress ==
Gelede masks are worn with a costume consisting of layers of elaborate, colorful cloth.

The Gelede "mask" is more accurately a headdress, since it rests on top of the head and the wearer's face is covered by a cloth veil. The headdress takes the form of a human head, on top of which are motifs that are intended to entertain onlookers but, in addition, usually address social concerns that may also be expressed in songs that are part of the masquerade. The headdresses are usually brightly painted.

Within the Gelede festival there are many different headdresses being used. The most common variations being: the Ori Eniyan, or human head. Within this group there are three subcategories. Those that have hairdos, those with head wraps or hats, and those carrying small creatures or objects. This mask is the most commonly associated with the Gelede performances.

Then there is the Iya, or Great Mother head. Igi Efe, or the Efe headress. The Oloju Meji, the double faced mask. Eleru, or head with a superstructure. This headdress has various topics such as the Ritual Bowl Carrier, occupations, religion, portraits, and satire. Followed by the Onidofoyi headdress, or the two human heads connected by snakes mask. The Ori Eye or bird head mask and the Ori Eranko, or the animal head mask.

Individuals or families will usually go to any length to make their headdresses as attractive and humorous as possible. The endless variety of the motifs and their combinations makes it difficult to attempt to construct a typology of Gelede headdresses.

Most of the headdresses have facial adornments, ranging from lineage marks to decorative tattoos, which are either incised or painted.

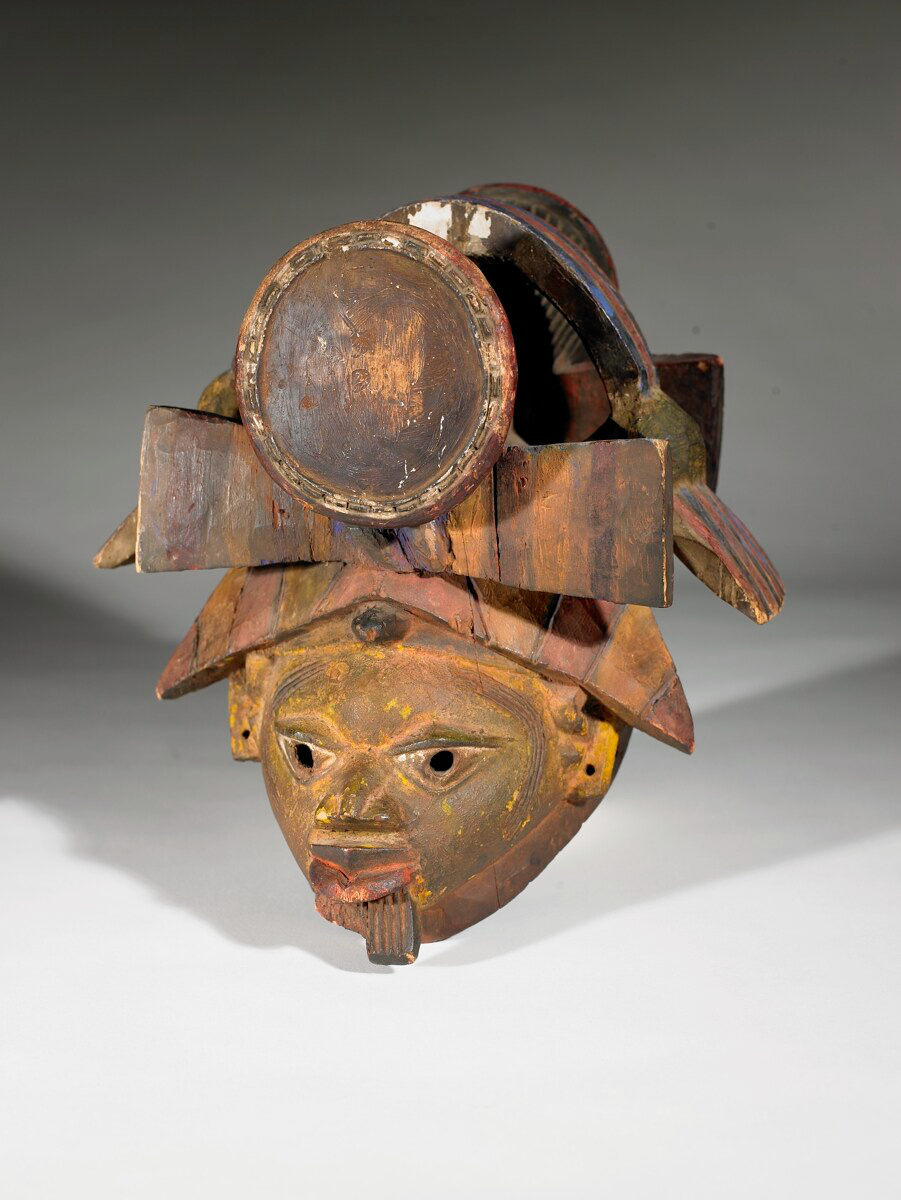
Gelede mask from the Yoruba people of Nigeria. Held at the Birmingham Museum of Art

Babatunde Lawal writes: "The headdress is to the costume what the head (ori) is to the human body. It is an index of identification and the essence of the masker's personality as long as he is inside the mask. In spite of the comical representations that often appear on the headdress, the face below the superstructure remains serene, as if stressing the paradox that is life - and the need to live life with special care."

The Costumes of the Gelede performance directly relate to the connection of women and motherhood of the society. Consisting of a baby sash, breasts, buttocks, metal anklets, colored panels, a horsetail whisk, and a fan, the materials of the Gelede costumes have various connotations. For example, the baby sash represents a breast feeding mother while also being a support within the costume itself. The daytime performances of the Gelede festival are more elaborate and colorful compared to the nighttime performances, with the exception of the Efe costume. This is because during the nighttime performances the costumes are harder to see, so it would be counterproductive to have really elaborate costumes that wouldn't be seen.
