= Fourah Bay =

Neighbourhood in Freetown, Sierra Leone

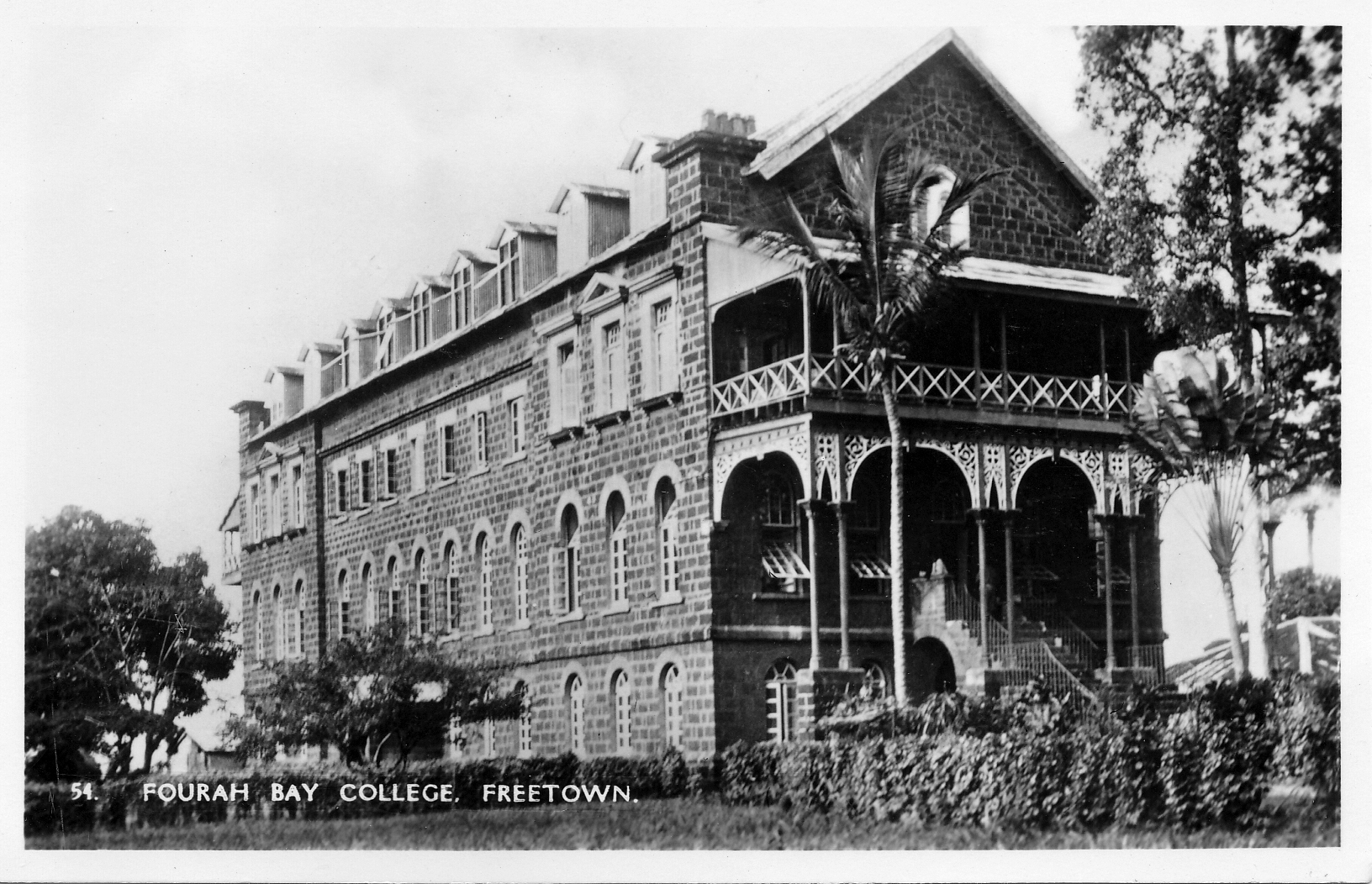
Fourah Bay College (first half of the 19th century)

Fourah Bay is a neighbourhood in Freetown, Sierra Leone. It is located in the East end of Freetown.

== Ethnicity and religion ==
Fourah Bay is an overwhelmingly Muslim majority neighborhood. The Oku people, an ethnic group predominantly of Yoruba descent, make up the majority of the population of Fourah Bay. The Oku are virtually all Muslims based on the Sunni tradition of Islam. Fourah Bay is widely known for its conservative Muslim population. Fourah Bay is also home to a prominent minority of Salafi Muslims, a deeply conservative branch within Sunni Islam. The Jamiatul Atiq Masjid is the main mosque that serves the local Muslim community; it is one of the most prominent mosques in Sierra Leone.

The community at Fourah Bay has been a source of many expert Muslim scholars, including renowned Salafi Sunni Islamic scholar Sheikh Alhaji Sulaiman Alpha Carew. Many contemporary Muslim scholars from here were once students of Carew, including such men as Sheikh Mohamed Sanusi Tejan, Sheikh Muhammad Alpha Macauley, Sheikh Alpha Musa Nabie, Sheikh Muhammad Sanusi Savage, Sheikh Alpha Teslim Williams, and Sheikh Nasim Sahid. Fourah Bay Muslim scholars are widely known for maintaining neutrality in Sierra Leonean politics and its rare for Fourah Bay Muslim leadership to publicly criticize Sierra Leonean government.

There is a small Christian minority community here. They maintain a couple of churches. The Pentecostal Church of Fourah Bay serves part of the community. Muslims and Christians have had an amicable history here.

Fourah Bay College was founded here in the nineteenth century by the British and settlers, to serve the new communities of Freetown and others. It was started as a kind of seminary or boys' academy, and gradually developed with a full academic curriculum.

== Politics ==
Since independence in 1961 to present, Fourah Bay has traditionally been a stronghold of the Sierra Leone People's Party (SLPP), the current ruling party. The SLPP is popular in Fourah Bay, and maintains majority support among its residents.

Mohammed Sanusi Mustapha (widely known as M.S. Mustapha) is known as one of the founding fathers who led Sierra Leone to Independence. He was also a prominent member of the Sierra Leone People's Party. He was a very close ally and personal friend of Sir Milton Margai, Sierra Leone's first prime minister after independence. Mustapha was highly popular here. Other notable politicians from Fourah Bay include Abdul Tejan Cole, Haja Afsatu Kabba and Madina Rahman.

The current president, Juda Bio is popular in Fourah Bay.

Some notable Oku families in Fourah Bay include the Alharazim, Ibrahim, Macauley, Alghali, Deen, Mahdi, Lewally, Cole, Rahman, Bakarr, Savage, Sahid, and Carew families.
