= Outline of Sierra Leone =

Overview of and topical guide to Sierra Leone

The Flag of Sierra Leone

The Coat of arms of Sierra Leone

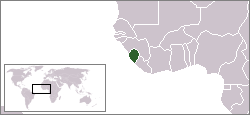
The location of Sierra Leone

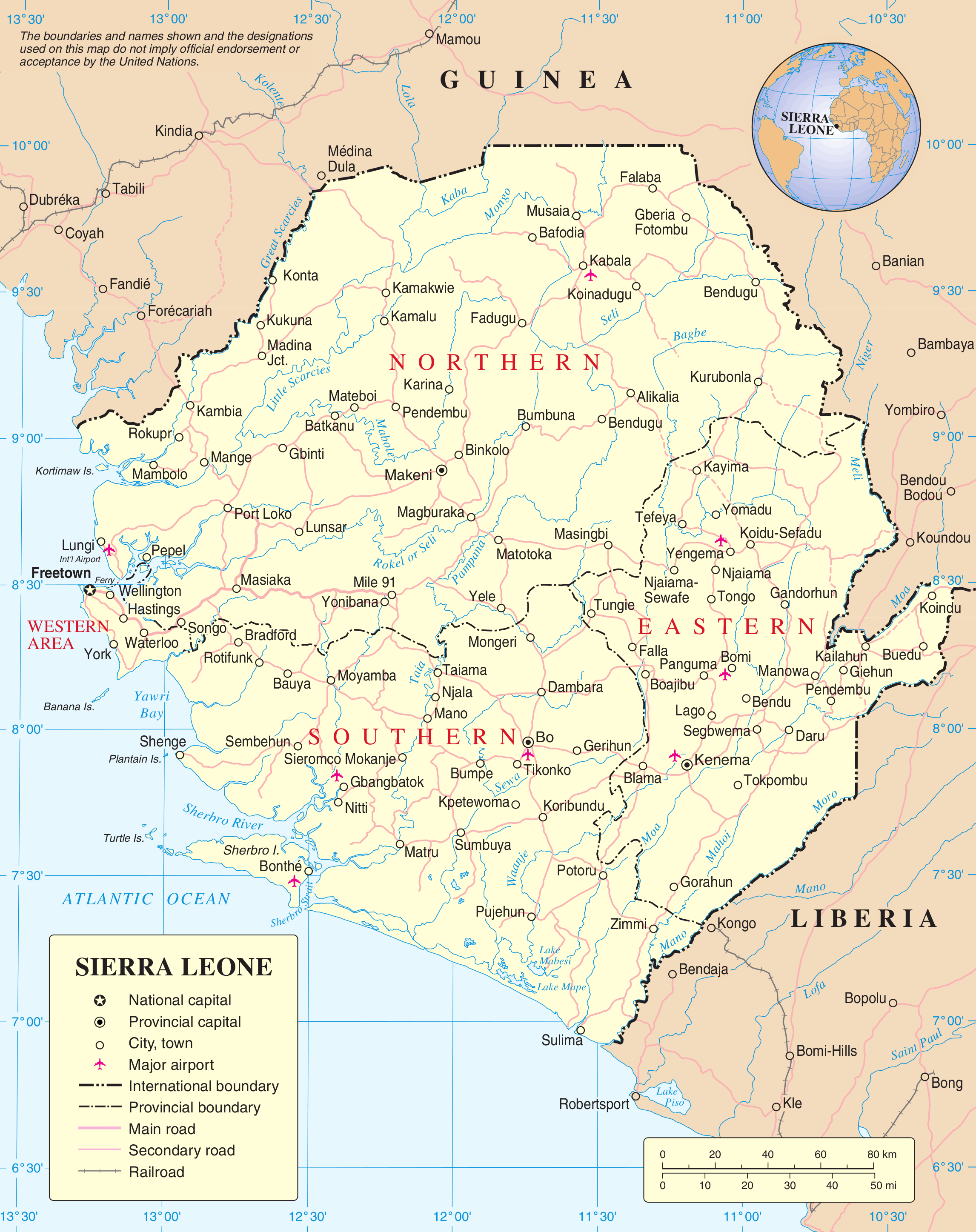
An enlargeable map of the Republic of Sierra Leone

The following outline is provided as an overview of and topical guide to Sierra Leone:

Sierra Leone – sovereign country located in West Africa. Sierra Leone is bordered by Guinea in the northeast, Liberia in the southeast, and the Atlantic Ocean in the southwest. Sierra Leone covers a total area of 71,740 km^{2} (27,699 sq mi) and has a population of 5,900,000. The country has a tropical climate, with a diverse environment ranging from savannah to rainforests. Freetown is the capital, seat of government, and largest city. Other major cities in the country with a population over 100,000 are Bo, Kenema, Koidu Town and Makeni. Although English is the official language spoken at schools and government administration, Krio (language derived from English and several West African languages and is native to the Sierra Leone Krio people) is the lingua franca spoken throughout the country. The Krio language unites all the different ethnic groups, especially in their trade and interaction with each other.

== General reference ==
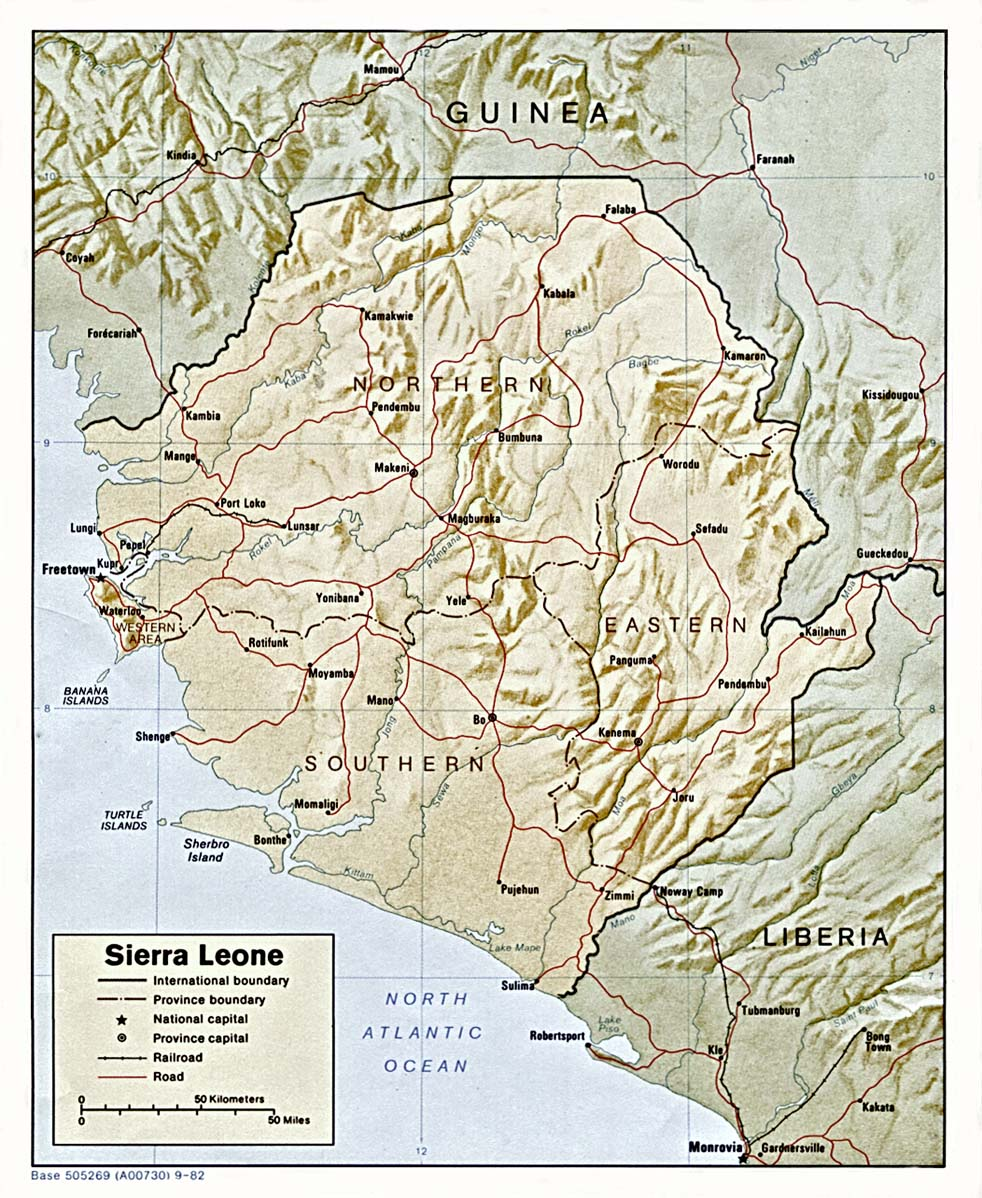
An enlargeable relief map of Sierra Leone

- Pronunciation: /siˌɛrə liˈoʊn(i)/
- Common English country name: Sierra Leone
- Official English country name: The Republic of Sierra Leone
- Common endonym(s):
- Official endonym(s):
- Adjectival(s): Sierra Leonean
- Demonym(s): Sierra Leonean(s)
- ISO country codes: SL, SLE, 694
- ISO region codes: See ISO 3166-2:SL
- Internet country code top-level domain: .sl

== Geography of Sierra Leone ==
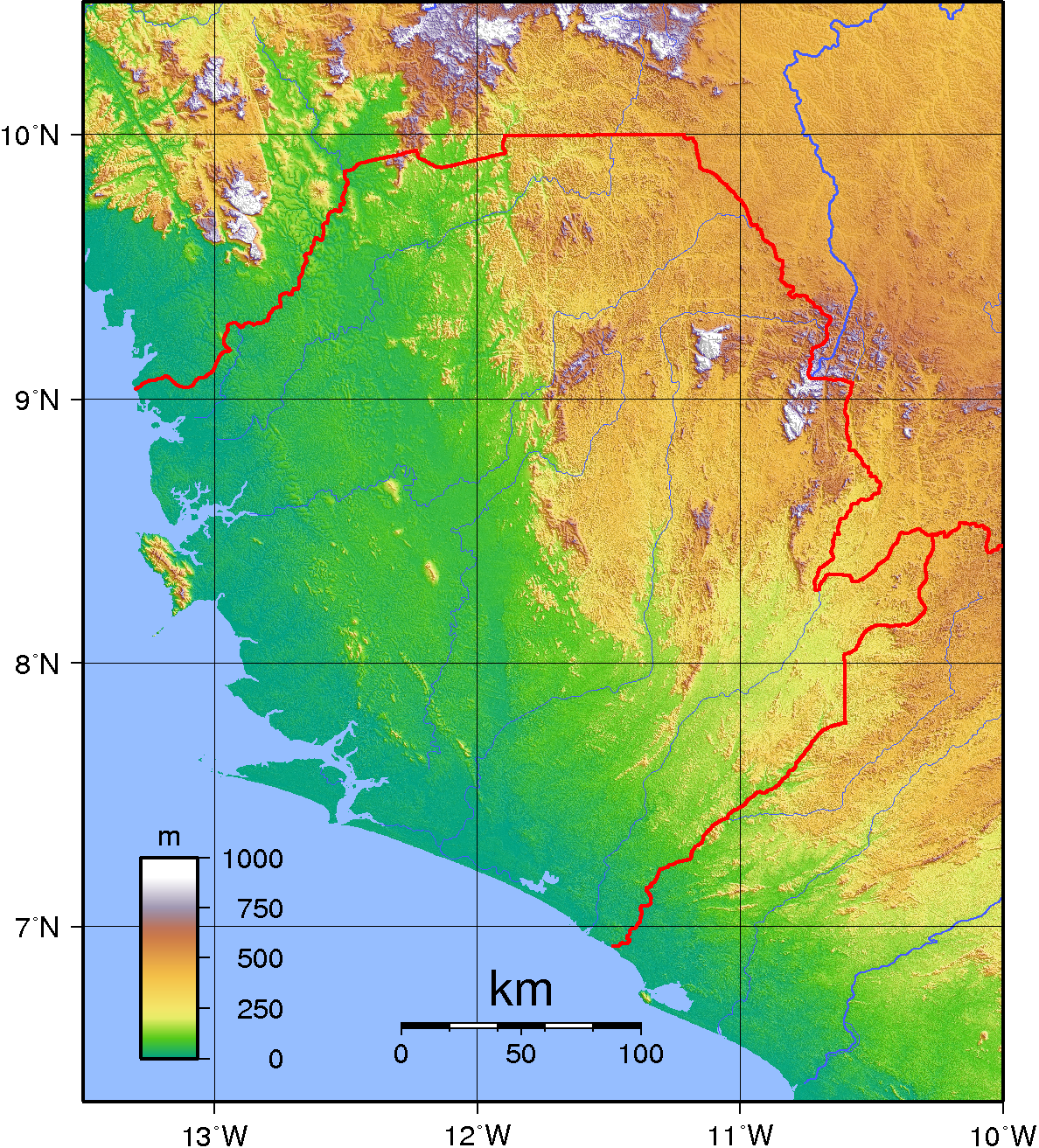
An enlargeable topographic map of Sierra Leone

Geography of Sierra Leone

- Sierra Leone is: a country
- Population of Sierra Leone: 6,294,774 (July 2008 est.)
- Area of Sierra Leone:71,740 km^{2}
  - land: 71,620 km^{2}
  - water: 120 km^{2}
- Atlas of Sierra Leone

=== Location ===
- Sierra Leone is situated within the following regions:
  - Northern Hemisphere and Western Hemisphere
  - Africa
    - West Africa
- Time zone: Coordinated Universal Time UTC+00
- Extreme points of Sierra Leone
  - High: Mount Bintumani 1,948 m (6,391 ft)
  - Low: North Atlantic Ocean 0 m
- Land boundaries: 958 km

Guinea 652 km
Liberia 306 km

- Coastline: North Atlantic Ocean 402 km

=== Environment of Sierra Leone ===
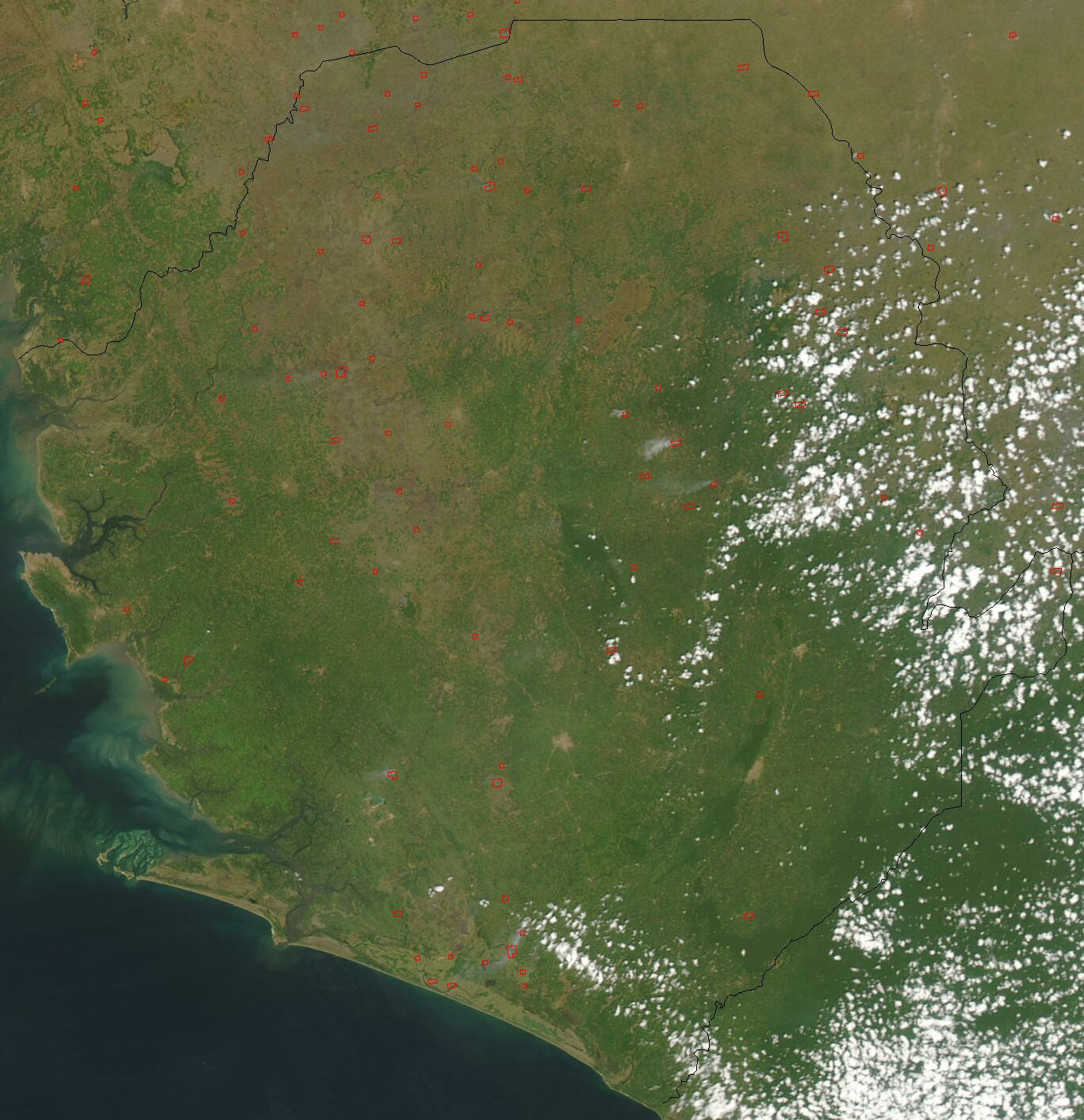
An enlargeable satellite image of Sierra Leone

- Climate of Sierra Leone
- Upper Guinean Rainforest Ecoregions
- Protected areas of Sierra Leone
- Wildlife of Sierra Leone
  - Fauna of Sierra Leone
    - Birds of Sierra Leone
    - Mammals of Sierra Leone

==== Natural geographic features of Sierra Leone ====
- Glaciers in Sierra Leone: none
- Rivers of Sierra Leone
- World Heritage Sites in Sierra Leone: None

=== Regions of Sierra Leone ===
Regions of Sierra Leone

==== Ecoregions of Sierra Leone ====
List of ecoregions in Sierra Leone

==== Administrative divisions of Sierra Leone ====
Administrative divisions of Sierra Leone

- Provinces of Sierra Leone
  - Districts of Sierra Leone

===== Provinces of Sierra Leone =====
Provinces of Sierra Leone

===== Districts of Sierra Leone =====
Districts of Sierra Leone

===== Chiefdoms of Sierra Leone =====
Chiefdoms of Sierra Leone

=== Demography of Sierra Leone ===
Demographics of Sierra Leone

== Government and politics of Sierra Leone ==
Politics of Sierra Leone

- Form of government: presidential representative democratic republic
- Capital of Sierra Leone: Freetown
- Elections in Sierra Leone
- Political parties in Sierra Leone

=== Branches of the government of Sierra Leone ===
Government of Sierra Leone

==== Executive branch of the government of Sierra Leone ====
- Head of state and Head of government: President of Sierra Leone, Julius Maada Bio
- Cabinet of Sierra Leone

==== Legislative branch of the government of Sierra Leone ====
- Parliament of Sierra Leone (unicameral, also known as the House of Representatives)

==== Judicial branch of the government of Sierra Leone ====
Court system of Sierra Leone

- Supreme Court of Sierra Leone

=== Foreign relations of Sierra Leone ===
Foreign relations of Sierra Leone

- Diplomatic missions in Sierra Leone
- Diplomatic missions of Sierra Leone

==== International organization membership ====
The Republic of Sierra Leone is a member of:

- African, Caribbean, and Pacific Group of States (ACP)
- African Development Bank Group (AfDB)
- African Union (AU)
- Commonwealth of Nations
- Economic Community of West African States (ECOWAS)
- Food and Agriculture Organization (FAO)
- Group of 77 (G77)
- International Atomic Energy Agency (IAEA)
- International Bank for Reconstruction and Development (IBRD)
- International Civil Aviation Organization (ICAO)
- International Criminal Court (ICCt)
- International Criminal Police Organization (Interpol)
- International Development Association (IDA)
- International Federation of Red Cross and Red Crescent Societies (IFRCS)
- International Finance Corporation (IFC)
- International Fund for Agricultural Development (IFAD)
- International Labour Organization (ILO)
- International Maritime Organization (IMO)
- International Monetary Fund (IMF)
- International Olympic Committee (IOC)
- International Organization for Migration (IOM)
- International Red Cross and Red Crescent Movement (ICRM)
- International Telecommunication Union (ITU)
- International Trade Union Confederation (ITUC)
- Inter-Parliamentary Union (IPU)
- Islamic Development Bank (IDB)
- Multilateral Investment Guarantee Agency (MIGA)
- Nonaligned Movement (NAM)
- Organisation for the Prohibition of Chemical Weapons (OPCW)
- Organization of Eastern Caribbean States (OECS)
- United Nations (UN)
- United Nations Conference on Trade and Development (UNCTAD)
- United Nations Educational, Scientific, and Cultural Organization (UNESCO)
- United Nations Industrial Development Organization (UNIDO)
- United Nations Integrated Mission in Timor-Leste (UNMIT)
- Universal Postal Union (UPU)
- World Confederation of Labour (WCL)
- World Customs Organization (WCO)
- World Federation of Trade Unions (WFTU)
- World Health Organization (WHO)
- World Intellectual Property Organization (WIPO)
- World Meteorological Organization (WMO)
- World Tourism Organization (UNWTO)
- World Trade Organization (WTO)

=== Law and order in Sierra Leone ===
Law of Sierra Leone

- Constitution of Sierra Leone
- Human rights in Sierra Leone
  - Abortion in Sierra Leone
  - LGBT rights in Sierra Leone
- Law enforcement in Sierra Leone

=== Military of Sierra Leone ===
Military of Sierra Leone

- Command
  - Commander-in-chief:
- Forces
  - Army of Sierra Leone
  - Navy of Sierra Leone
  - Air Force of Sierra Leone

=== Local government in Sierra Leone ===
Local government in Sierra Leone

== History of Sierra Leone ==
=== Period-coverage ===
- Colonial era
- Dominion
- 1961 to 1978

== Culture of Sierra Leone ==
Culture of Sierra Leone

- Cuisine of Sierra Leone
- Languages of Sierra Leone
- Media in Sierra Leone
- National symbols of Sierra Leone
  - Coat of arms of Sierra Leone
  - Flag of Sierra Leone
  - National anthem of Sierra Leone
- People of Sierra Leone
  - List of people from Freetown
- Prostitution in Sierra Leone
- Public holidays in Sierra Leone
- Religion in Sierra Leone
  - Christianity in Sierra Leone
  - Islam in Sierra Leone
    - Ahmadiyya in Sierra Leone
  - Judaism in Sierra Leone
- World Heritage Sites in Sierra Leone: None

=== Art in Sierra Leone ===
- Art in Sierra Leone
- Literature of Sierra Leone
- Music of Sierra Leone

=== Sports in Sierra Leone ===
Sports in Sierra Leone

- Football in Sierra Leone
- Sierra Leone at the Olympics

== Economy and infrastructure of Sierra Leone ==
Economy of Sierra Leone

- Economic rank, by nominal GDP (2007): 158th (one hundred and fifty eighth)
- Agriculture in Sierra Leone
- Banking in Sierra Leone
  - Bank of Sierra Leone
- Communications in Sierra Leone
  - Internet in Sierra Leone
- Companies of Sierra Leone
- Currency of Sierra Leone: Leone
  - ISO 4217: SLL
- Health care in Sierra Leone
- Mining in Sierra Leone
- Tourism in Sierra Leone
- Transport in Sierra Leone
  - Airports in Sierra Leone
  - Rail transport in Sierra Leone
- Water supply and sanitation in Sierra Leone

== Education in Sierra Leone ==
Education in Sierra Leone

== See also ==
Sierra Leone

- List of international rankings
- Member state of the Commonwealth of Nations
- Member state of the United Nations
- Outline of Africa
- Outline of geography
- 2014 Ebola virus epidemic in Sierra Leone
