= List of companies of Sierra Leone =

Location of Sierra Leone

Sierra Leone, officially the Republic of Sierra Leone, is a country in West Africa. The economy of Sierra Leone is that of a least developed country with a GDP of approximately US$1.9 billion in 2009. Since the end of the civil war in 2002 the economy is gradually recovering with a GDP growth rate between 4 and 7%. In 2008 its GDP in PPP ranked between 147th (World Bank) and 153rd (CIA) largest in the world. Sierra Leone's economic development has always been hampered by an overdependence on mineral exploitation. Successive governments and the population as a whole have always believed that "diamonds and gold" are sufficient generators of foreign currency earnings and lure for investment. As result large scale agriculture of commodity products, industrial development and sustainable investments have been neglected by governments. The economy could thus be described as based upon the extraction of unsustainable resources or non-reusable assets. Sierra Leone is a member of the WTO.

== Notable firms ==
This list includes notable companies with primary headquarters located in the country. The industry and sector follow the Industry Classification Benchmark taxonomy. Organizations which have ceased operations are included and noted as defunct.

Notable companies Status: P=Private, S=State; A=Active, D=Defunct
Name	Industry	Sector	Headquarters	Founded	Notes	Status	
Afrik Air Links	Consumer services	Airlines	Freetown	1991	Private airline, defunct 2005	P	D
Air Leone	Consumer services	Airlines	Lungi	1999	Regional airline, defunct 2005	P	D
Air Rum	Consumer services	Airlines	Amman (Jordan)	2002	Chartered airline, defunct 2008	P	D
Bank of Sierra Leone	Financials	Banks	Freetown	1963	Central bank	S	A
Bellview Airlines	Consumer services	Airlines	Freetown	1995	Airline, defunct 2008	P	D
Fly 6ix	Consumer services	Airlines	Lungi	2010	Airline	P	A
Paramount Airlines	Consumer services	Airlines	Freetown	2001	Helicopter services, defunct 2007	P	D
Rokel Commercial Bank	Financials	Banks	Freetown	1917	Commercial bank	P	A
SALPOST	Industrials	Delivery services	Freetown	1961	Postal services	S	A
Sierra Leone Brewery Limited	Consumer goods	Brewers	Freetown	1963	Brewery, part of Heineken (Netherlands)	P	A
Sierra Leone Commercial Bank	Financials	Banks	Freetown	1973	Commercial bank	P	A
Sierra National Airlines	Consumer services	Airlines	Freetown	1990	Airline, defunct 2006	P	D
Union Trust Bank	Financials	Banks	Freetown	1995	Commercial bank	P	A

Shopping mall in Kenema.

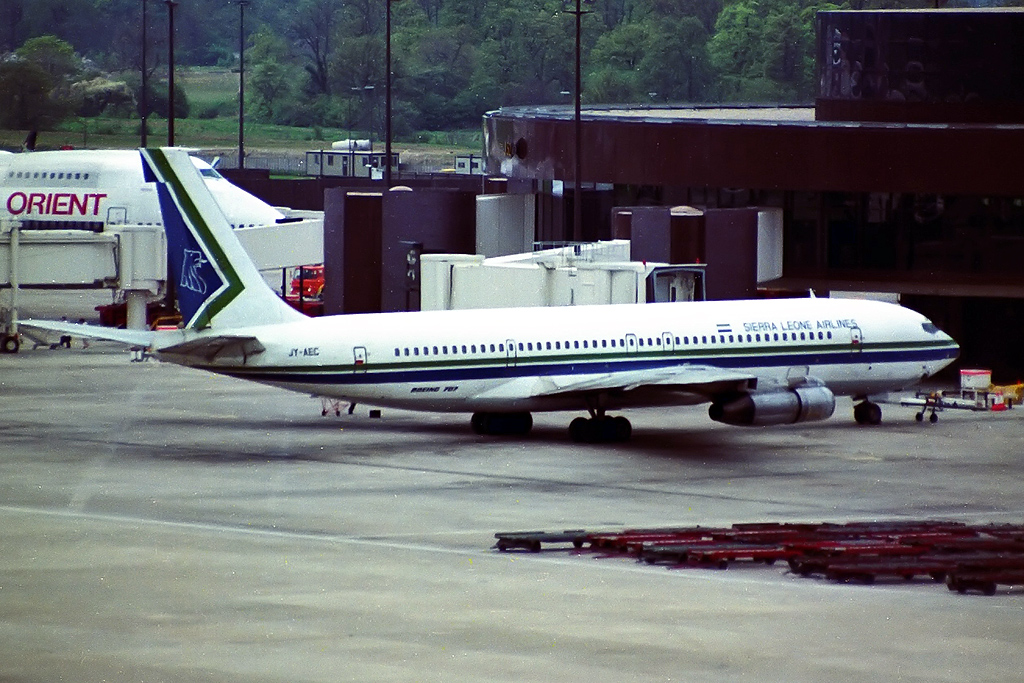
Sierra Leone Airlines Boeing 707 at London Gatwick Airport (May 1983).

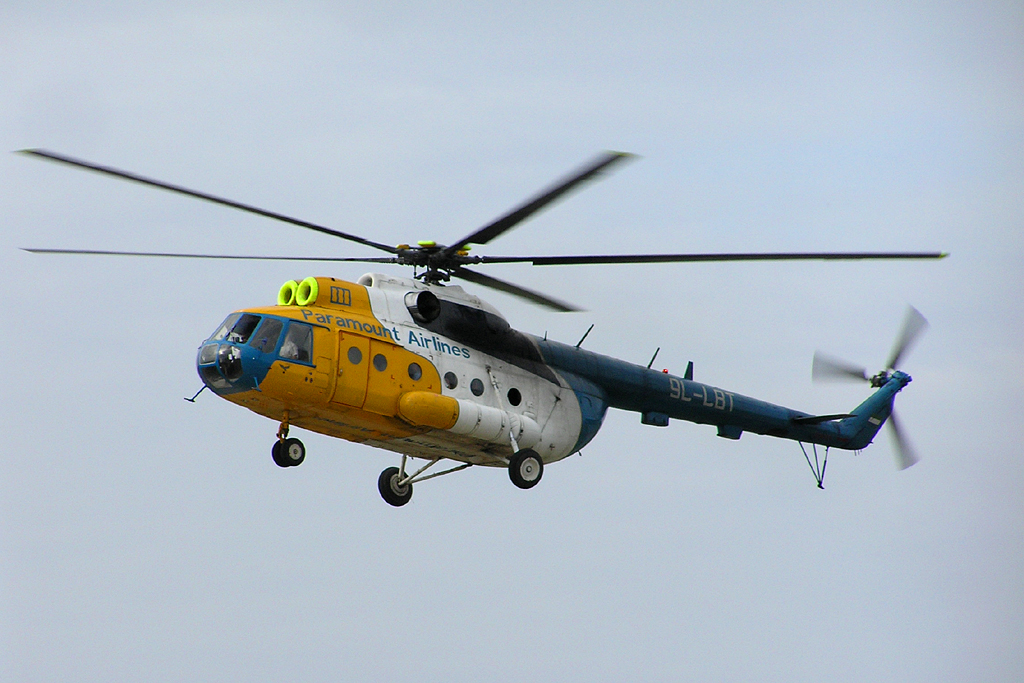
A Paramount Airlines Mil Mi-8 at Freetown Lungi Airport, arriving from Mammy Yoko Heliport in Freetown.

== See also ==
- Economy of Sierra Leone
- Sierra Leone Selection Trust
- List of banks in Sierra Leone
