= Minoritarianism =

Primacy of a minority in decision-making

In political science, minoritarianism (or minorityism) is a neologism for a political structure or process in which a minority group of a population has a certain degree of primacy in that population's decision making, with legislative power or judicial power being held or controlled by a minority group rather than a majority that is representative of the population. Minoritarianism is sometimes used to describe minority rule, rule by a dominant minority such as an ethnic group delineated by religion, language, or some other identifying factor.

== Examples ==
=== Africa ===
Christians in Sierra Leone are an example of minoritarianism. As of 2020, they make up 21% of its population compared to 78% Muslims.

The Tutsi in Rwanda from 1884 to 1959 exerted minoritarian rule over the Hutu population. The Tutsi-led Rwandan Patriotic Front has been Rwanda's ruling political party since 1994.

==== South Africa ====
South Africa was ruled by the apartheid regime from 1948 to 1994, wherein White South Africans (especially Afrikaners) wielded predominant control of the country although they were never more than 22% of the population. All non-white South Africans were subject to segregation and discriminatory laws, resulting in disparities in quality of life.

==== Liberia ====
In Liberia, African American-descended nationals (known as Americo-Liberians) settled in Liberia during the 19th century. Americo-Liberians were culturally disconnected from native Liberians, preferring Western-style wear, American food, Protestantism, and the English language. They formed an elite that ruled as a de facto one-party state under the True Whig Party (TWP). The 1980 Liberian coup d'état overthrew the administration.

=== Asia ===
==== Iran ====
The Mongols killed 15 million Indo-Iranians as the Mongols ruled Iran.

==== China ====
China experienced minoritarian periods in two separate instances. The Mongol Empire was founded by Mongols and Han governors ruled over the majority of the population of China from 1271 to 1368.

The Qing regime of China in 1682 until 1911 created a law making everybody wear Manchu-syle clothing and styles.

==== Taiwan ====
During the Kuomintang-led authoritarian rule of "White Terror" (1947–1987), Taiwan was ruled by the minority Waishengren, and the political rights of the majority Benshengren were restricted.

== See also ==
- Client politics
- Criticism of democracy
- Elitism
- Iron law of oligarchy
- Liberum veto
- Majoritarianism (opposite)
- Minority influence
- Minority (philosophy)
- Minority rights
- Oligarchy
- Ruling class
- Social privilege
- Tyranny of the majority
- Majority rule
- Herrenvolk democracy
