= List of banks in Sierra Leone =

This is a list of commercial banks in Sierra Leone, as updated in October 2024 by the Bank of Sierra Leone.

== List of commercial banks ==
- Sierra Leone Commercial Bank Limited, state-owned
- Rokel Commercial Bank (SL) Limited
- Standard Chartered Bank (SL) Limited, part of Standard Chartered Group
- Union Trust Bank Limited
- Guaranty Trust Bank (SL) Limited, part of GTCO Group
- Vista Bank (SL) Limited, part of Vista Bank Group
- First Bank (SL) Limited, part of First Bank of Nigeria Group
- Ecobank (SL) Limited, part of Ecobank Group
- Access Bank (SL) Limited, part of Access Bank Group
- United Bank for Africa (SL) Limited, part of UBA Group
- Skye Bank (SL) Limited, part of Polaris Bank Group
- Zenith Bank (SL) Limited, part of Zenith Bank Group
- Bloom Bank Africa (SL) Limited (formerly Keystone bank)
- Commerce & Mortgage Bank (SL) Plc

== See also ==
- Banking in Sierra Leone
- Economy of Sierra Leone
- List of companies based in Sierra Leone
- List of banks in Africa
