= Religion in Sierra Leone =

Religion in Sierra Leone (Pew Research Center 2020)
1. Islam (80.1%)
2. Christianity (19.8%)
3. Other (0.10%)

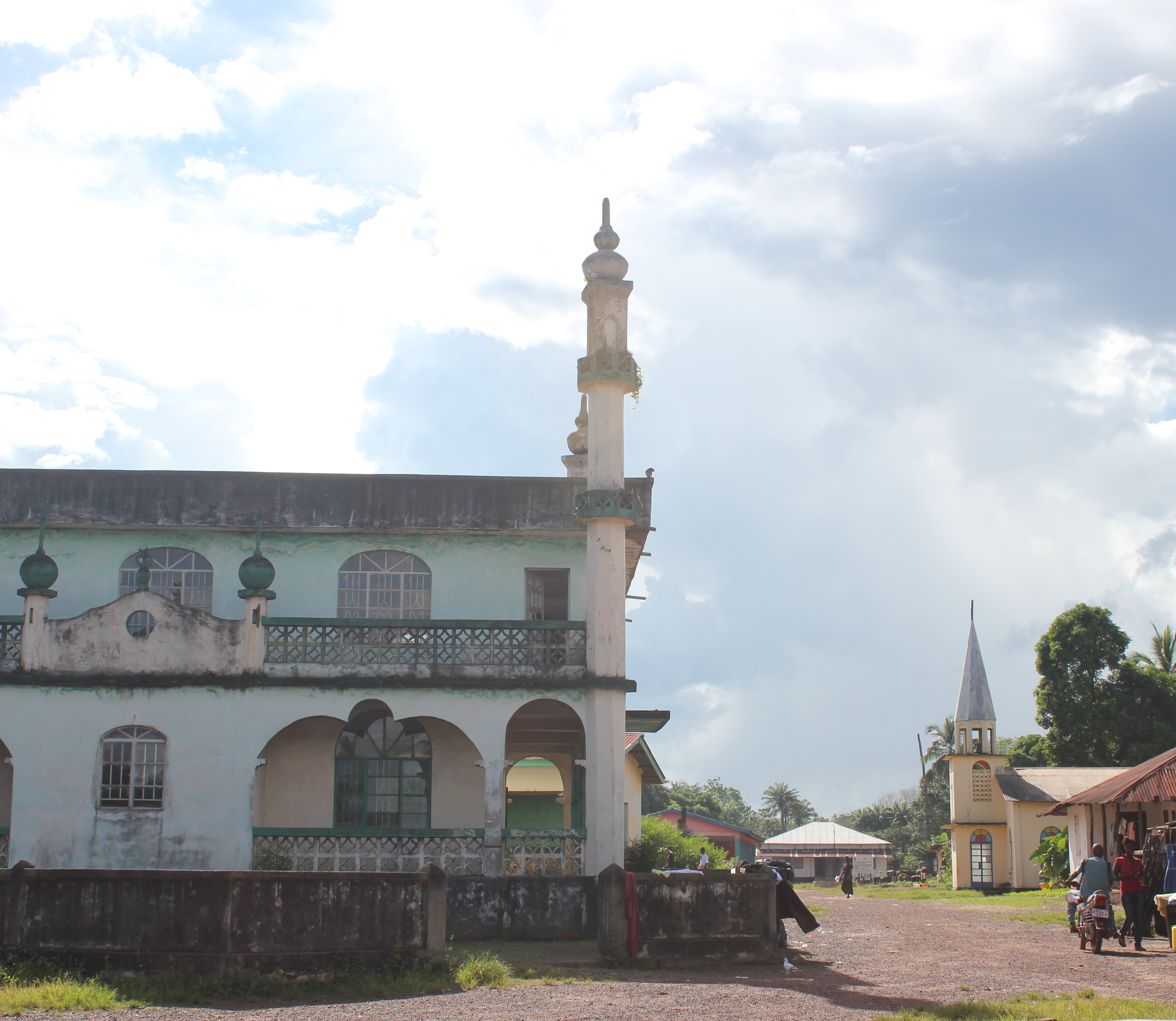
Mosque and church in Sierra Leone

Sierra Leone is officially a secular state. Islam and Christianity are the two main and dominant religions in the country. The constitution forbids a state religion, though Muslim and Christian prayers are usually held in the country at the beginning of major political occasions, including presidential inauguration.

According to a 2020 estimates by the Pew Research Center 80.1% of Sierra Leone's population are Muslims (mostly Sunni Muslims), 19.8% are Christians (mostly Protestants) and 0.1% belong to a traditional African religion or other beliefs. The Inter-Religious Council of Sierra Leone estimated that 77% of Sierra Leone's population are Muslims, 21% are Christians, and 2% are followers of traditional African religion.

Sierra Leone is one of the most religiously tolerant countries in the world. Religious violence is rare in the country. Even during the Sierra Leonean Civil War religion was never a target for persecution. Sierra Leone is home to the Sierra Leone Inter-Religious Council, which is made up of both Christian and Muslim religious leaders to promote peace and tolerance throughout the country. The Islamic holidays of Eid al-Fitr, Eid al-Adha and Maulid-un-Nabi are national holidays in Sierra Leone. The Christian holidays of Christmas, Boxing Day, Good Friday and Easter are also holidays. All of Sierra Leone's Heads of State have been Christians except Ahmad Tejan Kabbah (who was a Muslim).

The vast majority of Sierra Leone's Muslims are Sunnis tradition of Islam. Shia Muslims form a very small percentage, at less than 0.5% of the Muslim population. Most Sierra Leonean Muslims of the Sunni and Ahmadiyya sects regularly pray together in the same Mosques.

The Sierra Leone Islamic Supreme Council, is the highest Islamic religious organization in Sierra Leone and is made up of the country's Imams, Islamic scholars, and other Islamic clerics across the country. The current president is Muhammad Taha Jalloh. The United Council of Imams, is an Islamic religious body in Sierra Leone, that is made up of all imams of mosques throughout the country. The president of the United Council of Imam is Sheikh Alhaji Muhammad Habib Sheriff.

Among the present most highly prominent Sierra Leonean Muslim scholars and preachers are Sheikh Abu Bakarr Cotco Kamara, Sheikh Muhammad Taha Jalloh, Sheikh Umarr S. Kanu, Sheikh Ahmad Tejan Sillah, Sheikh Saeedu Rahman, and Sheikh Muhammad Habib Sheriff. All of the Sierra Leonean Muslim scholars mentioned above are Sunni Muslims, except Sheikh Ahmad Tejan Sillah, who is a Shia Muslim; and Sheikh Saeedu Rahman, who is an Ahmaddiya Muslim.

The majority of Christians in Sierra Leone are Protestant, of which the largest groups are Methodists and Pentecostals. Other Protestant denominations with a significant presence in the country include Presbyterians, Baptists, Seventh-day Adventists Anglicans, Lutherans, and Pentecostals.

Catholics make up the second largest group after protestants in the country, forming about 8% of Sierra Leone's population or 26% of the Christian population. Jehovah’s Witnesses and members of the Church of Jesus Christ of Latter-day Saints are the two most prominent non Trinitarian groups in Sierra Leone. They form a small minority of the Christian population in Sierra Leone. A small community of Orthodox Christians resides in the capital Freetown. Non-denominational Christians are also present in Sierra Leone.

== Ethnic groups ==
The distribution of major ethnic groups within Sierra Leone

== Islam ==
Islam is the largest and majority religion in the country. Around 80.1% of Sierra Leone's population is Muslim. The vast majority of Sierra Leonean Muslims are Sunni and follow the Maliki school. The two largest ethnic groups in Sierra Leone, the Temne and Mende, are both Muslim majority. Ten of Sierra Leone's sixteen ethnic groups are mostly Muslim.

The history of Islam in the region dates back to when Muslim merchants from the Mali Empire migrated to the northern areas of modern Sierra Leone. Islam began rapidly spreading around the 18th century onwards as merchants formed social and economic relationships with locals along with creating religious institutions for the practice of the faith.

== Christianity ==
The vast majority of Sierra Leonean Christians are Protestants with biggest groups being Methodists and various Evangelical Protestants. Other Protestant denominations in the country include Presbyterians, Baptists, Seventh-day Adventists and Lutherans.

In the mid-19th century, Protestantism was spread after the establishment of Freetown Lodge No. 1955. It was the first Orange Lodge in Africa. British and Irish settlers, missionaries, and colonial officials introducing the fraternity there when it was a British Crown Colony and key colonial port. The Orange Order focused on teaching Protestant history and evangelism, and attracted educated locals.

Roman Catholics are the second largest non-Protestant Christians division in Sierra Leone at about 5% of the country's population.

The Jehovah’s Witnesses, Anglicans and Latter-day Saints form a small minority of the Christian population in Sierra Leone. The orthodox church has 3.000 members.

== Religious freedom and issues ==
The constitution of Sierra Leone provides for freedom of religion and the government generally protects this right.

In 2017, a Sierra Leone-based Nigerian Pentecostal Christian pastor was arrested by the Sierra Leone Police and held in jail after he preached religious hatred and hate speech against Islam and Muslims at his church sermon in the capital Freetown.

== Bibliography ==
- "Religion in Sierra Leone: All things happily to all men". The Economist. 31 May 2014.
