= Union Trust Bank =

Commercial bank in Sierra Leone

- Company type: Private
- Founded: 1995
- Headquarters: 2 Howe Street; Freetown, Sierra Leone
- Key people: Ajaratu M. Mahdi; Chairperson; James Sanpha Koroma; Chief Executive Officer
- Products: Savings, Checking, Investments
- Revenue: ▲Aftertax: SLL: 1.466 billion (US$197,000) (2015)
- Total assets: SLL:361.82 billion (US$48.6 million) (2015)
- Number of employees: 280 (2015)
- Website: Homepage

Union Trust Bank (UTB), whose full name is Union Trust Bank Limited, is a commercial bank in Sierra Leone. It is licensed as a "commercial bank" by the Bank of Sierra Leone, the central bank and national banking regulator.

== Overview ==
The bank, according to its website, is the only privately owned indigenous commercial bank in the country, as of May 2017. As of December 2015, the bank's total assets were valued at SLL:361.817 billion (approximately US$48.6 million), with shareholders' equity of SLL: 58.162 billion (approximately US$7.811 million).

== History ==
UTB was founded in 1995 by Sierra Leonean individuals and corporations and was registered as a limited liability company. It began offering banking services following the issuance of a commercial banking license by the Bank of Sierra Leone. On 17 March 2017, the bank celebrated the opening of its headquarters building, on Howe Street, in Freetown, performed by Ernest Bai Koroma the president of Sierra Leone.

== Branch Network ==
As of May 2017, UTB maintains branches at the following locations:

(1) Main Branch - Lightfoot-Boston Street, Freetown (2) Njala University Branch - Njala University, Mokonde Campus, Moyamba District (3) Kenema Branch - 19 Hangha Road, Kenema, Eastern Province (4) Bo Branch - 7 Bojon Street, Bo, Southern Province (5) Kono Branch - 5 Old Yengema Road, Koidu, Kono District (6) Kambia Branch - Sierra Leone-Guinea Highway, Kambia (7) Lumley Branch - Lumley Road, Freetown (8) Kissy Branch - 49 Baibureh Road, Kissy, Freetown (9) Magburaka Branch - Kono Makeni Highway, Magburaka (10) Liverpool Street Branch - Liverpool Street, Freetown (11) Brookfields Branch - Main Motor Road, Freetown (12) New England Ville Branch - Jomo Kenyatta Road, Freetown (13) Lunsar Branch - Lunsar (14) Yoni Branch - Mile 91, Freetown Bo Highway

== See also ==
- List of banks in Sierra Leone
- List of banks in Africa
- Economy of Sierra Leone
- Bank of Sierra Leone
