= Samuel Lansana Bangura =

Sierra Leonean politician

- Samuel Lansana Banguara
- Born: Samuel Lansana Bangura; 7 June 1930; Tonkolili District, Northern Province, Sierra Leone
- Died: 18 December 1979 (aged 49); Freetown, Sierra Leone
- Other name: Sam Bangura
- Education: Bo School, Hull University, Queen's College, University of Oxford
- Occupations: Bank Governor; Civil Servant
- Spouse(s): Mariama Tity, née Wurie
- Writing career
- Language: English, Krio, Temne

Samuel Lansana Bangura (7 June 1930 – 18 December 1979), commonly known as Sam Bangura, was a Sierra Leonean banker and civil servant who was the second Sierra Leonean to serve as Governor of the Bank of Sierra Leone.

The assassination of Bangura in 1979 during the administration of President Siaka Stevens was one of the first high-profile assassinations in postcolonial Sierra Leone. The assassination is widely cited by some scholars as an example of the repressive and violent nature of the Siaka Stevens' administration.

== Early life ==
Samuel Lansana Bangura was born on June 7, 1930, at Yele in Tonkolili District in the Northern Protectorate to Santigi Bangura and Mbalu Koroma. Bangura was born to parents from the Temne ethnic group in Sierra Leone.

== Education ==
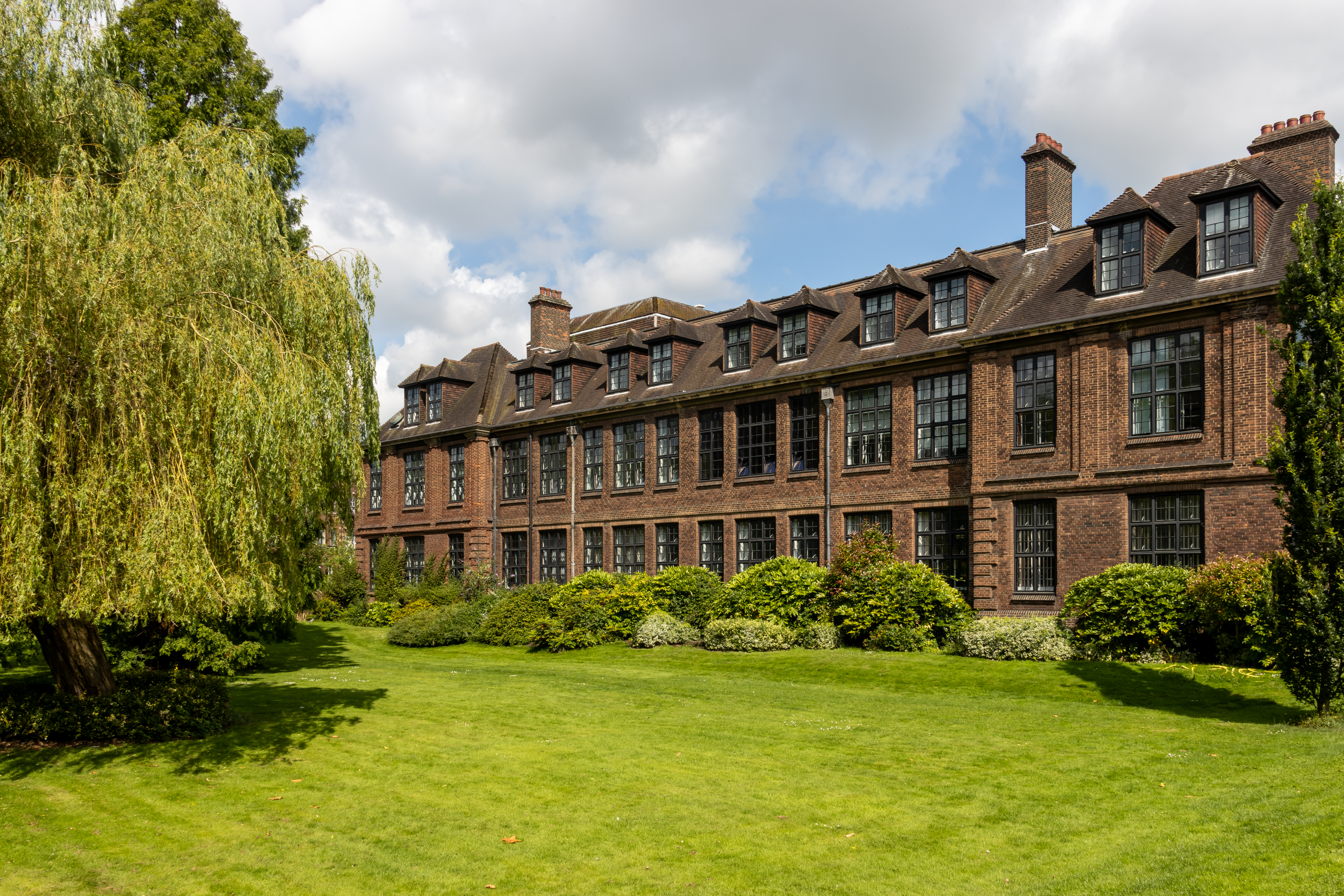
Venn Building, University of Hull

Bangura was educated at the Seventh Day Adventist Mission School in Yele and subsequently attended school in Koyeima and at the Bo School.

He subsequently studied economics at Hull University in Britain and graduated in 1957.

He studied the Devonshire Course "A" at Queen's College, University of Oxford between 1958 and 1959.

== Career ==
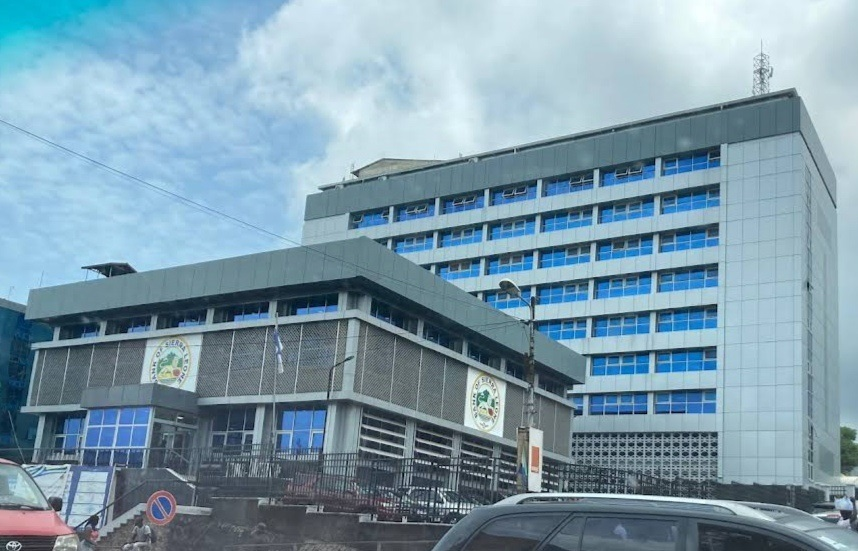
Bank of Sierra Leone

Samuel Bangura returned to Sierra Leone and was appointed as assistant commissioner in Bonthe in 1959. He was subsequently appointed as the district commissioner in Bonthe and served in this role until August 1962.

Bangura joined the Ministry of Finance and was appointed as a Permanent Secretary in the Development Office between May 1964 and February 1966.

He subsequently served in the Bank of Sierra Leone in February 1966 and was appointed as the deputy governor of the Bank in June 1966.

Bangura succeeded Silvanus Nicol-Cole as Bank governor in November 1970.

== Personal life ==
Samuel Bangura married Mariama Tity, née Wurie, a daughter of Madam Fatmatta Kahn and, Amadu Wurie, an educationist and one-time SLPP Minister of Education and Minister of the Interior. Bangura had six children.

== Assassination ==
Samuel Bangura was assassinated at his house in the west end of Freetown on 18 December 1979.

Although suspects were arrested and convicted, the Siaka Stevens administration was widely implicated in the assassination of Bangura. It was alleged that Abayomi Alhadi, an Oku state-sponsored assassin also known as 'Highway' carried out the assassination of Bangura.
