= Sierra Leone Commercial Bank =

- Type: State owned enterprise
- Industry: Financial services
- Founded: February 15, 1973; 53 years ago
- Headquarters: Freetown, Sierra Leone
- Products: Commercial banking, retail banking
- Owner: Government of Sierra Leone (100%)
- Website: www.slcb.com

Sierra Leone Commercial Bank (SLCB) is a Sierra Leone commercial bank. It is one of the commercial banks licensed by the Bank of Sierra Leone, the country's central bank and national banking regulator.

It serves large corporations, small and medium enterprises, and individual customers. It is operated and managed by indigenous Sierra Leonians.

== History ==
SLCB was founded in 1973.

== Ownership ==
The stock of the bank is 100 percent owned by the Government of Sierra Leone.

== Branch network ==
SLCB maintains its headquarters in Freetown, the capital, and has branches in Freetown, Bo, Kenema, Makeni, Koidu, Cline Town, Mobimbi, Njala, and Waterloo.

== See also ==
- Banking in Sierra Leone
- List of banks in Sierra Leone
- List of banks in Africa
