= Ahmadiyya in Sierra Leone =

Islamic movement

The Ahmadiyya Muslim Community is the second-largest sect of Islam in Sierra Leone, behind only Sunni Islam. The earliest history of the Community in Sierra Leone dates back to the early period of the Second Caliphate, when at least six people are said to have conveyed their adherence to the faith. The sect attained rapid growth in the country after the 1937 arrival of Nazir Ahmad Ali, the first permanent Ahmadi missionary in Sierra Leone. Recent estimates by Ahmadi community suggest that there are approximately 560,000 Ahmadi Muslims in Sierra Leone, which is about 9% of the country's total population. Sierra Leone has the largest percentage of Ahmadi Muslims by share of total population in the world.

== History ==
=== Establishment ===
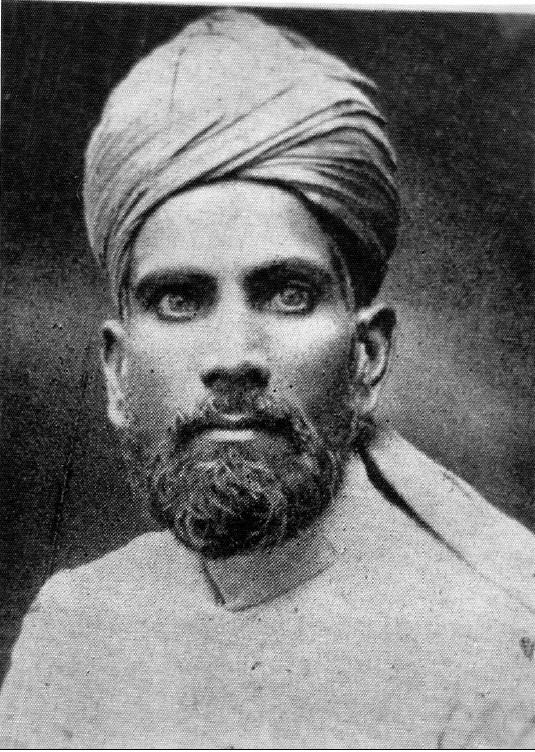
Nazir Ahmad Ali, first permanent missionary to Sierra Leone

The earliest history of the Ahmadiyya Muslim Community in Sierra Leone can be traced to the year of 1916, during the early period of the Second Caliphate. In that year at least six people are said to have conveyed their adherence to the Ahmadiyya faith, after being influenced by the circulation of Ahmadiyya literature in Sierra Leone from neighbouring West African nations. However, it was not until almost half a decade later, in February 1921, that the first missionary of the Community, Abdur Raheem Nayyar, would set foot on the territory. Nayyar stayed temporarily in the capital Freetown, whilst he was on his route towards Saltpond, in modern-day Ghana, and Lagos, in Nigeria for his missionary activities. At the request of the chief Imam of the city, he gave a lecture at a mosque in Fourah Bay, a town in the east end of Freetown. A year later, in 1922, another missionary of the Community, Fadl-ul-Rahman Hakim paid a short visit to the country. Like Nayyar, Hakim was on his way to Lagos, Nigeria. Nevertheless, there are no recorded conversions from either of the visits.

After an interval of 15 years, Nazir Ahmad Ali arrived in 1937 as a permanent missionary to Sierra Leone. Ali had spent a year at the Gold Coast, modern-day Ghana, after his arrival from India. Upon the year of his arrival, Ali settled in Freetown, and established the Ahmadiyya Muslim Community of Sierra Leone. Before long, he gave a lecture at the Wilberforce Memorial Hall, the principal public meeting place of the city, addressing the Muslim and Christian populations of the country. In this early address, he introduced the Community and the coming of Mirza Ghulam Ahmad as the Imam Mahdi for the Muslims, and the second coming of Jesus for the Christians. At another event, he solely addressed Muslims at the Islamia School adjacent to a Mandinka mosque. Such addresses directed at the Muslim populations often gave rise to hostilities from Muslim communities. Perhaps for his safety, Ali moved into the house of Kande Bure, chief of the Temne people of Freetown, and a Cabinet minister.

However, having been rejected by the majority of Muslim groups in Freetown, Ali decided to move to a coastal town, Mange Bure, in the Port Loko District. Kande Bure himself was born in Mange Bure, where his father was an influential political figure. Having achieved little success in his preaching efforts, Ali moved; this time in the same district to the small port-town of Rokupr. Here Ali had reasonable success, where he managed to establish a small community of Ahmadi Muslims, among them a number of local influential figures. Rokupr was also the site of the first school established by the Ahmadiyya Muslim Community of Sierra Leone.

=== Early growth ===
Some of the locations of notable Ahmadi Muslim missionary activities up until the 1940s

Two years later, in 1939, Ali transferred to Baomahun, a flourishing gold mining town, south of Bo in the Eastern Province of Sierra Leone. Multiple reasons have been postulated for this move. It has been suggested that a Syrian trader in Baomahun wrote a letter to Ali after having read Ahmadiyya literature. In another instance, Droman, a vice-chief, invited Ali to Baomahun. Nevertheless, Ali was welcomed as a renowned preacher, as his fame grew across the country. Soon after his arrival, he initiated his preaching efforts inviting people to accept the message of Mirza Ghulam Ahmad as the Imam Mahdi. During this period a prevalent belief in Sierra Leone was that the appearance of the Mahdi would be announced by the beating of great drums, as a result of which the nonbelievers will perish, which Ali interpreted as a parable. Soon, Baomahun developed into a full-fledged headquarters of the Ahmadiyya missionary activities in Sierra Leone, as many people joined the Community. In March 1940, Maulana Muhammad Siddiq Amritsari arrived as Sierra Leone’s second missionary. By this time, the town boasted a school and an Ahmadi Muslim mosque. The latter was provided for, after a discussion with its builder, Sanpha Tulla. The former initially had two teachers, one from Rokupr and another from Saltpond, the Ghanaian missionary headquarters.

During the 1940s, Ali made multiple expeditions across the country. One notable journey was towards the east, as a consequence of which two of the most prominent people became Ahmadi Muslims. In Boajibu, Ali met Khalil Gamanga, a Paramount Chief of the Kenema District. Gamanga soon accepted Ahmadiyya and made notable contributions to the faith in the country. In Fala, Ali confronted with Qasim, Chief of Baama and a leading diamond magnate. In 1958, Qasim took Amritsari on a pilgrimage to Mecca. By 1942, a mission was established in Magburaka, in the Tonkolili District. A year later, in 1943 a school was opened in the city, and a number of influential figures became Ahmadi Muslims.

As Baomahun was a mining town, its gold was gradually exhausted, and thus its future was bound to be threatened. This led to two important consequences. The dispersion of its inhabitants, many of whom were Ahmadi Muslims, led to the spread of Ahmadiyya teachings across towns and villages of the country. On the other hand, the Ahmadiyya headquarters had to be relocated for which Bo was conveniently selected. In the summer of 1944, per request of the caliph, Ali left the country, and Amritsari became the country’s missionary-in-charge. In March 1945, Amritsari established a religious school in Bo and in 1946 he announced the relocation of the Ahmadiyya school in Baomahun. In the same year, Ali arrived for his second trip which lasted for a few months. By this period Ali was in-charge of the Ahmadiyya missionary efforts of West Africa. In 1948, Ahmadiyya finally found a noticeable foothold in Freetown where a mission house was erected.

In 1954 Ali made his third and final journey to Sierra Leone. He died in the country on 19 May 1954. By this time, Ali was the only Pakistani Ahmadi to have given the majority of his working life to West Africa. By the 1960s, Bo hosted the two mission houses, an English, Arabic and Urdu Ahmadi Muslim library and a printing press. It also was the center of the largest Ahmadiyya primary school in Sierra Leone.

=== Journeys by caliphs ===
The first Ahmadi Muslim caliph to visit the country was Caliph Mirza Nasir Ahmad whose visit in 1970 was instrumental in the launch of the Nusrat Jahan Scheme which has been responsible for the establishment of at least 160 primary schools, 26 secondary schools, and five hospitals in Sierra Leone. On May 5, 1970, the caliph landed at Lungi International in Freetown and was received by leading Ahmadi Muslims from Sierra Leone, Ministers of State and other governmental officials. Apart from propagating teachings of Ahmadiyya Islam, his visit came in light of a number of meetings with the Governor General, the Prime Minister, and other governmental officials. Soon after arrival, he made his way towards the State Guest House. In the evening he presided a meeting at the British Council Hall, in Freetown, and the following day he paid a visit to the country's Acting Governor-General and its Prime Minister Siaka Stevens. Later in the week he held a banquet with Banja Tejan-Sie, the Governor General and Siaka Stevens, the Prime Minister of Sierra Leone. The Sierra Leone Muslim Congress held a reception in his honor at the town Hall, in Freetown. In 1988, the fourth caliph paid a similar visit to a number of West African countries, include Sierra Leone.

== Demographics ==
The Ahmadiyya Community claims to have about 560,000 adherents in Sierra Leone, which is 9% of the total population. This is by far the highest percentage of Ahmadi Muslims by share of national population in the world. Some estimates place the number of Ahmadi Muslims in Sierra Leone as high as 700,000.

== Modern community ==
Since the 1960s, the Ahmadiyya Muslim Community in Sierra Leone has held an annual convention known as Jalsa Salana. The event typically commences with a prayer and a flag hoisting ceremony and lasts for roughly three days. The convention is usually attended by various notable individuals, such as the president of Sierra Leone, senior Islamic clerics, and paramount chiefs from across the country.

In recent years, the Ahmadiyya Community in Sierra Leone has engaged in the rapid construction of new mosques and educational facilities. There are over 1200 Ahmadi mosques in Sierra Leone. Approximately 19 central missionaries and 131 local missionaries are stationed in the country. The Ahmadiyya Community runs about 300 schools, both primary and secondary, in Sierra Leone. Many Sierra Leoneans of various religious faiths are graduates of or are associated with Ahmadiyya schools. For example, Victor Bockarie Foh, the Vice President of Sierra Leone from 2015 to 2018, was a teacher of Economics and Government at the Ahmadiyya Secondary School in Freetown. He was the first indigenous Sierra Leonean teacher at that school. His predecessor, former Vice President Samuel Sam-Sumana, was educated at the same school. On 27 April 2013, the Community received the Presidential Gold Award "in recognition of its long and outstanding contribution to the nation in the fields of Education, Health, Agriculture and Humanitarian Activities." It is the only Muslim Community to have received such an award.

As part of a wider trend of discrimination against Ahmadis, the Ahmadiyya Community in Sierra Leone occasionally comes into conflict with other groups. Efforts by the Ahmadiyya Community to join the Inter-Religious Council, a Muslim and Christian interfaith organization, were resisted by Sunnis who considered the Ahmadis to be heretics. The Ahmadiyya Community was eventually allowed to join the Council and reportedly enjoys good relations with other members. In 2019, a secret society known as Poro attempted to force Ahmadis in Kenema to join their organization. When the Ahmadis refused, the Poro members kidnapped five men, violently initiated multiple people into their society, captured livestock, and burned eight houses. About 90 Ahmadis fled in the aftermath of the attack. The police were hesitant to investigate the incident due to fear of the Poro's influence.

== See also ==
- Islam in Sierra Leone
- Christianity in Sierra Leone
- Hinduism in Sierra Leone
