= Rokel Commercial Bank =

Commercial bank in Sierra Leone

- Type: Private company
- Industry: Financial services
- Founded: 1917; 109 years ago
- Headquarters: Freetown, Sierra Leone
- Key people: Buffy Bailor (Chairman), Ekundayo Walton Gilpin (Managing Director)
- Products: Banking
- Number of employees: 500+ (2022)
- Website: www.rokelbank.sl

Rokel Commercial Bank (RCB) is a commercial bank in Sierra Leone. It is one of the commercial banks licensed by Bank of Sierra Leone, the national banking regulator.

The bank is named after the Rokel River, the longest river in Sierra Leone. RCB serves members of the public, small and medium enterprises (SMEs), as well as large corporations. According to the bank's web site, it one of the three largest commercial banks in the country by assets.

== History ==
Founded in 1917 as Barclays Bank of Sierra Leone as a subsidiary of Barclays Bank, the name was changed when ownership of the bank's stock changed hands in 1999.

== Governance ==
The Chairman of the seven-person Board of Directors is Birch M. Conte, one of the non-Executive directors. Victor Keith Cole serves as the Managing Director and Chief Executive Officer. He is assisted by seven other senior managers in the day-to-day running of the bank.

== Branch Network ==
As of September 2013, Rokel Commercial Bank maintains a network of branches at the following locations:

1. Main Branch - 25-27 Siaka Stevens Street, Freetown
2. Congo Cross Branch - 1 Wilkinson Road, Freetown
3. Industrial Area Branch - Wellington Industrial Area, Freetown
4. Clock Tower Branch - 7 Kissy Road, Freetown
5. Wilberforce Street Branch – 39 Wilberforce Street, Freetown
6. Bo Branch - 10 Bojon Street, Bo
7. Kenema Branch – 12 Dama Road, Kenema
8. Koidu Branch - 2 New Sembehun Road, Koidu
9. Makeni Branch - Independence Square, Mabanta Road, Makeni
10. Moyamba Branch – Siaka Stevens Street, Moyamba
11. Pujehun Branch – Stoke Road, Pujehun
12. Charlotte Street Branch - Charlotte Street, Freetown
13. Wilberforce Barracks Branch - Wilberforce Barracks

== See also ==
- Banking in Sierra Leone
- List of banks in Sierra Leone
- List of banks in Africa
