= Hindu Union of Mombasa =

Religious organization

- Abbreviation: HU
- Established: 1899; 127 years ago
- Founder: Hindu Communities
- Type: Religious Organisation
- Headquarters: Shiva Temple, Makadara, Mombasa, Kenya
- Region served: Kenya
- Key people: Ratilal Shah; Madhu Patel; Kamal Anantroy Bhatt; Madhu Ruparelia; Dinesh Parmar
- Remarks: Patron deity: Lord Shiva

The Hindu Union of Mombasa is one of Kenya's oldest Hindu organisation, which is based out of the port city of Mombasa.

== History ==
The Hindu Union was formed in 1899 after a group of emigrated Gujarati Indians decided to walk village-to-village with the aim of trying to gather funds to build a grand temple. Eventually after enough funds were gathered, a temple in Central Mombasa was built and a Lingam was constructed. Funds for the Makadara temple were additionally raised from all regional samajas within Mombasa.

In 1928, the Union adapted a constitution and a democratic system of governance was implemented. Manilal Govindji Shah, and with philanthropist Kanubhai Babla, being immediate past Trustee, a position they held till their death. Suryakant B. Gor became the chairman and remained at this position for over 40 years, during his tenure he was instrumental in the development of the temple and acquisition of various properties held by the Hindu Union of Mombasa.

Major renovations were also carried out in 2018 by Hasmukhbhai Patel of Mombasa Cement Ltd (MCL), free of cost to the temple.

=== Gombeshwar caves ===
According to local historians, there is a cave formation in the north of the current temple where it contains natural lingam (in the form of stalagmite) and the natural rock formation resembling Ganesha, the Shiva's son. It was discovered by a local Indian doctor in the late 19th century while treating a local herdman from a bee attack.

== Gallery ==
Shiva Temple in Mombasa, Kenya.

Shiva temple at Mombasa, Makadara.

Statue of Shiva at Hindu Union.

Banyan tree at Hindu Union of Mombasa.

Art of Krishna at a Holi function.

Ram darbaar at Hindu Union Mombasa.

Maharudra rituals in Mombasa.

Nandi statue at Shiva temple.

== See also ==
- Hinduism in Kenya
- Shaivism
- List of Hindu temples outside India
- Indians in Kenya
