= Arthur Johnson (banker) =

Sierra Leonean politician

Arthur S.C. Johnson
- Arthur S.C. Johnson
- Born: Arthur Salako Christopher Johnson; 9 July 1920; Freetown, Sierra Leone
- Died: 31 May 2000 (aged 79); Freetown, Sierra Leone
- Education: Sierra Leone Grammar School, and Durham University
- Occupations: Governor of the Bank of Sierra Leone, Auditor-General
- Writing career
- Language: English, Krio

Arthur Salako Christopher Johnson OBE GCOR (9 July 1920 – 31 May 1991) was a Sierra Leonean banker, accountant, and business leader who served as the third Sierra Leonean governor of the Bank of Sierra Leone in 1980.

Johnson also previously served as the Auditor-General of the Republic of Sierra Leone.

== Early life and education ==
Arthur Salako Christopher Johnson was born on 9 July 1920 in Freetown, Sierra Leone to Sierra Leonean parents of Creole origin.

Arthur Johnson was educated at the Cathedral Primary School and subsequently at the Sierra Leone Grammar School. After completing his secondary school education, Johnson graduated from Fourah Bay College in 1949. He also gained experience at the U.K. Overseas Audit Department in London, England.

== Career ==
=== Civil service and Auditor-General ===
Arthur Johnson joined the Sierra Leone Civil Service as a graded clerk in 1941.

He was the Audit Assistant between 1954 and 1956 and the Assistant Auditor between 1964 and 1965 when he was appointed as Director, a position that was redesignated as Auditor-General in August 1965.

Johnson served as Auditor-General of Sierra Leone between 1965 and 1970.

=== Central bank governor ===
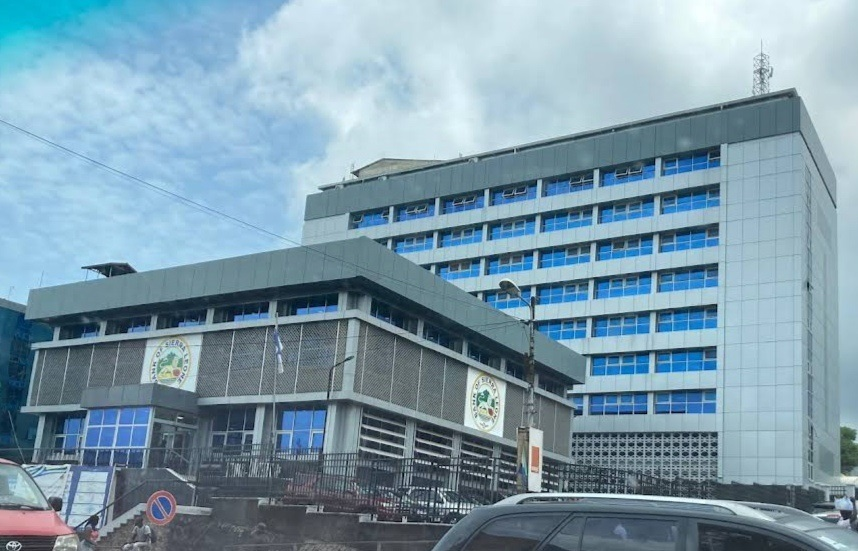
Bank of Sierra Leone

Johnson was appointed as the deputy governor of the Bank of Sierra Leone in 1970. He served as governor of the Bank of Sierra Leone from 1980 until his retirement in 1981.

== Recognition ==
Arthur Johnson was awarded an OBE for his services as Auditor-General of the Republic of Sierra Leone in the 1970 Queen's Birthday Honours.

Johnson was appointed as a justice of peace in 1973. He received the Order of the Rokel of Sierra Leone in April 1981.

He was a Visiting Fellow at the Auditor-General's Office in Canada. Johnson served on the IMF External Audit Committee in Sierra Leone in 1971, and he served as Chairman of the IMF Committee in 1971. He was a member of the Freetown Dinner Club.
