= Agriculture in Sierra Leone =

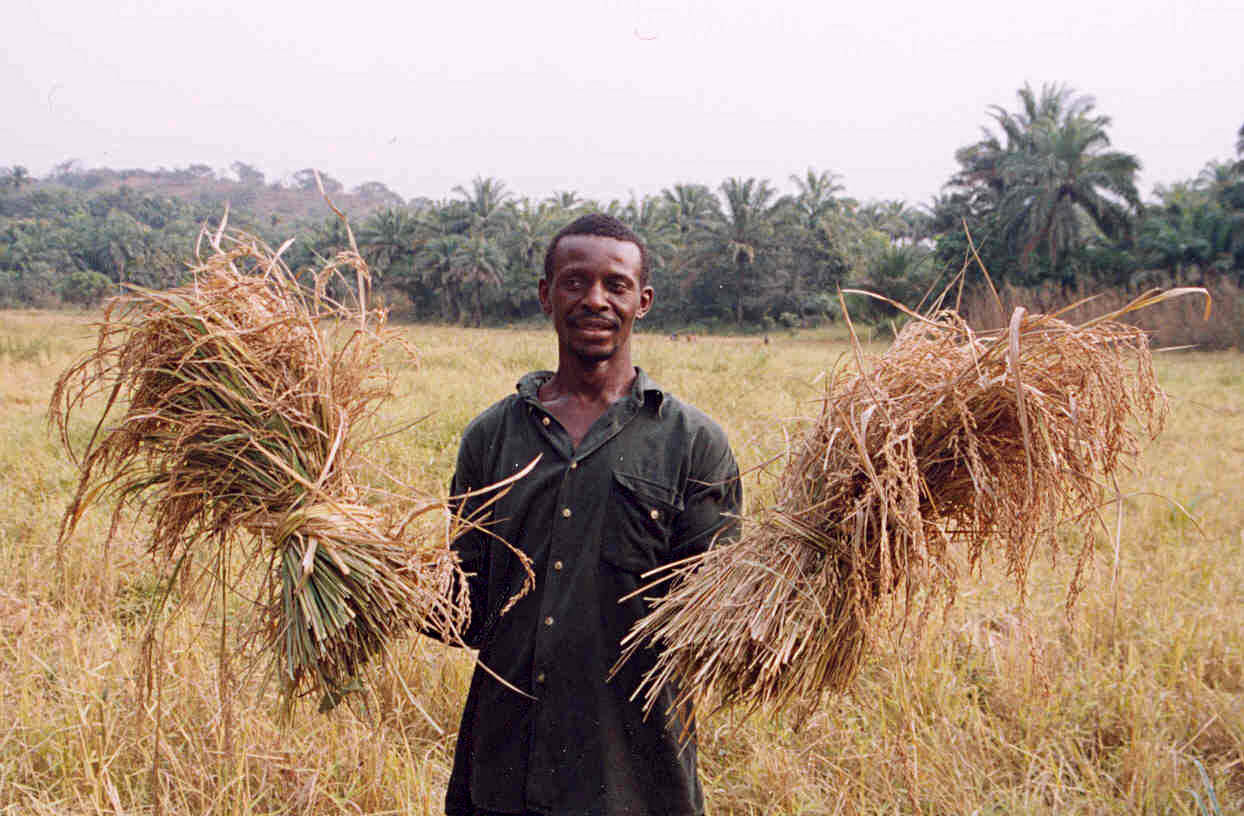
A farmer with his rice harvest in Sierra Leone

Agriculture in Sierra Leone is a significant part of the economy of Sierra Leone, with it accounting for 58 percent national Gross Domestic Product (GDP) in 2007. Two-thirds of the population of Sierra Leone are involved in subsistence agriculture.

The agricultural sector grew by about 14 percent in 2007, led by crops, and five percent in 2008. Despite this growth the country is a net importer of food; for example, in 2004 19,000 tonnes of rice was imported.

== Economic value ==
Agriculture accounts for more than half of Sierra Leone's GDP, 58.5% in 2007. It is the largest employer, with 80 percent of the population working in the sector and two thirds of the population involved in subsistence agriculture. In 2007 the sector grew by 14 percent, led by crops and by five percent in 2008.

Sierra Leone is not self-sufficient in food. Food is one of Sierra Leone's biggest imports. Agricultural exports in 2006 accounted for 4 percent of total exports worth more than six million US dollars with cocoa being the biggest export, accounting for more than 5 million US dollars of this.

== Agricultural products ==
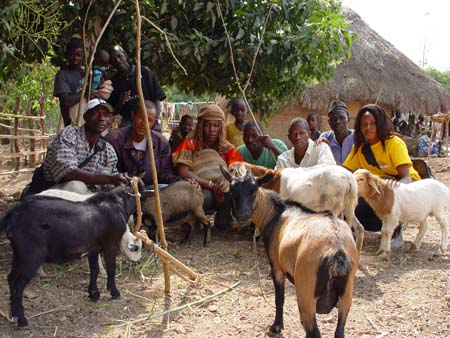
West African Dwarf goats given to villages in the Kabala area of Sierra Leone as aid in the aftermath of the civil war to help increase income

=== Rice ===
Rice is the most important staple crop in Sierra Leone with 85 percent of farmers cultivating rice during the rainy season and an annual consumption of 76 kg per person. In 2004 an area of 2,100 km^{2} (810 sq mi) was cultivated for rice producing an annual yield of 265,000 t. Rice is grown in three different ecologies, mangrove swamp rice, upland rice and deepwater rice. With around 200 km^{2} (77 sq mi) of land in deepwater rice cultivation Sierra Leone is the main area for tropical deepwater rice.

=== Cassava ===
The second staple food grown across the country is cassava with an annual yield of 350,000t in 2006. The main areas of production are in the south-west, central and far north. The main problems with cassava cultivation include disease and pests. Major diseases are the cassava mosaic disease and cassava bacterial blight, which have the greatest economic impact, cassava brown leaf spot, cassava anthracnose, and white thread fungus.

=== Other major food crops ===
Other major annual food crops include sorghum, maize, millet, sweet potato and groundnut.

=== Plantation cash crops ===
The main tree crop is the oil palm, used for its perennial fruit, that can be processed into palm oil and sap which is turned into palm wine. The other main perennial crops are citrus, sugarcane, cocoa, coffee, and coconut.

=== Livestock ===
Numbers of livestock
Livestock	1984	2002	2005
Cattle	333,181	100,000	200,000
Sheep	264,000	200,000	375,000
Goats	145,000	250,000	450,000
Pigs		20,000	35,000
Chicken		4,000,000	5,200,000
Domestic ducks		300,000	500,000
Domestic rabbits		5,000	7,000

Common livestock in Sierra Leone are cattle, sheep, goats, pigs and poultry. The civil war seriously depleted the level of livestock in the country, although numbers have recovered since the end of the war in 2002. Most cattle are of the trypanotolerant N'Dama breed and problem diseases include contagious bovine pleuropneumonia.

Cattle are found in the north of the country and farming is dominated by the Fula ethnic group who own the majority of cattle in the country and often manage cattle owned by other groups. Poultry farming consists mainly of chickens, with some guinea fowl and Muscovy ducks.

Sheep are found across the whole of the country and are of the dwarf Djallonke breed. Goats are of the West African Dwarf breed. They are found all over the country but 60 percent live in the Northern Province. The breeds of sheep and goats are hardy, able to survive the rigorous environment and are resistant to the trypanosomiasis disease. The West African Dwarf goats can survive on grazing alone all year, even in the dry season, without the need for additional feed. Diseases that effect the sheep and goats include foot rot, internal parasites and heartwater.

== Governance ==
Agricultural development is a priority for the Government of Sierra Leone and falls under the remit of the Ministry of Agriculture, Forestry and Food Security. On 22 September 2009 Sierra Leone signed the Comprehensive Africa Agricultural Development Programme (CAADP) compact, agreeing to raise the percentage of the budget spent and agriculture to 10 percent. In 2007 the percentage of the budget spent on agriculture was 1.7 percent but this had increased to 9.9 percent in 2010.
