= Hinduism in Kenya =

Total population
- 61,287 (2019)▲ ; 0.13% of total population

Regions with significant populations
- All Over Kenya but mostly on urban areas: Nairobi, Mombasa, Kisumu, Nakuru and Malindi

Religions
- Hinduism

Related ethnic groups
- Indians in Kenya and Hindus

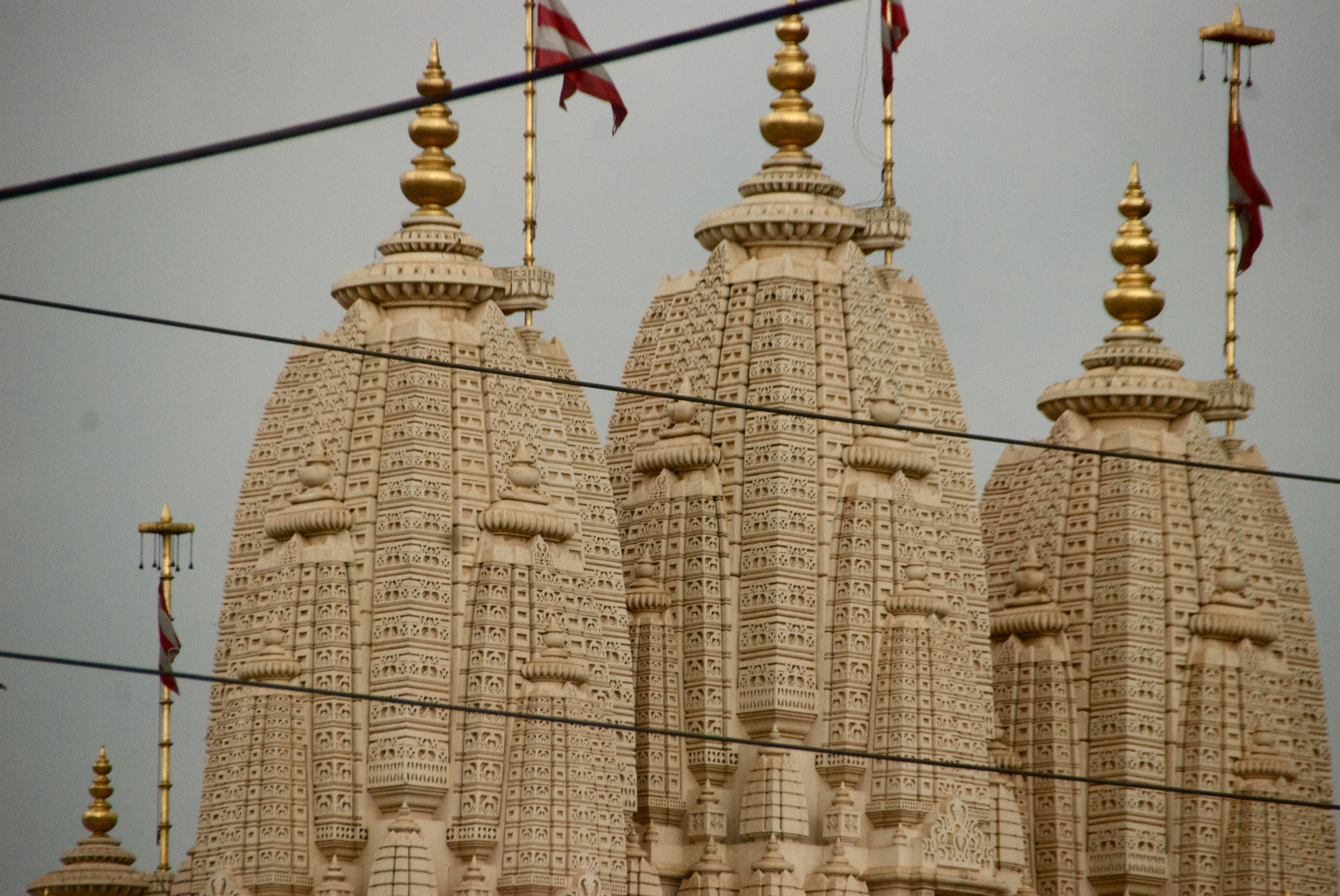
Hindu temple in Nairobi

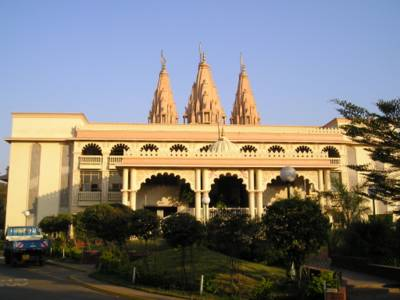
EASS Swaminarayan Temple in Nairobi.

Hinduism is a minority faith in Kenya, constituting 0.13% of the population of Kenya. Due to the efforts of the Hindu Council of Kenya, Kenya is one of only three African countries to recognise Hinduism as a religion. Hindus are free to practise their religion in Kenya, and several Kenyan cities have Hindu temples. The Hindu temples in Kenya are mostly of north and west Indian architectural style.

== History ==
Hinduism in Kenya mainly comes from coastal trade routes between primarily between Gujarat, Marwar, Odisha and the Chola empire in India and East Africa.

The influence of Hinduism in Kenya began in early 1st millennium AD when there was trade between East Africa and Indian subcontinent. Archaeological evidence of small Hindu settlements have been found mainly in Zanzibar and coastal parts of Kenya, Swahili coast, Zimbabwe and Madagascar. Many words in Swahili language have their etymological roots in Indian languages associated with Hinduism. The origin of the Kenyan Gujarati dates back to the late 1800s (early 1900s), when British colonialists brought laborers from India to build the Uganda–Kenya railway. Many of the laborers, rather than travel back to the Indian subcontinent, simply settled in Kenya, and slowly brought with them a host of hopefuls willing to start afresh.

== Demographics ==
One percent of Kenyan population practiced Hinduism as reported by IRF. However, according to the 2019 Census, there were 61,287 Hindus in Kenya, who constitute 0.13% of the population.

According to the Pew Research Center estimates there were 60,000 Hindus in Kenya in 2010, or less than 0.25% of the total Kenyan population.

== Hindus in Kenya ==
Today, the Gujarati community in Kenya is estimated at over fifty thousand, and is dispersed throughout the country. Despite varying degrees of acculturation, most have retained their strong Gujarati ties.

ISKCON, Hindu Union of Mombasa and HSS (RSS) are the main contributors to the society in large by organizing public events and introducing many welfare programs such as the food relief programs and other services which has attracted many Kenyans and created a good reputation of the Hindu community at large.

Pushtimarg Vaishnav Sangh and Brahma Kumaris are also active in Kenya.

=== Temples ===
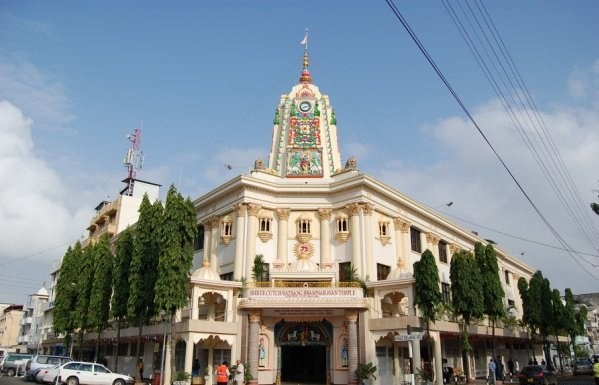
SCSS Swaminarayan Temple in Mombasa.

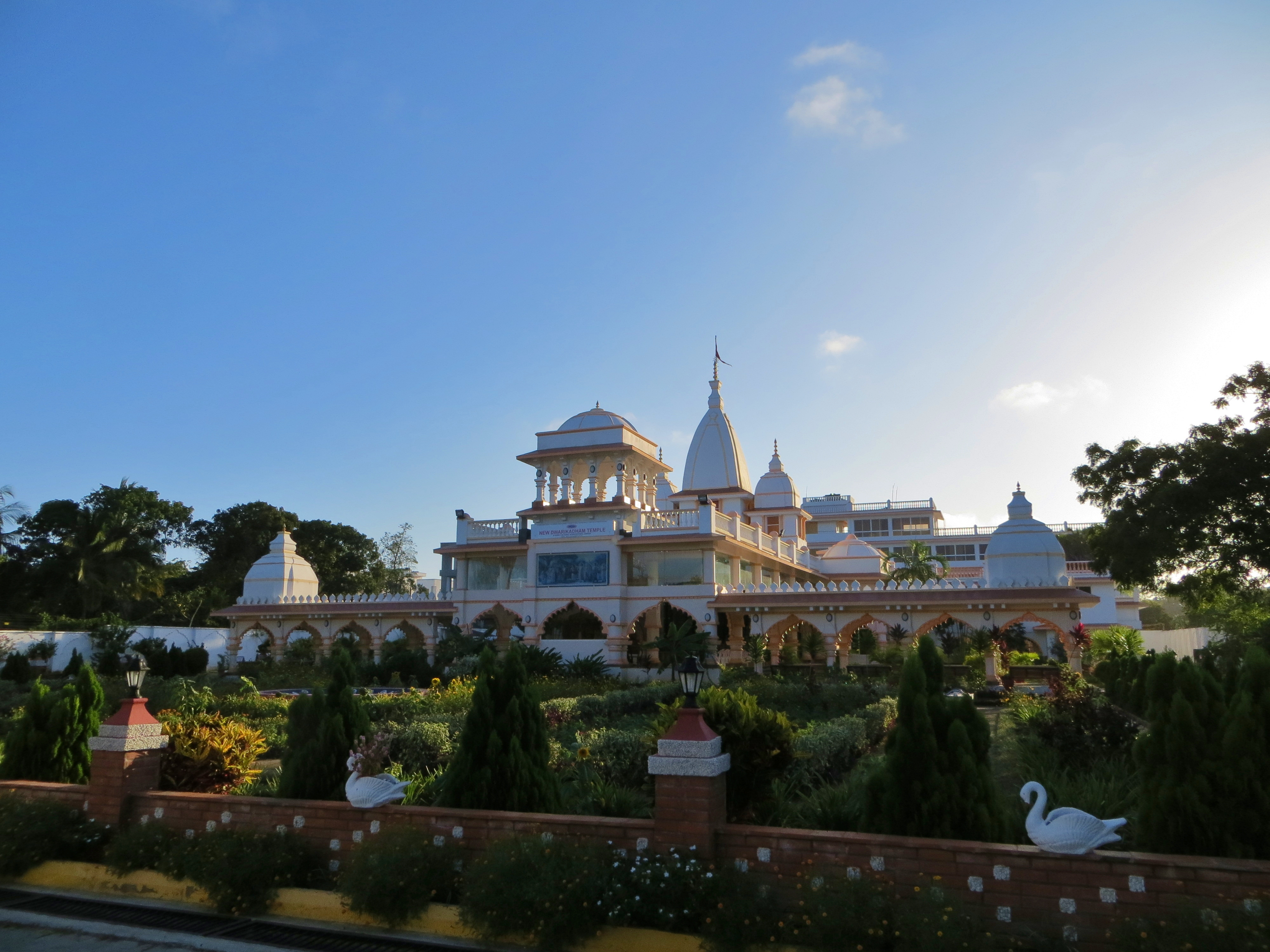
Hare Krishna Temple in Mombasa.

There are more than 15 Hindu temples in Kenya, including Shri Swaminarayan Mandir, Nairobi (EASS Temple) and BAPS Shri Swaminarayan Mandir Nairobi.

== Hindu Organisations ==
The Hindu Council of Kenya is an umbrella body for Hindus in Kenya. The Council is recognized by the Government. Until a few years back, the Hindus were described in the voters' register as 'non-Muslims'. Due to the efforts of the Council, they are now described as 'Hindus'. The Council provides a syllabus and books for Hindu religious education. The Hindu Union of Mombasa is one of the oldest Hindu organizations in Kenya, being established in 1899, and is home to a large community of Hindus on the coast of Kenya. Hindu Swayamsevak Sangh (HSS) is part of Rashtriya Swayamsevak Sangh. HSS was established in 1947 in Nairobi, and since then it has developed and has its centres in different cities like Mombasa, Nakuru, Eldoret, Kisumu and Meru. Its main aims are preserve, practice and promote Hindu ideals and values and maintain Hindu cultural identities. HSS carries out many humanitarian activities such as feeding the needy, providing wheel chairs and artificial limbs to amputees, organizing free medical services and blood donation, and is also known for its tree planting program.

== Gallery ==
Statue of Lord Shiva at Hindu Union.

Art of Lord Krishna at a Holi function.

Shri Ram darbaar at Hindu Union Mombasa.

Maharudra rituals taking place in Mombasa.

Lord Nandi statue at Lord Shiva temple.

== See also ==
- Hinduism in Sierra Leone
- Hinduism in Ghana
