= Silvanus Nicol-Cole =

Sierra Leonean politician

- Silvanus Nicol-Cole, first row, standing, fifth from left.
- Born: Silvanus Nicol-Cole; 8 August 1920; Lagos, Nigeria
- Died: 31 May 2016 (aged 95); Freetown, Sierra Leone
- Education: Sierra Leone Grammar School, Durham University, University of Oxford
- Occupations: Governor of the Bank of Sierra Leone, Economist

Silvanus Nicol-Cole CMG, OBE (8 August 1920 – 31 May 2016) was a Sierra Leonean banker, economist, and business leader who was the first Sierra Leonean governor of the Bank of Sierra Leone.

Nicol-Cole previously served as the deputy governor of the Bank of Sierra Leone. He also held several high-ranking positions at the International Monetary Fund.

== Early life ==
Silvanus Nicol-Cole was born on 8 August 1920, to Sierra Leonean parents of Creole origin in Nigeria. He was the eldest child of Joseph B. Cole and Evelyn M. Cole, née Nicol.

The Nicol-Cole family were originally from Wilberforce Village, Sierra Leone.

=== Education ===
He was educated at the Sierra Leone Grammar School.

He was subsequently educated at Durham University and Oxford University.

== Bank governor and international economist ==
Nicol-Cole served as deputy governor of the Bank of Sierra Leone between 1962 and 1966. Subsequently, he served as governor of the Bank of Sierra Leone between 1966 and 1970.

He was an alternate executive director for the International Monetary Fund between 1970 and 1972 and an executive director of the International Monetary Fund.

== Recognition ==
In 1966 he was awarded an OBE for his services as deputy governor of the Bank of Sierra Leone.

In 1971 he was subsequently awarded a CMG for his services as governor of the Bank of Sierra Leone.
