= Afrik Air Links =

Sierra Leone airline (1991–2005)

IATA	ICAO	Call sign
-	AFK	AFRICA LINKS
- Founded: 1991
- Ceased operations: 2005
- Fleet size: 1
- Headquarters: Freetown, Sierra Leone

Afrik Air Links was a privately owned airline based in Freetown, Sierra Leone, operating chartered flights within West Africa. The airline was founded in 1991, and ceased in 2005.

The airline's fleet consisted of Soviet built aircraft, including the Yakovlev Yak-40, and the Tupolev Tu-134A.
