= Sport in Sierra Leone =

Sports are an important part of Sierra Leonean society and Football is the most played sport in the country. Athletics, basketball, boxing and cricket are also common sports in the country. Sierra Leone became the first African country to join International Floorball Federation.

== Football ==
Football is by far the most popular sport in Sierra Leone. The Sierra Leone national football team, governed by the Sierra Leone Football Association, is popularly known as the Leone Stars and represents the country in international football competitions. Though the team has never qualified for the FIFA World Cup, they did participate in the 1994 and 1996 African Cup of Nations.

== Basketball ==
The Sierra Leone national basketball team represents Sierra Leone in international men's basketball competitions and is controlled by the Sierra Leone Basketball Federation. The squad is mostly home-based, with few foreign-based players.

== Cricket ==
The Sierra Leone cricket team represents the country Sierra Leone in international cricket matches. They became an affiliate member of the International Cricket Council in 2002. They made their international debut at the 2004 African Affiliates Championship, finishing last out of the eight teams. They returned at the equivalent tournament in 2006, Division Three of the African region of the World Cricket League, where they had a major improvement, finishing as runners-up to Mozambique, and only just missing out on promotion to Division Two.

== Scuba diving and sport fishing ==
Watersports and recreational activities in the recent years have brought about a dynamic presence of Scuba Diving and Sport Fishing. Historical shipwrecks can be explored in shallow waters while the vibrant aquatic life makes a colorful dive. The dense fish stock encourages anglers from around the world to try their luck with world record catches. The best area for scuba diving and sport fishing is Banana Island.

== Yoga ==
As of 2014, yoga "is becoming increasingly popular," thanks to the efforts of an organization called "Yoga Strength" headed by Tamba Fayla, a former child soldier who has become "the country's first qualified yoga teacher".

== Sierra Leoneans abroad ==
Many Sierra Leonean diaspora are involved in professional sports.

Active Sierra Leonean diaspora include Mohamed Sanu of the Atlanta Falcons and Kei Kamara of the Colorado Rapids.

Another prominent sportsperson is Madieu Williams. Williams, who was born in Sierra Leone in 1981, is an American football starting safety with the Minnesota Vikings in the United States.

== See also ==
- Sierra Leone at the Olympics
