= Islam in Sierra Leone =

Islam is the largest and majority religion in Sierra Leone. Based on the 2015 Pew Research Center research, 78% of Sierra Leone's population is Muslim. The vast majority of Sierra Leonean Muslims are adherents of Sunni Islam.

== Composition and practice ==
In 2020, 77% of Sierra Leone population are Muslims. There are 16 ethnic groups in Sierra Leone, the two largest being the Temne and Mende are both Muslim majority. Ten of Sierra Leone's sixteen ethnic groups are Muslim majority.

The vast majority of Sierra Leonean Muslims are Sunni of the Maliki school of Jurisprudence.

== History ==
The earliest presence of Islam in the region dates back to when Muslim merchants from the Mali Empire migrated to the northern areas of modern Sierra Leone. Islam began rapidly spreading around the 18th and 19th centuries as Mandé merchants formed social and economic relationships with locals (like the Temne) along with creating religious institutions for the practice of the faith. These factors led to conversions while the religion grew in cultural influence, which would serve as an impetus for further conversions. During the period of British rule, attempts to slow down or halt the spread of Islam were mostly ineffective.

Islam continued to spread after independence in 1961. In 1960, the Muslim population was 35 percent and grew to 60 percent by 2000, and then to 71% in 2008. It is difficult for people from Sierra Leone to travel to Mecca for the Hajj, the fifth pillar of Islam, due to the distance between the two places and the cost of travel being beyond the means of most Sierra Leoneans. The 2014-2016 Ebola crisis worsened the situation by making it impossible for Sierra Leoneans to obtain Visas to Saudi Arabia.

The recent Sierra Leone Civil War was secular in nature featuring members of Christian, Muslim, and Tribal faiths fighting on both sides of the conflict.

== See also ==
- Ahmadiyya in Sierra Leone
- Christianity in Sierra Leone
- Hinduism in Sierra Leone
