= Bloom Bank Africa =

Pan-African banking institution

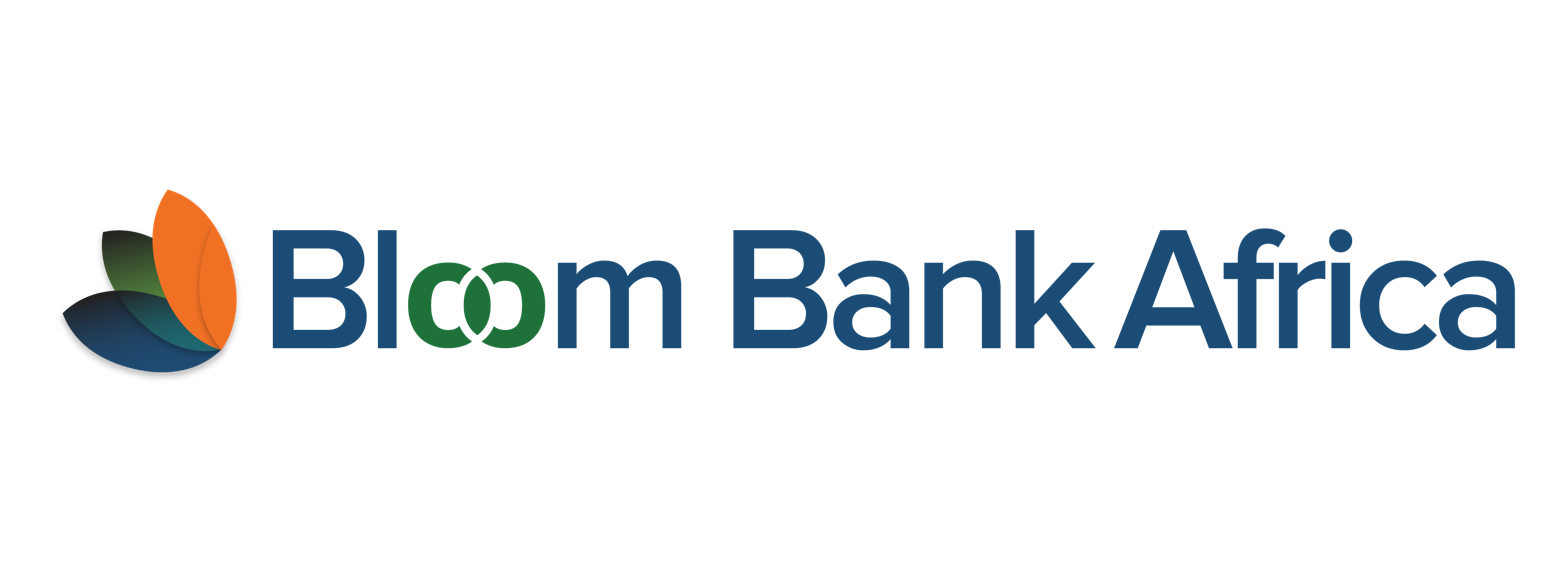
- Type: Private
- Industry: Banking, Financial Services
- Founded: 2019
- Founder: Oakwood Africa Investments Limited (OAIL)
- Area served: Gambia, Sierra Leone, Liberia (expanding across Africa)
- Key people: Alfred Amoah - CEO - Bloom Bank Africa Gambia Limited Lekan Balogun - CEO - Bloom Bank Africa Liberia Limited Oluwole Shodiyan - CEO - Bloom Bank Africa Sierra Leone Limited
- Products: Banking services, Trade Finance, SME Banking, Digital Banking
- Website: bloombankafrica.com

Bloom Bank Africa is a Pan-African banking group committed to advancing prosperity through reliable, innovative, and inclusive financial services. Operating currently across The Gambia, Sierra Leone, and Liberia, the bank focuses on facilitating trade, financial flows, and capital distribution across Africa, aligning with the objectives of the African Continental Free Trade Area (AfCFTA).

== History and Expansion ==
Bloom Bank Africa was established to support businesses and institutions by providing capital, technology, and financial expertise.

In The Gambia, the bank acquired Skye Bank Gambia and rebranded it as Bloom Bank Africa Gambia Limited in 2019.

In Sierra Leone, the bank rebranded from Keystone Bank to Bloom Bank Africa Sierra Leone Limited.

In Liberia, the bank rebranded from Global Bank Liberia Limited to Bloom Bank Africa Liberia Limited.

The bank has plans for further expansion into Francophone West Africa and other African markets over the next five years.

== Operations ==
Bloom Bank Africa operates as a full-service financial institution with a focus on retail, corporate, and trade finance banking.

=== Bloom Bank Africa Gambia ===
- Provides retail and corporate banking solutions tailored to the Gambian market.
- Offers trade finance, SME banking, and digital banking solutions.

=== Bloom Bank Africa Sierra Leone ===
- Focuses on financial inclusion and economic empowerment.
- Supports small and medium-sized enterprises (SMEs) and corporate clients through tailored financing solutions.
- Engages in government-backed financial initiatives**.

=== Bloom Bank Africa Liberia ===
- Provides consumer lending, business financing, and trade support services.
- Works on financial inclusion initiatives to enhance banking accessibility in Liberia.

== Governance ==
Each subsidiary of Bloom Bank Africa has a separate board of directors, ensuring localized governance and regulatory compliance.
