= Hinduism in Sierra Leone =

Hinduism in Sierra Leone is the religion of some South Asian expatriates. Hindus in Sierra Leone are primarily of South Asian descent and are usually traders. There are 4,400 Hindus (0.05%) in Sierra Leone as of 2025, according to ARDA.

Freetown, the capital and principal city of Sierra Leone, has a large Hindu community, including a Hindu association and a priest. Hindus are allowed cremation in Freetown.

Following the exodus of expatriates in 1999 during the Sierra Leone civil war, the Indian community numbers dwindled to about 1500, mostly businessmen of Sindhi origin.

== Demographics ==
Historical Population
Year	Pop.	±%
2001	4,750	—
2007	1,942	−59.1%
2015	3,550	+82.8%
2025	4,400	+23.9%

Year	Percent	Increase
2001	0.1%	-
2007	0.04%	-0.6
2015	0.05%	+0.01
2025	0.05%	-

== Temples ==
There is a functioning Hindu temple in Freetown. It is run by the local Temple Committee.

== See also ==
- Hinduism in Kenya
- Hinduism in Togo
- Hinduism in Africa
