= Public holidays in Sierra Leone =

This is a list of holidays in Sierra Leone. National holidays are non-working days only, and employers have to give workers the day off but they do not have to pay them. Businesses are not required to close.

== Public holidays ==
| Date | Name | Description |
|---|---|---|
| January 1 | New Year's Day | |
| February 18 | Armed Forces Day | In 2002 President Alhaji Ahmad Tejan Kabbah officially declared the End of the Sierra Leone Civil War |
| March 8 | International Women's Day | Women's Day |
| April 27 | Independence Day | From the United Kingdom, 1961 |
| May 1 | Labour Day | International Workers' Day |
| December 25 | Christmas Day | |
| December 26 | Boxing Day | |
| Friday of Holy Week; March or April | Good Friday | Crucifixion of Jesus |
| Monday after Easter; March or April | Easter Monday | Christian Feast of the Resurrection |
| 1 Shawwal | Korité | End of Ramadan, Muslim Breaking of the Fast |
| 10 Dhu al-Hijjah | Tabaski | Muslim Feast of the Sacrifice |
| 12 Rabi' al-awwal | Mawlid | Prophet Mohammed's Birthday |
