= Banking in Sierra Leone =

Banking in Sierra Leone consists of a central bank, the Bank of Sierra Leone, seven commercial banks, and six community banks.

== Banking sector ==
The Civil War destroyed many of the branches of the country's commercial banks and as of 2005 there were 34 commercial bank branches, the majority in the major towns. Procedures for obtaining loans have been assessed as very complicated and there is a relatively low ratio of private credit to GDP at just over four percent.

== Community Banks ==
Community banks play the role of extended financial services to local communities which are not able to access the commercial banks. They are also designed to help development within Sierra Leone by supporting the government's microfinancing program and by empowering local communities.

Community Banks
Name	Founded	District
Zimmi Community bank	June 2005	Zimmi, Pujehun District
Kabala Community bank	July 2008	Kabala, Koinadugu District
Marampa Masimera Community Bank		
Yoni Community Bank Ltd		
Mattru Community Bank Ltd	July 2004	Mattru Jong, Bonthe District
Segbwema Community Bank Ltd	February 2005	Segbwema, Kailahun District

== See also ==
- List of banks in Sierra Leone
