= Economy of Sierra Leone =

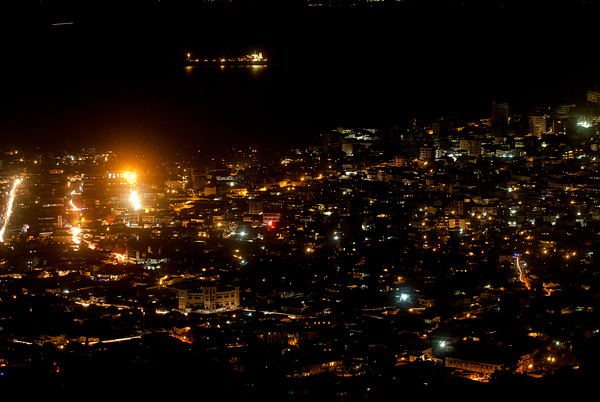
- Capital of Sierra leone
- Currency: Sierra Leonean leone
- Fiscal year: Calendar Year
- Trade organisations: AU, AfCFTA, African Development Bank, ECOWAS, MRU, World Bank, IMF, WTO, Group of 77
- Country group: Least developed; Low-income economy

Statistics
- GDP: ▲$8.39 billion (nominal; 2025); ▲$32.51 billion (PPP; 2025)
- GDP rank: 154th (nominal; 2025); 150th (PPP; 2025)
- GDP growth: ▲4.7% (2025); ▲4.9% (2026f); ▲4.7% (2027f); ▲4.6% (2028f)
- GDP per capita: ▲$915 (nominal; 2025); ▲$3,550 (PPP; 2025)
- GDP per capita rank: 176th (nominal; 2025); 165th (PPP; 2025)
- GDP by sector: agriculture: 51.5%; industry:14.9%; services: 33.6%; (2012 est.)
- Inflation (CPI): 16.862% (2018 est.)
- Population below national poverty line: 52.9% (2011); 40.1% on less than $1.90/day (2018)
- Gini coefficient: 35.7 medium (2018)
- Human Development Index: ▲0.458 low (2024) (181st); 0.282 low IHDI (2018)
- Labour force: 3.102 million (2018 est.)
- Unemployment: N/A
- Main industries: diamonds mining, small-scale manufacturing (cigarettes, beverages, textiles, footwear), petroleum refining, commercial ship repair

External
- Exports: ▲$1.704 billion (153rd) (2018 est.)
- Export goods: diamonds, rutile, cocoa, coffee, fish
- Main export partners: China 50.9%; Belgium 18.1%; Japan 7.9%; Turkey 5.9%; Netherlands 4.5%; Indonesia 4.5%; (2012 est.)
- Imports: ▲$2.309 billion (172nd) (2012 est.)
- Import goods: machinery, fuel, lubricants, chemicals, food
- Main import partners: China 18.4%; India 12.1%; South Africa 8.1%; United States 7.6%; United Kingdom 6.6%; Ivory Coast 5.6%; Belgium 4.5%; (2012 est.)
- FDI stock: ▲$2.644 billion (94th) (31 December 2018 est.)
- Gross external debt: ▲$3.425 billion (158th) (31 December 2018 est.)

Public finance
- Government debt: ▼42.8% of GDP (2024)
- Revenue: $510.2 million (2012 est.)
- Spending: $728.5 million (2012 est.)
- All values, unless otherwise stated, are in US dollars.

Sierra Leone has a developing economy. It generates $8.39 billion by gross domestic product as of 2025. Since the end of the Sierra Leone Civil War in 2002, the economy is gradually recovering with a gross domestic product growth rate between 4 and 7%. In 2024, the IMF ranked it the 149th largest economy in the world by PPP.

Sierra Leone's economic development has always been hampered by an overdependence on mineral exploitation. Successive governments and the population as a whole have always believed that "diamonds and gold" are sufficient generators of foreign currency earnings and lure for investment.

As a result, large scale agriculture of commodity products, industrial development and sustainable investments have been neglected by governments. The economy could thus be described as one which is "exploitative" - a rentier state - and based upon the extraction of unsustainable resources or non-reusable assets.

Two-thirds of the population of Sierra Leone are directly involved in subsistence agriculture. Agriculture accounted for 58 percent national GDP in 2007.

== Economic history ==
This is a chart of trend of gross domestic product of Sierra Leone at market prices estimated by the International Monetary Fund and EconStats with figures in millions of Sierra Leones.

Year	Gross Domestic Product
1965	246
1970	355
1975	572
1980	1,155
1985	4,365
1990	98,386
1995	657,604
2000	1,330,429

Current GDP per capita of Sierra Leone grew 32% in the 1960s, reaching a peak growth of 107% in the 1970s. But this proved unsustainable and it consequently shrank by 52% in the 1980s and a further 10% in the 1990s.

The mean wage was US$0.32 per hour in 2009.

== Economic sectors ==
Percentage of GDP by sector (2007)
Rank	Sector	Percentage of GDP
1	Agriculture	58.5
2	Other Services	10.4
3	Trade and tourism	9.5
4	Wholesale and retail trade	9.0
5	Mining and quarying	4.5
6	Government Services	4.0
7	Manufacturing and handicrafts	2.0
8	Construction	1.7
9	Electricity and water	0.4

=== Agriculture ===
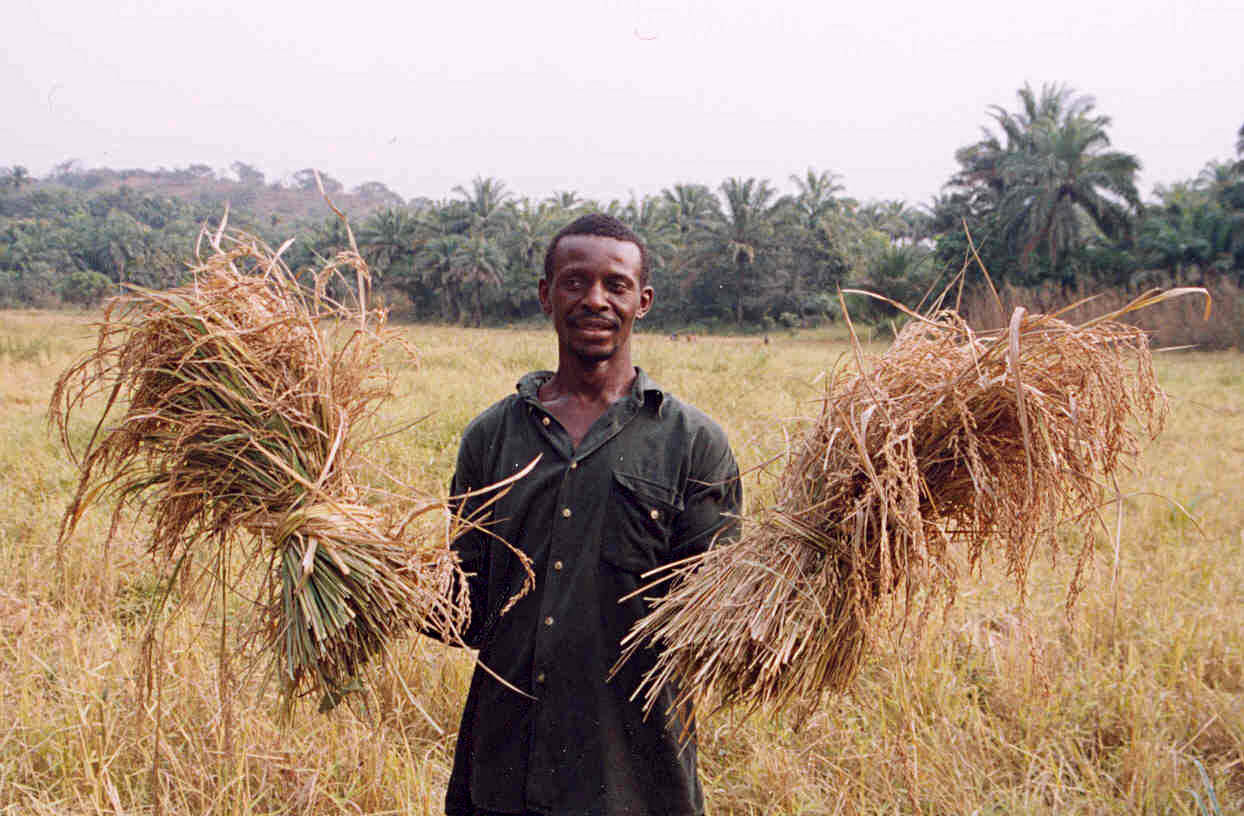
A farmer with his rice harvest in Sierra Leone

Two-thirds of the population of Sierra Leone are directly involved in subsistence agriculture. Agriculture accounted for 58 percent national Gross Domestic Product (GDP) in 2007.

Agriculture is the largest employer with 80 percent of the population working in the sector. Rice is the most important staple crop in Sierra Leone with 85 percent of farmers cultivating rice during the rainy season and an annual consumption of 76 kg per person.

=== Mining ===
Rich in minerals, Sierra Leone has relied on the mining sector in general, and diamonds in particular, for its economic base. In the 1970s and early 1980s, economic growth rate slowed because of a decline in the mining sector. Financially disadvantageous exchange rates and government budget deficits led to sizable balance-of-payments deficits and inflation.

Certain policy responses to external factors as well as implementations of aid projects and maintenance have led to a general decline in economic activity and a serious degradation of economic infrastructures. Sierra Leone's short-term prospects depend upon continued adherence to International Monetary Fund programs and continued external assistance.

=== Tourism ===
According to the International Labour Organization, approximately 8,000 Sierra Leoneans are employed in the tourism industry, with a growing number of jobs expected to be created in the future. The main entrance point is Freetown International Airport, where transport to and from has been problematic. The main attractions for tourist in Sierra Leone are the beaches, nature reserves and mountains.

== Infrastructure ==
=== Transport ===
Because of widespread poverty, high petroleum prices and a large portion of the population residing in small communities, walking is often the preferred method of transportation in Sierra Leone. There are 11,700 kilometres (7,270 mi) of highway in Sierra Leone, of which 936 km (582 mi) are paved.

There are 800 km (497 mi) of waterways in Sierra Leone, of which 600 km (373 mi) are navigable year-round. Major ports of Sierra Leone include: Bonthe, Freetown and Pepel. Queen Elizabeth II Quay in Freetown represents the country's only deep water port facility capable of berthing large-hulled cargo or military vessels.

There are ten airports in Sierra Leone, of which one - Lungi International Airport in Freetown - has a paved runway in excess of 3000m in length. Of the remaining airports, all of which have unpaved runways, seven have runways of lengths between 914 and 1,523 m (2,999 and 4,997 ft); the remaining two having runways of shorter length. There are two heliports in the country.

=== Energy ===
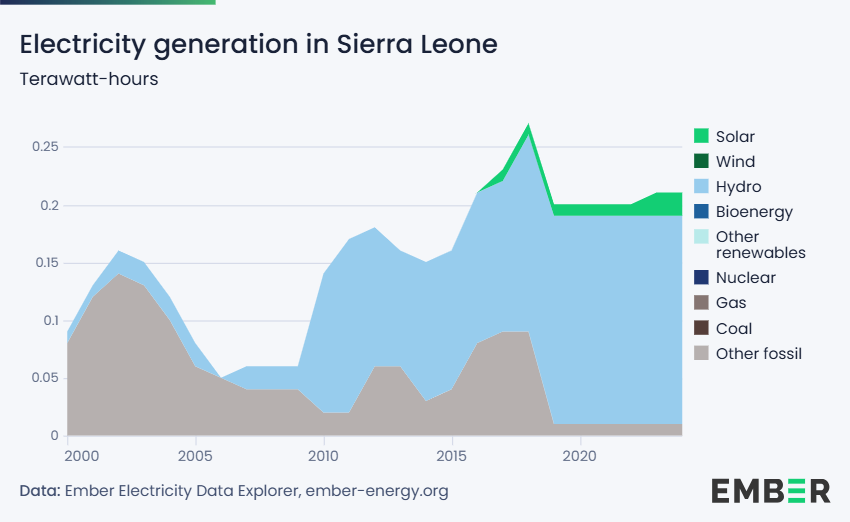
Electricity generation in Sierra Leone in terawatt-hours

As of 2016, about 12% of the population of Sierra Leone had access to electricity. Of that 12%, 10% was in Freetown, and the remaining 90% of the country used 2% of the nation's electricity. The majority of the population relies on biomass fuels, with firewood and coal used most prevalently. The burning of these sources has been reported to have adverse health effects on women and children. The use of coal and firewood has also posed environmental concerns as they are both in conflict with the push for more sustainable sources of energy. As a result, the commercialisation of firewood and coal has been a point of contention with aid donors and government agencies. There have been strong pushes for both solar and hydropower to become the dominant sources of energy. Sierra Leone's tropical climate, heavy annual rainfall, and abundance of rivers give it the potential to pursue more solar and hydropower alternatives.

In conjunction with the UK's Department for International Development (DFID), Sierra Leone set a goal to provide solar power to all its citizens by 2025. It aimed provide solar power to at least 50,000 homes in 2016, 250,000 homes by 2017, and 1,000,000 people by 2020. This initiative falls under the Energy Africa access campaign. Before this compact agreement, Sierra Leone's private sector for solar energy was weak, as it provided energy to less than 5% of the target population. Part of the reason for this was the import duties, taxes, and lack of quality control. To ensure that the Energy Africa goal is met, Sierra Leone has agreed to remove its import duties and Value Added Tax (VAT) on certified solar products. It is estimated that there will be a 30% to 40% cost reduction on solar products with the lack of duties and taxes.

As of 2012, Sierra Leone has three main hydroelectric plants: the Guma plant, which was decommissioned in 1982; the Dodo Plant, in the Eastern Province; and the Bumbuna plant. There is also potential for several new hydroelectric plants to open on the Sewa River, Pampana River, Seli River, Moa River, and Little Scarcies. The Bumbuna dam is the largest and was estimated to produce about 50 megawatts of electricity. It has been projected that the Bumbuna dam could reduce the amount of spending on foreign fuel and save the country at least $2 million a month.

=== Telecommunications ===
Radio is the most-popular and most-trusted media source in Sierra Leone, with 72% of people in the country listening to the radio daily. Sierra Leone is home to one government-owned national radio station and roughly two dozen private radio stations, as well as one government-owned and one private TV station.

Telephone and telegraph services are marginal, but improving. Internet usage is low, reaching just 1.3% of the population in 2012, but improving with growth in 3G mobile cellular data services and the mid-2011 arrival of the ACE international fiber-optic cable system in Freetown.

== Trade and investment ==
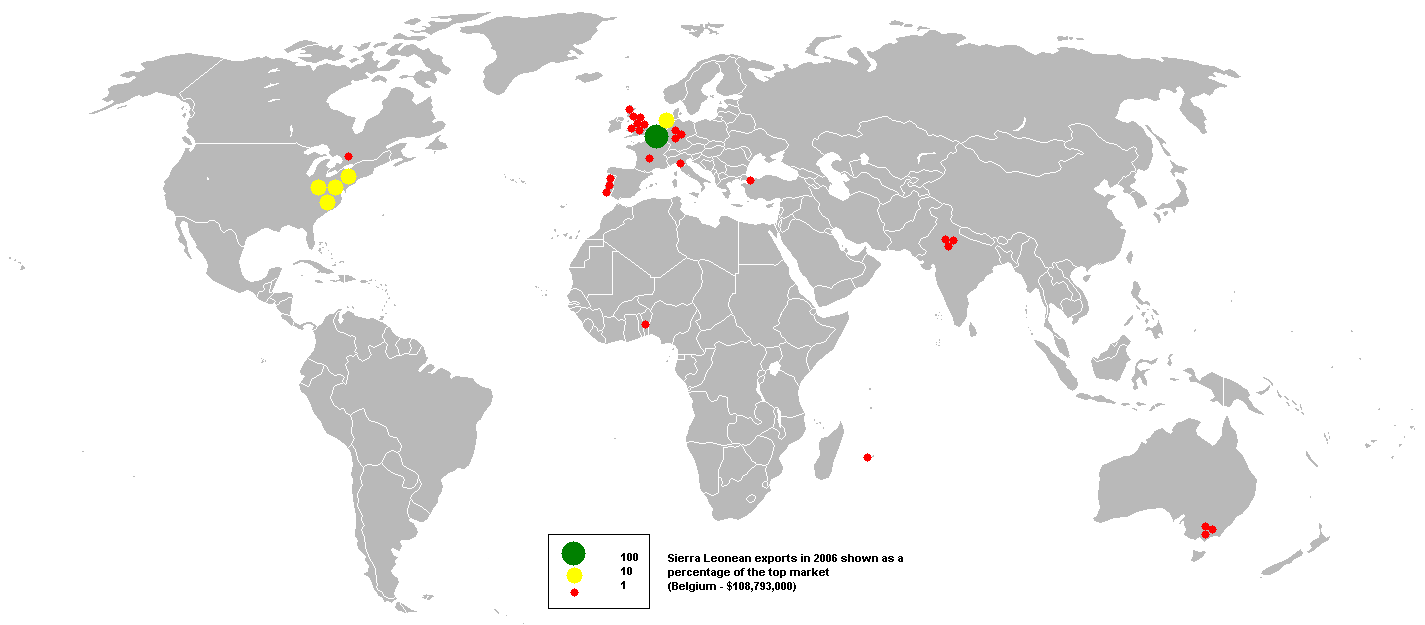
Sierra Leonean exports in 2006.

Exports of Sierra Leone by product category (2019) Chemical products Transportation Machines Mineral products Plastics and rubbers Metals Foodstuffs Precious metals Textiles Instruments Animal products Vegetable products Paper goods Footwear and headwear Miscellaneous Stone and glass Wood products Animal and vegetable bi-products Animal hides Arts and antiques Weapons

Mineral exports remain Sierra Leone's principal foreign exchange earner. Sierra Leone is a major producer of gem-quality diamonds. Though rich in this resource, the country has historically struggled to manage its exploitation and export. Annual production estimates range between $70–$250 million; however, only a fraction of that passes through formal export channels (1999: $1.2 million; 2000: $16 million; 2001: projections $25 million). The balance is smuggled out and has been used to finance rebel activities in the region, money laundering, arms purchases, and financing of other illicit activities, leading some to characterize Sierra Leone's diamonds as a "conflict resource."

Recent efforts on the part of the country to improve the management of the export trade have met with some success. In October 2000, a new UN-approved export certification system for exporting diamonds from Sierra Leone was put into place that led to a dramatic increase in legal exports. In 2001, the Government of Sierra Leone created a mining community development fund, which returns a portion of diamond export taxes to diamond mining communities. The fund was created to raise local communities' stake in the legal diamond trade.

Sierra Leone has one of the world's largest deposits of rutile, a titanium ore used as paint pigment and welding rod coatings. Sierra Rutile Limited, fully owned by Nord Resources of the United States, began commercial mining operations near Bonthe in early 1979. Sierra Rutile was then the largest non-petroleum U.S. investment in West Africa. The export of 88,000 tons realized $75 million for the country in 1990.

The company and the Government of Sierra Leone concluded a new agreement on the terms of the company's concession in Sierra Leone in 1990. Rutile and bauxite mining operations were suspended when rebels invaded the mining sites in 1995. Negotiations for reactivation of rutile and bauxite mining are in progress. The U.S. interest in the company has been reduced to 25%.

Since independence, the Government of Sierra Leone has encouraged foreign investment, although the business climate suffers from uncertainty and a shortage of foreign exchange because of civil conflicts. Investors are protected by an agreement that allows for arbitration under the 1965 World Bank Convention. Legislation provides for transfer of interest, dividends, and capital.

=== Central Asia ===
On 8 April 2025, Sierra Leone’s Minister of Foreign Affairs, Timothy Musa Kabba, paid his first official visit to Kazakhstan, where he met with Deputy Prime Minister and Foreign Minister Murat Nurtleu. The two countries agreed to enhance cooperation in trade, transport and logistics, healthcare, agriculture, and IT. Kazakhstan, a major global grain producer, proposed using the Trans-Caspian International Transport Route to supply African markets with food products. Additionally, the Kazakhstan Agency for International Development shared elements of its e-Government platform with Sierra Leone, building on a prior memorandum of understanding. A Roadmap for Cooperation between the foreign ministries was signed, and Sierra Leone also supported Kazakhstan’s initiative to establish a UN Regional Center for Sustainable Development Goals in Almaty.

== Currency and central bank ==
The currency is the SLE. The central bank of the country is the Bank of Sierra Leone, which is in the capital, Freetown. The government operates a floating exchange rate system, and foreign currencies can be exchanged at any of the commercial banks, recognized foreign exchange bureaux, and most hotels. Credit card use is limited in Sierra Leone, though it may be used at some hotels and restaurants. There are a few internationally linked automated teller machines that accept Visa cards in Freetown operated by ProCredit Bank.

== Membership of international economic bodies ==
Sierra Leone is a member of the Economic Community of West African States (ECOWAS). With Liberia and Guinea, it formed the Mano River Union (MRU) customs union, primarily designed to implement development projects and promote regional economic integration. Sierra Leone is also a member of the WTO.

== Data ==
=== Main indicators ===
The following table shows the main economic indicators in 1980-2026. Inflation below 5% is in green.

Year	GDP			GDP growth (real)	Inflation	Government debt (% of GDP)
Year	Total (bil. US$ PPP)	Per capita (US$ PPP)	Total (bil. US$ nominal)	GDP growth (real)	Inflation	Government debt (% of GDP)
1980	4.8	1354	2.7	▼ -0.6	▲12.9	n/a
1985	▲6.0	▲1541	▲2.8	▼ -6.7	▲76.6	n/a
1990	▲7.8	▲1809	▼1.5	▲1.6	▲110.9	n/a
1995	▼6.8	▼1588	▲2.0	▼ -10.0	▲26.0	n/a
2000	▼4.4	▼949	▼1.5	▲3.8	▲ -0.9	n/a
2005	▲9.3	▲1682	▲2.7	▲6.7	▲13.7	▲113.5
2006	▲10.0	▲1774	▲3.1	▲4.6	▲10.5	▼61.9
2007	▲10.6	▲1849	▲3.5	▲3.7	▲17.0	▼26.4
2008	▲11.3	▲1909	▲3.9	▲3.8	▲8.2	▲46.1
2009	▲11.5	▼1894	▼3.8	▲1.3	▲7.5	▼31.1
2010	▲12.8	▲2053	▲4.2	▲10.1	▲7.2	▼28.9
2011	▲14.0	▲2187	▲4.8	▲7.1	▲6.8	▼25.8
2012	▲15.2	▲2318	▲5.7	▲6.7	▲6.6	▼24.1
2013	▲16.9	▲2517	▲6.7	▲9.4	▲5.5	▼22.3
2014	▲17.1	▼2485	▼6.5	▼ -0.6	▲4.6	▲26.8
2015	▼16.7	▼2375	▲6.8	▼ -3.1	▲6.7	▲28.4
2016	▲17.7	▲2452	▼6.0	▲4.7	▲10.9	▲38.9
2017	▲18.7	▲2533	▼5.8	▲3.9	▲18.2	▲44.2
2018	▲19.9	▲2640	▲6.4	▲3.4	▲16.0	44.2
2019	▲20.9	▲2704	▲6.5	▲5.5	▲14.8	▲45.3
2020	▲21.5	▲2719	▲6.7	▼ -1.3	▲13.4	▲46.4
2021	▲23.1	▲2849	▲7.2	▲5.9	▲11.9	▲47.1
2022	▲26.0	▲3143	▼7.1	▲5.3	▲27.2	▲54
2023	▲28.5	▲3371	▼6.4	▲5.7	▲47.7	▼49.4
2024	▲30.5	▲3527	▲7.0	▲4.3	▲28.4	▼46.7
2025	▲32.7	▲3710	▲7.7	▲4.4	▲7.6	▼45.2
2026	▲35.2	▲3909	▲8.3	▲4.5	▲7.5	▼44.3

=== Other indicators ===
GDP: purchasing power parity - $11.55 billion (2017 est.)

GDP - real growth rate: 3.7% (2017 est.)

GDP - per capita: $1,600 (2017 est.)

Gross national saving: 10% of GDP (2017 est.)

GDP - composition by sector:
agriculture: 60.7% (2017 est.)
industry: 6.5% (2017 est.)
services: 32.9% (2017 est.)

Population below poverty line:: 70.2% (2004 est.)

Distribution of family income - Gini index: 34 (2011)

Inflation rate (consumer prices): 18.2% (2017 est.)

Labor force: 2.972 million (2017 est.)

Labor force - by occupation:
agriculture: 61.1% (2014 est.)
industry: 5.5% (2014 est.)
services: 33.4% (2014 est.)

Unemployment rate: 15% (2017 est.)

Budget:
revenues: 562 million (2017 est.)
expenditures: 846.4 million (2017 est.)

Budget surplus (+) or deficit (-): -7.9% (of GDP) (2017 est.)

Public debt: 63.9% of GDP (2017 est.)

Industries: diamond mining; iron ore, rutile and bauxite mining; small-scale manufacturing (beverages, textiles, footwear)

Industrial production growth rate: 15.5% (2017 est.)

electrification: total population: 5% (2013)

electrification: urban areas: 11% (2013)

electrification: rural areas: 1% (2013)

Electricity - production: 300 million kWh (2016 est.)

Electricity - production by source:
fossil fuel: 23%
hydro: 51%
nuclear: 0%
other renewable: 26% (2017)

Electricity - consumption: 279 million kWh (2016 est.)

Electricity - exports: 0 kWh (2016 est.)

Electricity - imports: 0 kWh (2016 est.)

Agriculture - products: rice, coffee, cocoa, palm kernels, palm oil, peanuts, cashews; poultry, cattle, sheep, pigs; fish

Exports: $808.4 million (2017 est.)

Exports - commodities: iron ore, diamonds, rutile, cocoa, coffee, fish

Exports - partners: Ivory Coast 37.7%, Belgium 20.5%, US 15.7%, China 10.2%, Netherlands 6.1% (2017)

Imports: $1.107 billion (2017 est.)

Imports - commodities: foodstuffs, machinery and equipment, fuels and lubricants, chemicals

Imports - partners: China 11.5%, US 9.2%, Belgium 8.8%, UAE 7.7%, India 7.4%, Turkey 5.2%, Senegal 5.1%, Netherlands 4.3% (2017)

Debt - external: $1.615 billion (31 December 2017 est.)

Reserves of foreign exchange and gold: $478 million (31 December 2017 est.)

Imports arriving at the port of Freetown must be covered by an Electronic Cargo Tracking Note (ECTN); required under a Sierra Leonean Ministry of Finance memorandum, its reference number must appear on the bill of lading and cargo manifest before the shipping documents are released.

== See also ==
- Extractive industries
- United Nations Economic Commission for Africa
