= Christianity in Sierra Leone =

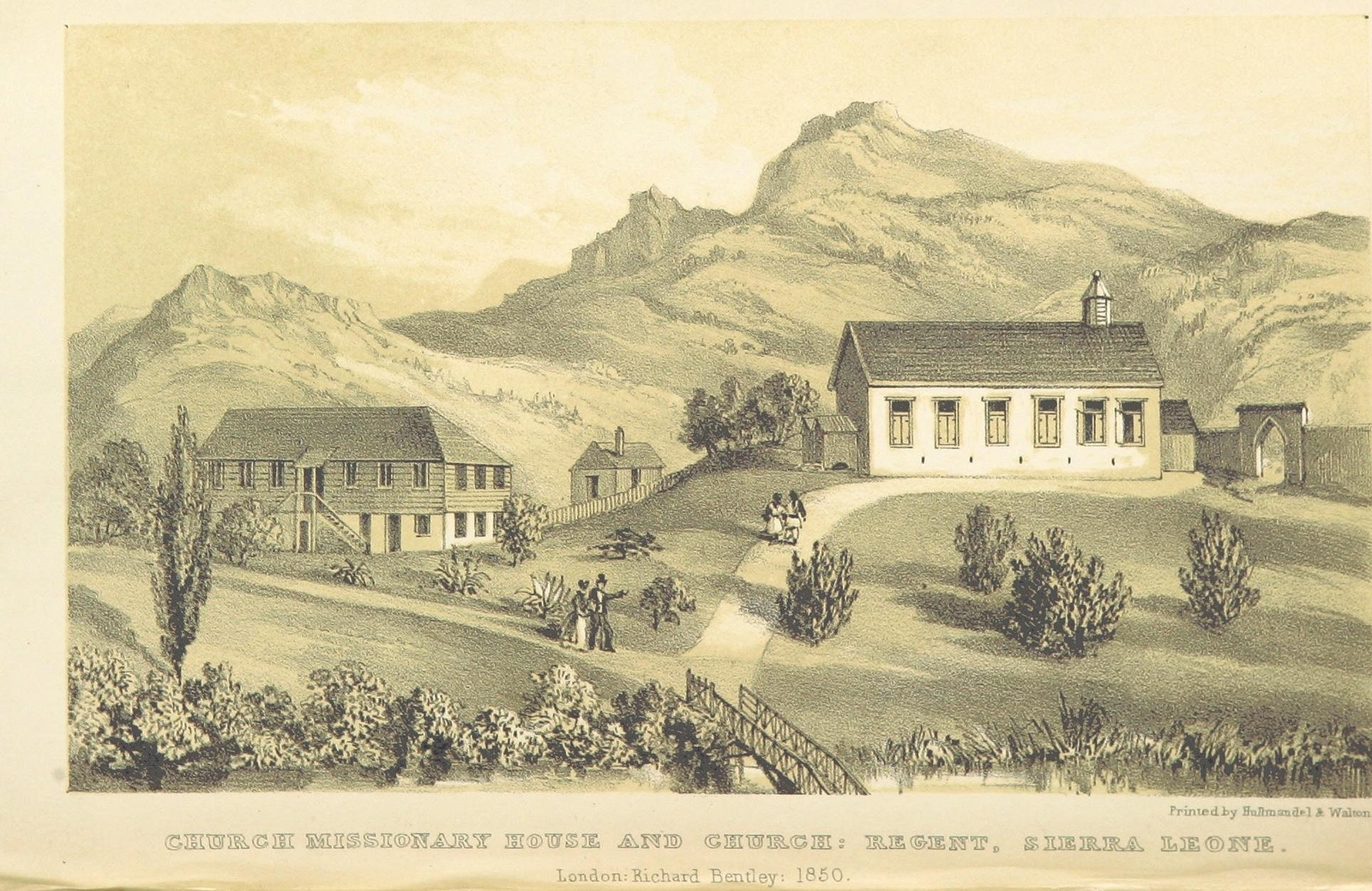
Church and Missionary House in Regent, Sierra Leone (1850)

Christians in Sierra Leone constitute approximately 22.9 percent of the country's population according to a 2019 estimate. Christianity was brought to Sierra Leone by the Nova Scotian Settlers when they founded the Colony of Sierra Leone in March 1792.

The Constitution provides for freedom of religion, and the Sierra Leonean government generally respected this right in practice.

Intermarriage between Muslims and Christians is common. Islam and Christianity are often syncretized with indigenous religious beliefs.

== Protestantism ==
The majority of Sierra Leonean Christians are Protestants, of which the largest are Methodists and Evangelicals.

=== Orange Order influence ===
The Orange Order in Sierra Leone was the earliest expression of the Loyal Orange Institution in Africa. The first lodge in Africa, Freetown Loyal Orange Lodge No. 1955, was established in Freetown during the mid-19th century, introduced by Irish and Ulster Protestant settlers, soldiers, and missionaries serving in the British colonial administration.

Sierra Leone as a British Crown Colony provided a fraternal and religious network for colonial officials, merchants, and African converts associated with Protestant churches, particularly the Church Missionary Society.

== Roman Catholicism ==
Catholics are the second-largest non-Protestant Christians division in Sierra Leone, at about 5% of the country's population.
