= Bank of Sierra Leone =

Monetary authority of Sierra Leone

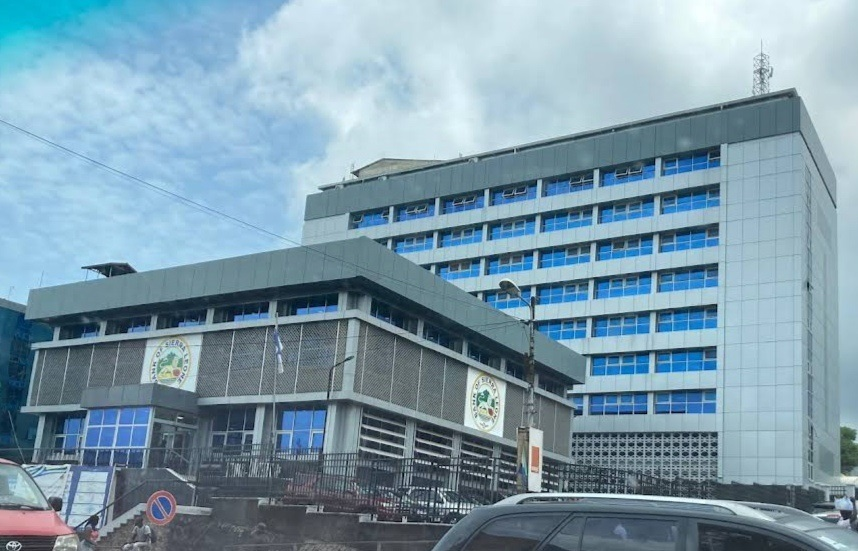
- Central bank of: Sierra Leone
- Headquarters: Freetown, Sierra Leone
- Established: 27 March 1963
- Ownership: 100% state ownership
- Governor: Ibrahim Stevens
- Currency: Leone; SLE (ISO 4217)
- Reserves: 470 million USD
- Website: bsl.gov.sl

The Bank of Sierra Leone is the central bank of Sierra Leone. It issues the country's currency, known as the Leone. The bank formulates and implements monetary policy, including foreign exchange.

== Organisation and activities ==
The current governor of the Bank of Sierra Leone is Ibrahim Stevens, who was appointed by president Julius Maada Bio, and took office on the 16th November 2023 after he was approved by Parliament. The governor of the bank is appointed by the President of Sierra Leone for a term of five years.

The Bank Headquarters is at Siaka Stevens Street in the Central business district in Downtown Freetown.

The Bank is engaged in policies to promote financial inclusion and is a member of the Alliance for Financial Inclusion (AFI). On 20 December 2012, the member institution announced specific commitments toward AFI's Maya Declaration to move further toward the eradication of financial exclusion in Sierra Leone.

== Governors ==
- Gordon E. Hall, 1963–1966
- Silvanus Nicol-Cole, 1966–1970
- Samuel Lansana Bangura, 1970–1979
- Arthur Salaco Christopher Johnson, 1979-1980-?
- Jim Fornah, 1981–1985
- Victor Bruce, 1985–1986
- Abdul Rahman Turay, 1987-1992-?
- Stephen Mustapha Swaray, 1993–1997
- Christian Kargbo, 1997–1998
- James Sanpha Koroma, 1998–2003
- G. Melvin Tucker, acting, 2003
- James David Rogers, 2003–2007
- Samura Kamara, 2007–2009
- Sheku Sambadeen Sesay, 2009–2014
- Momodu Kargbo, 2014–2016
- Kaifala Marah, 2016–2017
- Patrick Saidu Conteh, 2017–2018
- Kelfala M. Kallon, 2018- 2023 [9]
- Dr. Ibrahim L. Stevens, 2023-[10]

== Directors ==
- Dr M.C.F. Easmon, medical doctor, historian, and a founder of the Sierra Leone National Museum, 1964-1968.
- Dr Claude Nelson-Williams, medical doctor, politician, and social crusader, 1964-1967.
- Dr Davidson Nicol, medical doctor, scientist, academic, and diplomat.

== History ==
In order to create an independent economy for the new country, the government drafted legislation to create a central bank and a new currency. The enabling legislation was passed on 27 March 1963 and the bank began operations on 4 August 1964. At the same time, the Leone was introduced to replace the British West African pound, using a decimal system of currency.

== See also ==
- Sierra Leonean leone
- Sierra Leone Ministry of Finance
- Banking in Sierra Leone
- Economy of Sierra Leone
- List of banks in Sierra Leone
- List of central banks of Africa
- List of central banks
