= List of Sierra Leone Creole people =

The list of Sierra Leone Creole people is an incomplete list of notable individuals of Creole ethnicity and ancestry. The Sierra Leone Creole people, who are also referred to as (Krio: Krio people), are the descendants of African-Americans, Jamaican Maroons and Liberated Africans who settled in Freetown between 1787 and around 1885.

This list is ordered by category of human endeavour. Persons who have a Wikipedia article containing references showing that they are of Sierra Leone Creole descent, and have made significant contributions in two fields, are listed in both of the pertinent categories, to facilitate easy look-up.

== Academic figures ==
=== Economists ===
- Yvonne Aki-Sawyerr (born 1967), economist and chartered accountant
- David Omashola Carew, economist and former minister of finance
- Noah Arthur Cox-George (1915–2004), professor of economics and dean at Fourah Bay College
- Omotunde E.G. Johnson (born 1941), economist and senior research associate at the IMF

=== Educational administrators ===
- Hannah Benka-Coker (née: Luke) (1903–1952), educator and founder of Freetown Secondary School for Girls
- Henry Rawlingson Carr (1863–1945), administrator and director of education
- Bertha Conton (1923–2022), educator, and founder of Leone Preparatory School
- William Farquhar Conton (1925–2003), historian, author and chief education officer
- Florence Agnes Dillsworth (1937–2000), former principal of St. Joseph's Convent School and one-time mayor of Freetown
- Cassandra Garber, former headmistress at Freetown Secondary School for Girls and current president of the Krio Descendants Union
- Sam Franklyn Gibson (born 1951), educator and one-time mayor of Freetown
- Lati Hyde-Forster (1911–2001), first African principal of Annie Walsh Memorial School and first female graduate of Fourah Bay College

=== Engineers ===
- Ogunlade Davidson (1949–2022), senior Fulbright fellow, professor of mechanical engineering and dean at Fourah Bay College
- Thomas Frederick Hope (1919–1996), first chief engineer, Guma Valley Water Company and first chairman, Ecobank Transnational Incorporated
- Trudy Morgan (born 1966), first African woman to be awarded a fellowship of the Institution of Civil Engineers

=== Historians ===
- Violet Showers Johnson, professor of history and director of Africana studies at Texas A&M University
- Florence Peters Mahoney (born 1929), Fulbright professor of African history and first Gambian woman to be awarded a PhD
- Arthur Daniel Porter III (1924–2019), author, professor of history and university administrator
- Aaron Belisarius Sibthorpe (c. 1830–1916), nineteenth century historian
- Akintola Gustavus Wyse (died 2002), author and professor of history at Fourah Bay College

=== Humanists and political theorists ===
- Nicholas G.J. Ballanta (born: Nicholas Taylor) (1893–1962), musicologist and Guggenheim Fellow, who pioneered the scientific study of the musical conceptions of African people
- Edward Wilmot Blyden III (1918–2010), political scientist and former dean at Fourah Bay College
- Reginald Akindele Cline-Cole, author, associate professor and developmental geographer
- Delia Jarrett-Macauley (born 1958), multi-disciplinary scholar in history, literature and cultural politics who is a fellow of the Royal Society of Arts
- Victor Okrafo-Smart, author and genealogical researcher
- Abiodun Williams (born 1961), professor of practice and former president of The Hague Institute for Global Justice

=== Legal scholars ===
- James Ayodele Jenkins-Johnston (1946–2017), barrister and legal scholar in Professional Practice and Ethics at the Sierra Leone Law School
- George Gelaga King (1932–2016), former judge and legal scholar at the Sierra Leone Law School who was a Fellow of the Royal Society of Arts
- John Bankole Thompson (1936–2021), judge and former professor in the department of Criminal Justice and Police Studies at Eastern Kentucky University

=== Linguists and literary theorists ===
- Dennis Bright, academic in francophone studies and former director of the Franco-Sierra Leonean Pedagogical Centre
- Gladys Casely-Hayford (1904–1950), poet, playwright and first author to write in the Krio language
- Thomas Decker (1916–1978), linguist, poet, and Krio language revisionist
- Clifford Nelson Fyle (1933–2006), professor of english and co-author of the Krio-English Dictionary
- Lemuel A. Johnson (1941–2002), poet, literary critic and professor of english at the University of Michigan
- Eldred Durosimi Jones (1925–2020), linguist, literary critic, university professor and principal of Fourah Bay College
- Eustace Palmer, literary critic, public orator and professor of english at the University of Texas

=== Scientists ===
- Charles Farrell Easmon (born 1946), professor and clinical director of medical microbiology at St Mary's Hospital Medical School
- Enid Ayodele Forde (1932–2010), geospatial analyst, chair of the geography department at Fourah Bay College and first Sierra Leonean woman to gain a PhD
- Monty Patrick Jones (born 1961), agronomist, research professor and former minister of agriculture, forestry and food security
- Tanniemola Liverpool (born 1971), author and professor of theoretical physics at University of Bristol
- Abioseh Davidson Nicol (1925–1994), physician, biomedical researcher, professor and first Sierra Leonean principal of Fourah Bay College

=== Theologians ===
- Edward Fasholé-Luke (born 1934) academic and Anglican theologian
- Thomas Sylvester Johnson (1873–1955), educator, theologian and former bishop of Sierra Leone
- Lamina Sankoh (born: Etheldred Jones) (1884–1964), cleric, theologian and philosopher who taught at various historically black colleges in the United States
- Harry Alphonso Sawyerr (1909–1986), writer and Anglican theologian

== Actors and actresses ==
- Paul Barber (born 1951), actor best known for his roles in Only Fools and Horses and The Full Monty
- Nzinga Christine Blake (born 1981), actress and winner of the Emmy awards for best executive producer
- Chadwick Boseman (1976–2020), actor and winner of the Golden Globe Awards
- Jeillo Edwards (1942–2004), actress and graduate of the Guildhall School of Music and Drama
- Idris Elba (born 1972), actor and winner of the BET and Golden Globe Awards
- Desmond Finney, actor and nominee for the Zafaa Global Film Awards
- Cornelius Macarthy, actor and winner of the London Independent Film Festival Awards

== Aviators and military figures ==
- Tom Carew, Major-General and former chief of defence staff
- Emmanuel Cole (1907–1972), soldier and hero of the "Gunners Revolt"
- James Pinson Davies (1828–1906), merchant, former British naval officer and later agronomist known as the pioneer of cocoa farming in West Africa
- Adesanya Kwamina Hyde (1915–1993), diplomat and former aviator in the Royal Air Force awarded the Distinguished Flying Cross for acts of valour and courage
- Andrew Juxon-Smith (1931–1996), former commander of the armed forces and head of state of Sierra Leone
- Arthur Nelson-Williams, Brigadier-General and former chief of defence staff
- Richard Akinwande Savage (1903–1993), medical doctor and first West African to serve as a British Army officer
- John Clavell Smythe (1915–1996), former Royal Air Force aviation officer, barrister and attorney-general of Sierra Leone
- Valentine Strasser (born 1967), former army officer and head of state of Sierra Leone
- Emanuel Adeniyi Thomas (1914–1945), first black African to qualify as a pilot and first West African commissioned to serve as a Royal Air Force officer

== Beauty pageant winners and models ==
- Tyrilla Gouldson (born 1984), beauty pageant contestant who represented Sierra Leone at the Miss World 2008
- Enid Jones-Boston (born 1995), model and beauty pageant contestant who represented Sierra Leone at the Miss World 2019
- Twilla Ojukutu-Macauley (born 1967), model and beauty pageant contestant who represented Sierra Leone at the Miss World 1988
- Neyorlyn Melrose Williams (born 1991), model and beauty pageant contestant who represented Sierra Leone at the Miss World 2010
- Vanessa Williams (born 1990), model and beauty pageant contestant who represented Sierra Leone at the Miss World 2012

== Composers ==
- Nicholas G.J. Ballanta (born: Nicholas Taylor) (1893–1962), composer and music scholar
- Avril Coleridge-Taylor (1903–1998), pianist–composer and first female conductor at HMS Royal Marines and the London Symphony Orchestra
- Samuel Coleridge-Taylor (1875–1912), composer and conductor best known for his cantata Hiawatha's Wedding Feast
- Yulisa Amadu Maddy (born: Pat Maddy) (1936–2014), composer, journalist and writer

== Creole-descended families ==
- Awoonor-Renner family
- Davis family
- Easmon family
- Smith family
- Snowball family

== Diplomats ==
- Edward Wilmot Blyden III (1918–2010), diplomat, political scientist and educator
- Collins O. Bright (born 1917), special envoy and diplomat
- Adesanya Kwamina Hyde (1915–1993), diplomat and former airman in the Royal Air Force
- John Ernst Leigh, diplomat and former presidential candidate for the Sierra Leone People's Party
- Desmond Fashole Luke (1935–2021), diplomat, former Chief Justice of the Supreme Court and one-time Minister of Health
- Abiodun Williams (born 1961), academic, diplomat and former president of The Hague Institute for Global Justice

== Entrepreneurs and businesspersons ==
- Richard Beale Blaize (1845–1904), Sierra Leonean-Nigerian businessman, newspaper publisher, financier, and black nationalist
- James Pinson Davies (1828–1906), merchant, former British Naval officer and later agronomist known as the pioneer of cocoa farming in West Africa
- John Ezzidio (1810–1872), businessman, politician and pre-municipality era mayor of Freetown
- Thomas Frederick Hope (1919–1996), first engineer-in-chief, Guma Valley Water Company and first chairman, Ecobank Transnational Incorporated
- Maximiliano Jones (1871–1944), farmer and millionaire
- Henry Olufemi Macauley (born 1962), businessman with expertise in the oil industries and former Minister of Energy
- Sir Ernest Dunstan Morgan (1896–1979), pharmaceutical entrepreneur and philanthropist
- Samuel Herbert Pearse, wealthy Nigerian businessman and legislator of Sierra Leone Creole decent
- John 'Johnny' Taylor (died 1898), Sierra Leone Creole merchant during 1898 Hut Tax War
- John Malamah Thomas (1844–1922), entrepreneur and mayor of Freetown from 1904 to 1912
- Samuel Benjamin Thomas (1833–1901), philanthropist, entrepreneur and one of the richest men in 19th-century Africa
- William Vivour (1830–1890), single most successful 19th-century planter in Africa
- Frederica Williams (born 1958), president and chief executive officer at Whittier Street Health Center

== Human-rights activists ==
- Herbert Christian Bankole-Bright (1883–1958), political activist, medical doctor and founder of the National Council of Sierra Leone
- James Desmond Buckle (1910–1964), trade unionist and political activist
- Adelaide Casely-Hayford (1868–1960), activist of cultural nationalism, writer, feminist and pioneer of women's education in Sierra Leone
- FannyAnn Eddy (1974–2004), activist for LGBT rights
- Edna Elliott-Horton (1904–1994), political activist and first West African woman to complete a BA degree in the liberal arts
- Herbert Olayinka Macauley (1864–1946), political activist and founder of Nigerian nationalism
- Lamina Sankoh (born: Etheldred Jones) (1884–1964), political activist, educator, banker and cleric who founded the "Peoples Party" which eventually became the Sierra Leone People's Party (SLPP)
- Nancy Victoria Steele (1923–2001), labour activist, founder and leader of the National Congress of Sierra Leone Women
- Isaac Wallace-Johnson (1894–1965), political activist and trade unionist during the colonial era

== Judges and barristers ==
- Sir Samuel Bankole-Jones (1911–1981), former Chief Justice and first Sierra Leonean president of the Court of Appeal
- Sir Salako Benka-Coker (1900–1965), first Sierra Leonean Chief Justice of the Supreme Court
- Nicholas Colin Browne-Marke (born 1957), judge in the Supreme Court of Sierra Leone and The Gambia
- Christian Frederick Cole (1852–1885), first black graduate of Oxford and first African barrister to practice in the English courts
- Gershon Beresford Collier (1927–1994), former Chief Justice of Sierra Leone, educator and diplomat
- Dame Linda Penelope Dobbs (born 1951), first non-white person to be appointed to the senior judiciary of England and Wales
- Patrick Omolade Hamilton, Supreme Court judge of Sierra Leone
- James Ayodele Jenkins-Johnston (1946–2017), barrister and human rights defender
- George Gelaga King (1932–2016), judge presiding at the Special Court for Sierra Leone
- Jamesina Leonora King, jurist and first Sierra Leonean Commissioner of the African Commission on Human and Peoples Rights
- Augustus Merriman-Labor (1877–1919), barrister, writer and munitions worker
- John Clavell Smythe (1915–1996), former Royal Air Force navigation officer, barrister and attorney-general of Sierra Leone
- Ade Renner Thomas (born 1945), barrister and one-time Chief Justice of Sierra Leone
- Stella Thomas (1906–1974), Nigerian of Sierra Leone Creole descent who was the first West African female to qualify as a lawyer
- John Bankole Thompson (1936–2021), jurist, judge and academic
- Frances Claudia Wright (1919–2010), first Sierra Leonean woman to be called to the Bar in Great Britain and to practice law in Sierra Leone

== Knights and Dames Commander ==
- Sir Kitoye Ajasa (born: Edmund Macauley) (1866–1937), legislator during the colonial period and first Nigerian to receive a knighthood
- Sir Samuel Bankole-Jones (1911–1981), former Chief Justice and first Sierra Leonean president of the Court of Appeal
- Sir Salako Benka-Coker (1900–1965), first Sierra Leonean Chief Justice of the Supreme Court
- Sir Ernest Beoku-Betts (1895–1957), jurist and one-time mayor of Freetown
- Sir Henry Lightfoot Boston (1898–1969), first African Governor-General of Sierra Leone
- Dame Linda Penelope Dobbs (born 1951), first non-white person to be appointed to the senior judiciary of England and Wales
- Sir Samuel Lewis (1843–1903), first mayor of Freetown and first West African to receive a knighthood
- Sir Emile Fashole-Luke (1895–1980), former Chief Justice and Speaker of Parliament
- Sir Ernest Dunstan Morgan (1896–1979), pharmaceutical entrepreneur and philanthropist

== Mayors of Freetown ==
- Yvonne Aki-Sawyerr, (born 1969), finance professional and current mayor of Freetown
- Samuel Sigismund Barlatt, prominent lawyer and one-time mayor of Freetown
- Sir Ernest Beoku-Betts (1895–1957), jurist and one-time mayor of Freetown
- Dr Claude Nelson-Williams, Chairman of the Management Committee of the Freetown City Council
- William John Campbell, former mayor of Freetown
- Emmanuel Cummings, former mayor of Freetown
- Eustace Taylor Cummings (1890–1967), medical doctor and mayor of Freetown from 1948 to 1954
- Constance Cummings-John (1918–2000), educator, politician and first female mayor of Freetown
- Florence Agnes Dillsworth (1937–2000), one-time mayor of Freetown and former principal of St. Joseph's Convent School
- John Ezzidio (1810–1872), businessman, politician and pre-municipality era mayor of Freetown
- Sam Franklyn Gibson (born 1951), teacher and one-time mayor of Freetown
- Herbert George-Williams, former mayor of Freetown
- June Holst-Roness (1929–2008), medical doctor and former mayor of Freetown
- Winstanley Bankole Johnson, one-time mayor of Freetown
- Sir Samuel Lewis (1843–1903), first mayor of Freetown and first West African to receive a knighthood
- John Malamah Thomas (1844–1922), entrepreneur and mayor of Freetown from 1904 to 1912
- Thomas Josiah Thompson (1867–1941), lawyer, one-time mayor of Freetown and founder of the Sierra Leone Daily Mail

== Musicians ==
- Patrice Bart-Williams (born 1979), singer-songwriter, music producer and filmmaker
- Ebenezer Calendar (1912–1985), musician who created and popularized Creole gumbe music and maringa music
- Asadata Dafora (1890–1965), multidisciplinary musician
- Evelyn Mary Dove (1902–1987), singer and actress
- Devonté Hynes (born 1985), singer-songwriter and record producer
- Bunny Mack (1945–2015), singer-songwriter and performer
- N'fa (born 1979), hip hop recording artist
- Dr. Oloh (1944–2007), afropop and jazz musician
- Daddy Saj (born 1978), rapper who blends hip hop and traditional Creole gumbe music

== Physicians and surgeons ==
- John Augustus Abayomi-Cole (1848–1943), medical doctor and herbalist
- Crispin Adeniyi-Jones (1876–1957), psychiatrist and first director of the Yaba Asylum in Nigeria
- Herbert Christian Bankole-Bright (1883–1958), political activist, medical doctor and founder of the National Council of Sierra Leone party
- Edward Mayfield Boyle (1874–1936), medical practitioner and one of the first West Africans to attend Howard University College of Medicine
- Robert Wellesley Cole (1907–1995), general surgeon and first West African to become a Fellow of the Royal College of Surgeons
- William Broughton Davies (1831–1906), first West African to qualify as a medical doctor
- Charles Odamtten Easmon (1913–1994), performed the first successful Open-Heart Surgery in West Africa
- John Farrell Easmon (1856–1900), medical doctor who coined the term Blackwater fever and wrote the first clinical diagnosis of the disease linking it to malaria
- Macormack Farrell Easmon (1890–1972), medical doctor and founder of the Sierra Leone National Museum
- Claude Nelson-Williams (1927–1989), physician, politician, and civil leader
- George Bernard Frazer (1933–2018), medical practitioner and gynaecologist
- George Adeniji Garrick (1917–1988), medical doctor and high jump record holder
- June Holst-Roness (1929–2008), medical doctor and former mayor of Freetown
- James Africanus Horton (1835–1883), surgeon, scientist and political thinker who worked towards African independence a century before it occurred
- Irene Ighodaro (née: Wellesley-Cole) (1916–1995), first Sierra Leonean woman to qualify as a medical doctor
- Ulric Emmanuel Jones (1940–2020), first Sierra Leonean neurosurgeon
- Nathaniel Thomas King (1847–1884), one of the earliest western-trained West African doctors to practise medicine in Nigeria
- Olayinka Koso-Thomas (born 1937), medical doctor known internationally for her efforts to abolish female genital mutilation
- Abioseh Davidson Nicol (1925–1994), physician and biomedical researcher who discovered the breakdown of insulin in the human body, a breakthrough for the treatment of diabetes
- Lenrie Wilfred Peters (1932–2009), surgeon, poet and educator
- Arthur Thomas Porter IV (1956–2015), physician and hospital administrator.
- William Robert Priddy (1926–2003), medical practitioner and Fellow of the Royal College of Obstetricians and Gynaecologists
- William Renner (1846–1917), oncologist and Assistant Surgeon-General during the colonial era
- Agnes Yewande Savage (1906–1964), Nigerian of Sierra Leone Creole descent who was the first West African woman to qualify as a medical doctor
- Richard Akinwande Savage (1903–1993), medical doctor and first West African to serve as a British Army officer
- Arthur Farquhar Stuart (1927–2002), consultant physician at Connaught Hospital

== Pioneer ancestors ==
- Daniel Coker (1780–1847), emigrated from Baltimore, Maryland and was missionary and founder of the West African Methodist Church
- David George (c. 1742–1810), emigrated from Nova Scotia and was preacher of the first recorded Baptist service in Africa held under the Cotton Tree before the land was baptized and christened "Free Town"
- William Gwinn (born 1755), one of the first black Americans to participate in the antebellum American Back-to-Africa movement to Sierra Leone
- Abraham Hazeley (1784–1847), Nova Scotian settler and founder of what was to become one of the most prominent Creole families in Freetown.
- Montague James (died 1812), leader of Cudjoe's Town (Trelawny Town) maroons who settled in Freetown where he helped put down the Black Nova Scotian revolt
- Major Jarrett (died 1839), leader of the Jamaican Maroons who helped put down the Black Nova Scotian revolt
- Boston King (c. 1760–1802), soldier and Black Loyalist who helped found Freetown and became the first Methodist missionary to African indigenous people
- Cato Perkins (died 1805), former African American slave, later missionary, who migrated to Freetown, where he led a strike of carpenters against the Sierra Leone Company
- Mary Perth (1740–1813), prominent African American colonist and businesswoman in Freetown
- Thomas Peters (1738–1793), soldier with the auxiliary troops of the British Black Company of Pioneers and the revolutionary founding father of Freetown
- Elizabeth Renner (died 1826), emigrated from Nova Scotia and became the first female teacher and principal of a girls' school in the missionary in Africa
- Charles Samuels (died early 1800s), maroon officer from Cudjoe's Town (Trelawny Town), who was assistant to Colonel Montague James
- Harry Washington (c. 1740–1800), soldier and Black Loyalist in the American Revolutionary War who was among several hundred settlers who rose up in a brief rebellion against British rule in Freetown
- Moses 'Daddy' Wilkinson (born 1746), Wesleyan Methodist preacher who migrated to Sierra Leone in 1791 where he established the first Methodist church in Settler Town and survived the rebellion in 1800.

== Politicians and civil administrators ==
- Arnold Bishop-Gooding (born 1950), lawyer and former Attorney-General of Sierra Leone
- Chidi Blyden, American foreign policy advisor who serves as Deputy Assistant Secretary of Defense for African Affairs in the Biden administration.
- Sylvia Olayinka Blyden (born 1971), journalist, political commentator, newspaper editor and one-time cabinet minister
- Sir Henry Lightfoot Boston (1898–1969), Governor-General of Sierra Leone from 1962 to 1967
- Dennis Bright, university instructor and former Minister of Sports
- David Omashola Carew, economist and former Minister of Finance
- Christopher Okoro Cole (1921–1990), one-time Governor-General and Chief Justice of Sierra Leone
- Femi Claudius Cole (born 1962), politician of the Unity Party and first Sierra Leonean woman to form a political party
- Edmund Cowan (born 1937), former Speaker of Parliament and Ombudsman
- Ivor Gustavus Cummings (1913–1992), first black official in the British Colonial Office
- Stanley David Garrick (1888–1958), senior administrator and courtier
- Prince Alex Harding, former Minister of Transportation and Communication
- Victor Chukuma Johnson (1944–2012), former chairman and deputy leader of the All People's Congress
- Andrew Juxon-Smith (1931–1996), former commander of the Armed Forces and Head of State of Sierra Leone
- Charles Burgess King (1875–1961), former President of Liberia and of Sierra Leone Creole heritage
- Desmond Fashole Luke (1935–2021), diplomat, former Chief Justice of the Supreme Court and one-time Minister of Health
- George William Nicol (1810–1884), first African Colonial Secretary of Sierra Leone
- Sir Emile Fashole Luke (1895–1980), former Chief Justice and Speaker of Parliament
- Murietta Olu-Williams (born 1923), first woman in Africa to achieve the rank of Permanent Secretary in the civil service
- James Ernest Parkes (1861–1899), first Secretary for Native Affairs during the colonial era in Sierra Leone
- Solomon James Pratt (1921–2017), former Attorney General and Minister of Justice
- George Theophilus Robinson (1922–2006), civil administrator and founder of the Krio Descendants Union
- Valentine Strasser (born 1967), former army officer and Head of State of Sierra Leone
- Abel Bankole Stronge, lawyer and one-time Speaker of the Parliament of Sierra Leone
- Nanette Beatrice Thomas (born 1956), former Minister of Political and Public Affairs
- Christiana Thorpe (born 1949), former two-term Chief Electoral Commissioner and Chairperson of the National Electoral Commission

== Religious leaders ==
- William Barleycorn (1848–1925), first Primitive Methodist missionary who went to Fernando Po (now known as Bioko) in Africa in the early 1880s.
- Samuel Ajayi Crowther (c. 1809–1891), Sierra Leonean-Nigerian clergyman and first Anglican Bishop of West Africa
- Samuel Johnson (1846–1901), historian and Anglican priest
- Thomas Sylvester Johnson (1873–1955), educator, theologian and former bishop of Sierra Leone'
- George Gurney Nicol (1856–1888), clergyman and first African graduate of Cambridge University
- Moses Nathanael Scott (1911–1988), clergyman and Anglican Bishop of Sierra Leone who later became Archbishop of the Province of West Africa
- Kathleen Easmon Simango (née: Easmon) (1891–1924), missionary, artist and first West African to earn a diploma from the Royal College of Arts

== Sports figures ==
=== Footballers (association, soccer) ===
- Samuel Barlay (born 1986), midfielder with IFK Mora who has made numerous appearances for Sierra Leone's national football team – Leone Stars
- Moses Barnett (born 1990), defender in the English Football League and England under 17s
- Chris Bart-Williams (born 1974), midfielder in the Premier League and England under 21s
- Albert Cole (born 1981), midfielder for Mighty Blackpool FC and Leone Stars
- Carlton Cole (born 1983), striker in the Premier League with several appearances for England
- Curtis Eugene Davies (born 1985), defender in the English Football League Championship and England under 21s
- Albert Jarrett (born 1984), winger in the English Football League Championship with several appearances for Leone Stars
- Obi Metzger (born 1987), attacking midfielder for Finnish second division side FC Haka who has made several appearances for Leone Stars
- Nigel Reo-Coker (born 1984), midfielder in the Premier League and England under 21s
- Leroy Rosenior (born 1964), striker for England under 21s and Leone Stars
- Liam Rosenior (born 1984), full back and winger in the English Football League Championship and England under 21s
- Rodney Strasser (born 1990), defensive midfielder with Turun Palloseura FC based in Turku, Finland
- William Sorba Thomas (born 1999), winger for Huddersfield Town FC and the Wales national team
- Augustine Williams (born 1997), striker who plays in the USL Championship and has made a few appearances for Leone Stars
- Kevin Adrian Wright (born 1995), defender who plays for IK Sirius in Allsvenskan with a few appearances for Leone Stars

=== Track and field athletes ===
- William Akabi-Davis (born 1962), sprinter at the 1980 Summer Olympics
- Julia Helene Armstrong (born 1959), marathon runner
- Eunice Barber (born 1974), former athlete competing in heptathlon and long jump
- Horace Dove-Edwin (born 1967), retired sprinter who specialized in the 100-metre dash
- Walter During (born 1960), sprinter at the 1980 Summer Olympics
- George Adeniji Garrick (1917–1988), medical doctor and high jump record holder
- Rudolph George (born 1957), sprinter at the 1980 Summer Olympics
- Denton Guy-Williams (born 1972), sprinter at the 1992 Summer Olympics
- Modupe Jonah (born 1966), middle-distance runner at the 1988 Summer Olympics
- Pierre Lisk (born 1971), sprinter at the 1996 Summer Olympics
- Eugenia Osho-Williams (born 1964), former sprinter and first woman to represent Sierra Leone at the Olympics
- David Sawyerr (born 1961), sprinter at the 1984 Summer Olympics
- Josephus Thomas (born 1971), sprinter at the 1996 Summer Olympics
- Rachel Thompson (born 1964), middle-distance runner at the 1988 Summer Olympics

=== Boxers ===
- John Coker (born 1940), competed in the men's heavyweight event at the 1968 Summer Olympics.
- Israel Cole (born 1964), boxer at the 1984 Summer Olympics
- Francis "Frank" Dove (1897–1957), boxer at the 1920 Summer Olympics
- Egerton Forster (born 1959), boxer at the 1984 Summer Olympics
- Leonard Benker Johnson (1902–1974), middleweight boxing champion
- Desmond Williams (born 1967), competed in the men's light middleweight event at the 1988 Summer Olympics

=== Rugby players ===
- Danny Wilson (born 1955), former rugby union, and professional rugby league player
- Billy Boston (born 1934), former professional rugby league footballer

=== Swimmers ===
- Michael 'Joko' Collier (born 1971), swimmer at the 1996 Summer Olympics
- Joshua Wyse (born 2001), swimmer at the 2020 Summer Olympics

=== Other sports ===
- Napheesa Collier (born 1996), professional basketball player and gold medallist at the 2020 Summer Olympic Games
- Frederick Harris (born 1984), judoka at the 2020 Summer Olympics
- Frank Williams (born 1964), cyclist at the 1996 Summer Olympics
- George Wyndham (born 1990), para table tennis player who competed at the 2016 Summer Paralympics

== Visual artists ==
- Gaston Bart-Williams (1938–1990), journalist and film maker
- Alphonso Lisk-Carew (1887–1969), prominent photographer appointed for the visit of the Duke of Connaught
- Kathleen Easmon Simango (née: Easmon) (1891–1924), painter, fashion designer and graduate of the Royal College of Arts
- Alfred Ashley Taylor, ball point artist known for creating hyper-realistic drawings

== Writers and journalists ==
- Bankole Awoonor-Renner (1898–1970), first Black African to study in the Soviet Union, and first African to be accredited to the Institute of Journalists in London.
- Gaston Bart-Williams (1938–1990), journalist, novelist and film director
- Gladys Casely-Hayford (1904–1950), first author to write in the Krio language
- Raymond Ayodele Charley (1948–1993), playwright and writer
- Syl Cheney-Coker (born 1945), poet, novelist, and journalist
- James Vivian Clinton (1902–1973), expatriate and journalist
- Thomas Decker (1916–1978), writer, poet, journalist, and linguist
- Clifford Nelson Fyle (1933–2006), scholar and author known for writing the lyrics to the Sierra Leone National Anthem
- Delia Jarrett-Macauley (born 1958), writer, academic and broadcaster
- Eyamide Ella Lewis-Coker (née: Smith), writer and book author
- Valerie Mason-John (born 1962), author and public speaker
- Augustus Merriman-Labor (1877–1919), writer best known for his 1909 book Britons Through Negro Spectacles
- Nii Ayikwei Parkes (born 1974), poet, writer and sociocultural commentator
- Emmanuel Bankole Timothy (1923–1994), journalist and biographer

== See also ==
- List of African Americans
- List of Americo-Liberian people
- List of Black Britons
- List of Black Nova Scotians
- List of Gambian Creole people
- List of Jamaican Maroons
- List of Krio Fernandino people
- List of Saro people (Nigerian Creoles)
