= List of people from Freetown =

Below is a list of notable people from Freetown, Sierra Leone. Please only include entries with a Wikipedia article.

== Academics and educators ==
- Edward Wilmot Blyden III, diplomat, political scientist and educator.
- Violet Showers Johnson, academic, author and historian.
- Aaron Belisarius Cosmo Sibthorpe, nineteenth century historian.
- Victor Okrafo-Smart, author and genealogical researcher.
- Noah Arthur William Cox-George, academic and economist.
- Bertha Conton, teacher, educator, and founder of Leone Preparatory School.
- Eustace Palmer, academic, author and public orator.
- Lemuel A. Johnson, academic, poet, and author.
- Lati Hyde-Forster, first Sierra Leonean woman to graduate from Fourah Bay College.
- William Farquhar Conton, educator, historian, and author.
- Hannah Benka-Coker (born Hannah Luke), educator and founder of Freetown Secondary School for Girls.
- Abiodun Williams, academic and former president of The Hague Institute for Global Justice.
- Akintola Josephus Gustavus Wyse, academic, author and historian.
- Arthur Thomas Daniel Porter III, academic, author and historian.
- Edna Elliott-Horton, first West African woman to complete a BA degree in the liberal arts.
- Edward Fasholé-Luke, academic and theologian.
- Harry Alphonso Ebun Sawyerr, writer and Anglican theologian.
- Eldred Durosimi Jones, academic and literary critic.
- Enid Rosamund Ayodele Forde, academic, earth scientist, geographer and first Sierra Leonean woman to earn a PhD.
- Trudy Morgan, first African woman to be awarded a Fellowship of the Institution of Civil Engineers and twice president of Sierra Leone Institution of Engineers.
- Reginald Akindele Cline-Cole, academic, earth scientist and developmental geographer.
- Thomas Frederick Hope, first Engineer-in-Chief, Guma Valley Water Company and first chairman, Ecobank Transnational Incorporated.

== Activists/writers/artists ==
- Adelaide Casely-Hayford, advocate, nationalist, and educator.
- Patricia Piccinini, Australian artist.
- FannyAnn Eddy, gay rights activist.
- Farid Raymond-Anthony, Sierra Leonean writer, author and poet.
- Syl Cheney-Coker, poet, novelist, and journalist.
- Thomas Decker, writer, poet, journalist, and linguist.
- Eyamide Ella Lewis-Coker (Eyamide Ella Smith), writer and book author.
- Gaston Bart-Williams, journalist, novelist and film director.
- Emmanuel Bankole Timothy, journalist and biographer.
- Raymond Caleb Ayodele Charley, playwright and writer.
- Yulisa Amadu Maddy (Pat Maddy), composer, journalist and writer.
- Clifford Nelson Fyle, composer of the Sierra Leone National Anthem.
- Alphonso Sylvester Lisk-Carew, prominent photographer appointed for the visit of the Duke of Connaught.
- Raouf J Jacob, filmmaker

== Actors/actresses ==
- Jeillo Edwards
- Desmond Finney
- Adetokumboh McCormack

== Criminals ==
- Issa Hassan Sesay, convicted war criminal who served in the Sierra Leonean army and the Armed Forces Revolutionary Council (AFRC).
- Brima Bazzy Kamara, rebel leader and convicted war criminal.
- Santigie Borbor Kanu, rebel leader and convicted war criminal.
- Jamil Sahid Mohamed, former businessman, convicted for involvement in assassination plot.

== Health care and social justice ==
- Frederica Williams, President and chief executive officer of Whittier Street Health Center in Boston, Massachusetts since 2002.
- Sir Ernest Dunstan Morgan (1896–1979), pharmaceutical entrepreneur and philanthropist

== Military personnel ==
- Brigadier-General Arthur Nelson-Williams, The Republic of Sierra Leone Armed Forces spokesman
- Brigadier-General Tom Carew was in the Sierra Leonean army and Chief of Defence Staff of the Republic of Sierra Leone Armed Forces from April 2000 to November 2003
- Emmanuel Cole, soldier and hero of the "Gunners Revolt"
- John Henry Clavell Smythe, former Royal Air Force navigation officer, barrister and Attorney General of Sierra Leone

== Religious leaders ==
- George Gurney Mather Nicol, clergyman and first African graduate of Cambridge University.
- Daniel Coker, missionary and founder of the West African Methodist Church.
- Thomas Sylvester Johnson, educator and former bishop of Sierra Leone.
- Samuel Ajayi Crowther, Sierra Leonean-Nigerian clergyman and first Anglican Bishop of West Africa.
- Moses Nathanael Christopher Omobiala Scott, clergyman and Anglican Bishop of Sierra Leone who later became Archbishop of the Province of West Africa.

== Musicians ==
- Ebenezer Calendar, musician who created and popularized Creole gumbe music and maringa music.
- Oloh Israel Olufemi Cole (Dr. Oloh), musician.
- Daddy Saj (Joseph Gerald Adolphus Cole), rapper.
- Bunny Mack (Cecil Bunting MacCormack), singer.
- Emmerson
- Reuben Koroma

== Judges and lawyers ==
- Sir Samuel Bankole-Jones (1911–1981), former Chief Justice and first Sierra Leonean president of the Court of Appeal
- Sir Salako Benka-Coker (1900–1965), first Sierra Leonean Chief Justice of the Supreme Court
- Dame Linda Penelope Dobbs, first non-white person appointed to the senior judiciary of England and Wales
- Nicholas Colin Browne-Marke, judge in the Supreme Court of Sierra Leone and The Gambia.
- George Gelaga King, judge presiding at the Special Court for Sierra Leone.
- Patrick Omolade Hamilton, Supreme Court judge of Sierra Leone.
- Frances Claudia Wright, first Sierra Leonean woman to be called to the Bar in Great Britain and to practice law in Sierra Leone.
- Jamesina Essie Leonora King, jurist and first Sierra Leonean sworn in as Commissioner of the African Commission on Human and Peoples Rights.
- Ade Renner Thomas, barrister and one-time Chief Justice of Sierra Leone.
- James Blyden Jenkins-Johnston, barrister and human rights defender.
- John Rosolu Bankole Thompson, jurist, judge and academic.
- Stella Thomas, Nigerian of Sierra Leonean descent who was the first West African to qualify as a lawyer.
- Gershon Beresford Onesimus Collier, former Chief Justice of Sierra Leone, educator and diplomat.
- Christian Frederick Cole, first African barrister to practice in the English courts.
- Augustus Boyle Chamberlayne Merriman‐Labor, barrister, writer and munitions worker.

== Politicians ==
- Sir Samuel Lewis, first mayor of Freetown and first West African to receive a knighthood
- Sir Emile Fashole Luke, former Chief Justice and Speaker of Parliament
- Sir Ernest Beoku-Betts, jurist and one-time mayor of Freetown
- Sir Henry Josiah Lightfoot Boston, Governor-General of Sierra Leone from 1962 to 1967
- Christopher Elnathan Okoro Cole, one-time Governor-General and Chief Justice of Sierra Leone
- Andrew Juxon-Smith, former commander of the Armed Forces and Head of State of Sierra Leone
- Valentine Strasser, Head of State of Sierra Leone from 1992 to 1996
- Herbert George-Williams, former mayor of Freetown
- Winstanley Bankole Johnson, former mayor of Freetown
- John Henry Malamah Thomas, mayor of Freetown from 1904 to 1912
- Eustace Henry Taylor Cummings, mayor of Freetown from 1948 to 1954
- Ade Renner Thomas, current Chief Justice of Sierra Leone
- Isaac Wallace-Johnson, a Sierra Leonean journalist and a politician
- Siaka Probyn Stevens, Head of State of Sierra Leone from 21 April 1971 – 28 November 1985
- Ernest Bai Koroma, current Head of State of Sierra Leone and the fourth since 2007
- Joseph Saidu Momoh, Head of State of Sierra Leone from 1985 to 1992
- Alhaji Ahmad Tejan Kabbah, third Head of State of Sierra Leone from 1996 to 1997 and again from 1998 to 2007
- Johnny Paul Koroma, former Head of State of Sierra Leone and indicted war criminal

== Physicians and surgeons ==
- Abioseh Davidson Nicol, academic, medical doctor and discoverer of the breakdown of insulin in the human body, a breakthrough for the treatment of diabetes.
- William Broughton Davies, first West African to qualify as a medical doctor.
- Irene Ighodaro (Irene Elizabeth Beatrice Wellesley-Cole), first Sierra Leonean woman to qualify as a medical doctor.
- Edward Mayfield Boyle, medical practitioner and one of the first West Africans to attend Howard University College of Medicine.
- William Robert Gorham Ebun Priddy, medical practitioner and Fellow of the Royal College of Obstetricians and Gynaecologists.
- James Africanus Beale Horton, surgeon, scientist and political thinker who worked towards African independence a century before it occurred.
- Ulric Oduma Emmanuel Jones, first Sierra Leonean neurosurgeon.
- Robert Benjamin Ageh Wellesley Cole, medical practitioner and first West African to become a Fellow of the Royal College of Surgeons.
- Olayinka Koso-Thomas, medical doctor known internationally for her efforts to abolish female genital mutilation.
- John Augustus Abayomi-Cole, medical doctor and herbalist.
- George Bernard Frazer, medical practitioner and gynaecologist.

== Sports figures ==
=== Football (soccer) ===
- Sheriff Suma
- Roda Antar
- Sarway Dollar
- Samuel Barlay
- Sidney Kargbo
- Obi Metzger
- Mustapha Sama
- Michael Tommy
- Lamine Conteh
- Muwahid Sesay
- Kewullay Conteh
- Ibrahim Kargbo
- Albert Cole
- Alimamy Sesay
- Christian Caulker
- Albert Jarrett
- Kabba Samura
- Abdul Thompson Conteh
- George Davies
- Mahmadu Alphajor Bah
- Michael Lahoud
- Mehdi Khalil
- Trevoh Chalobah
- Walid Shour
- Albert Foday

=== Other sports ===
- Eugenia Osho-Williams, former sprinter and first woman to represent Sierra Leone at the Olympics.
- Eunice Barber, former athlete competing in heptathlon and long jump.
- Horace Dove-Edwin, retired sprinter who specialized in the 100-metre dash.
- Denton Guy-Williams, sprinter at the 1992 Summer Olympics.
- Josephus Thomas, sprinter at the 1996 Summer Olympics.
- William Akabi-Davis, sprinter at the 1980 Summer Olympics.
- Modupe Jonah, middle-distance runner at the 1988 Summer Olympics.
- Rudolph George, sprinter at the 1980 Summer Olympics.
- Pierre Lisk, sprinter at the 1996 Summer Olympics.
- David Sawyerr, sprinter at the 1984 Summer Olympics.
- Rachel Thompson, middle-distance runner at the 1988 Summer Olympics.
- B. J. Tucker, American football player of the San Francisco 49ers (NFL)
- Madieu Williams, American football player of the Cincinnati Bengals
- Hawanatu Bangura, Sierra Leonean sprinter
- Israel Cole, boxer at the 1984 Summer Olympics.
- Joshua Wyse, swimmer at the 2020 Summer Olympics.
- Frank Williams, cyclist at the 1996 Summer Olympics.
- Egerton Forster, boxer at the 1984 Summer Olympics.
- Michael 'Joko' Collier, swimmer at the 1996 Summer Olympics.
