= Timeline of Freetown =

The following is a timeline of the history of the city of Freetown, Sierra Leone.

== Prior to 19th century ==
- 1540-50s - native Bullom people conquered by the Mane
- January 1568 - English slave raider John Hawkins helps destroy Bonga, a town of around 10 000 people located in the area that would become Freetown.
- 1787
  - 9 May: Settlers arrive from Portsmouth, England.
  - Granville Town, Province of Freedom established by the London-based Committee for the Relief of the Black Poor.
- 1789 - Granville Town burned down.
- 1792 - Freetown established by black American ex-slaves (called the Nova Scotian Settlers) under the auspices of the Sierra Leone Company.
- 1794 - September: Settler Town attacked by French.
- 1800
  - September: Rebellion of Nova Scotian Settlers.
  - Jamaican Maroon settlers arrive.

== 19th century ==
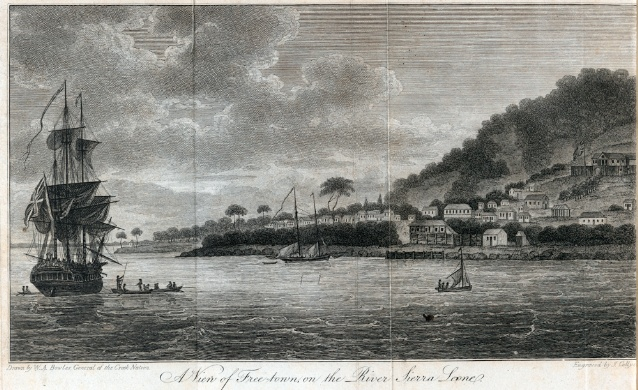
Freetown, 1803

- 1805 - Martello Tower built.
- 1808
  - Freetown settlement becomes a British crown colony.
  - "Slavers court" established.
- 1811 - Population: 1,900.
- 1812 - Wilberforce suburb founded for Liberated Africans."
- 1816 - Krootown established.
- 1822
  - Rawdon Street Methodist Church built.
  - Population: 4,785.
- 1827 - Fourah Bay College established.
- 1828 - St. George's Cathedral, Freetown built.
- 1830s - Foulah Town Mosque built.
- 1845
  - Church Mission Society Grammar School founded.
  - John Ezzidio becomes mayor.
- 1846 - Cline Town established.
- 1847 - Female Institution (school) founded.
- 1853 - Inhabitants become "British subjects."
- 1865 - Samuel Lewis becomes mayor.
- 1866 - St. Edward's Primary School founded.
- 1867 - Government Wharf built.
- 1872 - Pope Hennessy Day festival begins.
- 1873 - Independent newspaper begins publication.
- 1874 - Wesleyan High School for Boys opens.
- 1875 - West African Reporter newspaper begins publication.
- 1884
  - Sierra Leone Weekly News begins publication.
  - Leopold Educational Institute opens.
  - Fire.
- 1891 - Population: 30,033.
- 1893 - Town attains city status; Freetown City Council established.
- 1895 - Governor's residence built.
- 1898 - Bank of British West Africa branch and ice factory established.
- 1899 - Songo Town-Freetown railway begins operating.

== 20th century ==
- 1901 - Population: 34,463.
- 1904
  - John Henry Malamah Thomas becomes mayor.
  - Albert Academy founded.
- 1905
  - Madrasa Islamia active.
  - Lisk-Carew photo studio in business.
- 1918 - Population: 34,000 (approximate).
- 1919 - July: Strike and anti-Syrian riot.
- 1922 - St. Edward's Secondary School founded.
- 1923 - Girls' Industrial and Technical Training School established.
- 1925 - Prince of Wales School founded.
- 1926
  - January: Railway strike.
  - December: City Council dissolved; Municipal Board established.
- 1928 - East End Lions Football Club formed.
- 1930 - Women granted right to vote.
- 1932
  - Muslim Congress created.
  - Sierra Leone Daily Mail newspaper begins publication.
- 1938
  - West African Youth League and League of Coloured Peoples branch headquartered in Freetown.
  - Freetown Secondary School for Girls established.
- 1948
  - Eustace Henry Taylor Cummings becomes mayor.
  - Population: 64,576.
- 1953 - Deep Water Quay construction begins.
- 1961 - City becomes capital of independent Sierra Leone.
- 1962 - Siaka Stevens becomes mayor.
- 1963 - Population: 127,917.
- 1964 - Bank of Sierra Leone headquartered in city.
- 1965 - Sierra Leone Port Authority established.
- 1966 - Constance Cummings-John becomes mayor.
- 1971 - City becomes capital of the Republic of Sierra Leone.
- 1974 - Population: 214,443.
- 1977 - Ode-lay Society (social club) formed.
- 1980 - Siaka Stevens Stadium opens.
- 1983 - For Di People newspaper begins publication.
- 1985 - Population: 469,776.

=== 1990s ===
- 1990 - Population: 529,000 (urban agglomeration).
- 1995 - Population: 603,000 (urban agglomeration).
- 1996 - Freetown/New Haven Sister Cities established.
- 1997
  - 25 March: "Rebels move into Freetown;" prisoners freed from the Pademba Road prison.
  - 30 May: Foreigners evacuated.
  - 2 June: AFRC conflict.
- 1998
  - February: "Ecomog storms Freetown and drives rebels out."
  - Kabbah returns to Freetown.
- 1999
  - January: City besieged by Armed Forces Revolutionary Council/Revolutionary United Front.
  - November: United Nations troops arrive.
- 2000
  - 2 May: City Hotel burns down.
  - 8 May: Peace demonstration.
  - Center for Media, Technology and Education established.
  - Population: 688,000 (urban agglomeration).

== 21st century ==
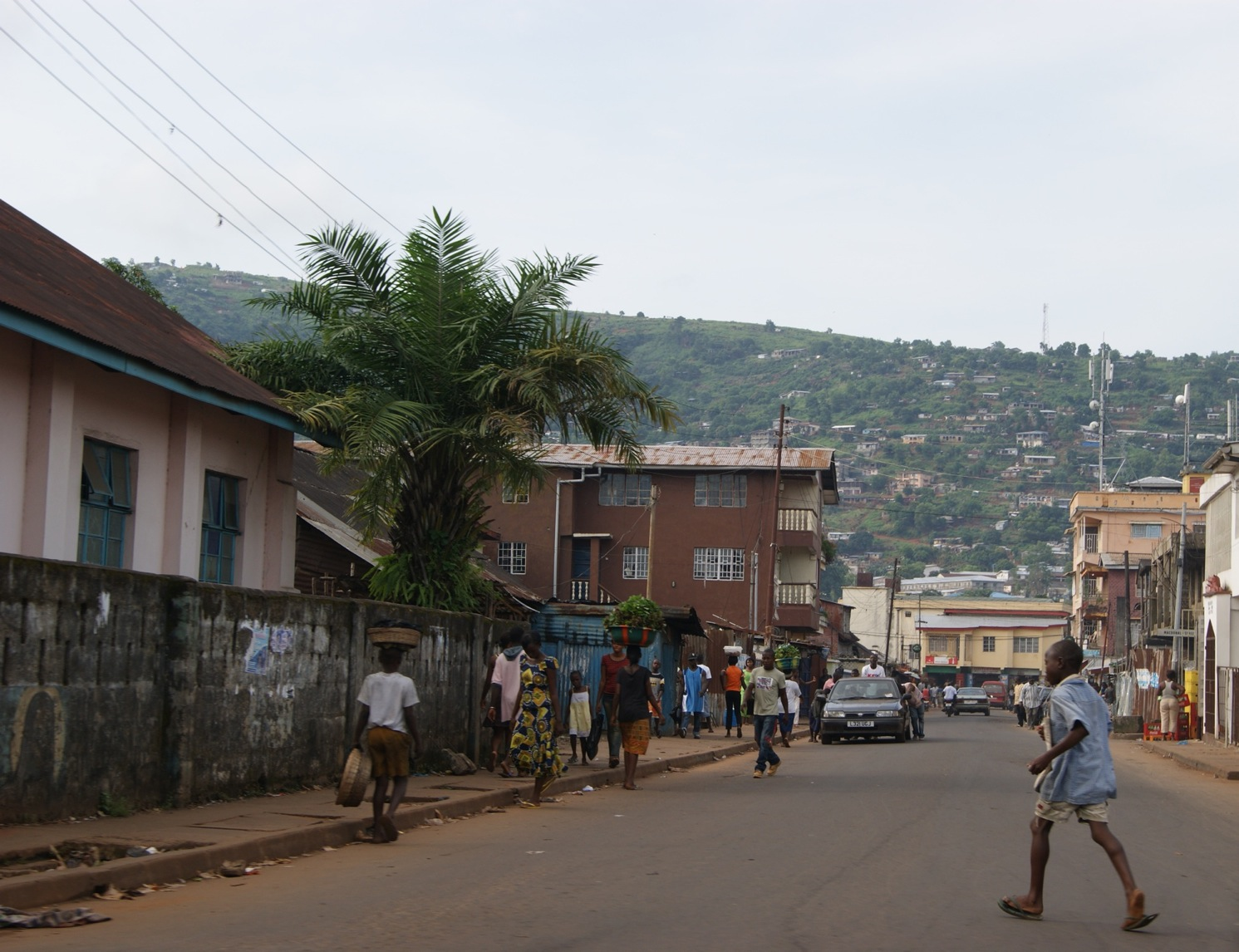
Freetown, 2009

- 2002
  - Sierra Leone Civil War ends.
  - Special Court for Sierra Leone and Kallon Football Club established.
- 2003 - 14 April: Truth and Reconciliation Commission (Sierra Leone) convenes.
- 2004
  - Winstanley Bankole Johnson becomes mayor.
  - Population: 772,873.
- 2005 - Njala University College established.
- 2010 - Population: 945,423.
- 2012
  - Cholera epidemic.
  - Sam Franklyn Gibson becomes mayor.
- 2015 - Population: 1,055,964.

== See also ==
- Freetown history
- Schools in Freetown
- List of mayors of Freetown
- History of Sierra Leone

== Bibliography ==
Published in 19th century

- Jedidiah Morse; Richard C. Morse (1823), "Freetown", A New Universal Gazetteer (4th ed.), New Haven: S. Converse
- Josiah Conder (1830), "Freetown", The Modern Traveller, London: J.Duncan
- "Sierra Leone". Street's Indian and Colonial Mercantile Directory for 1870. London: G.Street. 1870.

Published in 20th century

- "Freetown" . Encyclopædia Britannica. Vol. 11 (11th ed.). 1910. p. 88.
- H. R. Jarrett. The Port and Town of Freetown, Geography, Vol. 40, 1955, pp. 108–118.
- Michael Banton (1956). "Adaptation and Integration in the Social System of Temne Immigrants in Freetown". Africa: Journal of the International African Institute. 26 (4): 354–368. doi:10.2307/1156673. JSTOR 1156673. S2CID 145281909.
- H. Reginald Jarrett (1956). "Some Aspects of the Urban Geography of Freetown, Sierra Leone". Geographical Review. 46 (3): 334–354. Bibcode:1956GeoRv..46..334J. doi:10.2307/211884. JSTOR 211884.
- Michael Banton. West African City: A Study of Tribal Life in Freetown. London: Oxford University, 1957.
- L. Proudfoot (1959). "Mosque-Building and Tribal Separatism in Freetown East". Africa: Journal of the International African Institute. 29 (4): 405–416. doi:10.2307/1157929. JSTOR 1157929. S2CID 145211721.
- L. Proudfoot (1961). "Towards Muslim Solidarity in Freetown". Africa: Journal of the International African Institute. 31 (2): 147–157. doi:10.2307/1158102. JSTOR 1158102. S2CID 143677786.
- Christopher Fyfe; E. Jones, eds. (1968). Freetown, A Symposium. Freetown.
- Milton Harvey (1968). "Implications of migration to Freetown: A study of the relationship between migrants, housing and occupation". Civilisations. 18.
- John Nunley (1982). "Images and Printed Words in Freetown Masquerades". African Arts. 15.
- David Fashole Luke (1985). "Dock Workers of the Port of Freetown: A Case Study of African Working-Class Ambivalence". Canadian Journal of African Studies. 19 (3): 547–567. doi:10.2307/484515. JSTOR 484515.
- LaRay Denzer (1987). "Women in Freetown Politics, 1914-61: A Preliminary Study". Africa: Journal of the International African Institute. 57.
- Akintola J. G. Wyse (1987). "Dissolution of Freetown City Council in 1926: A Negative Example of Political Apprenticeship in Colonial Sierra Leone". Africa: Journal of the International African Institute. 57 (4): 422–438. doi:10.2307/1159892. ISBN 978-0-7190-2791-8. JSTOR 1159892. S2CID 144482758.
- Ibrahim Abdullah (1994). "Rethinking the Freetown Crowd: The Moral Economy of the 1919 Strikes and Riot in Sierra Leone". Canadian Journal of African Studies. 28.
- Noelle Watson, ed. (1996). "Freetown". International Dictionary of Historic Places: Middle East and Africa. UK: Routledge. ISBN 1-884964-03-6.
- M.B. Gleave. "Port activities and the spatial structure of cities: the case of Freetown, Sierra Leone." Journal of Transport Geography 5.4 (1997): 257–275.
- Odile Goerg (1998). "From Hill Station (Freetown) to Downtown Conakry (First Ward): Comparing French and British Approaches to Segregation in Colonial Cities at the Beginning of the Twentieth Century". Canadian Journal of African Studies. 32.
- P.E.H. Hair (1998). "Aspects of the Prehistory of Freetown and Creoledom". History in Africa. 25: 111–118. doi:10.2307/3172183. JSTOR 3172183. S2CID 161062468.
- Alusine Jalloh (1998). "The Fula and the Motor Transport Business in Freetown, Sierra Leone". African Economic History. 26.

Published in 21st century

- Okwui Enwezor, ed. (2002). Under Siege: Four African Cities, Freetown, Johannesburg, Kinshasa, Lagos. Ostfildern, Germany: Hatje Cantz. ISBN 978-3-7757-9090-1. "Documenta11" + website
- Diane Frost (2002). "Diasporan West African Communities: The Kru in Freetown & Liverpool". Review of African Political Economy. 29.
- Odile Goerg (2002). "Between Everyday Life and Exception: Celebrating Pope Hennessy Day in Freetown, 1872-c.1905". Journal of African Cultural Studies. 15 (1): 119–131. doi:10.1080/13696810220146182. JSTOR 3181409. S2CID 153892939.
- Allen M. Howard (2003). "Contesting Commercial Space in Freetown, 1860-1930: Traders, Merchants, and Officials". Canadian Journal of African Studies. 37.
- Paul Tiyambe Zeleza; Dickson Eyoh, eds. (2003). "Freetown, Sierra Leone". Encyclopedia of Twentieth-Century African History. Routledge. ISBN 0-415-23479-4.
- Kwame Anthony Appiah and Henry Louis Gates, ed. (2005). "Freetown". Africana: The Encyclopedia of the African and African American Experience (2nd ed.). Oxford University Press. p. 719. ISBN 978-0-19-517055-9.
- Kevin Shillington, ed. (2005). "Freetown". Encyclopedia of African History. Fitzroy Dearborn. ISBN 978-1-57958-245-6.
- Danny Hoffman (2007). "City as Barracks: Freetown, Monrovia, and the Organization of Violence in Postcolonial African Cities". Cultural Anthropology. 22 (3): 400–428. doi:10.1525/can.2007.22.3.400. JSTOR 4497779.
- Gibril R. Cole (2008). "Religious plurality and economic sustainability: Muslim merchants in the colonial economy of 19th century Freetown". African Economic History. 36.
- Kenneth Lynch et al. "Meeting the urban challenge? Urban agriculture and food security in post-conflict Freetown, Sierra Leone." Applied Geography (2012).
- Roy Maconachie, Tony Binns, and Paul Tengbe. "Urban farming associations, youth and food security in post-war Freetown, Sierra Leone." Cities 29.3 (2012): 192–200.
- Political Economy of the Urban Water-Pricing Regime in Freetown, Sierra Leone, London: Overseas Development Institute, 2012 – via International Relations and Security Network
