= Cassandra Garber =

Cassandra Garber is a notable Creole and is the current president of the Krio Descendants Union, which was founded by George T.O. Robinson. She was a former teacher and headmistress at the Freetown Secondary School for Girls in Freetown, Sierra Leone.

== Background ==
Cassandra Garber is a member of the Labor family that produced, Joshua William Labor, of Pyne Street, (1851-1918), John Michael Labor of Circular Road,(d. 1891), J.S. Labor, and Augustus Boyle Chamberlayne Merriman-Labor, a barrister, (1870-1919). She married Manilius O. Garber, a notable Sierra Leonean human rights lawyer.

== Activities ==
Currently the organization she runs has donated money to the victims of Hurricane Katrina and has also established links between the descendants of Jamaicans and African Americans (the Sierra Leone Creole people) and the present day Black Americans, Nova Scotians and Jamaicans. The KDU is also linked with the Krio Heritage Society in New York and Ronald Lisk-Carew's organizations in the United Kingdom. On June 21, 2007, Cassandra Garber sent a press release to former President Tejan Kabbah commemorating the 220th anniversary of the establishment of Freetown and also the British abolition of the slave trade. Mrs. Garber also witnessed the launch of the Krio union 'Kotoku' alongside the current mayor of Freetown, Winstanley Bankole Johnson.
