= Mayor of Freetown =

There have been a number of mayors of Freetown, Sierra Leone. Until the municipality of Freetown was established in 1895, the post of mayor was effectively in the gift of the colonial Governor, so some mayors have been appointees rather than elected representatives of Freetown, Sierra Leone.

== List of mayors of Freetown ==
=== Pre-Municipality era ===
- John Ezzidio - Nigerian-born mayor from 1845.

=== Municipality Era ===
- Sir Samuel Lewis – Mayor from 1897.
- William John Campbell – Nigerian-born Mayor during the 20th century.
- Emmanuel Cummings – Mayor during the 20th century.
- John Henry Malamah Thomas - Mayor from 1904 to 1912.
- Claudius Ernest Wright, former Mayor.
- Eustace Henry Taylor Cummings – Mayor from 1948 to 1954.
- Dr Claude Nelson-Williams - first Sierra Leonean Chairman of the Management Committee of the Freetown City Council, 1964.
- Siaka Probyn Stevens – Mayor from 1964 to 1968 later President of Sierra Leone.
- Constance Cummings-John – first female Mayor, held office in 1966 only
- Alfred Abraham Akibo-Betts, Mayor of Freetown, 1986–1993.
- June Holst-Roness, Mayor of the Freetown, 1977–1980.
- Winstanley Bankole Johnson, Mayor of Freetown from July 2004–2008.
- Herbert George-Williams, Mayor of Freetown, 2008–2012.
- Sam Franklyn Gibson, Mayor of Freetown city council, 2012–2018.
- Yvonne Aki-Sawyerr, current Mayor since March 2018
