= Ernest Morgan =

Ernest Morgan may refer to:

- Ernest Morgan (architect) (1881–1954), Welsh architect and painter
- Sir Ernest Dunstan Morgan (1896–1979), Sierra Leonean entrepreneur and philanthropist
- Ernie Morgan (1927–2013), English football player and manager

== See also ==
- Arthur Ernest Morgan (1878–1975), civil engineer, U.S. administrator, and educator
