= KDY =

KDY could refer to:

- Kildorrery, Ireland
- Kirkcaldy railway station, Scotland
- Kongelig Dansk Yachtklub, a Danish yacht club
- Krio Descendants Union, an American non-profit
- Kuat Drive Yards, a fictional manufacturer of Star Destroyers in Star Wars
