= List of Jamaican Maroons =

This is a list of notable individuals of Jamaican Maroon ancestry.

== A ==
- Yvonne Aki-Sawyerr, current mayor of Freetown

== C ==
- Adelaide Casely-Hayford, activist, nationalist and fiction writer
- Gladys Casely-Hayford, first author to write in the Krio language

== D ==
- Doris Darlington, one of Jamaica's first sound system operators, and a force in the development of ska, rocksteady and reggae music

== E ==
- Macormack Charles Farrell Easmon, medical doctor

== H ==
- Thomas Frederick Hope, engineer and entrepreneur

== J ==
- Colin Jackson, former sprint and hurdling athlete who specialised in the 110 metres hurdles
- Albert Jarrett, footballer who last played for Dulwich Hamlet and has represented the Sierra Leone national football team
- Constance Agatha Cummings-John, first woman to serve as mayor of Freetown
- Eldred Durosimi Jones, academic and literary critic

== M ==
- Timothy E. McPherson Jr., Jamaican economist

== P ==
- Suzanne Packer, actress known for playing the role of Tess Bateman in the BBC medical drama Casualty
- Arthur Thomas Porter, academic and historian

== R ==
- Namba Roy, artist, from Accompong
- Jesse Royal, musician, singer-songwriter

== S ==
- Daddy Saj, afropop musician
- Kathleen Mary Easmon Simango, artist and missionary
- Robert Smith, assistant colonial surgeon
- Francis Smith, puisne judge
