= Walter During =

Sierra Leonean sprinter

Personal information
- Nationality: Sierra Leonean
- Born: 1960 (age 65–66)

Sport
- Sport: Sprinting
- Event: 200 metres

Walter During (born 1960) is a Sierra Leonean sprinter. He competed in the men's 200 metres at the 1980 Summer Olympics.

== Career ==
During was described as Sierra Leone's top sprinter in the 1970s and early 1980s and was the youngest athlete to represent Sierra Leone internationally. He specialized in the 100 metres and 200 metres and set national records.

In 1981, he competed at the Moscow Pravda Games. The national audience followed his competitions against Kweku D'Jang.

== Personal life ==
He attended Prince of Wales School in Freetown. While at Prince of Wales, he won the Abdul Fata Hamid Award for athletics and academics. He then studied civil engineering in Prague. He became a licensed civil engineer in the United States, working in Shenandoah Valley, Virginia.
