= Dennis Bright =

Sierra Leonean politician

Dennis Bright (born in Freetown, Sierra Leone) is a former Sierra Leonean cabinet minister. He served as Sierra Leone's Minister of Youth and Sports from 2002 to 2007. Dennis Bright taught French at university and was director of the Franco-Sierra Leonean Pedagogical Centre in Freetown. He is a member of the Creole ethnic group. He was member of the Sierra Leone People's Party (SLPP) before resigning in 2017.
