= Ulric Jones =

Sierra Leonean medical doctor (1940–2020)

Ulric O.E. Jones
- Born: Ulric Oduma Emmanuel Jones; 11 December 1940; Freetown, Sierra Leone
- Died: 9 September 2020 (aged 79); Freetown, Sierra Leone
- Education: Sierra Leone Grammar School, University of Edinburgh
- Occupations: Medical Doctor, Physician, Neurosurgeon
- Spouse: Doreen Leigh
- Children: 4
- Relatives: John Ernest Leigh (brother-in-law)

Ulric Oduma Emmanuel Jones (11 December 1940 – 9 September 2020) was a Sierra Leonean medical doctor who was the first Sierra Leonean to specialize as neurosurgeon. Jones was the medical director of the Fajara Medical Clinic in the Gambia.

== Early life ==
Jones was born in Freetown, Sierra Leone on 11 December 1940 to Teddy Jones, a prominent Creole civil servant, and Hannah Jones, née Davies. The Jones family included members such as Dr Radcliffe Dougan Jones, the well-known Sierra Leonean medical doctor.

== Education and medical studies ==
Jones was educated at the Sierra Leone Grammar School where he was head-boy. Jones subsequently studied and qualified as a medical doctor at the University of Edinburgh and studied neurosurgery in Japan in the 1970s.

== Family life ==
Ulric Jones married Doreen Leigh in 1961 and the couple had four children.

== Death ==
Jones died on 9 September 2020 in Freetown, Sierra Leone.
