= June Holst-Roness =

Sierra Leonean politician

Mayor of Freetown
- In office 1977–1980

Personal details
- Born: 10 June 1929 Freetown, British Sierra Leone
- Died: 14 February 2008 (aged 77) Cambridge, United Kingdom
- Spouse: Rolv Holst-Roness
- Profession: Physician, Mayor

June Bernice Matilda Holst-Roness (June 10, 1929 – February 14, 2008) was a former Mayor of Freetown, Sierra Leone under the APC government of Siaka Stevens. June Holst-Roness was the second female Mayor of Freetown. During her term the city was twinned with Hull, England.

She was trained as a medical doctor and advanced women's health initiatives in Sierra Leone. She also served as president of the Sierra Leone Family Planning Association in 1976.

She emphasized expanding access to family planning services to address maternal and child health challenge.

== Background ==
June Holst-Roness was born to Adjuah Spaine. She studied medicine at St. Andrews University in Scotland. That was where she met her husband a Norwegian student, Rolv Holst-Roness.

Holst-Roness worked as a gynaecologist and obstetrician and was among the early Black women invited to visit China. A municipal school in Freetown, the Dr. June Holst-Roness Municipal School, was later named in her honor in recognition of her contributions as both mayor and physician.

== Political Career ==
June Holst-Roness aligned with the All People's Congress (APC), which was the dominant political party in Sierra Leone under President Siaka Stevens from 1971 to 1985.

She served as the sole female physician attending to Stevens, and this granted her access to the ruling elite networks in a post-independence context where medical expertise intersected with state priorities for national stability and development. Prior to formal political office, Holst-Roness demonstrated community leadership via her presidency of the Sierra Leone Family Planning Association, established in 1970 that focused on public health initiatives like infertility treatment. This addressed the social issues such as marital discord—efforts that resonated with APC emphases on population management and welfare in a resource-constrained nation. This non-partisan yet influential role likely motivated her entry into politics, driven by opportunities to extend health-driven service into governance amid Sierra Leone's evolving one-party framework.

== Sources ==
- http://news.sl/drwebsite/publish/article_20057723.shtml
- http://cocorioko.net/app/index.php?option=com_content&task=view&id=435&Itemid=1
- http://www.peepsierraleone.com/news/templates/article.asp?articleid=158&zoneid=7
- http://www.fssgukbranch.com/portfolio/mayor-june-holst-roness/
