= Albert Foday =

Sierra Leonean footballer

Personal information
- Full name: Albert Foday
- Date of birth: April 27, 1985 (age 41)
- Place of birth: Freetown, Sierra Leone
- Height: 5 ft 11 in (1.80 m)
- Position: Attacking midfielder

Team information
- Current team: Kallon F.C.

Senior career*
Years	Team	Apps	(Gls)
2000–2002	Mighty Blackpool		
2002–2003	Kallon F.C.		
2003–2005	Mighty Barolle		
2005–	Kallon F.C.		

International career
2004–	Sierra Leone		
- * Club domestic league appearances and goals

Albert Foday (born April 27, 1985) nickname Junnior Biano is a Sierra Leonean international footballer who is an attacking midfielder and is currently playing for FC Kallon, one of the top clubs in the Sierra Leone National Premier League.

He is known in Sierra Leone for being a free kick expert. In a 2007 CAF Champions League qualifier he scored a free kick against top Nigerian club Ocean Boys F.C., thereby knocking the Nigerian Champions out of the competition. He also went on to score again this time against ASEC Mimosas with another free kick opening the scoring in Abidjan but FC Kallon went on to lose the match 2–1 and 3–1 on aggregate.
