= Desmond Finney =

Sierra Leonean actor

- Education: University of Sierra Leone
- Occupation: Actor

Desmond Finney is a Sierra Leonean actor.

== Early life and education ==
Finney attended Leone Preparatory School, Prince of Wales schools. He did his 6th Form at the Immaculate Saint Edwards Secondary School in Kingtom, from where he proceeded to the University of Sierra Leone's Fourah Bay College to study drama. Finney furthered his education in theatre education in England.

== Career ==
Finney has appeared in over 40 African movies and was nominated Best Newcomer for the ZAFAA African Movie Awards in the United Kingdom, Best Supporting Actor by the GIAMA awards in Houston, Texas and won Best Actor AWOL (All Works of Life) Sierra Leone. He was also nominated as best actor for the 'Ansev Movie Awards' in Sierra Leone and his movie Diamond Wahala has won two awards as best comedy at the Sierra Leone International Film Festival and the Ansev Movie Awards. He is an English Drama and Theatre lecturer at the University of Sierra Leone. Finney was awarded a lifetime achievement award by the Special movie awards in the Gambia, an award that also recognized him as best foreign actor in 2016.
