= Raouf J Jacob =

Sierra Leonean filmmaker

Raouf J. Jacob
- Born: Raouf John Jacob; Freetown, Sierra Leone
- Occupations: Director, documentarian, film curator, human rights activist
- Years active: 2004–present
- Height: 5 ft 11 in (180 cm)

Raouf J. Jacob (born 1988 in Sierra Leone, West Africa), is a filmmaker, producer and film curator. Jacob is best known for his multiple award-winning documentary feature film Sierra Leone: A Culture of Silence. He is also the Executive Director & Creator and Founder of Worldwide Cinema Frames studios/films LLC and Global Cinema Film Festival of Boston (GCFF) which he founded in 2006.

== Personal life ==
He was born in Freetown, Sierra Leone. At the climax of the civil war in 1999 in Sierra Leone, he left the country. Then he immigrated to Boston, MA with his family in January 2000.

== Career ==
In 2005, he made the film Cry, America, which explored the tragic disaster and wake of Hurricane Katrina as well as the American war against Iraq. He also created the series In a Blind World. The series explored Nazi Dictator Adolf Hitler's 'Final Solution of the Jewish Problem', the 1994 Rwandan Genocide, the Darfur genocide in Sudan, the persecution of the Baha'i community in Iran and the reign of former warlord Pablo Escobar in Colombia.

In 2014, Jacob released the documentary film Sierra Leone: A Culture of Silence. He was the director, writer, producer, cinematographer, editor and sound mixer of the film. The film won many accolades, including Best Documentary Feature Film at the 2014 New York City International Film Festival, 2014 Boston International Film Festival, and the 2014 Roxbury International Film Festival. The film also screened at the 2014 Cannes Film Market (Marché du film de Cannes), the Silicon Valley African Film Festival and more!

== Filmography ==
| Year | Film | Role | Genre | Ref. |
|---|---|---|---|---|
| 2005 | Cry, America | Director, writer | Documentary | |
| 2010 | In a Blind World | Director, writer, producer | Documentary | |
| 2014 | A Culture of Silence | Director, writer, producer, cinematographer, editor, sound mixer | Documentary | |
