= List of newspapers in Sierra Leone =

This is a list of newspapers in Sierra Leone.

Dozens of newspapers are published in Sierra Leone with 15 daily newspapers operational. Most of the newspapers are privately run and are mostly distributed around the capital of Freetown due to the low levels of literacy within the small western African nation.

Sierra Leone had the first newspaper in West Africa: the Royal Gazette and Sierra Leone Advertiser (a.k.a. the Sierra Leone Gazette) in the early 19th century.

- Awoko
- allAfrica - Sierra Leone
- All People's Communication (partisan)
- Awareness Times
- The Calabash Newspaper
- Care Times
- Cocorioko
- Concord Times
- Day Break
- For Di People
- Freetown Daily
- Gleaner
- Global Times
- Heritage
- Hope Times
- Independent Observer
- Muslim Journal
- New Age
- New Citizen
- Night Watch
- Public Review
- Salone Compass
- Salone Times
- Sierra Leone Daily Mail (partisan)
- Sierra Leone Telegraph
- Standard Times
- The Bo Times
- The Covenant
- The Focus Independent
- The Future
- The Guardian
- The Indigenes
- The Orator
- The Owl
- The Reformer
- The Source
- The Town Crier
- The Trumpet
- The Vindicator
- The Watch
- Voice of Salone
- Sierra Leone Today

== New Sierra Leone News Sites ==
- Sierra Leone Today - Local Sierra Leone News - website
