= George Bernard Frazer =

Sierra Leonean physician

- Born: George Bernard Frazer; 28 December 1933; Freetown, Sierra Leone
- Died: 20 January 2018 (aged 84); Freetown, Sierra Leone
- Education: University of Aberdeen
- Occupations: Medical Doctor, Gynaecologist

George Bernard Frazer, OR, JP, FRCOG, FWACS (28 December 1933 – 20 January 2018), commonly known as Bernard Frazer was a Sierra Leonean medical doctor.

Frazer was a gynaecologist based in Freetown, Sierra Leone.

== Early life ==
George Bernard Frazer was born on 28 December 1933 in Freetown, Sierra Leone to Theophilus Frazer of Murray Town, Sierra Leone and Martha Frazer, née Peters. His Sierra Leonean parents were of Creole provenance.

== Education ==
Frazer attended the Prince of Wales Secondary School in Freetown, Sierra Leone. He was senior prefect and headboy of the Prince of Wales in 1954.

He was subsequently educated at the University of Aberdeen and qualified as a medical doctor in 1963.

== Career ==
Dr Bernard Frazer returned to Sierra Leone and established a gynaecology practice at Wellington Street, Freetown.

Frazer also practiced medicine in Britain, Jamaica, and the Grand Cayman Islands.

He received the Order of the Rokel for his contributions to medicine.

== Death ==
George Bernard Frazer died on 20 January 2018.
