= William Robert Gorham Ebun Priddy =

- Born: 1926; Victoria, Cameroon
- Died: 2003 (aged 76–77)
- Education: University of Leeds
- Occupation: Sierra Leone Creole physician
- Employer: Connaught Hospital

William Robert Gorham Ebun Priddy, or Bill Priddy or Willie Priddy (1926–2003) was a prominent Creole physician. Priddy was one of the most successful and notable Creole doctors and he worked at Connaught Hospital in Freetown, Sierra Leone. Priddy studied at Leeds University in 1956 after winning a prestigious scholarship. Priddy was also elevated to the fellowship of Royal College of Obstetricians and Gynaecologists (FRCOG).

== Early life ==
Bill Priddy was born in 1926 in Victoria, Cameroon to Sierra Leone Creole parents of Barbadian, Jamaican Maroon, African American, and Liberated African descent, Alvan Priddy and Rebecca Priddy, née Dove.

== Education ==
Priddy went to Ebenezer Primary school in Freetown, and later attended the Prince of Wales School (Freetown, Sierra Leone), where his academic achievements were recognized and he won his scholarship.

== Background ==
Priddy was married to Betty De Moes and later on to Sento. Priddy had five children and eleven grandchildren, and his son Alvan studied in England.

== Sources ==
- Beckles, H. (2004). Great House Rules: Landless Emancipation and Workers' Protest in Barbados, 1838-1938. I. Randle. p. 92. ISBN 9789766370855.
- Egerton, Luke; Priddy, Alvan (2003). "Ebun Willie Robert Gorham Priddy". British Medical Journal. 327 (7423): 1112. doi:10.1136/bmj.327.7423.1112-d. PMC 261784.
- http://www.bmimakeanenquiry.co.uk/gynaehealth/whp_consultants_detail.cfm?consultant_id=8588
