= Nanette Thomas =

Sierra Leonian politician

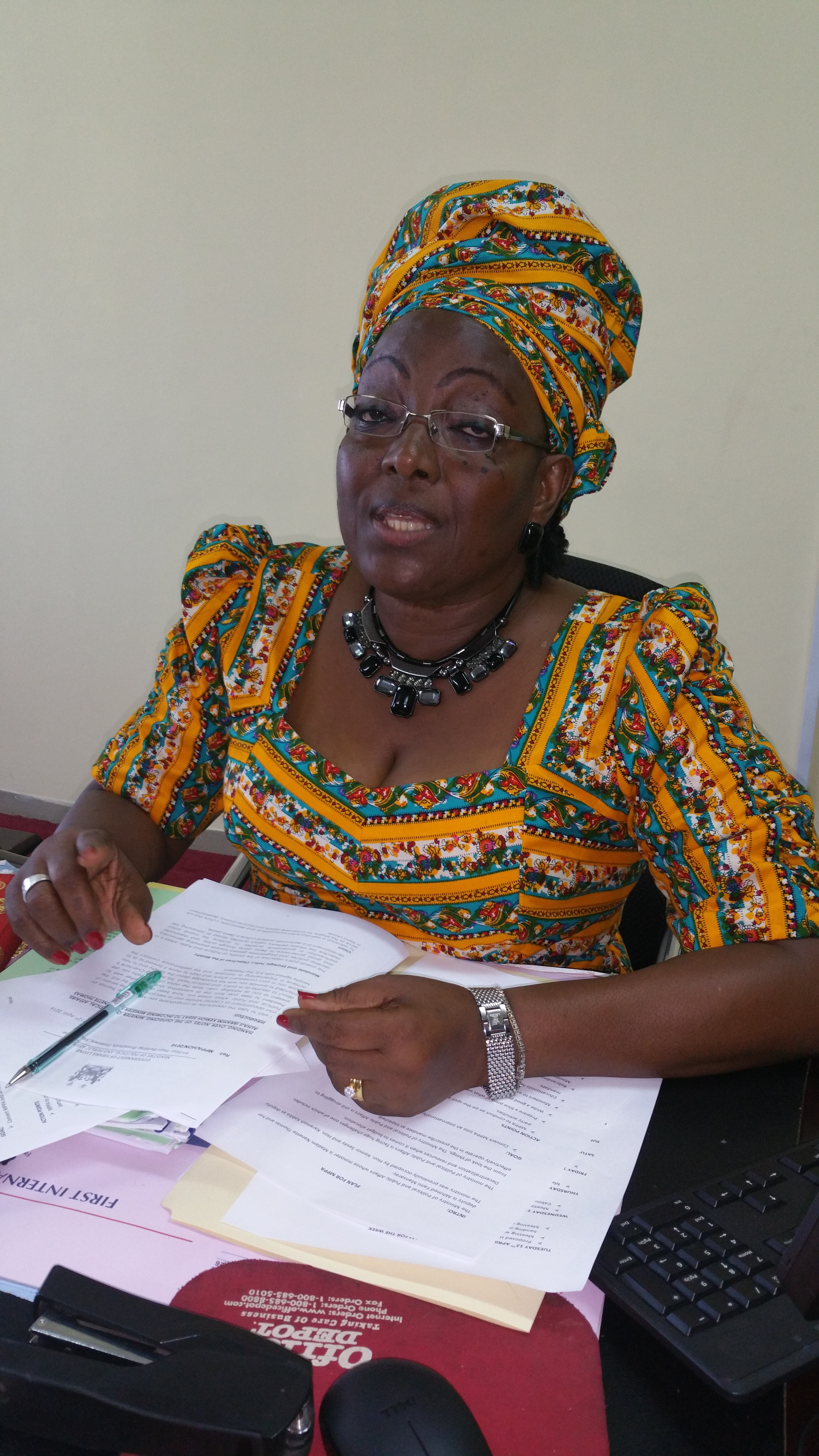
- Nanette Thomas on her first day in the Cabinet of Sierra Leone.

Minister of Political and Public Affairs
- In office April 2016 – April 2018

Nanette Beatrice Effulabi Thomas (born c. 1956) is a politician in Sierra Leone. She served as minister of political and public affairs from 2016 to 2018.

== Political career ==
Nanette Thomas is a longtime member of the All People's Congress party, which has been the country's main opposition party since losing power in 2018.

After fleeing the country during the Sierra Leone Civil War (1991–2002), she lived for a time in Texas, where she led the APC's Dallas chapter.

In 2011, she returned to Sierra Leone to become the national coordinator of the country's Attitudinal and Behavioral Change program, established by President Ernest Bai Koroma.

The following year, she was named Activist of the Year by the country's National Commission for Democracy, for her work on "attitudinal and behavioral change" as well as women's issues, anti-corruption efforts, and other activism.

She was appointed minister of political and public affairs in Koroma's government in 2016, becoming the first woman to hold the position.

Since leaving the cabinet in 2018, when President Julius Maada Bio took office, Thomas has continued her involvement in APC party politics, particularly its Women's Wing.
