= Gaston Bart-Williams =

Sierra Leonean journalist (1938–1990)

- Born: 3 March 1938; Freetown
- Died: 1990 (aged 51–52)
- Occupations: journalist, film director, novelist, poet, diplomat and activist.

Gaston Bart-Williams (1938–1990) was a Sierra Leonean journalist, film director, novelist, poet, diplomat and activist. He lived and worked mainly in Germany.

== Life ==
Gaston Bart-Williams was born in Freetown on 3 March 1938 to Sierra Leone Creole parents. He was educated at the Prince of Wales School in Freetown and then Bo School in Bo. He founded the African Youth Cultural Society in 1958, and was Sierra Leone's delegate at the 1959 World Assembly of Youth in Bamako, Mali.

From 1961 to 1963, Bart-Williams studied theatre direction in the UK under Clifford Williams. He won the London Writers' Poetry Award in 1962, and the Michael Karolji International Award in 1963. In 1964, he won a cultural grant from the German London Embassy. He settled in Cologne, where he worked as a freelance writer and film director.

== Plays ==
- A Bouquet of Carnations
- In Praise of Madness
- Uhuru

=== Films ===
- Zur Nacht, 1967
- Immer nur Mordgeschichten, 1968

== Personal life ==
He is the father of German reggae singer Patrice Bart-Williams.
