= John Augustus Abayomi-Cole =

Dr. John Augustus Abayomi-Cole (1848–1943) was a Sierra Leonean Christian minister, medical doctor and herbalist.

== Early life ==
Abayomi-Cole was born in Ilorin, Nigeria in 1848. He was educated in Sierra Leone first in a school set up by A. B. C. Sibthorpe. His secondary education was at C. M. S. Grammar School (now known as Sierra Leone Grammar School) in Freetown. He later attended Fourah Bay College where he trained as a medical doctor.

== Christian ministry ==
On graduating from secondary school Abayomi-Cole taught at the Evangelical United Brethren Church School. In his mid-twenties he travelled to the United States (U.S.) to continue his studies. Whilst in the U. S. he was ordained a Minister in the American Wesleyan Methodist church. He attended their General Conference in 1887, where he pleaded for missionaries to be sent to Sierra Leone. This led to a small mission led by Rev. Henry Johnston being dispatched there in 1889. Abayomi as part of this mission became superintendent of the Maroon Chapel but differences with the congregation led to his resignation. By 1905 Abayomi-Cole had set up his own church, the Gospel Mission Hall.

== Intervention in the Religion–Science Debates ==
According to Judith Bachmann, Cole’s position should be understood as an active intervention in the global debates on religion and science at the end of the nineteenth century. He criticized scientific materialism and reinterpreted African traditionell practices and nativ Church as “true science and true religion” in harmony with natural law(understood, for instance, though concepts such as animal magnetism within Theosophical discourse). This position did not amount to a rejection of Christianity; rather, it involved a critical distancing from what Cole perceived as a corrupted form of European missionary Christianity, combined with the claim that a true form of Christianity could be re-established on the basis of African traditional knowledge. Bachmann situates this position in close relation to esoteric discourses associated with the Theosophical Society, which emphasized the ultimate unity of religion and science, the critique of materialism, and the recovery of true religion and true knowledge. By drawing on these premises, Cole articulated African traditional knowledge as capable of accessing universal truth claims. His case is therefore assessed as an example of how, within contexts of global entanglements, non-European intellectuals did not passively adopt modern categories such as science, religion, or secularity, but actively exercised as agency in their ongoing reconfiguration.

== Herbalist ==
Following his departure from the Maroon Chapel Abayomi ventured into growing herbs and spices. Initially starting with ginger, which was in high demand in Europe, he expanded to farm a range of other crops and branched into using herbs and spices to treat common ailments such as rheumatism. The popularity of Abayomi-Cole's herbalism led to him becoming a medical adviser to the Sierra Leone governor Leslie Probyn.

Due to his commitment to sustainable farming methods and crop diversification, Abayomi-Cole founded the Sierra Leone Farmers' Association in 1909 and the Agricultural Society in 1922.

== Political career ==
Abayomi-Cole was a member of the Sierra Leone National Defence Fund set up in 1908 to support Africans subjected to racial bias accusations by the British colonialists.

== Works ==
- The Hope of Sherbro's Future Greatness: A Lecture Delivered at Shaingay (1885) Dayton, Ohio: United Brethren Publishing House
- Revelation of the Secret Orders of Western Africa: Including an Explanation of the Beliefs and Customs of African Heathenism (1886) Dayton, Ohio: United Brethren Publishing House
