= Adesanya Kwamina Hyde =

Sierra Leonean ambassador

Sierra Leonean Ambassador to the United States of Sierra Leone to United States
- In office January 18, 1968 / January 19, 1968 – October 2, 1969
- Preceded by: Christopher Okoro Cole
- Succeeded by: John Akar

Personal details
- Born: September 4, 1915 Murray Town, Sierra Leone, Greater Freetown area
- Spouse: Kainde Adebong Locosie
- Children: Adesanya Keith Hyde (son), Isatu Latilewa Hyde (daughter), Oluwole Nimneh Hyde (son), Serah Hyde (daughter)
- Parent: Jonathan Gustavus Hyde of Murray Town, Sierra Leone (father)
- Education: Sierra Leone Grammar School
- Alma mater: Cambridge University and London University

Adesanya Kwamina Hyde 1968 New Year Honours C.B.E. (born September 4, 1915; died 1993) was a Sierra Leonean ambassador to the United States.

== Early life ==
Adesanya Kwamina Hyde was born on 4 September 1915 to Sierra Leone Creole parents, Jonathan Gustavus Hyde and Christiana Fraser.

== Career ==
- From 1941 to 1945, during the Second World War he was enlisted in the Royal Air Force.
- In November 1944 he was awarded the Distinguished Flying Cross.
- After demobilization he joined the Colonial Service#Colonial Administrative Service.
- From 1948 to 1951 he was Assistant District Commissioner.
- From 1951 to 1960 he was District Commissioner.
- In 1960 he was Permanent Secretary.
- In 1961 he was Provincial Secretary.
- From 1965 to 1967 he was Secretary to the Cabinet of Albert Margai.
- From 1967 to 1968 he was Secretary-General of the National Reformation Council.
- From 1968 to 1969 he was Ambassador in Washington, D C (United States)
- In 1969 he was retired from Public Service.

== The Distinguished Flying Cross ==
Short of navigators in WWII, the British Government began recruiting from Sierra Leone, one of the countries in the Empire with the best academic results in Maths. Seeing this opportunity, Hyde signed up and flew to England to fight for the Allies in the RAF, completing his training at an airbase in Shropshire in the West of England. On 9 August 1944, Flight Sergeant Ade Hyde and crew set out to bomb a flying bomb site at Les Chatelliers in Northern France. The weather was fair but cloudy. As Hyde's attacking plane neared the site, crew members saw dark puffs of anti-aircraft fire. A shell burst directly in front of Hyde's aircraft; it just missed the bomb-aimer but it caught Hyde in his right shoulder. In spite of being in terrible pain, Hyde did not tell his captain about his wounds until after the crew had bombed the target and continued to navigate back to base. For his bravery and commitment during this flight, Hyde was awarded the Distinguished Flying Cross, a third level military honour awarded for "an act or acts of valour, courage or devotion to duty whilst flying in active operations against the enemy".

== C.B.E ==
On 1 January 1968, in the New Years Honours, Her Majesty Queen Elizabeth II awarded to Adesanya Kwamina Hyde, Esq., D.F.C. the Order of the British Empire (Civil Division) C.B.E., to be an Ordinary Commander of the Civil Division of the said Most Excellent Order. At this time, Hyde was the Secretary-General of the National Reformation Council Secretariat. The National Reformation Council were a group of senior military officers who, on 23 March 1967, reversed a military coup perpetrated by the Commander of the Armed Forces, Brigadier David Lansana. Lansana had placed the newly elected President, Siaka Stevens, under house arrest and declared martial law.
