= Samuel Bankole-Jones =

Sierra Leonean judge

Sir Samuel Bankole-Jones

Chief Justice of Sierra Leone
- In office 1963–1965
- Preceded by: Salako Benka-Coker
- Succeeded by: Gershon Collier

Personal details
- Born: Samuel Bankole-Jones; 1911
- Died: 1981 (aged 69–70)
- Profession: Jurist, Justice

Sir Samuel Bankole-Jones (1911- 1981) was a Sierra Leonean judge of the Supreme Court and later Chancellor of the University of Sierra Leone. He was awarded a Knighthood of the British Empire in 1965.

== Early life and education ==
Born in 1911 to Sierra Leone Creole parents, Bankole-Jones attended Methodist Boys' High School in Freetown and later Fourah Bay College, where he graduated with a Bachelor of Arts degree in 1932. He later attended Durham University, followed by the Middle Temple, before being called to the Bar in 1938.

== Career and legal luminary ==
Bankole-Jones worked as a magistrate, a puisne judge, before his appointment as Chief Justice in 1963. He became the first Sierra Leonean president of the Court of Appeal in 1965. He was later appointed as Chancellor of the University of Sierra Leone in 1969 and Judge of the Supreme Court in 1971.
