= Hannah Benka-Coker =

Sierra Leone-born educator

Hannah Benka-Coker MBE
- Born: Hannah R Luke; 1903; British Sierra Leone
- Died: 17 June 1952 (aged 48–49)
- Education: Portway Institute in England
- Known for: A founder of the Freetown Secondary School for Girls
- Spouse: S A Benka-Coker
- Children: 2

Hannah Benka-Coker, MBE, née Luke (1903 – 17 June 1952) was an educator from Sierra Leone. She was one of the founders of the Freetown Secondary School for Girls (FSSG) which was established in 1926.

== Personal life and education ==
Born Hannah R Luke to Creole parents in British Sierra Leone, she was educated at the Annie Walsh Memorial School in Sierra Leone and Portway Institute in England. She married Justice S A Benka-Coker from the Gambia. She died in June 1952, aged 49.

== Freetown Secondary School for Girls ==
She organized a group of close family members and friends to plan a school that would offer a comprehensive, world-class education program for girls. One of her friends was Maisie Osora, the British wife of a Sierra Leonean clergyman, who was a teacher at the Annie Walsh Memorial School.

On 20 January 1926, the Freetown Secondary School for Girls opened at Garrison and Gloucester Streets with a student body of twenty girls. Osora was principal and Benka-Coker was vice-principal.

The Freetown School for Girls was the only school that had classes from Kindergarten through Secondary School.

Eventually, Hannah became the school principal. During her tenure she accepted students from all over West Africa regardless of creed or tribe. The school moved to Tower Hill in Freetown and became a boarding school. Students flocked from The Gambia, The Gold Coast and Nigeria.

In 1944, Benka-Coker was awarded an MBE for her services to education.

== Girl Guides ==
Benka-Coker was a member of the Girl Guide movement for over twenty years. Roles included commissioner for Sierra Leone Girl Guides and the first Africa Colony commissioner.

== Other ==
Benka-Coker was president of both the Sierra Leone Women's Movement and the Annie Walsh Old Girls Association.

== Legacy ==
Her contributions to the education of girls and women were lauded in Sierra Leone and internationally.

Benka-Coker has since had a statue erected in her honour.

== See also ==
- Women in Sierra Leone
- Index of Sierra Leone–related articles
- George Beresford-Stooke
- Annie Walsh Memorial School
