= Salako Benka-Coker =

Sir Salako Benka-Coker

Chief Justice of Sierra Leone
- In office 1960–1963
- Preceded by: Vahe Robert Bairamian
- Succeeded by: Samuel Bankole Jones

Personal details
- Born: Salako Benka-Coker; 1900
- Died: 1965 (aged 64–65)
- Profession: Jurist, Justice

Sir Salako Ambrosius Benka-Coker (1900–1965) was a Sierra Leonean judge of the Supreme Court and the first African to hold the position of Chief Justice of the newly independent state. He was awarded a Knighthood of the British Empire in 1961.

== Early life and education ==
Born in 1900 to Sierra Leone Creole parents, Benka-Coker attended the Sierra Leone Grammar School in Freetown and later Fourah Bay College, where he graduated with a Bachelor of Arts degree in 1916. He later attended Durham University, followed by the Middle Temple before being called to the Bar in 1926.

== Career and legal luminary ==
Benka-Coker established a private legal practice in Bathurst, Gambia before accepting an appointment in 1943 as Crown Counsel in Sierra Leone. Between 1953 and 1957, he was attorney-general before his appointment as Chief Justice in 1960.
