= Olayinka Koso-Thomas =

Nigerian-born doctor (born 1937)

Dr. Olayinka Koso-Thomas
- Born: 1937 (age 88–89)
- Citizenship: Nigeria, Sierra Leone
- Occupation: Doctor
- Medical career
- Awards: Prince of Asturias Award

Olayinka Koso-Thomas who was born in 1937 is a Nigerian-born doctor who lives in Sierra Leone. She is internationally recognised for her efforts to abolish female genital cutting. In 1998, she shared a Prince of Asturias Award for her work. Her study of the practice in Sierra Leone highlights its important role in the traditional initiations of females into both womanhood and society in parts of West Africa.

== Medical Career ==
Dr. Koso-Thomas pursued a career in medicine and became renowned for her work in obstetrics and gynecology. She gained further recognition for her research on female genital mutilation (FGM) and its health impacts, particularly in Sierra Leone.

== Advocacy and Research on Female Circumcision ==
Dr. Koso-Thomas gained international recognition for her work on female circumcision, also referred to as female genital mutilation (FGM). She authored the book Circumcision of Women: A Strategy for Eradication (1987), which analyse both the cultural and health impacts of FGM and strategies for its eradication in countries where the practice is prevalent.
