= Yvonne Aki-Sawyerr =

Politician and accountant, current Mayor of Freetown, Sierra Leone

Yvonne Aki-Sawyerr OBE
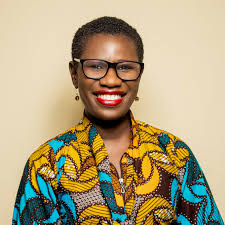

Mayor of Freetown
- Incumbent
- Assumed office 11 May 2018
- Preceded by: Sam Franklyn Gibson

Personal details
- Born: Yvonne Denise Aki-Sawyerr; January 7, 1968 (age 58) Freetown, British Dominion of Sierra Leone
- Party: All People's Congress (APC)
- Education: Fourah Bay College, London School of Economics
- Profession: Accountant
- Website: Official Website

Yvonne Denise Aki-Sawyerr, OBE (née Morgan; born 7 January 1968) is a Sierra Leonean politician and finance professional, who is serving as the current mayor of Freetown, Sierra Leone's capital and largest city; she assumed office on 11 May 2018. Prior to becoming head of the Freetown City Council, Aki-Sawyer had worked extensively in the UK financial and professional services industry. She had also taken either pioneering or crucial roles in various charity and public service projects in the UK and Sierra Leone, including participation in the fight against Ebola in 2014 and the subsequent recovery initiatives.

== Early life and education ==
Yvonne Denise Aki-Sawyerr (née Morgan) was born on 7 January 1968 in Freetown, in the British Dominion of Sierra Leone (present day Sierra Leone). She is a member of Sierra Leone's Creole ethnic group. She attended St. Joseph's Secondary School in Freetown where she was head girl and Loreto House Captain.

Aki-Sawyerr graduated with honours from Fourah Bay College in 1988 where she earned a bachelor's degree in Economics. At university, she was active with AIESEC (the International Association of Students in Economics and Management) and she became the first African on AIESEC's Brussels-based International Exchange Committee in 1988.

She earned a master's degree in International Relations and Politics of the World Economy at the London School of Economics and Political Science. In 1993, she received her certification from the Institute of Chartered Accountants in England and Wales.

== Career ==
=== Private sector ===
Mayor Aki-Sawyerr is a Chartered Accountant, and has a private sector experience of over 25 years in roles such as providing strategic planning, project management, risk management, corporate governance and regulatory consulting services to high profile clients in the UK financial services industry. She began working for professional services firm Arthur Andersen in 1990. She became the Investment Director of IDEA (Inspiring Digital Enterprise Award) in 2009, in which she was tasked for raising international finance to fund projects, and the management of local stakeholder groups.

=== Charity and other endeavours ===
In 1999, Aki-Sawyerr co-founded the charity Sierra Leone War Trust (SLWT), which aimed to promote humanitarian, social and welfare conditions of children and youth in Sierra Leone.

During the Ebola outbreak in Sierra Leone in 2014, she led a campaign in the UK with the aim of increasing international awareness about the outbreak. She took a sabbatical leave from IDEA and joined Sierra Leone's National Ebola Response Centre (NERC), and became the director of planning. She relocated to Sierra Leone and recruited volunteers to work in the Ebola Treatment Centres.

=== Politics and public service ===
Before vying for the top position at Freetown City Council, Aki-Sawyerr worked as a key member of the President's Recovery Priorities (PRP), serving as delivery Team Lead, from January 2016 to October 2017. PRP was the second phase of a multi-stakeholder programme aimed at driving sustainable socio-economic transformation in Sierra Leone after the Ebola crisis. She played a crucial role in the design and implementation of "Operation Clean Freetown" which was part of the PRP programme that focused on introducing a sustainable system of household waste collection in the city of Freetown.

Aki-Sawyerr has been the mayor of Freetown since taking office on 11 May 2018 after winning a total of 309,000 votes representing 59.92% of the votes cast in the mayoral election. She is a member of the All People's Congress (APC) political party - one of the two political parties, alongside the Sierra Leone People's Party (SLPP), that have dominated Sierra Leone politics since independence from the United Kingdom.

In January 2023, Aki-Sawyerr is set to run for another term in the June 2023 elections.

== Personal life ==
Aki-Sawyerr is married and has two children.

== Awards and honours ==
Aki-Sawyerr was recognized for her work during Sierra Leone's Ebola crisis with an Ebola Gold Medal by then president of Sierra Leone Ernest Bai Koroma in December 2015.

She was made an Officer of the Order of the British Empire (OBE) by Queen Elizabeth II in January 2016.

Aki-Sawyerr was featured in the BBC documentary Mayor on the Frontline: Democracy in Crisis. The documentary follows her work as mayor, and her battle to be re-elected.

Aki-Sawyerr was on the list of the BBC's 100 Women (BBC) announced on 23 November 2020.

In February 2021, Time Magazine named her as one of Time's "100 Next" honorees.

In 2021, Aki-Sawyerr was selected as a Bloomberg New Economy Catalyst. As part of the program, she attended the annual New Economy Forum held in Singapore, and the Bloomberg New Economy Catalyst Retreat that same year.
