= Violet Showers Johnson =

Nigerian-American historian

- Born: Lagos
- Citizenship: Sierra Leone
- Education: Fourah Bay College University of New Brunswick
- Occupation: academic historian
- Employer: Agnes Scott College

Violet Showers Johnson is professor of history and director of Africana studies at Texas A&M University.

Johnson was born in Lagos, Nigeria to Sierra Leone Creole parents and grew up in Nigeria and Sierra Leone. She received a Bachelor of Arts in history from Fourah Bay College (1985) in Sierra-Leone. While earning her degree, she taught at the university from 1983-85. She then earned a Master of Arts in American history from the University of New Brunswick (1982) in Canada and a Doctor of Philosophy in history from Boston College (1992) in the United States.

Johnson worked at Agnes Scott College in the United States from 1995 to 2005. She started as the college's founding director of the Africana Studies Program (1995-2002, 2011-2012), then served as a professor in the college's history department. She was also the college's founding director of the Women’s Global Leadership Center (2008-2010). In 2012, she joined Texas A&M University as a professor, eventually working both at the main campus in the United States (2012-present) and the university's campus in Qatar (2022-present). While at Texas A&M, she has been director of the university's Africana Studies Program, among other administrative positions.

Johnson is a naturalized citizen of the United States.

== Books ==
=== As author ===
- Johnson, Violet Showers (2006). The Other Black Bostonians: West Indians in Boston, 1900-1950. Bloomington: Indiana University Press. ISBN 0-253-34752-1.
- Halter, Marilyn; Johnson, Violet Showers (2014). African & American: West Africans in Post-Civil Rights America. New York: New York University Press. ISBN 978-0-814-76070-3.

=== As editor ===
- Soto, Isabel; Johnson, Violet Showers, eds. (2011). Western Fictions, Black Realities: Meanings of Blackness and Modernities. Michigan State University Press. ISBN 978-1-611-86044-3.
- Johnson, Violet Showers; Graml, Gundolf; Lessane, Patricia Williams, eds. (2018). Deferred Dreams, Defiant Struggles: Critical Perspectives on Blackness, Belonging and Civil Rights. Liverpool University Press. ISBN 978-1-786-94033-9.
