= Denton Guy-Williams =

Sierra Leonean sprinter

Personal information
- Nationality: Sierra Leonean
- Born: 8 May 1972 (age 54)

Sport
- Sport: Sprinting
- Event: 4 × 100 metres relay

Denton Gavin Guy-Williams (born 8 May 1972) is a Sierra Leonean sprinter. He competed in the men's 4 × 100 metres relay at the 1992 Summer Olympics.
