= John Leigh (ambassador) =

Sierra Leonean diplomat

John Ernst Leigh was an ambassador for Sierra Leone to the United States who served during the Sierra Leone Civil War. Leigh was also a presidential candidate for the Sierra Leone People's Party during the 2007 presidential elections in Sierra Leone.

== Family background ==
John Leigh grew up in Cline Town, Sierra Leone, and alongside his other brother Frederick, attended Albert Academy in Freetown. John Leigh was the son of a Sierra Leonean father of Creole descent and a Mende Sierra Leonean mother. John Leigh's father, Evelyn Leslie Foy Leigh was a civil servant and his family descended from the original Nova Scotian Settlers.
