= Herbert George-Williams =

Sierra Leonean politician

Herbert George-Williams is a Sierra Leonean politician and the former mayor of Freetown. He is from the All People's Congress (APC) political party On January 17, 2008, George-Williams replaced ousted mayor Winstanley Bankole Johnson. Like Johnson, George-Williams also belongs to the Creole ethnic group. He was removed from office on various corruption charges but in the subsequent trial almost all were dismissed.
