= Krio Descendants Union =

The Krio Descendants Union or (formerly) the Creole Descendants Union is an offshoot of the 'Settlers' Descendants Union' which was founded to unite the Creole people and the Oku people during the decolonisation era. The Krio Descendants Union was founded as the Creole Descendants Union by George T.O. Robinson, a Creole civil servant who served as the first President of the organisation. The organization's current president is Cassandra Garber, who was a former teacher at the Freetown Secondary School for Girls. In Freetown, Sierra Leone the union is called the 'Krio Descendants Yunion' in the Krio and it is abbreviated as KDY.

== Settlers' Descendants Union ==
The 'Settlers' Descendants' Union' was among the first organizations which organized and united Krios to become politically active despite not being in itself a political party. The Settlers Descendants Union was established in 1952 by Johann Christianus Lucan, who served as President of the Union, Ephraim Jonathan Robinson, Vice President, and Nicholas Asgill. The Settlers' Descendants Union mounted costly actions in the British Courts against the independence settlement.

== Formation of the Krio Descendants Union ==
In 1990, the 'Settlers' Descendants Union' was given new berth and was re-established as the Creole Descendants Union. The founding members of the present-day Krio Descendants Union included George T.O. Robinson, the younger brother of Ephraim J. Robinson, Samuel Stober Taylor, Wilward Arthur Cummings, Daisy Myers, Charles B. Jones, Rosaland Claudius-Cole, George Fewry, Emanuel Fraser-Davies, and H.M. James.

== The Krio Descendants Union ==
The union helps to unite the causes of the Creoles (who still experience some discrimination today) and recently marked the anniversary of the founding of Freetown, Sierra Leone and the abolishment of the slave trade with a press release. KDY also is trying to renew links with African Americans and donated $1000 to victims of Hurricane Katrina.
