= George Gurney Nicol =

George Gurney Mather Nicol (1856–1888) was a Sierra Leonean clergyman. He was the first African from a British colony to be educated at Cambridge University.

== Life ==
George Gurney Mather Nicol was born into an elite Sierra Leone Creole family: he was a grandson of Samuel Ajayi Crowther, and the son of the mathematics teacher and clergyman George Croley Nicol. Born on 22 February 1856 at Freetown, he was educated in England, at Monkton Combe School and Sydney College, Bath. In 1879 he graduated BA from Corpus Christi College, Cambridge. He went on to the Church Missionary Society College, Islington and was ordained in 1883.

After graduation, Nicol returned to Sierra Leone. Like his father, he taught mathematics at Fourah Bay College, and became a Colonial Chaplain. Ordained deacon in 1883, he became a curate at Church of the Holy Trinity, Freetown. In 1885 he was ordained priest, and became Pastor of Sherbro Island.

He died on 15 August 1888.
