= Bunny Mack =

Sierra Leonean musician, singer, songwriter and performer

Cecil Bunting MacCormack popularly known professionally as Bunny Mack born 3 December 1945 – 11 July 2015) was a Sierra Leonean musician, singer, songwriter and performer. He was best known for his song "Let Me Love You".

== Early life ==
Mack was born in Freetown, Sierra Leone. He began playing the harmonica and penny-whistle at the age of six. He made his first public appearance when at the age of eight, and played with friends in the band called The Daverns

== Career ==
Bunny Mack rose to fame and became popular in the global music scene after the release of his song "Let Me Love You", which became a disco hit in 1981. He was voted Musician of the Year by African Muzik Magazine and received a Gold Disc for "Let Me Love You". In November 2009, American rapper Wale made a remix version of the song that was included on the album Attention Deficit. The song was also featured in the British music Charts In 2014, the remix version of the song LET ME LOVE YOU was also featured on Capital Xtra Afro beats Top 10 Music Charts on a new version called "My Sweetie". Mack died in London on 11 July 2015.
