= Albert Cole (footballer) =

Sierra Leonean footballer

Personal information
- Full name: Albert Cole
- Date of birth: July 7, 1981 (age 45)
- Place of birth: Freetown, Sierra Leone
- Height: 1.83 m (6 ft 0 in)
- Position: Midfielder

Senior career*
Years	Team	Apps	(Gls)
1997–1998	Mighty Blackpool		
1998–1999	Empoli	0	(0)
2000–2014	Raufoss	218+	(10)

International career
2008	Sierra Leone	2	(0)
- * Club domestic league appearances and goals

Albert Cole (born 7 July 1981 in Freetown) is a Sierra Leonean former international footballer, who played as a midfielder until his retirement in 2014.

He began his career with local club Mighty Blackpool in the Sierra Leonean Premier League.
