= Harry Sawyerr (theologian) =

Sierra Leonean theologian (1909–1986)

Harry Alphonso Ebun Sawyerr MBE (9 October 1909 – August 1986) was a Sierra Leonean Anglican theologian and writer on African religion. He became principal of Fourah Bay College and Vice Chancellor of the University of Sierra Leone.

Sawyerr studied initially at Fourah Bay College, later moving to England to study at the main campus of Durham University. He successively earned Bachelor of Arts (1933), Master of Arts (1936) and Master of Education (1940) degrees.

Harry Sawyerr was influenced by Thomas Sylvester Johnson, the first assistant bishop of Sierra Leone.

== Works ==
- Creative Evangelism: towards a new Christian encounter with Africa, London: Lutterworth, 1968.
- God: Ancestor or Creator? Aspects of traditional belief in Ghana, Nigeria & Sierra Leone, London: Longmans, 1970
- "The Earth-Goddess" in Founders of Religions: Christianity and Other Religions. Rome: Gregorian University Press, 1984.
- The Practice of Presence: Shorter Writings of Harry Sawyerr. Ed. John Parratt. Grand Rapids: Eerdmans, 1996.
- "Sacrifice" in Biblical Revelation and African Beliefs. Ed. Kwesi Dickson and Paul Ellingworth, 57-82. London: Lutterworth Press, 1969.
- (with William Thomas Harris.) The Springs of Mende Belief and Conduct: a discussion of the influence of the belief in the supernatural among the Mende Freetown: Sierra Leone Univ. Press, 1968.
- "Traditions in Transit" in Religion in a Pluralistic Society, ed. J. S. Pobee, 85-96. Leiden: E. J. Brill, 1976.
