= Bankole Timothy =

Sierra Leonean journalist, author and editor (1923–1994)

- Born: Emmanuel Bankole Timothy; 3 July 1923; Freetown, Sierra Leone
- Died: 20 June 1994 (aged 70)
- Education: Methodist Boys' High School
- Occupations: Journalist, author, editor
- Known for: Biographer of Albert Margai, Kwame Nkrumah

Emmanuel Bankole Timothy (3 July 1923 – 20 June 1994) was a Sierra Leonean journalist. He was also an author and wrote biographies of Albert Margai, prime minister of Sierra Leone (1964–67), and Kwame Nkrumah, president of Ghana (1960–66). Timothy served for many years as editor of the Daily Graphic in Accra.

== Biography ==
Emmanuel Bankole Timothy was born in Freetown, Sierra Leone, on 3 July 1923 to Creole parents. He attended the Methodist Boys' High School in Freetown, where, as senior prefect, he was already establishing himself as a journalist by writing for the Sierra Leone Weekly News. In 1941, he became a clerk in the confidential branch of the Colonial Secretary's Office where, among many other issues, the question of illicit diamond buying was one of the major concerns. Unbeknown to Timothy, the diamond industry would become very much a part of his life when he later joined the Diamond Corporation West Africa Limited (DICORWAF).

After school in 1943, he attended the University Tutorial College in London, England, hoping to prepare himself for a career in dentistry, a vocation his father was keen for him to follow. His guardian then was the famous Methodist minister, the Reverend William Sangster. During this time, Timothy began freelancing articles and also acted as London correspondent for the Sierra Leone Weekly News, Ashanti Pioneer and some Asian newspapers. In addition, he gave interviews on current affairs for the BBC radio and broadcast some of his poetry. In 1945, he joined the Daily Express, where he was given a trial assignment, before the proprietor at the time, Lord Beaverbrook, employed him as a general reporter. The Daily Express gave Timothy a great deal of international experience, as his assignments involved travelling to North Africa and Jamaica.

In 1950, the Daily Express appointed him a parliamentary reporter for the paper in London. It was during this period that he was able to secure an exclusive interview with Sir Seretse Khama, who at that time was in dispute with the British government. Timothy looked back upon this period working for Lord Beaverbrook as one of the many highlights of his life. His second great journalistic experience was when he was appointed to Ghana's main newspaper, The Daily Graphic, in 1951. The then head of the Mirror Group, Cecil King, who was responsible for starting this Ghanaian paper, felt that Timothy was ideally suited for this particular post. His writing and features (including the column "Bankole Timothy's Notebook") became well-known and he travelled extensively in Ghana. Kaye Whiteman noted: "As assistant editor and later deputy editor, he made a name for himself with his controversial Bankole Timothy's Notebook." At this time, not long after Ghana's independence, the situation started to deteriorate for the government and, as a result of his writing, much of which was critical of the government, Timothy was deported since it was decided that his presence "was not conducive to the public good".

On 2 August 1957, Timothy left Ghana for Freetown. After a short stay there, he returned to London to further his journalistic career. He eventually became assistant editor of the Central Office of Information magazine, Commonwealth Today, and during this time he was invited to attend the Tashkent conference of African writers in the Soviet Union. In 1959, Timothy decided to return to Sierra Leone, where he joined the government's Information Services and was eventually appointed its head. He toured Sierra Leone widely and was in charge of training junior staff. He was responsible for the setting up of the publications department and he also had special responsibility for overseas publicity. His great triumph was Queen Elizabeth II's visit to Sierra Leone in 1961, when he coordinated the press arrangement; he was later awarded the MVO (Member of the Royal Victorian Order) for his work during this important visit.

In 1965, Timothy was appointed to the Diamond Corporation West Africa Limited and, after a brief period in the public relations department in Freetown, he was transferred to London. Senior management recognised Timothy's communication skills and his understanding of problems and issues relating to developing Africa. His appointment was designed to strengthen DICORWAF's relationship, as part of the Central Selling Organisation (CSO), with the major producers in West Africa and he rapidly took to his role of helping to brief senior management on West African affairs until his retirement in July 1993.

During his time with the London Diamond Companies, Timothy worked with African correspondents of the UK press and maintained contacts within diplomatic circles in the United Kingdom and abroad. These activities were part of his role within the organization.

Timothy published several books during his lifetime, notably Letters to Youth published in 1949, The Gold Coast and the Constitution (co-authored with J. H. Price) and his major achievement, which was the biography of Kwame Nkrumah, first published by Allen and Unwin in 1955 and later produced in a second edition.

Timothy was very much an Africanist. He joined the Anglo Sierra Leone Society in 1962, chaired it from 1979 to 1985, and was appointed its chief patron in 1992. A tireless supporter of this society, he was responsible for ensuring that it received a great deal of support from the London Diamond Companies.

Timothy's work in the Methodist Church was always central to his life and he was well known in UK church circles. He worked initially as a local preacher at Methodist Central Hall and then later became secretary of the circuit meeting. Timothy eventually transferred to the Hinde Street Methodist Church, where he was appointed circuit steward. He preached throughout the UK and was described as "a great and generous advocate". Timothy died at the age of 70 on 20 June 1994, after a short illness.

== Selected publications ==
- Albert Margai of Africa
- Kwame Nkrumah: His Rise to Power, Northwestern University Press (1963)
- Missionary Shepherds and African Sheep: how does Christianity as preached and practised by Europe and America appear to Africans?, Daystar Press (1971)
- Africa: Dawn or Darkness?, Davison Publishing Ltd (1976). ISBN 978-0-904130-08-9
- Kwame Nkrumah, from cradle to grave, Gavin Press (1981). ISBN 978-0-905868-06-6
- Yesterday's Africans, Delta of Nigeria (1982). ISBN 978-978-2335-95-1
