= Jamesina Essie L. King =

Sierra Leonean jurist

Jamesina Essie Leonora King is a Sierra Leonean jurist and a Commissioner of the African Commission on Human and Peoples' Rights. She is currently the Special Rapporteur on Freedom of Expression and Access to Information in Africa and Country Rapporteur for Eritrea, Namibia, Somalia, The Gambia, and Zimbabwe. She was the first Sierra Leonean to be sworn in as a Commissioner of the African Commission on Human and Peoples Rights. Previously, she was the first Chairperson of the Human Rights Commission of Sierra Leone, and was a Commissioner in the Human Rights Commission of Sierra Leone from 1996 to 2016.
