= Akintola J.G. Wyse =

Sierra Leonean academic

- Born: 20. Century
- Died: 5 October 2002
- Citizenship: Sierra Leone
- Occupation: writer
- Employer: Fourah Bay College

Professor Akintola Josephus Gustavus Wyse was an ethnic Sierra Leone Creole and Professor of History at Fourah Bay College in Freetown, Sierra Leone, until his death in October 2002. Wyse was the author of H.C. Bankole-Bright and Politics in Colonial Sierra Leone 1919-1958 (Cambridge University Press, 2003, ISBN 978-0-521-53333-1) and The Krio of Sierra Leone: An Interpretive History (Hurst and International African Institute, 1989, ISBN 978-1-85065-031-7). He also chaired the Public Services Commission of Sierra Leone until his death.
