= Emmanuel Cole =

- Born: 1908
- Died: 1972 (aged 63–64)
- Occupation: Sierra Leonean soldier

Emmanuel Cole (1908–1972) was a Sierra Leonean soldier who organised a strike against poor treatment in 1939. Cole's efforts led the British to provide improved conditions of service to Sierra Leonean soldiers of the Royal West African Frontier Force and for other RWAFF soldiers throughout British West Africa.

== Early life ==
Emmanuel Cole was born in 1908 in Freetown, the capital of Sierra Leone to poor Creole parents. After he graduated from secondary school in 1926, he immediately joined the Royal West African Frontier Force at the age of eighteen. He was attached to the Royal Artillery at the heavy battery in Murray Town Barracks in Freetown.

== Protest ==
In January 1939, Cole convinced a group of his fellow Sierra Leonean soldiers to join him in sending a letter of protest to their commanding officer, complaining that their pay was not enough to meet expenses. Cole and his fellow soldiers also demanded to be treated in the same way as white soldiers of the same rank and most significantly they demanded boots and other forms of footwear.

The Inspector-General of the West African Frontier Force had recommended boots for the soldiers as early as 1903, but their white officers preferred the African soldiers to remain barefoot. When the commanding officer ridiculed the soldiers' demands, Cole asked bluntly: "Is our flesh different from that of the white gunners?," and when their demands received no consideration, Cole organised a strike. They refused to dress properly or to come to parade until their demands were accepted.

Cole and his fellow soldiers were charged with mutiny, a crime carrying severe punishment under the military code. Throughout the court martial proceedings, Cole remained defiant. The military court sentenced Emmanuel Cole to fifteen years in prison and his fellow soldiers to period ranging down to eighty-four days, but Labour MPs in Britain protested at the sentencing, until Cole and the others were pardoned.

Soon after the mutiny, Cole's demands for boots and improved conditions of service were officially enacted, applying to both Sierra Leonean soldiers and other soldiers throughout British West Africa.
