= Patrick Omolade Hamilton =

Sierra Leonean judge

The Honourable Justice Patrick Omolade Hamilton

Justice of the Supreme Court of Sierra Leone
- Incumbent
- Assumed office January 22, 2009
- Nominated by: Ernest Bai Koroma

Personal details
- Born: 15 September 1948 Freetown, Sierra Leone
- Died: 7 July 2018 (aged 69) Freetown
- Party: None
- Spouse: Joyce Hamilton nee King {Divorced
- Children: 4
- Education: Albert Academy
- Profession: Judge

Patrick Omolade Hamilton (born 1948) is a Sierra Leone judge and an associate justice in the Supreme Court of Sierra Leone. He had previously served as a judge in the Sierra Leone High Court and the Sierra Leone Court of Appeal. He was appointed as a Supreme Court justice by Sierra Leone's president Ernest Bai Koroma and took office on January 22, 2009, after being confirmed by the Sierra Leone Parliament.

== Early life ==
Patrick Omolade Hamilton was born and raised in Freetown, Sierra Leone's capital city to Krio parents.His father Samuel Hamilton was of Nigerian decent whilst his mother Elizabeth Talabi Hamilton was of Krio decent.Patrick was the first of five children.His father was an accountant who worked for the Sierra Leone High Commission in the United Kingdom in the 1970's Whilst his mum Elizabeth was a devoted house wife. He started his primary education at the Kissy Primary School and then later proceeded to the Albert Academy where he did his GCE O and A levels. Patrick later on went to study Economics in Sierra Leone before proceeding to study law in Nigeria and the United Kingdom where he was called to the bar.

== Law profession ==
Patrick Omolade Hamilton studied Law in the United Kingdom before returning to Sierra Leone in 1977. He started his law profession in Freetown as a State Counsel; three years later, he was made a Magistrate Judge. He soon rose his rank to a High Court Judge and Appeals Court Judge and as a Supreme Court Judge.
