= Enid Forde =

Sierra Leonean geographer (1932–2010)

Enid Rosamund Ayodele Forde
- Born: 23 January 1932; Freetown, Sierra Leone
- Died: 27 January 2010 (aged 78)
- Education: Fourah Bay College; Northwestern University
- Occupation: Geographer
- Known for: First Sierra Leonean woman to gain a PhD

Enid Rosamund Ayodele Forde (23 January 1932–27 January 2010) was a Sierra Leonean geographer. She was the first Sierra Leonean woman to gain a PhD, and after her return to Africa from the United States, she chaired the geography department at Fourah Bay College.

== Life and career ==
Enid Rosamund Ayodele Forde was born in Freetown, Sierra Leone, and attended Buxton Primary School. She went on to complete studies at the Annie Walsh Memorial Secondary School, which led her to attend Fourah Bay College and Leeds University United Kingdom. She gained her PhD at Northwestern University in 1966, with her dissertation, “The Population of Ghana: A Study of the Spatial Relationships of Its Sociocultural and Economic Characteristics."

After completing her doctorate at Northwestern in 1966, at age 34, Forde decided to return to her native Sierra Leone to share her love of geography and began teaching at her alma mater, Annie Walsh Memorial Secondary School. Eventually, she became head of the Geography Department at Fourah Bay College – University of Sierra Leone, and became warden of the Women’s Students program.

In 1986, Forde helped to carry out Sierra Leone's national population census. She also helped to popularize country's family planning program.

She was known for her support of the Hillside Day Care Centre, which was created in 1995 to care for orphans from civil war in Sierra Leone that caused the deaths of thousands of people there. That Centre became a preparatory school that taught more than 80 children, many of them civil war orphans.

Forde's brother, Winston Forde, dedicated his book The Story of Mining in Sierra Leone to his sister:

I write this book from the perspective of a geographer, and mainly for the benefit of our student minds. It seems appropriate, therefore, to dedicate it to my sister, the late Dr Enid Forde BA MA PhD, Professor in Geography and one of our eminent scholars of the period.
