= Thomas Sylvester Johnson =

Sierra Leonean Anglican bishop and theologian

Thomas Sylvester Johnson (1873 - 1955) was a Sierra Leonean Anglican bishop and theologian born in Freetown to a Krio farming and trading family of Liberated African stock.

Making the best of a village education, he taught in Freetown, where he gained a scholarship to Fourah Bay College and became headmaster of the Church Missionary Society (CMS) school. The difficulties of evangelism fueled his desire to improve his education so he took arts and theology degrees at Fourah Bay College. Rejected for the ministry, he returned to teaching but was eventually ordained as bishop's chaplain in 1909.

In 1911 he joined the staff of the Fourah Bay College, assisting in its financial rescue and increasing its impact (as a Christian institution with high academic standards) on local education. In 1933, after service as a diocesan inspector of schools and as a pastor, he became principal of the prestigious Church Missionary Society's Sierra Leone Grammar School, which had once refused him as a pupil. Thereafter, he was successively canon, archdeacon and, in 1937, first assistant bishop of Sierra Leone. He attended the Tambaram Missionary Conference of 1938 and in 1947, retired to his village, near Waterloo, remaining active in community affairs.

== Works ==
Johnson, while zealous for both education and evangelism, was innovative in giving Christian direction and interpretation of cultural practices. His book The Fear Fetish: Its Cause and Cure (1949) insists on taking African worldviews seriously. He also wrote a history of the Sierra Leonean church, The Story of a Mission (1953). His influence on Harry Sawyerr and others merits a place in the history of African theology.
