= George T.O. Robinson =

Sierra Leone activist (1922–2006)

George Theophilus Robinson (20 May 1922 – 7 February 2006) was a Creole civil servant and founder of the Creole Descendants Union (now the Krio Descendants Union or KDY), which was an offshoot of the Settlers Descendants Union.

== Family background ==
George Robinson was a half-brother of Ephraim Jonathan Robinson (1894–1986) and was a descendant of the Davis family of Sierra Leone, one of the founding Nova Scotian Settler families.
