= William Akabi-Davis =

Sierra Leonean sprinter (born 1962)

Personal information
- Nationality: Sierra Leonean
- Born: 3 August 1962 (age 63) Freetown, Sierra Leone

Sport
- Sport: Sprinting
- Event: 400 metres

William Michael Jeffrey Akabi-Davis (born 3 August 1962) is a Sierra Leonean sprinter. He competed in the men's 400 metres at the 1980 Summer Olympics.

From Freetown, Akabi-Davis attended Prince of Wales Secondary School and was a standout athlete growing up, competing in the 200m, 400m and 800m. He attended Fourah Bay College where he set multiple school running records. In 1980, he was selected to compete for Sierra Leone at the 1980 Summer Olympics and thus became the country's youngest-ever Olympian. After setting the national 400m record in 1981, he later retired and moved to the U.S., where he served in the United States Army and worked as a roadway engineer.
