= Modupe Jonah =

Sierra Leonean middle-distance runner

Personal information
- Nationality: Sierra Leonean
- Born: 12 April 1966 (age 60) Freetown, Sierra Leone

Sport
- Sport: Middle-distance running
- Event: 1500 metres

Daniel Modupe Josephus Jonah (born 12 April 1966) is a Sierra Leonean former middle-distance runner. He competed in the men's 1500 metres at the 1988 Summer Olympics.

Modupe was said to be a "major international talent" that was a household name in Sierra Leone for years. At the 1989 Peace and Friendship Cup athletics competition, Jonah won the bronze medal in the 3000 m steeplechase. His achievement was said to be a milestone in Sierra Leone distance running and evidence that Sierra Leonans could succeed in less conventional track events.

Jonah attended and ran in the NJCAA for Navarro College in Corsicana, Texas. He was active in the Texas road racing scene in the 1990s and won the 1990 Halloween Hustle 10K. At the 1990 All Saints Mile in Fort Worth, Texas, he hoped to run under four minutes but was thwarted by cold temperatures and high winds.
