= Dele Charley =

Raymond Caleb Ayodele Charley (27 March 1948, in Freetown – 8 May 1993, in Freetown) was a Sierra Leone Creole writer and playwright in English and Krio language.

He studied in Freetown and London and worked for the Ministry of Education.

He wrote the play called 'Blood Of A Stranger".

== Works ==
- Petikot Kohna, 1982
- Fatmata, 1983
