= Reginald Cline-Cole =

Sierra Leonean geographer (born 1956)

Reginald Akindele Cline-Cole (born September 1956 in Freetown, Sierra Leone) is a retired Senior Lecturer (equivalent to Associate Professor) and a scholar in Development Geography. Upon his formal retirement in May 2021, he was appointed as a Senior Honorary Research Fellow at the Centre of West African Studies, University of Birmingham—an acknowledgement of his extensive experience and expertise in African development.

== Life and study ==
Cline-Cole has done extensive work in the field of development issues in rural environments, as well as forestry and its human impact. He was one time head of the Centre of West African Studies, University of Birmingham (UK). He has previously taught at Bayero University, Nigeria, and Moi University, Kenya. Despite his retirement, he is still actively engaged in supervising postgraduate students (Masters and PhD).

== Selected publications ==
Cline-Cole's recent publications include:

- (with Yulong Ma, William A.Stubbings, Mohamed Abou-Elwafa Abdallah, Stuart Harrad) "Formal waste treatment facilities as a source of halogenated flame retardants and organophosphate esters to the environment: A critical review with particular focus on outdoor air and soil". Science of the Total Environment, Volume 807, Part 1, 10 February 2022, 150747.
- (with Yulong Ma, William A. Stubbings and Stuart Harrad) "Human exposure to halogenated and organophosphate flame retardants through informal e-waste handling activities - A critical review". Environmental Pollution, 115727, 2020.
- "Bouquets and brickbats along the road to development freedom and sovereignty: commentary on 'Rethinking the idea of independent development and self-reliance in Africa'". African Review of Economics and Finance, 12(1): 260–281, 2020.
- (ed. with Clare Madge) Contesting Forestry in West Africa (Aldershot: Ashgate Press, 2000),
- "Promoting (Anti-) Social Forestry in Northern Nigeria?" in Review of African Political Economy 24 (74), 1997,
- "Dryland Forestry. Manufacturing Forests and Farming Trees in Nigeria", in M. Leach and R. Mearns (eds), The Lie of the Land: Challenging Received Wisdom on the African Environment (James Currey and Heinemann, 1996).
