= Sam Franklyn Gibson =

Sierra Leonean politician (born 1952)

Franklyn Bode Gibson

Mayor of Freetown
- In office December 20, 2012 – May 11, 2018
- Preceded by: Gibril Kanu
- Succeeded by: Yvonne Aki-Sawyerr

Member of the Freetown City Council
- In office 2004–2012

Personal details
- Born: Sam Franklyn Gibson; 15 October 1952 (age 73) Freetown, British Sierra Leone
- Party: All People's Congress (APC)
- Education: Fourah Bay College
- Profession: Teacher

Sam Franklyn Gibson commonly known as Bode Gibson (born October 15, 1952) is a Sierra Leonean politician who served as Mayor of Freetown 2012 until 2018. He is a veteran politician and a prominent member of the ruling All People's Congress (APC).

Before he was elected as Mayor of Freetown, Bode Gibson served as an elected councillor in the Freetown City Council municipality, representing Wilberforce. He is a teacher by profession.

In the 2012 Local Councils elections, Bode Gibson was elected as Mayor of Freetown with 68.56% of the vote, defeating his main opponent Abraham Sesay-Jones of the Sierra Leone People's Party, who took 28.75%. He was sworn in as the Mayor of Freetown on December 20, 2012. His inauguration ceremony as Mayor of Freetown was attended by some senior Sierra Leonean politicians, including President Ernest Bai Koroma.
