= Gershon Collier =

Sierra Leonean diplomat (1927–1994)

Gershon Beresford Onesimus Collier

Sierra Leone's first permanent representative to the Headquarters of the United Nations of Sierra Leone to United Nations
- In office 1961 – February 17, 1967
- Succeeded by: Christopher Okoro Cole

Sierra Leonean Ambassador to the United States of Sierra Leone to United States
- In office November 20, 1963 – February 17, 1967
- Preceded by: Richard Edmund Kelfa-Caulker
- Succeeded by: Christopher Okoro Cole

Chief Justice of Sierra Leone
- In office February 17, 1967 – March 21, 1967
- Preceded by: Sir Samuel Bankole Jones
- Succeeded by: Banja Tejan-Sie

Personal details
- Born: February 16, 1927 Freetown, Sierra Leone
- Died: May 25, 1994 (aged 67) New York City, U.S.
- Spouse: Fashu Dora (m. 1954)
- Children: 2
- Parents: Samuel Adolphus Collier (father); Maria Jeanette Collier (mother)
- Education: CMS Grammar School and Fourah Bay College

Gershon Beresford Onesimus Collier (February 16, 1927 – May 25, 1994) was a Sierra Leone Creole diplomat, Chief Justice of Sierra Leone, and educator.

== Career ==
Collier was called to the English Bar in London.

When Albert Margai left the Sierra Leone People's Party in 1958, Collier went with him and became a member of the People's National Party's first executive committee where he served alongside other Sierra Leoneans such as Claude Nelson-Williams.

In 1961, he became Sierra Leone's first permanent representative to the United Nations.

In 1967, Margai arranged his nomination as Chief Justice of Sierra Leone. However, Margai lost the election in 1967 and Collier lost his office as Chief Justice.

In 1967, Collier immigrated to New York City, where he took a teaching appointment at New York University.

Collier's granddaughter Napheesa Collier won a gold medal in basketball at the 2020 Summer Olympics and 2024 Summer Olympics.
