= Freetown Secondary School for Girls =

School in Freetown, Sierra Leone

The Freetown Secondary School for Girls also known as FSSG or the Osora School is a secondary school established by Maise Osora and Hannah Benka-Coker in 1926 in Freetown, Sierra Leone.

== Sources ==
- https://www.oocities.org/thetropics/cabana/7690/freetown.html
