= Augustus Merriman-Labor =

Sierra Leonean barrister, writer and munitions worker (1877–1919)

Augustus Boyle Chamberlayne Merriman-Labor, who later took the name Ohlohr Maigi (28 November 1877 – 1919), was a Sierra Leonean barrister, writer and munitions worker. He is best known for his 1909 book Britons Through Negro Spectacles, an introduction to London that was "[p]art travelogue, part reverse ethnology, and part spoof of books by ill-informed 'Africa experts'".

== Life ==
Merriman-Labor was born in Freetown on 28 November 1877. A Sierra Leonean Creole, he was left in the care of his maternal grandfather John Merriman after his mother accepted a job as headmistress in the Gambia. He became a junior clerk in the office of the Colonial Secretary in Freetown. In 1898, he attracted literary attention with an anonymous essay on the Hut Tax War, The Last Military Expedition in Sierra Leone, which he arranged to be published in Liverpool. The pamphlet, claiming to be the work of an Englishman who had lived in Africa for twenty years, portrayed the colonial administration as ignorant and out-of-touch.

Merriman-Labor moved to London in 1904, aspiring to be the "Mark Twain of West Africa". He worked as a clerk, and taught Sunday School at Charles Spurgeon's Railway Orphanage in Stockwell. He entered Lincoln's Inn, but was excluded for setting up a commercial venture. He wrote on his disappointing experiences in Britain for the Sierra Leone Weekly News, before undertaking a 10,000-mile lecture tour across Africa entitled "Five Years with the White Man".

Merriman-Labor was finally called to the Bar in 1909. That year he also published Britons Through Negro Spectacles, in which the narrator spends a day accompanying a newly arrived African friend around London. His jokes at the expense of the British attracted condemnation, and the book's commercial failure pushed Merriman-Labor into bankruptcy. Shedding his Creole name, he took the name Ohlohr Maigi. Following overwork in a munitions factory, he died aged 42 in 1919.

== Works ==
- The last military expedition in Sierra Leone : or, British soldiers and West African native warriors. Manchester: John Heywood, [1898].
- A Funeral Oration delivered over the grave of the late Father John Merriman at the Kissy Road Cemetery in Freetown, Sierra Leone, on the evening of Sunday the 18th of February 1900. [1900]
- The Story of the African Slave Trade in a nutshell: being the substance of a paper read ... in Freetown, Sierra Leone, etc. Manchester: J. Heywood, [1900].
- An Epitome of a Series of Lectures on the Negro Race. Delivered during Eastertide, 1897, in the Baptist Chapel, at Rawdon Street, in Freetown, Sierra Leone. Manchester: J. Heywood, [1900].
- Handbook of Sierra Leone for 1901 and 1902. London: John Heywood, [1903].
- Handbook of Sierra Leone for 1904 and 1905. Manchester: Heywood.
- Britons through Negro spectacles, or, A Negro on Britons with a description of London. London: Imperial and Foreign Co., 1909.
