= Ernest Dunstan Morgan =

Sierra Leonean entrepreneur and philanthropist

Sir Ernest Dunstan Morgan
- Born: Ernest Dunstan Morgan; 17 November 1896; Freetown, Sierra Leone
- Died: 9 December 1979 (aged 83); Freetown, Sierra Leone
- Education: Zion Wilberforce Day School, Methodist Boys High School, British Colonial Hospital,
- Occupations: Entrepreneur, Philanthropist, Pharmacist
- Spouse: Lady Monica Morgan
- Writing career
- Language: English, Krio

Sir Ernest Dunstan Morgan, KBE (17 November 1896 – 9 December 1979) was a Sierra Leonean entrepreneur and philanthropist. He was awarded a Knighthood of the British Empire in 1971. Morgan was a member of the Creole ethnic group (descendant of freed slaves from Nova Scotia, United States and Great Britain landed in Freetown between 1792 and 1855).

Morgan traded in pharmaceuticals and general merchandise. He founded West End Pharmacy later renamed Morgan Pharmacy, which was one of the largest suppliers of pharmaceutical products in West Africa.

"When men achieve a certain stature they become institutions even during their lifetime. The name 'Morgan' without any prefix such as 'Mr,' 'Sir,' or 'Dr,' represents in Sierra Leone one revered institution, one very distinguished man. The late Queen of England honoured him with a Knighthood in the Most Excellent Order of the British Empire in 1971, but the people of Sierra Leone had already elevated him in their hearts to the peerage of 'Morgan'. (Excerpt from a speech delivered during an investiture ceremony).

== Early life ==
Ernest Dunstan Morgan was born in 1896 to Thomas William Morgan and Kezia Susan Barnett. Thomas William Morgan was in the printing trade and the accountant for a British trading company in Guinea. He was previously married to Nora Archer with whom he had seven children. Kezia Susan Barnett was a maroon descendent from Wellington Street in Freetown, Sierra Leone. Ernest Morgan spent a large part of his childhood with his grandmother Viola Peggy Nicol with whom he had a close relationship.

== Education ==
Ernest Morgan attended the Zion Wilberforce Day School until the age of 18. He then attended the Methodist Boys High School. Morgan trained as a nurse, dresser and dispenser under the British Colonial Medical System at the British Colonial Hospital. He also earned an honorary DCL (Doctorate of Civil Law).

== Career ==
Sir Ernest Dunstan Morgan was the first person to receive a druggist certificate in Sierra Leone. In addition to preparing and administering drugs, he performed a wide range of clinical services from treating minor tropical diseases and minor surgical procedures to delivering babies. Sir Ernest travelled extensively in the southern and eastern provinces of Sierra Leone. He went on to open a clinic in Blama. During his frequent trips to Freetown to procure medicines and supplies for the clinic in Blama, the demand for affordable good quality medicines became apparent. In 1921, he began trading in pharmaceuticals and general merchandise.

Morgan Pharmacy

Following the success of his practice in Blama, Sir Ernest moved back to Freetown in 1936 to establish the West End Pharmacy at 36 Krootown Road. He subsequently changed the name to Morgan Pharmacies for which he was the sole proprietor. Morgan Pharmacies registered as a limited company in 1962, with Sir Ernest as the principal shareholder. The company established its head office and main store beneath his residence at 64 Siaka Stevens Street (then Westmoreland Street) in Freetown. "Morgan", as it was fondly known locally, became the leading pharmaceutical business in Sierra Leone and went on to become one of the largest suppliers of pharmaceuticals in West Africa.

Philanthropic Work

Sir Ernest Dunstan Morgan was known for his social consciousness and philanthropy.

He was instrumental in founding the Sir Milton Margai School for the Blind in Sierra Leone. He believed in giving the visually impaired a chance at life's opportunities to realise their potential. Sir Ernest insisted the school be named after Sir Milton the first Prime Minister of Sierra Leone, instead of being named after him as was then advocated. Through his endeavours he served as the Chairman of the Blind Welfare Society.

An avid reader and consumer of global affairs, he was a proponent for education. Sir Ernest believed that sound education opened the door to opportunities and possibilities and provided an enabling environment for success and development.

He also funded scholarships for many Sierra Leoneans to study locally and abroad; and paid school fees for countless relatives and friends including education allowances for a few determined students from neighboring countries.

Sir Ernest's enthusiasm for education landed him as a prestigious member of the Fourah Bay College Council, amongst many other leadership roles and Chairmanships with various Organizations, including the then newly formed West African Examination Council. As a nominated member of the Legislative Council of Sierra Leone (the governing body during the Colonial era), Sir Ernest was a sound orator and proponent for positive change; changes which led to the evolution of the Legislative Council into the First Parliament of Sierra Leone, before independence. His work and significant contributions to the development of the country and the betterment of its citizens resulted in his often being selected to hold office by the Colonial Government.

On the international stage, Sir Ernest was the first representative of Sierra Leone to attend the International Labor Organization (ILO) conference in Geneva, Switzerland to discuss pioneering international labor standards.

Awards & Accolades

Morgan's philanthropic work earned him several accolades. He was including being named: Justice of the Peace, Member of the British Empire, and appointed as an officer of the Order of the British Empire. He was subsequently Knighted by Queen Elizabeth II in March 1971, with peerage as Knight Commander of the British Empire. Sir Ernest was a decorated Doctor of Civil Law (DCL) Honoris Causa by the University of Sierra Leone and was one of the first recipients of the Order of the Republic of Sierra Leone (ORSL) when Sierra Leone became a Republic.
