= Eustace Henry Taylor Cummings =

Sierra Leonean politician (1890–1967)

Eustace Henry Taylor Cummings CBE (1890 – 1967) qualified as a doctor at Liverpool University and then served as a medical officer in Sierra Leone. He served as Mayor of Freetown from 1948 to 1954. His father, Emmanuel Cummings, was also a mayor of Freetown.
