= John Ezzidio =

Sierra Leonean politician

John Ezzidio (c. 1810 – October 1872) was a freed slave of Nupe provenance who became a successful businessman and politician in Sierra Leone. Rescued from a slave ship headed for Brazil, he was apprenticed to a French shopkeeper and taught himself to read and write. Ezzidio eventually rose to the position of mayor of Freetown and later became a member of the colonial governor's Legislative Council.

== Kidnapping ==
Ezzidio, a Nupe was enslaved in the region of what is now modern-day Niger State, was kidnapped by slavers when he was young and brought to an area populated by the Yoruba. In 1827, he was sold to white slave traders, who put him on board a ship bound for Brazil. The ship was intercepted by the Royal Navy, and Ezzidio and the other 541 slaves who were still alive were landed in Freetown, Sierra Leone in October 1827.

== Business and political career ==
Ezzidio became the apprentice of a French shopkeeper named Beyaust; Beyaust named his apprentice "Isadore". The name was written down as "Ezzido", and eventually morphed into "Ezzidio". After the death of the Frenchman, Ezzidio was hired by an English firm. He managed a European-owned shop and then used the money he saved to start his own trading firm. He taught himself to read and write.

In 1841, Ezzidio purchased property for £100. He visited England the next year, making import deals with companies based there; by importing directly, he eliminated the need for middle men. Goods that were sent to his George Street property, at a total value of between £3000 and £4000 per year, included clothing such as suits and boots, foodstuffs such as ham, cookies, tea, and fortified wines (port and sherry).

In 1844, William Fergusson, Governor of Sierra Leone, appointed him to the position of alderman, and in 1845 Ezzidio became Mayor of Freetown.

In 1862, Governor Samuel Wensley Blackall split the Governor's Council into two parts, an Executive and a Legislative Council; the latter allowed representation from, among others, the colony's merchants. The Mercantile Association, in a vote consisting of twenty-four Africans, fourteen Europeans, and one Caribbean merchant, elected Ezzidio to represent them on this body. While on the council, he was noted for his fairness and unobtrusiveness.

Ezzidio described himself as an "oracle" of the people; some people, meanwhile, nicknamed him "dancing bear" due to his size and energy.

== Wesleyan Church involvement ==
Ezzidio joined the Wesleyan Church in 1835. He became a lay preacher in 1842 and also ran a Sunday school. He is recorded to have made the largest donation of all contributors at an 1864 church celebration.

In 1864, at Ezzidio's request, a white superintendent was sent from England to supervise the Wesleyan mission. This superintendent, Benjamin Tregaskis, was a Nonconformist, strongly sectarian, and opposed to the interdenominational cooperation Ezzidio and others in the church had previously supported. Trebaskis feuded with Ezzidio over church policy until the latter's death in October 1872.

== Honours ==
In 2007, in a campaign to Africanise British street names, the government of Freetown announced plans to rename Howe Street after Ezzidio.
