= A. B. C. Sibthorpe =

African historian

Aaron Belisarius Cosmo Sibthorpe (183?–1916) was a nineteenth century Sierra Leonean historian. He published both History and Geography of Sierra Leone in 1868.

Sibthorpe was born somewhere near Benin, and after being captured and enslaved, he became a Liberated African in colonial Sierra Leone while still a youth. He remained in Sierra Leone all his life. He became a school teacher, teaching in villages around Freetown.

He became a prominent member of the Creole community. However, by the time of his death he had been forgotten.
