= John Henry Malamah Thomas =

Sierra Leonean politician

John Henry Malamah Thomas (1844–1922) was a Sierra Leone Creole entrepreneur and a long serving mayor of Freetown, Sierra Leone.

== Life ==
John Henry Thomas was born in Hastings, a suburb of Freetown of Recaptive parents, and his father died when he was three years old. John Henry Malamah Thomas is an outstanding example of a self-made magnate. He promoted trade between Colony and "up-country", served as Mayor of Freetown eight times, and became an unofficial member of the Legislative Council in 1907.

Born at Hastings of Aku recaptive parents, his father died when he was three years old. Malamah Thomas started school in 1845, but the family's straitened circumstances made it necessary for him to spend the better part of his time helping his mother in her bid to make ends meet. At the age of fourteen, John left school and entered upon a business career. Starting as a clerk/trainee with a number of business concerns, he later set out on his own.

He started his business with a loan of £100 secured from a friend, Dr. Robert Smith. He built a factory on the Rokel River at a place called Malamah — that was how he came by the nickname "Malamah". Some years later, he closed his business on the Rokel and moved to the Scarcies where he worked as an agent of the Compagnie du Senegal (later Compagnie Francaise de L'Afrique Occidental, popularly known as CFAO). But before taking up his post on the Scarcies in 1882 he opened a small shop in Freetown under the management of his wife.

Six years later, Malamah Thomas resigned the CFAO agency and returned to Freetown to operate his business. Bringing his twenty-three years of commercial experience to bear upon the running of the business, it quickly expanded and prospered, and Thomas became one of the leading merchants in the city. He traded chiefly in cloth fabrics, and patented in England his own brand of cotton known as "Malamah baft". The beautiful "Malamah House" he built at East Street stands today as an eloquent monument of his commercial prowess and success.

Thomas also served both church and state. He was for thirteen years warden of Holy Trinity Church of which he later became Treasurer. In 1891, he was appointed Charity Commissioner, and became Commissioner of the Peace in 1894. In the Freetown municipal elections of 1903, he entered the City Council for the East Ward. In 1904, he was elected Mayor of Freetown, and held that position eight years.

When in 1907, he was appointed an unofficial member of the Legislative Council, members of the Hastings Re-Union Committee presented him with a Silver Cup in recognition of his "present position as a native merchant of sterling repute, a Justice of the Peace, thrice a City Magistrate, and now a member of the Legislative Council".

His political activities went beyond Sierra Leone. He became President of the local branch of the National Congress of British West Africa, a body formed in 1920, advocating united political agitation for self-government among the African peoples of British West Africa. He supported the Congress with both his money and time.

John Henry Malamah Thomas died in Freetown on January 18, 1922. He was deeply mourned, and the glowing tribute in the local "Sierra Leone Weekly News" was testimony to the contribution he made to the development of Sierra Leone.

please see [www.malamah.com]

== Sources ==
- A Short History at www.malamah.com
