= Samuel Lewis (barrister) =

Sierra Leonean lawyer and politician

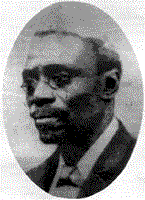
Sir Samuel Lewis, a founder of modern Sierra Leone

Sir Samuel Lewis KCMG (13 November 1843 – 9 July 1903) was a Sierra Leonean Creole mayor of Freetown and lawyer. Lewis was the first West African ever knighted and was the third Sierra Leonean to qualify as a barrister. Lewis was the first mayor of Freetown after the Freetown Municipal Council was established. In 1896, he was made a knight, the first West African to achieve such an honour, a year after he had been appointed mayor.

== Background ==
Lewis was one of nine children (eight sons and a daughter) of a Yoruba Recaptive merchant (in real estate and agricultural products) Elderman William Lewis of Oxford Street in the Freetown Municipal Council, and his wife Fanny. His siblings - Ebenezer Albert, Christopher Bright Lewis, William Jr, John, Josiah William, Emmanuel, Jacob and Caroline Matilda Lumpkin - were all political leaders and heads of the colonial government of Freetown. His parents were both liberated Africans from Egba in south western Nigeria. Lewis travelled to England by way of the relationship between his father William and the captain of a merchant ship that was shipping goods from Freetown to England. He is buried in Acton Cemetery in West London, England.

== Political career and legal luminary ==
Lewis went to England in 1866. He entered the Middle Temple, and then the chambers of Samuel Danks Waddy. He moved on to a chancery chambers, and was called to the bar in 1871. He returned to Freetown in 1872.

Lewis and other Eldermen who formed the Freetown Municipal Council were able to convince the Colonial Government with civil protest to relinquish power and the day-to-day running of the Municipal Council to Black Africans. In 1882, he was elected as a member to the American Philosophical Society.

== Sources ==
- J. D. Hargreaves, A Life of Sir Samuel Lewis. Oxford University Press, 1958. ISBN 0-19-724301-0
- Short biographies of Sierra Leonean 'heroes'
