= Winstanley Bankole Johnson =

Sierra Leonean politician

Winstanley Bankole Johnson is a Sierra Leonean politician who served as mayor of Freetown from July 2004 until he was ousted by the Freetown City Council on January 17, 2008, after several highly publicised controversies with the previous SLPP regime. Johnson was appointed mayor in July 2004 as a member of the opposition All People's Congress. Johnson came to power as the APC swept 2004 municipal elections.

== Controversies with the SLPP regime ==
=== Burial of Samuel Hinga Norman ===
Johnson denied Norman, a man indicted for war crimes by the Special Court for Sierra Leone, a civil burial service. He did this despite the fact that President Ahmed Tejan Kabbah said that Norman deserved such a burial because he had never been convicted of any charges, only accused. Johnson also upset fellow APC members of the city council, civil society activists and former Kamajor members, although the Norman family announced that they were "not bothered whether the Freetown City Council accords their late father a civic funeral, noting that it is left with the Bo City Council to decide". Norman was eventually laid to rest in Valunia Chiefdom, Bo District, Southern Province, Sierra Leone from where he hails. A statue was also erected near his burial site in Bo District, to honour his memory

=== Funding of Freetown cleaning operations ===
In October 2005, Johnson accused the SLPP government of not allocating enough funds to clean up the capital, Freetown. This was interpreted as an attack against the ruling party in the wake of the 2007 general elections.

=== Oswald Hanciles allegations ===
Oswald Hanciles, a fellow Creole and writer and commentator, levelled charges of defamatory libel against Johnson for his comments concerning the funding of Freetown's cleaning operations. The allegations of Hanciles were found to be groundless, politically motivated and were subsequently dismissed.

=== Street renaming project ===
In March 2007, Johnson and the city council were in discussions to rename various prominent streets in Freetown after some important African figures of the anti-slavery crusade. These people include: Olaudah Equiano, Thomas Peters (one of the founders of Freetown) and Sengbe Pieh (of The Amistad).

Equiano is a well-known historical figure of the anti-slavery campaign and both Pieh and Peters are national heroes. The former appears on one of the nation's banknotes while a statue of the latter already exists in Freetown.

The proposal by the mayor was never implemented as none of the historical figures in question, has a street named after him in the capital. Even President Ahmad Tejan Kabbah was opposed to any Sengbeh Pieh iconography in Freetown since his legacy was not directly connected to the city.

== Sources ==
- The Patriot Vandguard, concerning Oswald Hanciles
- "Sierra Leone opposition accuses govt of playing" 29 October 2005, VisitSierraLeone.org
- "As Hinga Norman’s Body Arrives... APC Councilors, Kamajors Blast Freetown Mayor!" 8 March 2007, Awareness Times
- "S Leone honours Africa slave campaigners", 20 March 2007, BBC News
