= Prince of Wales School (Freetown, Sierra Leone) =

Information
- School type: Secondary school
- Established: 1925; 101 years ago
- Gender: Boys

Prince of Wales School is an all-boys secondary school in Freetown, Sierra Leone . The school was established on April 6, 1925, with an emphasis on fostering science education and modern languages studies.

== School history ==
Prince of Wales School was inaugurated by His Royal Highness, the Prince of Wales, on April 6, 1925. It is one of Sierra Leone's top schools.

The Prince of Wales School was formally established in Freetown, Sierra Leone on April 6, 1925, with a purposeful insistence on fostering science education, and studies in modern languages. The school marked a turning point in secondary education in Sierra Leone, as its inception ushered the period in which the Sierra Leone government actively sought to control wasteful multiplication, religious bigotry, and denominational rivalry in secondary school.

Since its inauguration, the Prince of Wales School has provided secondary-level education in Sierra Leone with a focus on a broad and balanced curriculum. Its graduates have gone on to hold a range of positions in Sierra Leone and internationally.

The Prince of Wales Alumni Association-Georgia Branch was founded in 2002 by a cohort of former Students of the Prince of Wales Secondary School residing in the United States who not only saw the need for substantial financial, material and infra-structural support to their alma mater but also were prepared to make the necessary sacrifices destined to improve the quality of teaching and learning at the Prince of Wales School in Sierra Leone. Their patriotic zeal coupled with their conviction that they could make a difference in improving the human condition as well as positively influence posterity gave birth to the Prince Of Wales Alumni Association - Georgia Branch, U.S.A.

Notable Alumni include

Dr. David Sengeh, Chief Minister of Sierra Leone

Francis Nicol, Ph. D.

Francis Thompson, Esq

== School song ==
The school song was introduced by the late principal, William J. Davies, MBE in 1936

1. Come swell the chorus one and all and join the ranks with me;Prosperity to the Prince's boys upstanding three times three. Dear as of old and dear as now and despite any storm Long live for many a thousand years our Prince of Wales, Kingtom

CHORUS:

For searching Sierra Leone far and wide, no school can well be found; That sends forth truer gentlemen, or stands on firmer ground.(2X)

2. T'is not alone in science lore her manly sons excel; The cricket and the athletic grounds their tale of triumph tell. The Church, the State, the Camp and Bar, with varied voice attest, That whereso'er bright honour calls, her sons are with the best.

3. As on her walls we read the names renowned in former days, With beating hearts we vow to match their daring and their praise; For who would care through time to drift with dull and drowsy face, Unworthy of his faith and name, his father and his race.

4. Though scattered far we seldom meet the friends our boyhood knew, Old joys and griefs in memory dwell, toned down to sober hue, And as some well remembered name grows great, we glow with pride, To think that in our youthful days, we struggled at his side.

5. And when at last old age is ours and manhood's strength has fled, And young ambition's fire is cold and earthly hopes lie dead; We feel our boyhood's thrill once more and think its just life's morn, And keep a niche within our hearts for Prince of Wales, Kingtom.
