= Enid Jones-Boston =

Sierra Leonean beauty pageant contestant (born 1995)

- Born: Enid Jones-Boston; 17 October 1995 (age 30); Freetown; Sierra Leone
- Height: 1.67 m (5 ft 5 1/2 in)
- Beauty pageant titleholder
- Title: Miss Sierra Leone 2019
- Hair color: Black
- Eye color: Brown
- Major competitions: Miss University Africa 2017 (Unplaced); Miss Sierra Leone 2019 (Winner); Miss World 2019 (Unplaced)

Enid Jones-Boston (born 17 December 1995) is a Sierra Leonean model and beauty pageant titleholder who was crowned as the winner of the 2019 edition of the Miss Sierra Leone pageant.

== Early life and education ==
Born into a middle-class Creole family in Freetown, Sierra Leone; Jones-Boston attended Annie Walsh Memorial School and is an alumna of the Institute of Public Administration and Management, University of Sierra Leone.

== Pageantry ==
=== Miss University Africa 2017 ===
Jones-Boston contested at the 5th edition of the Miss University Africa held on 2 December 2017 at Obi Wali International Conference Center in Port Harcourt.

=== Miss Sierra Leone 2019 ===
Whilst representing Western Area Rural District, Jones-Boston was crowned winner of the 2019 edition of Miss Sierra Leone that was held on 22 September 2019 at the Bintumani Conference Centre in Freetown. This result qualified her to represent her country at the Miss World 2019 pageant held on 14 December at the ExCeL London, UK.

=== Miss World 2019 ===
She represented Sierra Leone at the Miss World 2019 pageant but failed to place.

Awards and achievements
Preceded by Sarah Laura Tucker	Miss Sierra Leone; 2019	Succeeded by TBC
