= Mariatu =

Mariatu is a female given name. Notable people with the name include:

- Mariatu Candé (born 1991), Bissau-Guinean footballer
- Mariatu Kamara (born 1986), Sierra Leonean writer
- Mariatu Kargbo (born 1985), Sierra Leonean beauty pageant contestant
- Mariatu Bala Usman, Nigerian health commissioner
