= Ibrahim Sannoh =

Sierra Leonean politician

Deputy Minister of Communication, Technology and Innovation, Republic Of Sierra Leone
- President: Julius Maada Bio
- Minister: Salima Monorma Bah

Personal details
- Born: Ibrahim Sannoh; 24 October 1987 (age 38)
- Party: Sierra Leone People's Party
- Education: Bo School

Ibrahim Sannoh is a Sierra Leonean politician who presently holds the position of Deputy Minister of Communication, Technology, and Innovation, having been appointed to this role by President Julius Maada Bio in the year 2023. Prior to this appointment, he occupied the position of executive director at the Sierra Leone Road Safety Authority

== Education ==
Sannoh's educational journey began at Saint Francis School in Sierra Leone where he obtained his primary education. He then continued his studies at Government Secondary School in Bo.

In 2006, Sannoh gained admission to Fourah Bay College, where he pursued a Bachelor's degree in Linguistics and Political Science.

After completing his undergraduate studies in 2010, Sannoh embarked on a Masters in Public Administration at the Institute Of Public Administration and Management, which he completed in 2019.

== Career ==
Sannoh's career commenced in 2018 when he assumed the role of Deputy Executive Director at the Sierra Leone Road Safety Authority (SLRSA). He became Executive Director of the authority in 2020 During his tenure, Sannoh brought about the complete automation of operational services for licenses, by launching the biometric driver's license in Sierra Leone, which remains in use to this day.

== Ministerial role ==
Sannoh was appointed Deputy Minister of Communication, Technology, and Innovation for the Republic of Sierra Leone in August 2023
