= Leeroy Wilfred Kabs-Kanu =

American journalist (born 1954)

Leeroy Wilfred Kabs Kanu
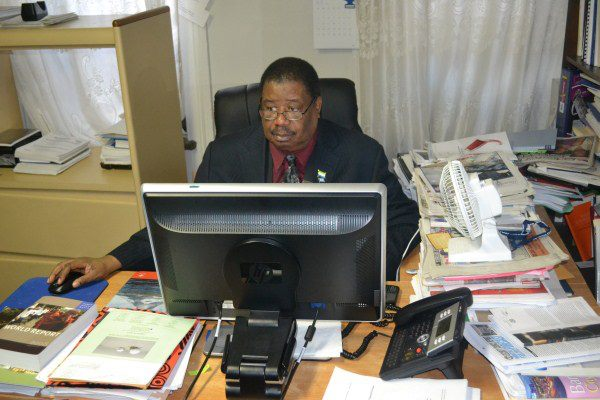

Minister Plenipotentiary of Sierra Leone
- In office 30 September 2009 – 4 April 2018

Personal details
- Born: 7 March 1954 (age 72) Freetown, British Sierra Leone
- Party: All People's Congress
- Spouse: Tigidankay B. Kanu (1978–present)
- Children: 5
- Education: Fourah Bay College, University of Phoenix, University of London
- Religion: Christianity (Protestant)
- Website: www.cocorioko.net

Leeroy Wilfred Kabs Kanu (born 7 March 1954), also known as Kabs Kanu or Kabs, is an American Christian Reverend, journalist, and newspaper publisher. He is a former high school English teacher, school principal, and lecturer of Educational Psychology. Between 2009 and 2018, he served as Minister Plenipotentiary at the Permanent Mission of Sierra Leone to the United Nations and Coordinator of the African Union Committee of 10. He worked under the presidency of former President Dr. Ernest Bai Koroma of Sierra Leone.

Kabs Kanu is also owner and the editor-in-chief of Cocorioko Newspaper, an American-based Sierra Leanean newspaper that is very supportive of the All People's Congress, Sierra Leone's main opposition party.

== Early life, family and education ==
Leeroy Wilfred Kabs Kanu was born in Freetown, Sierra Leone. His father was Pa Lamina Kanu of the Loko people from Gbendembu, Sierra Leone and his mother, Mammie Yaebu Kanu, also a Loko from the same Chiefdom, was a stay at home mom who raised seven children. He has celebrated 40 years of marriage with Tigidankay B. Kanu, a Director of nursing (long-term care facility), who is also a pastor and co-founder of Covenant Child World Ministry, their church in Somerset, New Jersey, the United States. They have four children together and Kabs Kanu also has a daughter from a previous relationship.

Kabs Kanu attended Christ the King College in Bo, Sierra Leone and graduated with a Bachelor of Arts degree in English, History, and Sociology at the University of Sierra Leone. He also holds a master's degree in Educational psychology, Special Education, a Theology degree from "Life Bible School" in Kakata, Liberia and he read law at the University of London. He also took a Clinical Pastoral Training course at the Robert Wood Johnson University Hospital's Pastoral Education Department where he qualified as a Clinical Pastor who ministers to and counsels patients. He served as "CPE Chaplain" in the hospital for two years, under the directorship of the late Dr. John De Velder.

== Career ==
University of Sierra Leone alumni students including Ernest Bai Koroma had acknowledged that Cocorioko Newspaper was first published in 1973 when Kabs Kanu was a student at the University. Some Sierra Leonean newspaper publishers had also said that the first newspaper started with a revolutionary students' union government which was led by one Boubacar Njai-Bahled, an influential student at the campus. Others have affirmed that Kabs was the Minister of Propaganda in that student's government. To them, Ccocorioko Newspaper was the voice of that students' union when they were involved in what they described as a "battle of wits and supremacy with the college administration and political powers in the country."

Students from the 1973 to 1977 alumni had stated that Cocorioko's editor in chief was Ben Ikeakor, a Nigerian student. They have said that the newspaper's editorial board members were Florence Iscandri, Millicent Macauley, Mohamed Lamin, Anthony Brewah, Princetta Godwin, Joan Mundoma, and Jaiah Kallon, who were student activists. The paper was said to cover the entertainment news on campus as well as their goals and aspirations. They claim that the student government aimed to effect change in the welfare of students on the campus.

Many believe that it was that student government that "set the stage for the student revolution in 1977 headed by Hindolo Trye and that the massive students' action against the lethargic political powers forced the government to make wholesale reforms in governance which led to a snap General Elections that brought intellectuals into the national government for the first time." In an "About Cocorioke" article Kabs stated that the paper folded up in 1976 when the main publishers graduated from college. It attests that the newspaper was influential on the college campus, attracting the attention of senior government officials and the media of Sierra Leone. However, upon graduating, Kabs Kanu discontinued the paper.

Kabs Kanu became a High School teacher and a school principal at the United Muslim Association Secondary School in Freetown, Sierra Leone. He was also a teacher at "Technical School" at Congo Cross, Freetown and wrote for THE TABLET Newspaper, an established publication in the country at that time.

There is a timeline that indicates that Leeroy Wilfred Kabs Kanu relocated to Monrovia, Liberia in the late 1970s. In Liberia, he served as Curriculum Specialist at the Ministry of Education in Liberia and taught at the "Monrovia Central High School" through to the mid 1980s. Kabs Kanu was also a Sports Correspondent for WE YONE Newspaper (another prominent publication at that time) and continued to write for THE TABLET Newspaper. Kabs became a columnist for Liberian newspapers such as, "Daily Observer" and "The New Liberian." The timeline states that from 1985 to 1990 he lectured at Kakata Rural Teacher Training Institute (K.R.T.T.I.) which was a University of Liberia /World Bank sponsored teacher training program in Kakata, Liberia. His field was Educational Psychology.

While living in Kakata, he became a born-again Christian and enrolled at the "Life Bible School" where he studied Theology and was ordained a Reverend. In 1988, Rev. Leeroy Wilfred Kabs-Kanu suffered from severe shortness of breath and myocardial infarction. He traveled to the United States seeking an urgent life-saving treatment of the condition joining his elder brother Togbangay Max Kanu, a well-known former radio Producer from the Sierra Leone Broadcasting Station. In the United States, he received treatment for his illness but doctors also warned him not to return to Africa or his condition may become critical once more.

"He has practiced journalism since his teen days at Christ The King's College (CKC), Bo and was very active in journalism at Fourah Bay College where he edited COCORIOKO and SPOTLIGHT between 1972 and 1975 and also served as the Public Relations Officer of the students’ Union government between 1974 and 1975.

After graduating from college, Kabs worked for THE TABLET newspaper in Freetown in 1977 -1978, before leaving for Liberia where he was Sports Correspondent for WE YONE and continued to work for THE TABLET. He also contributed articles to the Liberian newspapers, DAILY OBSERVER and THE NEW LIBERIAN."

– The Patriot Vanguard

== Cocorioko Newspaper, 2002–2007 ==
Between 1990 and 1995, Kabs Kanu took the Clinical Pastoral Training course at the Robert Wood Johnson University Hospital's Pastoral Education Department where he qualified as a clinical pastor who ministers to and counsels patients. He then served as "CPE Chaplain" at the hospital, for two years, under the directorship of the late Dr. John De Velder. He was featured editor of "The West African Journal" between 1995 and 1998 and "Expo Times" between 2000 and 2003.

Kabs Kanu studied at the University of Phoenix (Jersey City campus) for his Master of Arts degree in Special Education. He was a Special Education teacher at the Franklin Township Board of Education, serving the Franklin Middle School and the Franklin High School by teaching students with learning, emotional and behavioral challenges. He revived his newspaper from college, (Cocorioko Newspaper) in 2002 in conjunction with his job as a teacher in Somerset, New Jersey. According to AllAfrica.com, Kabs Kanu resumed publishing his newspaper online at "Leonenet – UMBC," which was the first Sierra Leone discussion forum set up at the advent of the internet, by Claude Meama- Kajue. The Cocorioko newspaper quickly became a hot item with Sierra Leonean news readers and the Sierra Leone International Travel Guide, published by American researchers Katrina Manson and James Wright, while discussing the media scene in Sierra Leone, described Cocorioko as "The real online highlight" (See Page 121 ).

When Kabs Kanu revived in the early 2000s, the newspaper was called Daily News Inquirer. The Reverend later changed the paper's name to Cocorioko Newspaper, the name of the first newspaper he published as a student at the University of Sierra Leone, where the newspaper was a hit among students. He got an award for good work as a student journalist from the Fourah Bay College Students Union. In 2015 he stated that the "present mission of the newspaper is the rebranding of Sierra Leone." Today, Cocorioko is one of Sierra Leone's hardest-hitting opposition newspapers.

== Cocorioko Newspaper, 2007–2018 ==
Some Sierra Leoneans believe that the diligent reporting on Cocorioko Newspaper contributed to the regime change that took place during Sierra Leone's 2007 General Elections. Others gather that an overwhelming number of people voted for Dr. Ernest Bai Koroma and his All People's Congress Party (A. P. C.) during the democratic Presidential and Legislative Elections since they believed Cocorioko Newspaper's widely broadcast reports that the Sierra Leone People's Party (S. L. P. P.) government of the late President HE Dr. Ahmed Tejan Kabbah was inefficient and corrupt.

== Minister Plenipotentiary to the Permanent Mission of Sierra Leone at the United Nations ==
In 2009, the President of Sierra Leone, HE Dr. Ernest Bai Koroma appointed Rev. Leeroy Wilfred Kabs-Kanu as his Minister Plenipotentiary to the Permanent Mission of Sierra Leone at the United Nations in New York City. He also appointed him as the Coordinator of the Africa Union Committee of 10. Kabs Kanu received his appointment letter from Sierra Leone Foreign Ministry, in Freetown, Sierra Leone. In his new capacity as Minister Plenipotentiary, he inherited some socio-economic and political problems and worked diligently to change those conditions. He represented President Ernest Koroma in the UN Security Council and co-chaired the African Union Committee of 10 (C-10), which has the primary responsibility to canvass support for the African Common Position, as encapsulated in the Elzuwini Consensus and the Sirte Declaration.

" Sierra Leone's Minister Plenipotentiary to the United Nations, Mr. Leeroy Wilfred Kabs-Kanu, has called for the creation of an African -based media system like the Arab media network, Al Jazeera, to accurately tell the African story. The minister was addressing the Africa@50 Summit at the African Union, UN Permanent Observer Mission Headquarters in New York yesterday. (Photo: Minister Leeroy Kabs-Kanu addressing Center for Media and Peace Initiative Summit in New York)

The Conference, which was attended by ambassadors and diplomats assigned to the UN, as well as journalists and policymakers from Africa, was organized by the New York-based Center For Media and Peace Initiatives to mark the 50th Anniversary of the African Union (AU) which started as the Organization of African Unity (OAU)."

– Sierra Express Media

He engaged with the national and global Press, public affairs, departments of Commerce, and Tourism to rebrand Sierra Leone's globally tarnished image after the end of the Sierra Leone Civil War. His mandate was a new All People's Congress government initiative that was designed to change the international perception and image of not only the people of Sierra Leone but Sierra Leone itself which at the time was best known for civil war, genocide and conflict diamonds. He also facilitated President Koroma's other initiatives, such as "Uniting the Diaspora," "the Open Government principle," and "Attitudinal Changes programs."

In the C-10 Program at the UN, Rev. Kabs-Kanu worked directly with Sierra Leone's Permanent Representative to the United Nations, HE Shekou Touray, who led the committee. As the African leaders had elected President Ernest Koroma as Chairman of the AU Committee of 10, the C10 was the African Union's Committee of Ten Heads of States responsible for articulating the common African position on the reform of the Security Council at the United Nations. Their mandate was to get two permanent and three non-permanent seats for Africa in the Security Council and veto powers in the August council.
