= St. Joseph's Secondary School (Sierra Leone) =

School in Freetown, Sierra Leone

St. Joseph's Secondary School, also known as Saint Joseph's Convent School or as Convent School, is a Catholic secondary school in Freetown, Sierra Leone, established in 1868. It is affiliated to Saint Joseph's Primary School (Sierra Leone) and to St. Edward's Primary School and St. Edward's Secondary School, all also in Freetown.

== Notable alumni ==
- Bertha Conton
- Florence Dillsworth
- Yvonne Aki-Sawyerr
- Tyrilla Gouldson
- Neyorlyn Williams
- Patricia Kabbah

== Sources ==
- St Joseph's Secondary School Home page.
- St Joseph's Ex-Pupils Association
- "Sierra Leone: St. Joseph's Convent Principal 'Begs'". Via AllAfrica, 2 October 2006.
