= Wellbody Alliance =

Sierra Leonean non-profit organization

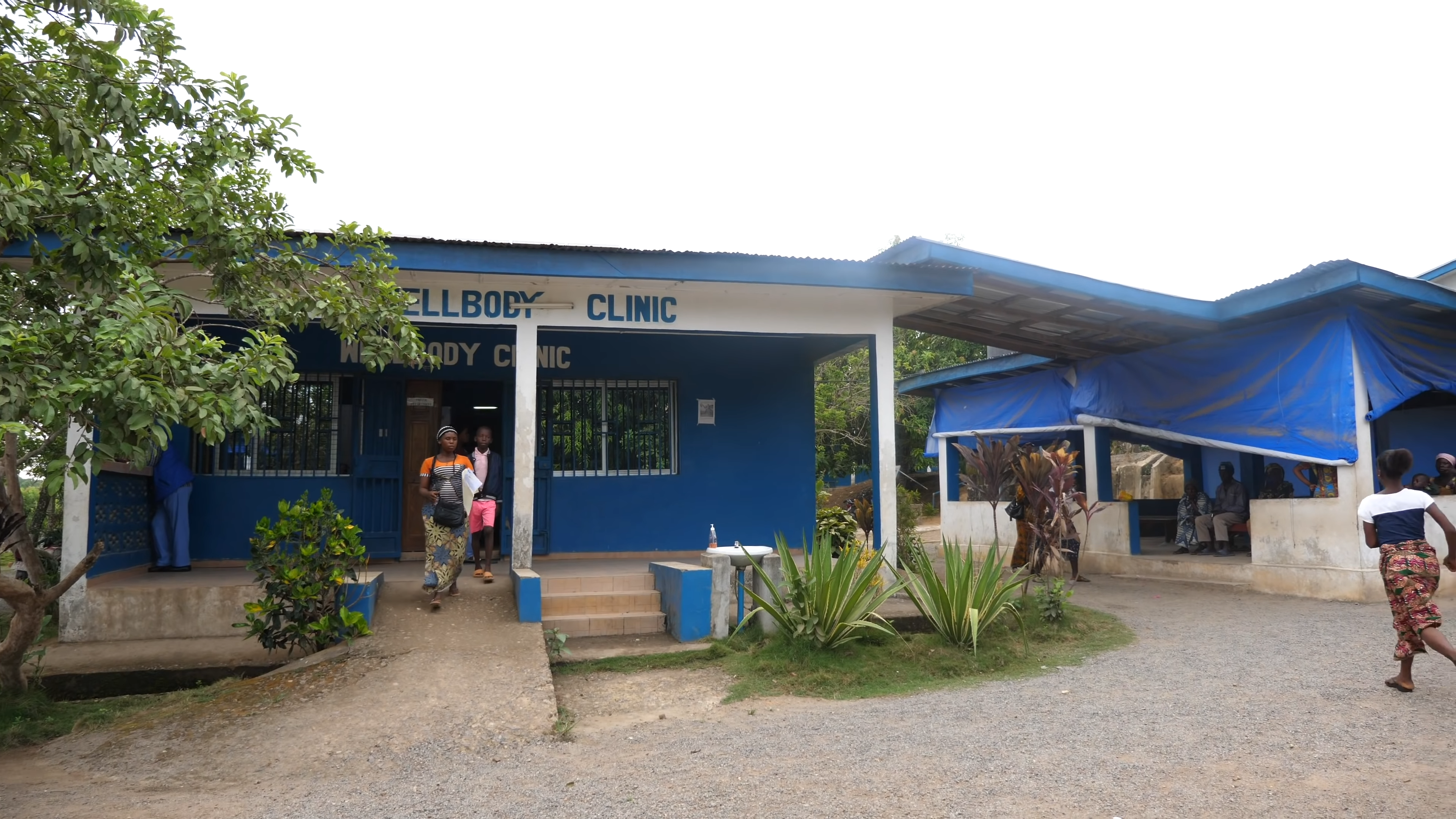
- Wellbody Clinic in Koidu in 2020
- Founded: September 2006; 19 years ago
- Location(s): Kono District, Sierra Leone, and Boston, Massachusetts, U.S.
- Website: www.wellbodyalliance.org

Wellbody Alliance is a 501(c)(3) registered nonprofit organization working to provide healthcare as a human right in Kono District, Sierra Leone. In addition to running a primary care facility, Wellbody operates a women's center and will open a birth center in 2015. They also focus on the prevention and treatment of HIV/AIDS and tuberculosis and provide medical services to amputee victims from the 11-year Sierra Leone Civil War. Their response effort during the Ebola virus epidemic in West Africa has received widespread media attention. These efforts include supporting four treatment facilities in rural Kono, house-to-house contract tracing and surveillance, the large-scale distribution of protective gear throughout Sierra Leone and an emphasis on sensitive community engagement to help stop the spread of the virus.

== History ==
Wellbody Alliance was founded in 2006 by Bailor Barrie, a recent graduate of The University of Sierra Leone's medical school in Freetown, Dan Kelly, a medical student from Albert Einstein College of Medicine, Kathy Kelly, and Yachtz Radcliff. The group formed Wellbody, then called Global Action Foundation, and served communities out of a mobile clinic. At the time, their focus was providing amputee victims with high quality, accessible healthcare.

In 2008, the two founded a clinic in Kono District, where four doctors serve a population of 400,000, 1 in 23 women dies during childbirth and 1 in 5 children dies before age 5.

== Services ==
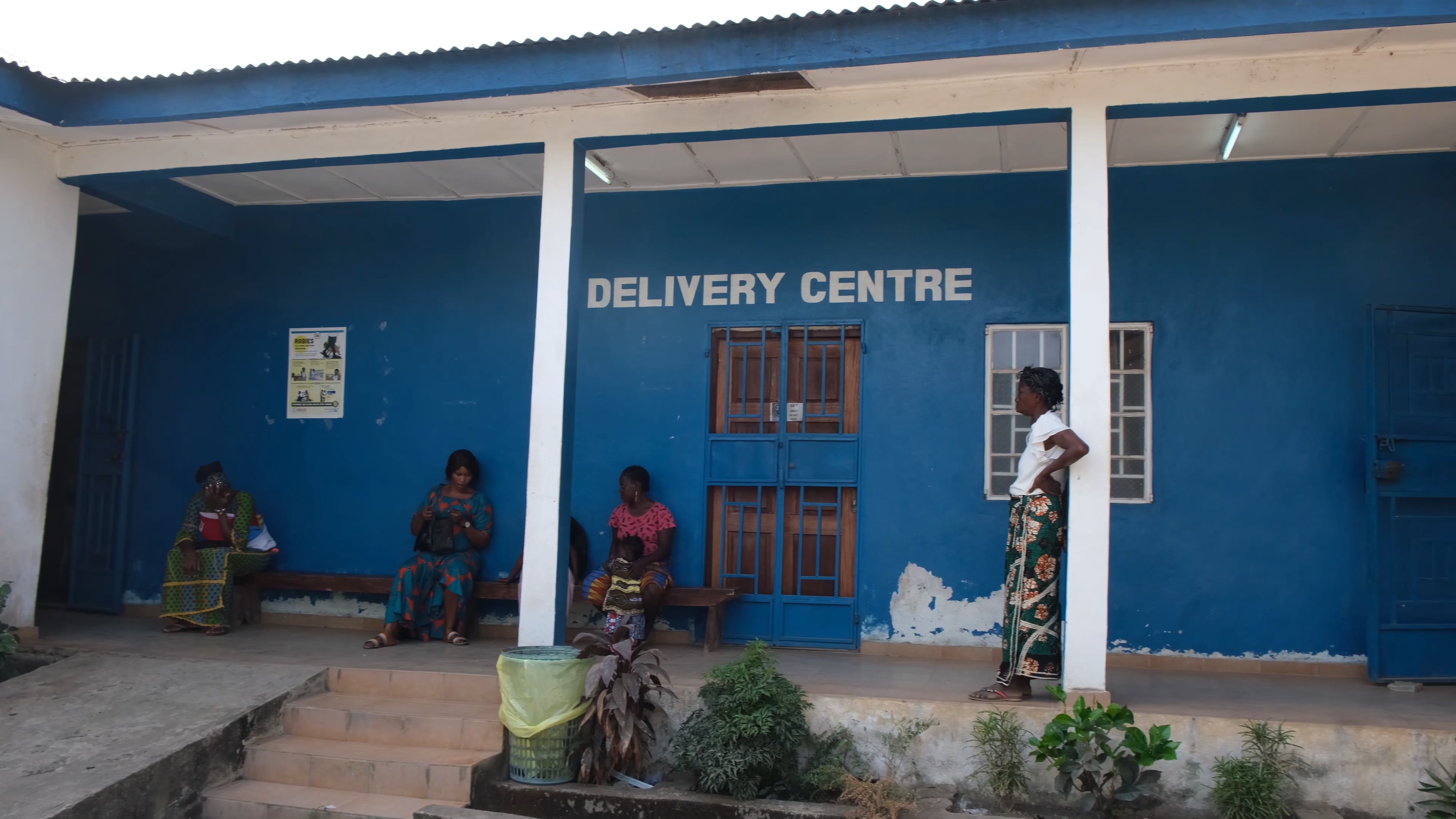
Maternity ward in Koidu

Wellbody has since expanded its services, operating a primary care facility and a women's center. They were scheduled to open a birth center at the same site in 2015. Through clinical and community-based programs, the organization provides an estimated 30,000 people with healthcare, with over 70% receiving these services free of charge.

== Approach ==
Wellbody places an emphasis on community-based healthcare. In addition to consulting and treating patients at their clinic, their community health workers provide medical services in remote villages, making home visits throughout Kono District. They provide home-based care for those with chronic conditions and accompany other patients to the appropriate healthcare facilities.

== Partners ==
Wellbody currently partners with Sierra Leone's National Leprosy and Tuberculosis Control Programme, National AIDS Secretariat, EcoMed laboratory, Koidu Government Hospital, Kono District's Health Management Team and Kono's Amputees and War Wounded Association. International partners include the World Health Organization, the Norwegian Refugee Council and Partners In Health.

== Response to the 2014–2015 Ebola virus epidemic ==
Wellbody's role as a primary healthcare provider in Kono District placed them in a position of leadership during the Ebola virus epidemic in West Africa. In addition to being the only primary care clinic that has remained open throughout the entire outbreak in Eastern Sierra Leone, they were supporting four treatment facilities in remote parts of Kono, conducting house-to-house contact tracing and surveillance and, staying rooted in their community-based approach, advocating for sensitive and communicative community engagement in order to stop the spread of the virus. They have also distributed protective gear and medicine throughout Sierra Leone. Their efforts have been covered widely in the media, including in The Atlantic, the Huffington Post, the New York Times and ABC News.
