= Sulaiman Baba Timbo =

Sulaiman Baba Timbo (born 1938 in Rokulan, Sanda Tendaren, Bombali District, Sierra Leone) is a former student of 'The Bo School', a graduate of Durham University (currently Fourah Bay College, University of Sierra Leone) and a former student union Leader. Timbo speaks French, English, Krio, Themne and Fula. He has served in various capacities in the Foreign Ministry in Sierra Leone and worked with UNESCO in Paris, Dakar and Nairobi. He was Sierra Leone's first Ambassador to Saudi Arabia and the Gulf states, and later Ambassador plenipotentiary to the BENELUX countries, France and the European Union. He is married with children and is retired.
