= Tyrilla Gouldson =

Sierra Leonean beauty pageant contestant

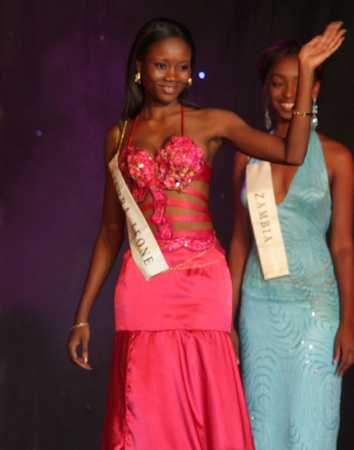
- Born: Tyrilla Gouldson; 1984 (age 41–42); Freetown; Sierra Leone
- Height: 1.75 m (5 ft 9 in)
- Beauty pageant titleholder
- Title: Miss Sierra Leone 2008
- Hair color: Black
- Eye color: Brown
- Major competitions: Miss Sierra Leone 2008 (Winner); Miss World 2008 (Unplaced)

Tyrilla Gouldson (born 1984) is a Sierra Leonean model and beauty pageant titleholder who was crowned as the winner of the 2008 edition of the Miss Sierra Leone pageant.

== Early life and education ==
Born in Freetown, Sierra Leone, into a Creole family, Gouldson attended St. Joseph's Convent School and is an alumna of the Institute of Public Administration and Management, University of Sierra Leone. She has a diploma in Local Government Administration and a certificate in Accounting.

== Pageantry ==
=== Miss Sierra Leone 2008 ===
Whilst representing Western Area Urban District, Gouldson was crowned winner of the 2008 edition of Miss Sierra Leone that was held on 20 June at the Family Kingdom Entertainment Complex in Freetown. This result qualified her to represent her country at the Miss World 2008 pageant held on 13 December at the Sandton Convention Centre in Johannesburg, South Africa.

=== Miss World 2008 ===
She represented Sierra Leone at the Miss World 2008 pageant but failed to place.

Awards and achievements
Preceded by Fatmata Turay	Miss Sierra Leone; 2008	Succeeded by Mariatu Kargbo
