= Aminata Adialin Bangura =

Sierra Leonean beauty pageant contestant

Aminata Bangura
- Born: Aminata Adialin Bangura; 1994 (age 31–32); Port Loko District; Sierra Leone
- Height: 1.80 m (5 ft 11 in)
- Beauty pageant titleholder
- Title: Miss Sierra Leone 2016
- Hair color: Black
- Eye color: Brown
- Major competitions: Miss Sierra Leone 2016 (Winner); Miss World 2016 (Unplaced)

Aminata Adialin Bangura (born 1994) is a Sierra Leonean model and beauty pageant titleholder who was crowned as the winner of the 2016 edition of the Miss Sierra Leone pageant.

== Early life and education ==
Born in Port Loko District, Sierra Leone, Bangura studied sociology at the University of Sierra Leone.

== Pageantry ==
=== Miss Sierra Leone 2016 ===
Whilst representing Port Loko District, Bangura was crowned winner of the 2016 edition of Miss Sierra Leone pageant that was held on 21 May at the Bintumani Conference Centre in Freetown. This result qualified her to represent her country at the Miss World 2016 pageant held on December 18 at the MGM National Harbor, Oxon Hill, Maryland, United States.

=== Miss World 2019 ===
She represented Sierra Leone at the Miss World 2016 pageant but failed to place.

Awards and achievements
Preceded by Margaret Murray	Miss Sierra Leone; 2016	Succeeded by Sarah Laura Tucker
