= Henry M. Joko-Smart =

Sierra Leonean law professor and educator

Supreme Court Justice

Personal details
- Born: 4 June 1933 Bonthe, Sierra Leone
- Died: 21 July 2024 (aged 91) Freetown, Sierra Leone
- Party: Independent

Henry M. Joko-Smart (4 June 1933 – 21 July 2024) was a Sierra Leonean law professor, educator and Supreme Court justice.

== Early life ==
Joko-Smart was born in Bonthe, British Sierra Leone on 4 June 1933. He attended St. Edward's Secondary School in Freetown and Fourah Bay College. He obtained a B.A. in classics and a diploma in education from the University of Durham, UK, LL.B. (first class honours) and LL.M. from the University of Sheffield, UK, and a Ph.D. in law from the Law School at the School of Oriental and African Studies, University of London. He was called to the bar at Gray's Inn in London in 1965.

== Career ==
Joko-Smart had a lucrative practice in Freetown in the 1960s. From 1966 to 2000, he was a lecturer, senior lecturer, professor of law, and dean of the faculty of law of Fourah Bay College, a constituent college of the University of Sierra Leone. From 1998 to 2005, he served as a justice of the Supreme Court of Sierra Leone.

Joko-Smart was the chairman of the Sierra Leone Anti-corruption Commission between 2006 and 2007, replacing Val Collier.

Joko-Smart also served the United Nations in several capacities, including as chairman of the 21st and 35th sessions of the United Nations Commission on International Trade Law (in 1988 and 2002, respectively), and a member of the panel of arbitrators of the International Centre for the Settlement of Investment Disputes in Geneva, Switzerland.

== Personal life and death ==
Joko-Smart died in Freetown, Sierra Leone on 21 July 2024, at the age of 91.
