= William Conton =

Sierra Leonean academic and writer

William Farquhar Conton
- Born: 5 September 1925; Bathurst, Gambia
- Died: 23 June 2003 (aged 77); Freetown, Sierra Leone
- Education: Durham University (BA, St John's College)
- Occupations: Educationalist; historian; author; writer
- Spouse: Bertha Yvonne Conton, née Thompson
- Children: 5
- Relatives: Dr Raymond Sarif Easmon (brother-in-law), Amy Manto Bondfield Wellesley-Cole, née Hotobah-During (sister-in-law)

William Farquhar Conton (5 September 1925 – 23 June 2003) was a Sierra Leone Creole educator, historian and acclaimed novelist.

== Background and early life ==
William Farquhar Conton was born on 5 September 1925 in Bathurst, Gambia, to the union of Cecil Conton (1885–1926) and Olive Conton, née Farquhar. The Contons and Farquhars were first-generation Sierra Leone Creoles of Caribbean origin who settled in Sierra Leone during the late nineteenth century. Cecil Barger Conton had been born in Bermuda to William A. Conton (born 1837) and Elizabeth Conton (born 1857). Olive Farquhar was the daughter of Archdeacon Charles William Farquhar (died 1928) of Barbados, a missionary in French Guinea.

== Education ==
William Conton was educated at CMS Grammar School in Sierra Leone before proceeding to Durham University in England, where he read for a Bachelor of Arts degree in History, graduating in 1947 as a member of St John's College. Conton also served in the Officer Training Corps during the Second World War.

== Career ==
After graduating in 1947, he taught at Fourah Bay College for the next six years, moving on to become principal of Accra High School in Ghana. Returning to Sierra Leone, he was principal of two high schools, before rising to be chief education officer in Sierra Leone. He subsequently worked for UNESCO in Paris.

=== Writing ===
In 1960, Conton's novel The African was the twelfth book published in the important Heinemann's African Writers Series. Partly autobiographical, it revolves around an African student in England from the fictional nation of Songhai, his romance with a white South African woman that ends tragically, and his political determination to bring down the apartheid system in South Africa. Although The African had widespread acclaim, critics such as Wole Soyinka were unimpressed with the novel and found the romantic aspects unconvincing, which he referred to as utopian "love optimism", and called the main character, Kamara, an "unbelievable prig".

In 1961, Conton published his two-volume work entitled West Africa in History, which covered various aspects of West African history and combined his interests and experience as a historian with his literary flair.

In 1987, Conton published The Flights, which is in some respects a sequel to The African, and depicts Saidu, a political exile in England from the same fictional West African country of Songhai, who under psychological stress resorts to hijacking a commercial airliner to force the Songhai government to accede to his demands. Described by literature scholar Oyekan Owomoyela in The Columbia Guide to West African Literature in English since 1945 as "Badly written and badly printed", the book has attracted little attention.

== Personal life ==
In 1949, William Conton married Bertha Yvonne Thompson, an educator, principal, and school proprietress, and the couple had five children.

== Later years ==
William Conton died in Freetown, Sierra Leone, in July 2003.

== Works ==
- The African, 1960. Republished in the Heinemann African Writers Series, 1964.
- West Africa in History, 1961
- The Flights, 1987
