= Heiser =

Heiser is a surname. Notable people with the surname include:

- Charles Bixler Heiser (1920–2010), American botanist
- Francis Heiser (died 1952), British priest
- Gernot Heiser (born 1957), Australian professor
- Joseph M. Heiser Jr., American general
- Michael S. Heiser, American scholar and author
- Rolland V. Heiser, American general
- Roy Heiser (born 1942), American baseball player
- Willem Heiser (born 1949), Dutch social scientist
