= Muhammed Jah =

Gambian entrepreneur and businessman

Muhammed Jah is a Gambian entrepreneur and businessman who is best known for being founder and CEO of QuantumNet Group, one of the larger technology corporations in Gambia. As of June 2012, the corporation was worth around US$156 million. He has been named "Gambian Businessman of the Year" 3 times.

== Early life and education ==
Jah studied Islamic studies in Saudi Arabia. After encountering the computer industry in the early 90s, he studied Electronics and Communications at the University of Sierra Leone.

== Business ==
He founded QuantemNet Group, as a computer training center on a $16,000 loan from an uncle to buy computers and other equipment. The center was renamed the QuantumNet Institute of Technology in 2006. The firm grew to sell equipment and as a distributor to international technology companies.

He grew the business investing in QCell the first 3g company in The Gambia.

== Personal life ==
Jah was stranded with his wife, Neneh Secka, and three kids in the United States due to the COVID-19 pandemic.

Jah's brother is Doctor Abubacarr Jah.
