= Miss Sierra Leone =

Beauty pageant

Miss Sierra Leone Ltd.
- Formation: 1986; 40 years ago
- Type: Beauty pageant
- Headquarters: Freetown
- Location: Sierra Leone
- Members: Miss World
- Official language: English

Miss Sierra Leone is a national Beauty pageant in Sierra Leone. The pageant constantly recruits the official winner to Miss World. In under Miss Sierra Leone Ltd. the pageant is sponsored by the government of Sierra Leone in Freetown.

== International winners ==
- Miss Africa:
  - 1990 - Sia Matturi

== Titleholders ==
- : Declared as Winner
- : Ended as runner-up or top 5/6 qualification
- : Ended as one of the finalists or semifinalists
- : Ended as special awards winner

The Winner of Miss Sierra Leone represents her country at Miss World pageant. On occasion, when the winner does not qualify (due to age) for either contest, a runner-up is sent. In 1986, Alice Matta Fefegula was the first Miss World contestant to represent Sierra Leone. In 1990, Sia Matturi became the first University student to win the title, and though she did not compete that year in Miss World, she became the first titleholder to win an international title by winning Miss Africa 1990 in Banjul, The Gambia.

Year	Miss Sierra Leone	Placement at Miss World	Special Awards
2026	Mariyam Konneh	TBA	TBA
2025	Lachaeveh Davis	Unplaced	
2023	Daisy Princess Mujeh Abdulai	Unplaced	
Did not compete since 2020—2022
2019	Enid Jones-Boston	Unplaced	Miss World Sport (Top 32)
2018	Sarah Laura Tucker	Unplaced	Miss World Sport (Top 24)
2017	Did not compete		
2016	Aminata Adialin Bangura	Unplaced	Beauty with a Purpose (Top 24)
2015	Did not compete		
2014	Margaret Murray	Did not compete	
2013	Did not compete		
2012	Vanessa Williams	Unplaced	
2011	Natasha Beckley	Unplaced	
2010	Neyorlyn Williams	Unplaced	
2009	Mariatu Kargbo	Top 16	Miss World Talent
2008	Tyrilla Gouldson	Unplaced	
2007	Fatmata Turay	Unplaced	
Did not compete between 1991—2006
1990	Sia Matturi	Unplaced	
1989	Did not compete		
1988	Twilla Ojukutu-Macauley	Unplaced	
1987	Did not compete		
1986	Alice Matta Fefegula	Unplaced	
