= AWWA =

AWWA is an acronym that can have several meanings,

- American Water Works Association
- Amputees and War Wounded Association
