= Abu Bakarr Kanu =

Sierra Leonean chemist

- Education: University of Manchester; University of Sierra Leone
- Scientific career
- Workplaces: Washington State University; Winston-Salem State University
- Thesis: Environmental quality assurance monitoring with membrane inlet differential mobility spectrometry (2003)

Abu Bakarr Kanu is a Sierra Leonean analytical chemist who is a professor at Winston-Salem State University. His research considers separation-type instrumentation for the rapid analysis of chemical and biological compounds. Kanu is also involved with education and outreach programmes, and works to bring hands-on chemistry lessons to young people in Sierra Leone.

== Early life and education ==
Kanu was the first member of his family to attend university. He attended University of Sierra Leone, where he studied chemistry in Fourah Bay College. He was involved with track and field as an undergraduate student. Kanu was awarded a Commonwealth Scholarship, and moved from Sierra Leone to Manchester for his graduate studies. When he arrived at the University of Manchester Kanu started to work on gas chromatography–mass spectrometry. For his doctoral degree he developed miniaturised systems for environmental monitoring. His doctoral research formed the basis of two patents focussing on membrane sampling, which reduced sampling time by 60%.

== Research and career ==
After earning his doctoral degree, Kanu started a postdoctoral fellowship at Washington State University. He worked alongside Herbert H. Hill Jr. on the development of ion mobility mass spectrometry. He proposed that this work could be used to reduce false positives in airport screening for explosives and drugs, and also showed that it was possible to separate drugs using the drift gas selectivity of ion-mobility spectrometry–mass spectrometry, and this work has since been cited over 1000 times. He has applied ion-mobility spectrometry–mass spectrometry to identify environmental pollutants in both indoor air and contaminated water. He has created a novel sampling system that incorporates a polydimethylsiloxane (PDMS) membrane and nanoparticles for one-step sampling, isolation, separation and desorption of environmental pollutants.

Alongside his academic research, Kanu works to improve the representation of minority students in science. He leads undergraduate research programmes and supports student chapters of the American Chemical Society and National Organization for the Professional Advancement of Black Chemists and Chemical Engineers. Kanu leads the annual Extreme Forensic Instrumentation Experience Lab at Winston-Salem State University, which sees high school seniors take part in a research project themed around a crime drama. He works with Chemists Without Borders to introduce young people in Sierra Leone to practical chemistry skills and help to rebuild the education system after the Civil War. As part of this work, Kanu created affordable green chemistry lab kits, which included materials and manuals.

== Selected publications ==
- Kanu, Abu B.; Dwivedi, Prabha; Tam, Maggie; Matz, Laura; Hill, Herbert H. (2008). "Ion mobility–mass spectrometry". Journal of Mass Spectrometry. 43 (1): 1–22. Bibcode:2008JMSp...43....1K. doi:10.1002/jms.1383. ISSN 1096-9888. PMID 18200615.
- Kanu, Abu B.; Haigh, Paul E.; Hill, Herbert H. (2005-11-30). "Surface detection of chemical warfare agent simulants and degradation products". Analytica Chimica Acta. 553 (1): 148–159. doi:10.1016/j.aca.2005.08.012. ISSN 0003-2670.]
- Kanu, Abu B.; Gribb, Molly M.; Hill, Herbert H. (2008-09-01). "Predicting Optimal Resolving Power for Ambient Pressure Ion Mobility Spectrometry". Analytical Chemistry. 80 (17): 6610–6619. doi:10.1021/ac8008143. ISSN 0003-2700. PMC 2898578. PMID 18683951.
