= Lati Hyde-Forster =

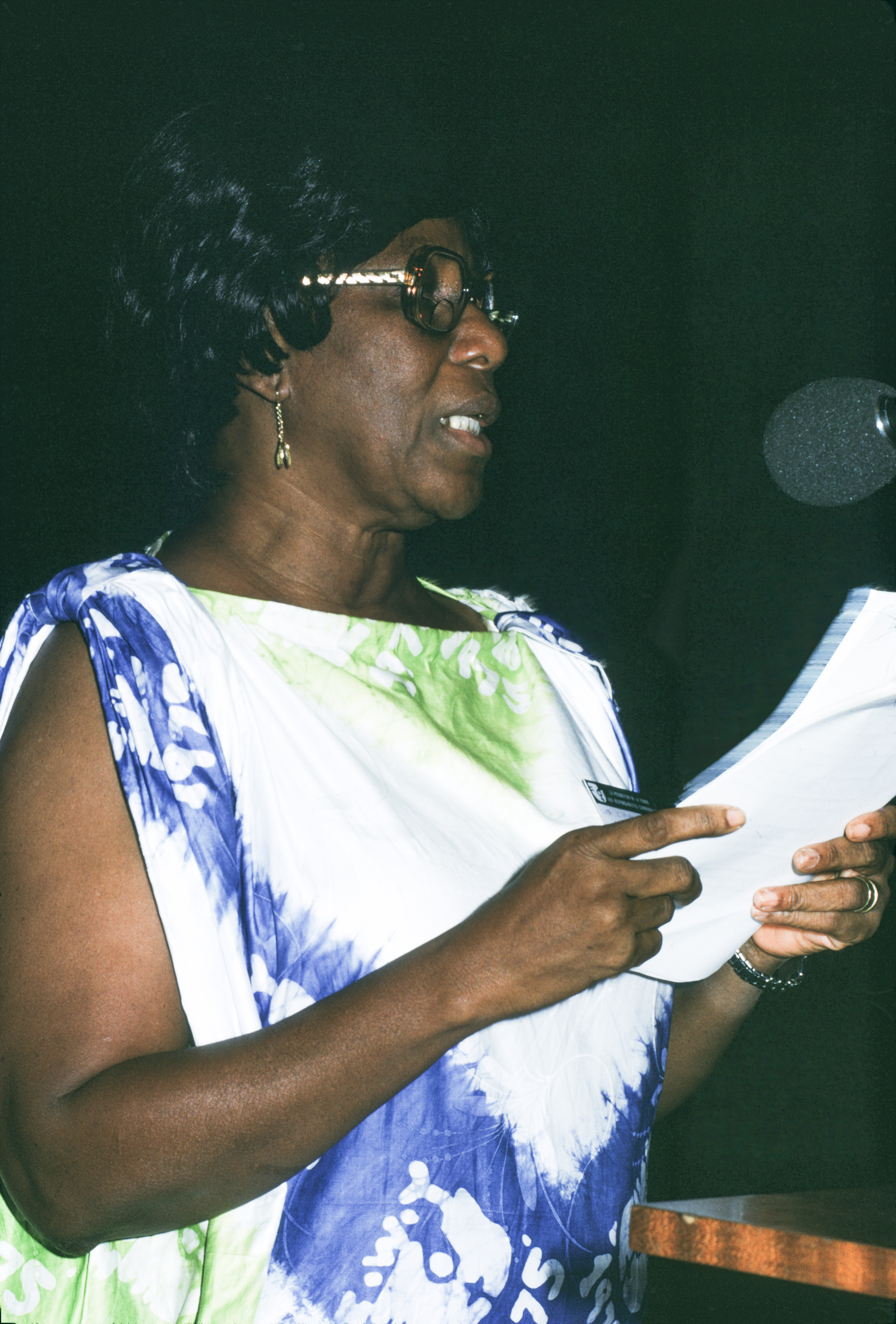
- Lati Hyde-Forster, 1975
- Born: Latilewa Christiana Hyde; 14 June 1911; Freetown, British Sierra Leone
- Died: 12 September 2001 (aged 90); Freetown, Sierra Leone
- Education: University of Cambridge, Boston College
- Occupations: Teacher and principal

Lati Hyde-Forster, MBE (14 June 1911 – 12 September 2001) was the first woman to graduate Fourah Bay College. She was also the first African woman school principal in Sierra Leone.

== Early life and education ==
Latilewa Christiana Hyde was born on 14 June 1911 in Freetown, British Sierra Leone. She is the daughter of Christiana (née Fraser) and Jonathan Hyde Her father was a Methodist Minister and a graduate of Ranmoor College, Sheffield. Her mother was the local postmaster and registrar of births and deaths in Murray Town.

Both of her parents were Krios.

She went to secondary school at Annie Walsh Memorial School. In 1938, she was the first woman to graduate from Fourah Bay College.

She got married in 1947 and became Latilewa Hyde-Forster.

== Career ==
In 1947, Hyde-Forster was a senior teacher at Methodist Girls High School in Gambia.

In 1961, she returned to Annie Walsh Memorial School as Vice-Principal and in 1961 became the first black female principal in Sierra Leone.

== Honors ==
Hyde-Forster received an MBE for her services to education and the community.
