= Lamin Jusu Jarka =

Alhaji Lamin Jusu Jarka is a Sierra Leonean former businessman and current chairman of the victims' right's organization Amputees and War Wounded Association (AWWA). Jarka was the Chief Security Officer of Barclay's Bank in Freetown before the 1999 invasion of Freetown by the Revolutionary United Front rebel group during the recent civil war. During the war, his arms were forcibly amputated after he refused to give his daughter to the troops. After the war ended in 2002, Jarka set up the AWWA principally among the injured that live in a camp in the Murray Town section of Freetown but also as a nationwide organization.
