= Sarah Tucker (model) =

Sierra Leonean model (born 1995)

- Born: Sarah Laura Tucker; 1995 (age 30–31); Bonthe District; Sierra Leone
- Height: 1.71 m (5 ft 7 1/2 in)
- Beauty pageant titleholder
- Title: Miss Sierra Leone 2018
- Hair color: Black
- Eye color: Brown
- Major competitions: Miss Sierra Leone 2018 (Winner); Miss World 2018 (Unplaced)

Sarah Laura Tucker (born 1995) is a Sierra Leonean model and beauty pageant titleholder who was crowned as the winner of the 2018 edition of the Miss Sierra Leone pageant.

== Early life and education ==
Born in Bonthe District, Sierra Leone, Tucker studied mass communication at Fourah Bay College, University of Sierra Leone.

== Pageantry ==
=== Miss Sierra Leone 2018 ===
Whilst representing Bonthe District, Tucker was crowned winner of the 2018 edition of Miss Sierra Leone that was held on 25 August at the Bintumani Conference Centre in Freetown. This result qualified her to represent her country at the Miss World 2018 pageant held on 8 December at the Sanya City Arena in Sanya, China.

=== Miss World 2018 ===
She represented Sierra Leone at the Miss World 2018 pageant but failed to place.

Awards and achievements
Preceded by Aminata Adialin Bangura	Miss Sierra Leone; 2018	Succeeded by Enid Jones-Boston
