= Eugenia Kargbo =

Sierra Leonean heat officer (born 1987)

Eugenia Kargbo (born 1987) is a Sierra Leonean civil servant. In 2021, in an attempt to address the impact of rising temperatures in Freetown, she was appointed the city's heat officer, becoming the first heat officer in Africa.

== Personal life ==
Kargbo was born and raised in Freetown, the capital and largest city in Sierra Leone. She attended Fourah Bay College, a constituent college of the University of Sierra Leone, and also studied for a time in Milan, Italy.

Kargbo lives in Freetown with her two children.

== Career ==
In 2011, Kargbo started working at the United Bank for Africa in customer service. By 2014, she had become the organisation's relationship manager.

In 2017, mudslides in Freetown following days of torrential rain resulted in the deaths of 1,141 people, in addition to over 3000 people becoming homeless. This incident, in addition to concerns Kargbo had on the impact of climate change and deforestation on the livability of Freetown, including for her own children, led to her changing careers. Kargbo began working for Freetown City Council, initially focused on projects around job creation and improving sanitation in the city. Kargbo launched the NetworkMe SL platform, to strengthen the professional skills of young people in Sierra Leone and offering training, internships and contacts with potential employers.

In 2021, Yvonne Aki-Sawyerr, the mayor of Freetown, appointed Kargbo as the city's first heat officer, as part of her "Transform Freetown" initiative. The position was funded through the Adrienne Arsht-Rockefeller Foundation Resilience Centre, part of the Atlantic Council, which saw seven women appointed as heat officers in cities across the world; Kargbo became the first heat officer of an African city. The focus of Kargbo's position was to make Freetown liveable by helping it adapt to the impact of rising temperatures and other features of climate change. She led a project to collect date on heat and housing to develop effective measures tailored to Freetown and its residents.

Kargbo called for a change in building materials for housing, noting that the majority of homes in Freetown were made of corrugated iron, which trapped heat, in addition to being easily damaged during flash floods. She advocated for developing white roofs on buildings to keep them cooler, and constructed shelters in public spaces including parks and markets in order to protect citizens and vendors from extreme heat, particularly during the afternoons. She has been critical of the government's continued support of deforestation.

Kargbo launched the "Freetown the Tree Town" campaign, which aimed to plant a million trees in Freetown by the end of 2022. By the beginning of 2023, an estimated 550, 000 trees had been planted, with 450, 000 surviving. Some of Kargbo's proposals have been described as being impacted by a lack of government funding; it has also been suggested that conflict between the central Sierra Leonean government and the municipal government of Aki-Sawyerr, who is a member of the opposition All People's Congress party, led to funding shortfalls and a lack of interest in supporting the project.

== Recognition ==
In 2022, Time named Kargbo as one of its "100 Next" of up and coming figures that are shaping the future.
