= Laïla Abdou Tadjiri =

- Occupation: Film director, model

Laïla Abdou Tadjiri is a filmmaker and model from the Comoros.

Tadjiri made her first film, L’illusion, in 2014 with a smartphone and it went on to win third prize at the Pocket Film Festival that year. Her second film, L'encre de la mer ("Ink of the Sea", 2015), won Best Local Film at the 2015 Comoros International Film Festival (CIFF). Her film Je lutte donc je suis (2017), a documentary about a family who recycles plastic bags, was part of the Ecoclip competition held by the Commission de l’Océan Indien. Her Un jeune=un emploi (2018) is a documentary about the election of Comoros President Azali Assoumani and won best documentary at the Festival international de court-métrage de Pointe-Noire.

Tadjiri began modeling in 2014 and represented Comoros at the 2017 Miss University Africa.
