= Thomas Dekker =

Thomas Dekker may refer to:

- Thomas Dekker (writer) (c. 1572–1632), Elizabethan poet and dramatist
- Thomas Dekker (actor) (born 1987), American film and television actor and musician
- Thomas Dekker (cyclist) (born 1984), Dutch road racing cyclist

== See also ==
- Thomas Leighton Decker (1916–1978), Sierra Leonean poet, linguist, and journalist
