= Samuel O. Ighodaro =

Nigerian barrister and judge

Samuel Osarogie Ighodaro QC, OFR

Justice of the High Court of the Mid-Western Region, Nigeria
- In office 1968–1973
- President: Yakubu Gowon

Minister of Justice and Attorney- General, Western Region of Nigeria
- In office 1959–1963

Executive Director of the Western Nigeria Development Corporation
- In office 1958–1960

Minister of Health, Western Region of Nigeria
- In office 1952–1956

Member of the Federal House of Representatives
- In office 1952–1956

Member of the Western Region Legislative Assembly
- In office 1952–1956

Commissioner for Boundary Settlement, Bendel State
- In office 1973–1977

Chairman of the Bendel Civil Service Commission
- In office 1979–1983

Personal details
- Born: 21 March 1911 Benin City, Nigeria
- Died: 5 June 1994 (aged 83) Benin City, Nigeria
- Spouse: Irene Ighodaro (m. 1947)
- Relations: Robert Wellesley-Cole (brother-in-law)
- Children: 4
- Education: Fourah Bay College; Durham University (B.A.); University College London (M.A., BCL, LL. B); Gray's Inn (BL)
- Occupation: Barrister; Jurist; Judge; Politician; Traditional Leader

Samuel Osarogie Ighodaro, QC, OFR (21 March 1911 – 5 June 1994) was a Nigerian barrister, jurist, judge, politician and traditional leader who served as the Minister of Justice and Attorney-General, Western Region of Nigeria from 1959 to 1963 and a Justice of the High Court of the Mid-Western Region from 1968 to 1973. He was later installed as the Iyase of Benin in 1982.

== Early life and education ==
Samuel Osarogie Ighodaro was born on 21 March 1911 in Benin City which would later become part of the Mid-Western Region, Nigeria (later also known as the Bendel State). A member of the Edo people of Benin, he had his early education at St. Peter’s School, Benin City. He attended St. Andrews College, Oyo from 1928 to 1931. He attended Fourah Bay College in Freetown, Sierra Leone from 1935 to 1940 and received a B.A. degree from Durham University, then the parent institution of the College. Between 1945 and 1950, he studied at University College London and Gray's Inn. He was called to the English Bar, Gray’s Inn in 1949 where he became a Barrister-at-Law. He received M.A., BCL, LL. B degrees upon the completion of his legal studies.

== Career ==
From 1940 to 1945, he was a teacher at Igbobi College, Lagos where he was also a House Master. He was elected a Member of the Western Region Legislative Assembly from 1952 to 1956 and within that period, he concurrently served as the Minister of Health for the Western Region and a Member of the Federal House of Representatives. After losing his seat in the 1956 legislative elections, he set up his own chambers and was engaged in Private Legal Practice with Rosiji, Ighodaro and Agbaje Williams Chambers from 1956 to 1957. In 1958, he became the Executive Director of Western Nigeria Development Corporation, serving until 1960. From 1950 to 1962, he was the Treasurer of the now defunct Action Group political party.

He served as Minister of Justice and Attorney- General, Western Region from 1959 to 1963. Briefly entering academia, he became a Senior Lecturer at the University of Lagos from 1966 to 1967. He was appointed judge of the High Court of the Midwestern Region from 1968 to 1973. He retired as a High Court Judge in 1973.

== Later life ==
He then became the Commissioner for Boundary Settlement in Bendel State from 1973 to 1977. He was also the Chairman of the Bendel Civil Service Commission from 1979 to 1984.

Ighodaro was installed as the Iyase of Benin in 1982. The Iyase of Benin is the traditional prime minister and second in command of the Benin Kingdom. The Iyase is also the Chief Adviser to the Oba of Benin, the traditional and spiritual ruler of the Edo people and historically, the head of state of the erstwhile Benin Empire.

== Personal life ==
While living in Britain, he met physician, Irene Elizabeth Beatrice Wellesley-Cole of Freetown, Sierra Leone who had studied medicine at Durham and became the first Sierra Leonean woman to become a physician. The wedding took place in England in 1947. The couple had 4 children, three sons and a daughter - Tony, Wilfred, Ayo, and Yinka.

He was appointed the Chancellor of the Anglican Diocese of Benin in 1960 and served in this role until his demise in 1994. He served as President of the Bendel State Branch of the Nigerian Red Cross Society in Benin City.

== Awards of Honours ==
He received a foreign honour and was conferred with Queens Counsel (QC) in 1961. In 1982, he was conferred with a National Honour, Officer of the Order of the Federal Republic (OFR) He received an Honorary Degree and was conferred with Doctor of Laws degree honoris causa (Hon. LL. D) from Bendel State University, Ekpoma, Bendel State.

== Death ==
He died of natural causes at his home in Benin City on 5 June 1994.
