= Mariatu Kargbo =

Sierra Leonean beauty pageant winner (born 1985)

- Born: Mariatu Kargbo; 1985 (age 40–41); Makeni; Bombali District; Sierra Leone
- Height: 1.73 m (5 ft 8 in)
- Beauty pageant titleholder
- Title: Miss Sierra Leone 2009
- Hair color: Black
- Eye color: Brown
- Major competitions: Miss Sierra Leone 2009 (Winner); Miss World 2009 (Top 16)

Mariatu Kargbo (born 1985) is a Sierra Leonean model and beauty pageant titleholder who was crowned as the winner of the 2009 edition of the Miss Sierra Leone pageant.

== Early life and education ==
Born in Bombali District Sierra Leone, Kargbo attended secondary school in Freetown.

== Pageantry ==
=== Miss Sierra Leone 2009 ===
Whilst representing Bombali District, Kargbo was crowned winner of the 2009 edition of Miss Sierra Leone that was held on 13 June 2019 at the Family Kingdom Entertainment Complex in Freetown. This result qualified her to represent her country at the Miss World 2009 pageant held on 12 December at the Gallagher Convention Centre in Johannesburg, South Africa.

=== Miss World 2009 ===
She represented Sierra Leone at the Miss World 2009 pageant and placed in the Top Sixteen. This is the highest that any Sierra Leonean has finished at a Miss World contest.

Awards and achievements
Preceded by Tyrilla Gouldson	Miss Sierra Leone; 2009	Succeeded by Neyorlyn Williams
