= Leone Preparatory School =

Educational institution in Freetown, Sierra Leone

- Freetown; Sierra Leone

Information
- School type: Independent Co-educational Primary Preparatory school
- Established: 1961
- Founder: Bertha Yvonne Conton
- Director: Dr Brian Conton
- Principal: Bertha Conton
- Campus: King Harman Road, Freetown, Sierra Leone
- Campus size: 300–400 students

The Leone Preparatory School, also known as Bertha Conton or The Bertha Conton School, is an independent co-educational primary preparatory school based in Freetown, Sierra Leone founded by Bertha Yvonne Conton, a Sierra Leonean educator, principal, and school proprietress. The school was established in Bo, Sierra Leone in 1961 and was subsequently transferred to Freetown, Sierra Leone. The school is consistently ranked as one of the premier educational institutions in Sierra Leone.

== History ==
The school was informally established in Bo, Sierra Leone in 1961 when Bertha Conton started giving lessons to children on the veranda of her home. The school later transferred operations to Freetown, Sierra Leone and was formally established in 1963.

== School profile ==
The school had the record for the highest marks ever achieved at the National Primary School Exams in a year that saw its pupils placing first, second and third in the country. The institution still consistently places one to two pupils in the first ten in the country at the national exam. Furthermore, the school still has the record for the highest marks ever achieved at the National Primary School Exams in a year that saw its pupils placing first, second and third in the country.

== Teaching methods and curriculum ==
The school developed and uses an ultra-modern school curriculum that incorporates elements of the child-centered Montessori method of education or the Montessori philosophy for early year students in addition to computer based instruction, with a variable based learning style methodology geared towards self-directed scholarship by students.

== Current Campus at King Harman Road, Freetown ==
By 1992, Bertha Conton privately financed and built the current campus at King Harman Road with a computer lab and an assembly hall. The current campus is a modern facility designed for up to 400 pupils.

== Achievements ==
- On its first attempt at what was then known as the Common Entrance exams, the school obtained the best results in the country.

== Alumni ==
- Desmond Finney, a Sierra Leonean actor.

== Sources ==
- https://awokonewspaper.com/sierra-leone-news-leone-preparatory-school-accused-of-victimisation/
- http://awokonewspaper.com/sierra-leone-news-letter-to-the-editor-2/
- https://publications.parliament.uk/pa/ld201415/ldhansrd/lhan113.pdf
- https://hansard.parliament.uk/Lords/2015-03-05/debates/15030536000284/WomenEconomicEmpowerment
- https://medium.com/@stephenvlansana/sierra-leone-news-kdu-donates-childrens-books-to-three-schools-8acb0eb7d1e4
- https://www.freetownpitchnight.com/2018/10/16/pitch-night-october-17th-2018/
- https://cocorioko.net/the-education-ministry-and-leone-preparatory-school-issue/
- https://groups.google.com/g/usaafricadialogue/c/I3Tb25PA1HE?pli=1
