= Florence Dillsworth =

Sierra leonean educator

- Born: Florence Agnes Dillsworth; 11 December 1937; Freetown, Sierra Leone
- Died: 9 September 2000 (aged 62); Freetown, Sierra Leone
- Education: St. Joseph's Convent School
- Occupations: Educator; teacher; principal; mayor

Florence Agnes Dillsworth (1937–2000), was a Sierra Leonean educator who served as principal of St. Joseph's Convent School and was the third mayor of Freetown, Sierra Leone.

== Early life ==
Florence Agnes Dillsworth was born to Sierra Leone Creole parents, Wilmot Aloysius Dillsowrth (1908–1985), the town clerk of Freetown, and Jeanne Dillsworth, née Peacourt. Florence Dillsworth attended the St. Joseph's Convent School in Freetown, Sierra Leone and was subsequently educated in England.

== Political career ==
Florence Dillsworth was elected as the third female mayor of Freetown on the Freetown City Council.

== Death ==
Florence Dillsworth died in February 2000 in London. She was buried in Ascension Town Cemetery, Freetown, Sierra Leone.
