= Twilla Ojukutu-Macauley =

Sierra Leonean beauty pageant contestant

- Born: Twilla Ojukutu-Macauley; 1967 (age 58–59); Freetown; Sierra Leone
- Height: 1.70 m (5 ft 7 in)
- Beauty pageant titleholder
- Title: Miss Sierra Leone 1988
- Hair color: Black
- Eye color: Brown
- Major competitions: Miss Sierra Leone 1988 (Winner); Miss World 1988 (Unplaced)

Twilla Ojukutu-Macauley (born 1967) is a Sierra Leonean model and beauty pageant titleholder who was crowned as the winner of the 1988 edition of the Miss Sierra Leone pageant.

== Early life and education ==
Born into a Creole family in Freetown, Sierra Leone; Ojukutu-Macauley attended Freetown Secondary School for Girls and later worked as a receptionist for the Reliance Insurance Trust Corporation.

== Pageantry ==
=== Miss Sierra Leone 1988 ===
Whilst representing Western Area Urban District, Ojukutu-Macauley was crowned winner of the 1988 edition of Miss Sierra Leone that was held in Freetown. This result qualified her to represent her country at the Miss World 1988 pageant held on 17 November at the Royal Albert Hall in London, UK.

=== Miss World 1988 ===
She represented Sierra Leone at the Miss World 1988 pageant but failed to place.

Awards and achievements
Preceded by Alice Matta Fefegula	Miss Sierra Leone; 1988	Succeeded by Sia Matturi
