= Irene Ighodaro =

Sierra Leone Creole physician and social reformer (1916 –1995)

Irene Ighodaro MBE
- Born: Irene Elizabeth Beatrice Wellesley-Cole; 16 May 1916; Freetown, Sierra Leone
- Died: 29 November 1995 (aged 79); Nigeria
- Education: Annie Walsh Memorial School; University of Durham (M.B.B.S)
- Occupation: Physician
- Known for: First Sierra Leonean woman in orthodox medicine
- Spouse: Samuel O. Ighodaro (m. 1947; died 1994)
- Children: 4
- Parents: Wilfred Wellesley-Cole (father); Elizabeth Okrafo-Smart (mother)
- Relatives: Robert Wellesley-Cole (brother)
- Medical career
- Field: Gynaecology; Paediatrics

Irene Elizabeth Beatrice Ighodaro née Wellesley-Cole (16 May 1916 – 29 November 1995) was a Sierra Leone Creole physician and social reformer who was the first Sierra Leonean woman to qualify as a medical doctor and the first West African-born female doctor in Britain. She was president of the Young Women's Christian Association of Nigeria. She was also the first President of the Medical Association of Nigerian Women.

== Life ==
Ighodaro was born Irene Elizabeth Beatrice Wellesley-Cole in Freetown, Sierra Leone, one of seven children of civil engineer, Wilfred Wellesley-Cole who was the superintendent of Freetown waterworks. Her elder brother was physician Robert Wellesley-Cole. She attended the Government Model School and graduated from the Annie Walsh Memorial School. She decided to become a physician after nursing her mother, Elizabeth Cole (née Okrafo-Smart), through a terminal illness. She attended Newcastle-upon-Tyne Medical School and received her M.B.B.S. from the University of Durham in England in 1944. She was one of three women in her medical school class of sixty students. She then worked for six months as a House Officer in the Department of Maternity and Gynaecology. From January 1945 to September 1946, she managed her brother’s private practice while he was on a work assignment with the Colonial Office in West Africa. Her brother eventually sold his private practice upon his return to Britain in 1946.

While living in England she co-founded the Newcastle-based Society for the Cultural Advancement of Africa and the first West African Women’s Association in England. She was also actively involved in the West African Students Union and the League of Coloured Peoples. During the World War II, she treated casualties and worked on the decontamination squad at the Royal Victoria Infirmary. in Newcastle.

In 1947, she married Nigerian barrister Samuel Osarogie Ighodaro of Benin City with whom she had four children; Tony, Wilfred, Ayo, and Yinka.

After their wedding, she and her husband relocated to East Croydon and resided at the International Language Club. Later in 1947, she received an appointment in Brighton where she worked as a physician at the New Sussex Hospital for Women and Children. She stayed at the hospital's residential quarters for medical staff and returned to East Croydon every weekend to be with her family. They moved to Nigeria in 1949, where her husband eventually became a judge on the High Court of Midwestern Region of Nigeria.

Ighodaro maintained a private medical practice and was a member of a number of western Nigerian medical advisory committees. She consulted the World Health Organization on child and maternal health and authored the book Baby's First Year. She also helped set up the University of Benin Teaching Hospital, modelling it after the Royal Victoria Infirmary and was the first chair of its board of management and was a member of the YWCA World Executive Committee. She presided over the Nigerian National Council of Women’s Societies and Association of University Women. She was made a Member of the Order of the British Empire (MBE) in 1958.

=== Death and legacy ===
Ighodaro died on 29 November 1995. The Dr. Irene Ighodaro Memorial Foundation was set up in her honour. In 2022,her story was also featured in an exhibition at the Discovery Museum in Newcastle called ‘Stories of Service: Tyneside’s Home Front during the Second World War’, which was co-curated by equalities activist, academic, author and community facilitator Beverley Prevatt-Goldstein, in partnership with Imperial War Museums (IWM). In 2024, a public mural was unveiled of Irene Ighodaro at Guy's Hospital in London. In June 2025, a blue plaque in honour of Irene Ighodaro was unveiled at a student residence, Jesmond View in Newcastle.
