= Bertha Conton =

Sierra Leonean educator (1923–2022)

Bertha Yvonne Conton GCOR
- Bertha Yvonne Conton
- Born: 31 October 1923; Freetown, Sierra Leone
- Died: 1 May 2022 (aged 98); Freetown, Sierra Leone
- Education: St. Joseph's Primary School, St. Joseph's Convent School,
- Occupations: Educationalist, principal, teacher, school proprietress
- Spouse: William Farquhar Conton
- Children: 5
- Relatives: Thomas Josiah Thompson (father), Raymond Sarif Easmon (brother), Amy Manto Bondfield Wellesley-Cole, née Hotobah-During (sister), Robert Wellesley-Cole (brother-in-law)

Bertha Yvonne Conton, GCOR (née Thompson; 31 October 1923 – 1 May 2022) was a Sierra Leone Creole educator who was the principal, founder, and proprietress of Leone Preparatory School.

== Biography ==
Conton was educated at St. Joseph's Primary School and subsequently at St. Joseph's Convent School in Freetown, Sierra Leone. She completed her post-secondary school education in Liverpool, England.

On her return to Freetown, Conton started her teaching career at St Joseph's Convent and the Freetown Secondary School for Girls. After a brief stay in Ghana where she taught at the International School of Accra, her family moved to Bo, Sierra Leone. There in 1961, Conton founded the Leone Preparatory School, also known as the "Bertha Conton School", when she started giving lessons to children on the veranda of her home in Bo. The school later transferred operations to Freetown, in 1963.

Conton was married to William Farquhar Conton, an educator, historian, and author. She died in Freetown on 1 May 2022, at the age of 98.

== Awards and recognition ==
- In 2012, Conton was invested as a Grand Commander of the Order of Rokel, the highest and most prestigious decoration in Sierra Leone, for her contributions to education.
- In the House of Lords, Lord Paul Boateng paid tribute to Conton, who taught him how to read.
