= The African (Conton novel) =

1964 novel by William Farquhar Conton

- Author: William Farquhar Conton
- Language: English
- Genre: Fiction
- Published: 1964
- Publisher: Heinemann

The African is the 1964 debut novel by Sierra Leonean novelist and educator William Farquhar Conton. It was the 12th work published in Heinemann's African Writers Series. The novel's plot revolves around the romance between a black African student and a white South African woman in England.

== Themes and style ==
The novel turns autobiographical elements into a call for Africa to move as a continent beyond apartheid. Wole Soyinka criticised its utopian "love optimism", calling the novel's main character, Kamara, an "unbelievable prig".

== Reception ==
Contemporary reviewer Mercedes Mackay describe the novel as a "promising first novel" which excels in highlighting the author's "rich sense of humor" and his role as "a fine philosopher". Mackay compared the novel to the debuts of Cyprian Ekwensi (People of the City), Chinua Achebe (Things Fall Apart) and Kamara Laye (The African Child).
