= Sierra Leone Anti-corruption Commission =

Independent agency of the Sierra Leone Government

The Sierra Leone Anti-corruption Commission (ACC-SL) commonly known as ACC is an independent agency of the Sierra Leone Government, that investigates and prosecutes corruption cases in Sierra Leone. The ACC is supervised by the Sierra Leone Ministry of Justice. The current Head of the ACC is Francis Ben Kaifala, who has been in office since June 2018.

The ACC was established by the Anti-Corruption Act passed by the Sierra Leone Parliament in 2000 under the leadership of then Sierra Leone's president Ahmad Tejan Kabbah. It supersedes the 1960 Prevention of Corruption Act. The Head of the ACC is appointed by the president of Sierra Leone and must be confirmed by the Parliament of Sierra Leone. The Sierra Leone president has the constitutional authority to sack the ACC Head at any time.

== Formation ==
The ACC was established following the 1990s civil war to investigate rampant corruption in public agencies, then beginning to receive renewed foreign investment. The 2000 Anti-Corruption Act established the ACC as an independent commission to investigate government corruption. The ACC was partially funded and staffed by foreign (mostly British) experts, although in 2007 the British government withdrew support claiming the ACC were not given broad enough powers.

Its first major action was to order the arrest of Sierra Leone's Minister of Transport and Communications Momoh Pujeh and his wife for involvement in the illegal diamond trade which funded much of the Civil War. Corruption is seen as a generalised problem of huge proportions in Sierra Leone, and a contributing factor to the outbreak and continuation of the bloody civil war which destroyed the nation. As late as 2007, the government itself admitted that entire ministries failed to produce any work, as their entire budgets were being diverted through corruption. A BBC journalist interviewed the Foreign Minister in 2007 and found that her office toilets were never connected to water sources as construction contractors failed to carry out jobs for which they were paid.

Earlier accusations that the ACC was not committed to fighting corruption declined after the change in government in 2018. With a new commitment from President Julius Maada Bio, considerable efforts have been made aimed at corruption control and the country has repositioned itself to more robustly deal with corruption. One foreign commentator accused the pre-2004 ACC in a World Bank study of being a "Phoney" reform organisation, created to "appease foreign donors" but not effectively fight government corruption. This is no longer the case with the commission now pursuing cases involving past and present government officials with no favoritism or sacred cows.

== Reforms ==
In November 2005, ACC head Valentine Collier was himself sacked, accused of involvement in corruption, although his defenders argue he was sacrificed by the Sierra Leone parliament to appease the British government's Department for International Development (DFID), the ACC's primary funder.

In 2005, its power to prosecute was removed from the office of the Sierra Leone Attorney General, and given to an independent three person body.

In early 2008, the commission's powers were again amended to give it direct arrest and prosecutorial powers following the electoral victory of President Ernest Bai Koroma in September 2007 on a platform that made new anti-corruption actions a central plank. In October 2007, Henry Joko-Smart was removed as chair, accused of not doing enough to move prosecutions forward, and replaced with human-rights lawyer Abdul Tejan-Cole. Active cases have dramatically increased from 2004. Notable 2008 prosecution targets included the former senior Sierra Leonian government Ombudsman and 12 officials of the Customs and Excise Department of the National Revenue Authority (NRA) as well as one police officer connected with the NRA. In 2010 Tejan-Cole stepped down to become the executive director of the Open Society Initiative for West Africa. The story of the Anti-Corruption Commission has been different since June 2018 with the change in leadership not just for the commission but also for the country. Prosecutions and investigations now cover the high and low including current and past government officials, the judiciary, the police, the private sector, the revenue generating bodies, the educational sector and even the Presidency. High Profile cases include those against the Former Vice President Victor Foh, the former Head of the National Revenue Authority Haja Kallah Kamara, Former head of the National Maritime Administration, the current Minister of Labour Alpha Timbo, and many others. These new developments are encouraging as the commission is becoming the model of the fight against corruption in Africa with a lot to be hopeful about.

The current head of the ACC is Francis Ben Kaifala.
