= St. Joseph's Primary School (Sierra Leone) =

All-girls school in Sierra Leone

Information
- Established: 1866; 159 years ago
- Gender: Girls
- Age: 3 to 12

St. Joseph's Primary School is an all-girls primary (elementary) school located at Howe Street in Freetown, Sierra Leone. The school was founded in 1866 by the Sisters of St. Joseph of Cluny, Roman Catholic nuns from Italy, France and Ireland. It is the oldest girls' primary school in Sierra Leone and one of the oldest elementary schools in Africa. Typically, the school enrolls girls aged from 3 to 12.

== Background ==
It was originally established as two sister institutions, St. Mary's Primary School and St. Anne's Primary School, which in 1985 were amalgamated to form St. Joseph's. The school is currently situated at Howe Street, Freetown, in the same compound that used to house its secondary school, now known as St. Joseph's Secondary School and formerly known as St. Joseph's Convent in Freetown. Its brother school is St. Edward's Primary School.

== Past headteachers ==
- Mrs Gilpin

== House system ==
The school is divided into several houses, named after the original houses of its predecessor schools, St. Mary's and St. Anne's.

- Martha - [Red]
- Column - [Blue]
- Patricks - [Green]
- Leo - [Yellow]
- St. Joseph's - [Pink]
- St. Theresa - [Brown]
- Our Lady - [White]

== Notable alumni ==
- Bertha Conton
- Agnes Taylor-Lewis - first female Minister of Health in Sierra Leone
