= Thomas Leighton Decker =

Sierra Leonean linguist, poet and journalist

- Born: Thomas Alexander Leighton Decker; 25 July 1916; Calabar, Nigeria
- Died: September 7, 1978; London, England
- Education: CMS Grammar School
- Occupations: Journalist, linguist, poet
- Writing career
- Language: English

Thomas Alexander Leighton Decker OBE (25 July 1916 – 7 September 1978) was a Sierra Leonean linguist, poet, and journalist. He is best known for his work on the Krio language and for translating Shakespeare's Julius Caesar into the Krio language. Decker argued forcefully that the Krio language was not merely a patois but a legitimate language. Because Decker argued that Krio was not a patois, his contributions and revisions to the Krio language greatly influenced and added to the revival and appreciation of the language.

== Background and early life ==
Thomas Decker was born to Sierra Leonean parents, Joseph Leighton Decker and Jane Decker (née Fraser), in Calabar, Nigeria. His father was a colonial surveyor and architect, while his mother was a trader. Decker was the fourth child and had six siblings, one of whom later studied to become a doctor in England.

His mother, Jane, was from a large family from Murray Town, descended from David Pakudi Fraser, a Liberated African slave (of Nigerian origin) who after being freed from the holds of a slave ship was settled in Murray Town. Jane was the eldest daughter of Thomas Crowley Fraser, the son of Pakudi Fraser. T. C. Fraser was a successful merchant and one-time Justice of Peace of the Waterloo District in Sierra Leone. The Fraser family was quite prominent and alongside the Hyde family (some branches of Hydes were of Fraser stock) owned large plots of land in Murray Town.

He lived in Calabar until the death of his father in 1920, when his mother decided to move the family back to Sierra Leone and where he attended the CMS Grammar School in Freetown. After graduating from the grammar school, Decker entered the Teacher Training Department at Fourah Bay College. After completing his training, Decker taught for eighteen months before deciding to become a journalist and writer.

== Journalism and Civil Service ==
Decker had tried to join the Royal Air Force but was unable to because he had eye problems. He continued to write and worked for ITA Wallace-Johnson's African Standard. Decker's "radical" views of the day were reflected during his work for the Standard. Later on he was editor of the Daily Guardian a premier newspaper in the colony. During his editorship of the Guardian, Decker was known for his skilled writing, and contributions to national affairs in Sierra Leone.

== Political activities ==
Decker was a disciple of Isaac Wallace-Johnson's West African Youth League, which had a strong anti-colonial message and who fought for equality and independence of Sierra Leone and its citizens. Decker believed in the unification of the Protectorate and the Crown Colony, and he believed that the Krio language would have a large part to play in realizing the dream of a united Sierra Leone.

== Revision on the Krio language ==
Thomas Decker was one of the first people to term Sierra Leone's lingua franca "Krio". He argued for the widespread use of Krio throughout the country, and to him it was a unifying force for the nation after independence. Decker's work on the Krio language sparked a revival in the appreciation for the language. During the 1960s, Decker was considered to be the leader of young Krio linguists, and it was during this time period that some of his most famous works were published.

== Later years and legacy ==
Decker became sick in June 1978, and on 7 September 1978 he died at the Royal Masonic Hospital in London. The decade before his death, Decker had been at the forefront of the national movement of that time, and he was remembered for his work on the Krio language in the bicentenary celebration of the founding of the Province of Freedom. Shortly before his death, Decker was awarded an OBE for his literary efforts.

== Miscellaneous ==
- Lati Hyde, the first female graduate of Fourah Bay College and first African principal of Annie Walsh Memorial School, was a member of the Fraser family and she was Thomas Decker's first cousin.
- Talabi Lucan, a Sierra Leonean author, is the first cousin of Thomas Decker, through her descent from the Fraser family.
- Christiana Thorpe, the current chief of the Sierra Leone National Electoral Commission, is the third cousin of Thomas Decker due to her descent from the Fraser family of Murray Town.
- Thomas Decker was named for his maternal grandfather, Thomas C. Fraser, and he delved into research on the Decker and Fraser families.
- Decker also had an interest in drawing, which may have been due to his father's work as an architect

== Published works ==
- Death of Boss Coker (24–25 October 1939)
- Julius Caesar (1964)
- Udat de kiap fit: a Krio adaptation of As You Like It (1966)
- Tales of the Forest (London: Evans Bros, 1968)

== See also ==
- Krio language
- Sierra Leone Creole people

== Sources ==
- Neville Shrimpton, Thomas Decker and The Death of Boss Coker (1987)
