= Chidi Blyden =

American foreign policy advisor

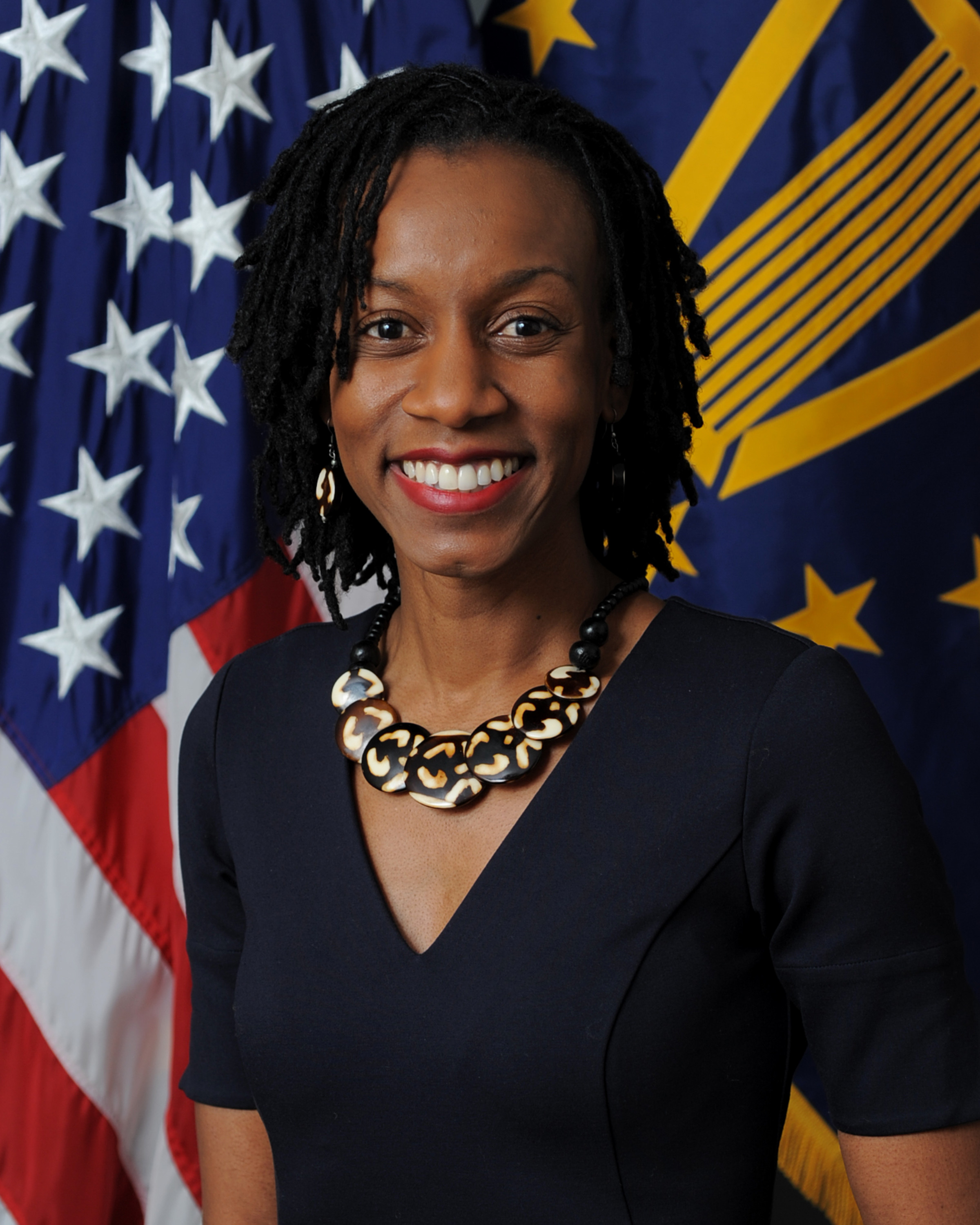

Deputy CEO of the Millennium Challenge Corporation
- In office October 2023 – January 2025
- President: Joe Biden

Deputy Assistant Secretary of Defense for African Affairs
- In office May 2021 – October 2023
- President: Joe Biden
- Preceded by: Alan Patterson
- Succeeded by: Maureen Farrell

Personal details
- Party: Democratic
- Relatives: Edward Wilmot Blyden; Edward Wilmot Blyden III
- Education: Texas A&M University (BS); George Mason University (MS)
- Awards: Secretary of Defense Exceptional Civilian Service Award (2)

Chidi Blyden is an American foreign policy and security sector advisor who focuses on defense, diplomacy and development on Africa and the Western Hemisphere. Blyden previously serves as deputy chief executive officer of the Millennium Challenge Corporation in the Biden Administration. Prior to that, Blyden was the deputy assistant secretary of defense for African affairs.

== Early life and education ==
Chidi Blyden was born in Portsmouth, England, and raised in Fort Worth, Texas. Blyden, whose family is originally from Sierra Leone, attended the Annie Walsh Memorial School for one year in 1994 shortly before the civil war broke out. She then graduated from Crowley High School in 1998. Later, she earned a Bachelor of Science degree in sociology from Texas A&M University and a Master of Science in conflict, analysis, and resolution from the Carter School for Peace and Conflict Resolution at George Mason University. She speaks French and Krio.

== Career ==
Blyden began her national security career with the Africa Center for Strategic Studies. There, she managed academic programs and outreach.

=== Obama administration ===
In 2013, Blyden joined the Obama administration as special assistant and peacekeeping advisor in the Office of Stability & Humanitarian Affairs at the United States Department of Defense. Later, she also served as the special assistant to the deputy assistant secretary of defense for African affairs.

After leaving government in 2017, Blyden led the African program at the Center for Civilians in Conflict, developing and delivering training to African defense forces on civilian harm mitigation. In 2019, she joined the United States House Committee on Armed Services as a professional staff member focusing on security issues in Africa and South and Central America.

=== Biden administration ===
In May 2021, Blyden was named as the deputy assistant secretary of defense for African affairs. In October 2023, Blyden was appointed deputy chief executive officer of the Millennium Challenge Corporation. In this capacity she led the investment strategy towards African nations.
