= Neyorlyn Williams =

Sierra Leonean beauty pageant contestant

- Born: Neyorlyn Melrose Williams; 1991 (age 34–35); Freetown; Sierra Leone
- Height: 1.77 m (5 ft 9 1/2 in)
- Beauty pageant titleholder
- Title: Miss Sierra Leone 2010
- Hair color: Black
- Eye color: Brown
- Major competitions: Miss Sierra Leone 2010 (Winner); Miss World 2010 (Unplaced)

Neyorlyn Melrose Williams (born 1991) is a Sierra Leonean model and beauty pageant titleholder who was crowned as the winner of the 2010 edition of the Miss Sierra Leone pageant.

== Early life and education ==
Born in Freetown, Sierra Leone; Williams attended St. Joseph's Convent School and later pursued an international diploma in Human Resource Management with Cambridge University.

== Pageantry ==
=== Miss Sierra Leone 2010 ===
Whilst representing Western Area Urban District, Williams was crowned winner of the 2010 edition of Miss Sierra Leone that was held on July 30 at the Family Kingdom Entertainment Complex in Freetown. This result qualified her to represent her country at the Miss World 2010 pageant held on 30 October at the Crown of Beauty Theatre in Sanya, China.

=== Miss World 2010 ===
She represented Sierra Leone at the Miss World 2010 pageant but failed to place.

Awards and achievements
Preceded by Mariatu Kargbo	Miss Sierra Leone; 2010	Succeeded by Natasha Beckley
