= Shekou Touray =

Sierra Leonean diplomat

Shekou Momodou Touray

Permanent Representative of Sierra Leone to the United Nations
- President: Ernest Bai Koroma

Personal details
- Born: 22 September 1945 (age 81) Bonthe, Bonthe District, Sierra Leone
- Education: Fourah Bay College; King's College London (LLB)
- Profession: Lawyer, economist and diplomat

Shekou Momodou Touray (born 22 September 1945) is a Sierra Leonean diplomat who served as the Permanent Representative of Sierra Leone to the United Nations.

He was educated at Fourah Bay College, Sierra Leone and at King's College London, graduating with an LLB.

A legal practitioner, he previously served as a Barrister and Solicitor of the High Court of Sierra Leone. He was a Presidential Appointee to the Law Reform Commission in 2003.

Touray is a member of the Mandingo ethnic group and a native of Bonthe District in southern Sierra Leone. He is married with five children.
