= Institute of Public Administration and Management =

- Type: Public
- Established: 1980
- Principal: Professor Miriam Conteh-Morgan
- Location: Freetown, Sierra Leone
- Campus: A. J. Momoh Street & George Street
- Affiliations: University of Sierra Leone
- Website: www.usl.ipam.edu.sl

The Institute of Public Administration and Management (IPAM) is an institute of the University of Sierra Leone. It operates like other constituent colleges of the University of Sierra Leone, under the authority of the University Senate and the University Court. IPAM is in the centre of Freetown at AJ Momoh Street, Tower Hill, close to the British Council, Statistics Sierra Leone, the West African Examination Council (WAEC) and the National Fire Force headquarters. The institute has four departments offering a range of business, information technology, finance and public administration courses to the public.

== Establishment ==
The establishment of IPAM can be traced to 1970. It came as a result of a government white paper on education which proposed the closure of the Civil Service Training College. The responsibility for the training of middle- and upper-level staff was transferred to Fourah Bay College and that of the clerical cadre to the Freetown Technical Institute.

Subsequent review by the World Bank suggested the need for a more specialised establishment in public administration and management. Discussions between the World Bank and the government of Sierra Leone resulted in the decision to establish the Institute of Public Administration and Management as an institute of the University of Sierra Leone.

Funds were made available under the Second IDA Education Project for construction of suitable accommodation for the institute. The building on the site of the then Civil Service Training College was occupied in June 1980 and the institute started work in the 1980/81 academic year.

== Management ==
The institute is managed by a dean of campus (formerly director) who reports directly to the vice-chancellor and principal of the University of Sierra Leone. A management team comprises the dean of campus, assistant dean of campus, deputy registrar and all heads of departments (administrative and academic).

== Faculties and Departments ==
1. Applied Accounting
2. Financial Services
3. Business Administration and Entrepreneurship
4. Banking and Finance
5. Public Sector Management
6. Information System and Technology
7. Governance and Leadership
8. Leadership
9. procurement and logistics
10. Auditing, Taxation and Internal Controls

== Functions ==
The main functions of the institute include:

1. Offering courses leading to the award of certificates, diplomas and degrees of the University of Sierra Leone;
2. Designing and organizing management training courses and programmes for personnel in the public and private sectors and NGOs;
3. Organising conferences, workshops and seminars;
4. General management, financial management and banking, human resource management, procurement and logistic, public policy, organisational effectiveness and capacity building, basic office skills, entrepreneurship, marketing management and information technology;
5. Providing advisory and consultancy services on aspects of management, finance and administration;
6. Carrying out studies, enquiries and research in its areas of competence either independently or in collaboration with interested parties; and
7. Conducting tests and other evaluation exercises for both the public and private sector organisations.

8°29′6.41″N 13°13′54.09″W
