= Salima Monorma Bah =

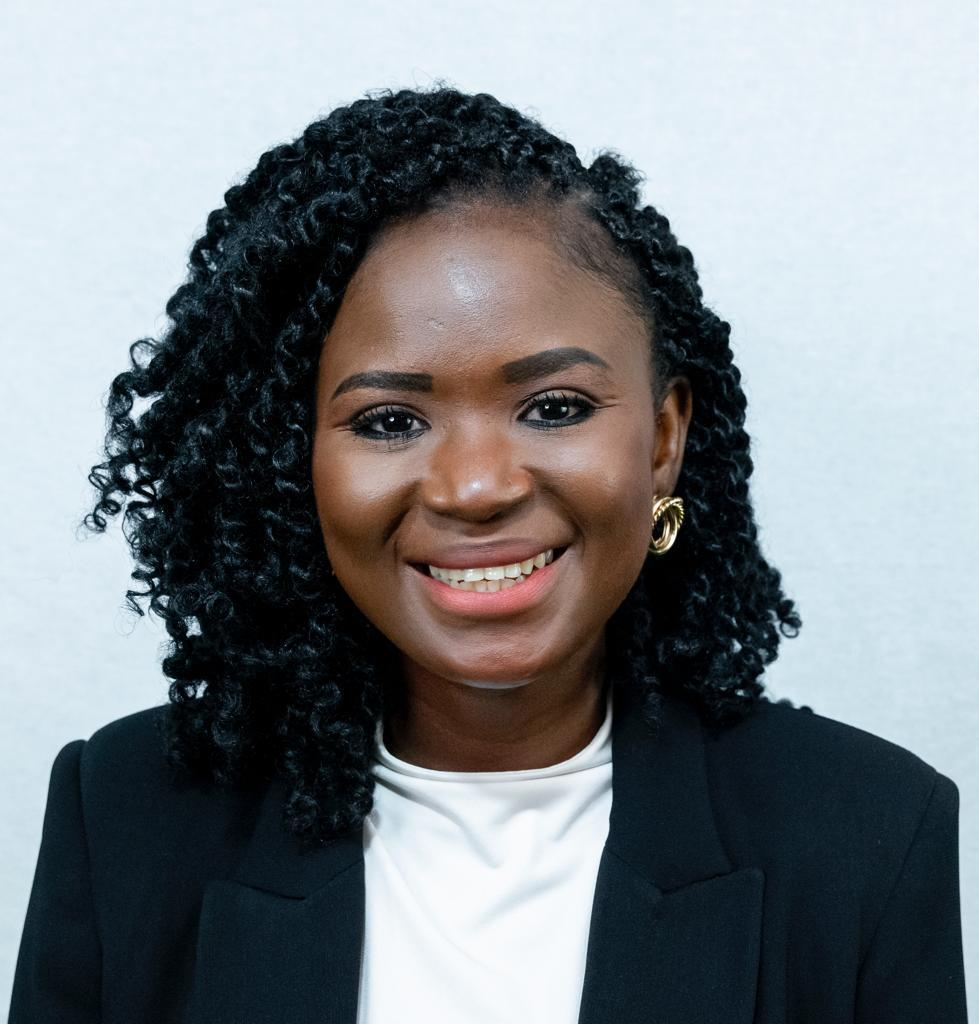
- Salima Monorma Bah, Minister of Communication, Technology and Innovation of Sierra Leone

Minister of Communication, Technology and Innovation of Sierra Leone
- In office 31 July 2023 – present
- President: Julius Maada Bio
- Preceded by: None (inaugural minister)

Personal details
- Born: Salima Monorma Bah; 1990 (age 35–36) Sierra Leone
- Party: Sierra Leone People's Party (SLPP)
- Education: University of Wales (Holborn College) (LLB, 2013); Columbia Law School (LL.M., 2023)
- Occupation: Politician; Barrister and Solicitor
- Known for: First Minister of Communication, Technology and Innovation of Sierra Leone; youngest cabinet minister at time of appointment

Haja Salima Monorma Bah is a Sierra Leonean politician and lawyer serving as the inaugural Minister of Communication, Technology and Innovation since 31 July 2023. Appointed by President Julius Maada Bio, she became the first person to head the newly created ministry and, at age 32, the youngest member of the cabinet at the time of her appointment.

== Early life and education ==
Bah pursued legal studies in the United Kingdom, earning a Bachelor of Laws (Honours) degree from the University of Wales (Holborn College) between 2011 and 2013. She subsequently enrolled at the Sierra Leone Law School, where she obtained her licence to practise as a Barrister and Solicitor of the High Court of Sierra Leone.

Concurrently with her ministerial appointment, she completed a Master of Laws (LL.M.) with Honours in Intellectual Property and Technology Law at Columbia Law School, New York, in 2023.

== Career ==
=== Legal career ===
Following her qualification, Bah was attached to the Prosecution Division of the Legal Department of the Ministry of Justice, where she gained experience in criminal prosecutions and the formulation of legal opinions. She later moved to the role of State Counsel at the Law Officers Department.

She is an active member of the Sierra Leone Bar Association and serves as an executive member of Lawyers for Women and Children, a non-profit organisation established to defend the rights of women and children.

=== Directorate of Science, Technology and Innovation (DSTI) ===
Bah was seconded from the Law Officers Department to the Directorate of Science, Technology and Innovation (DSTI) as Policy Lead and Head of Projects, where she led all UNICEF project portfolios. Working alongside software engineers, data scientists and product managers deepened her interest in technology policy, leading her to pursue advanced studies in the field.

=== Minister of Communication, Technology and Innovation ===
Bah was appointed Minister of Communication, Technology and Innovation by President Julius Maada Bio on 16 July 2023, and took the oath of office on 31 July 2023. She became the first person to lead the newly created ministry and the youngest cabinet minister in the government at the time of appointment.

Her ministerial mandate encompasses the government's digital transformation agenda, national digital economy strategy, innovation entrepreneurship development, and oversight of the telecommunications sector.

==== Digital infrastructure and connectivity ====
Under her tenure, the Sierra Leonean government and development partners committed over US$200 million in investments towards digital infrastructure, spanning connectivity, digital governance and innovation ecosystems. Notable achievements during this period include the introduction of Starlink satellite internet service and the launch of the first Stand-Alone 5G Open Access Network in West Africa.

Bah invested more than US$132 million in government programmes during her tenure, with internet access described as a central policy priority.

==== International engagement ====
Bah has represented Sierra Leone at numerous international forums, including:

- Co-presenting with the co-founder of the Giga initiative at the ITU SDG Digital Event to explore digital connectivity solutions for schools;
- Participating in the African Development Bank Digital Capacity Building Cooperation Programme in China;
- Joining ministers and technology leaders at the 2024 Digital Almaty forum in Kazakhstan to discuss digital public services;
- Signing a framework agreement with the Republic of Guinea Minister of Posts, Telecommunications and Digital Economy to enhance bilateral cooperation in telecommunications;
- Speaking at the DIGITAL@UNGA Anchor Event at United Nations Headquarters, New York, on connectivity and the Giga initiative (September 2025).

She also led a delegation to Nigeria for technology collaboration and was interviewed by Arise News Television and Channels Television in Nigeria.

== Recognition and awards ==
- TechCabal Builders' List (2025) — Named to the inaugural TechCabal Builders' List, which recognises individuals advancing Africa's technology ecosystem through measurable impact. Bah was selected following an editorial review of over 600 candidates from all 54 African countries, with selection based on demonstrable material change within the year.
- Most Influential People of African Descent (MIPAD) — Recognised by the Most Influential People of African Descent network.
- UNICEF Generation Unlimited Global Leadership Council — Serves as a member of the Global Leadership Council of the UNICEF Generation Unlimited partnership, which mobilises resources and leadership for youth empowerment.
