= St. Edward's Primary School =

Elementary school in Sierra Leone

Saint Edward's Primary School is an all-boys primary (elementary) school currently located at Fort Street in Freetown, Sierra Leone. Typically, it enrolls boys from ages 3 to 12. Its sister school is St. Joseph's Primary School.

It was founded in 1866 by Roman Catholic priests from Italy, France and Ireland, and originally situated at Rawdon Street, in the area where the Sacred Heart Cathedral and Santano House are now located. It is the oldest primary school in the country and one of the oldest elementary schools in Africa. In 1922, a secondary school was also established, which became known as St. Edward's Secondary School.

== House system ==
The school was originally divided into several houses, named after the priests who founded or attended the school.

Fitzgerald - [Red]
St. Edward's - [Blue]
Valentine - [Green]
Ganda - [Yellow]
Brosnahan - [Orange]
Browne - [Brown]

== Notable alumni ==
- Archbishop Joseph Ganda - first native Archbishop of Sierra Leone
- Ahmad Tejan Kabbah - former President of Sierra Leone
- Mohamed Kallon - Sierra Leonian soccer superstar
- Sir Albert Margai - second Prime Minister of Sierra Leone
- Charles Margai - Sierra Leonean lawyer and leader of the People's Movement for Democratic Change (PMDC)
