= Miss University Africa 2017 =

- Date: 2 December 2017 (8 years ago)
- Hosts: Soni Irabor
- Theme: Educating the girl child
- Venue: Obi Wali International Conference Center, Port Harcourt, Rivers State, Nigeria
- Broadcaster: AIT; DStv
- Entrants: 54
- Placements: 11
- Debuts: Comoros
- Winner: Lorriane Nadal; Mauritius

Miss University Africa 2017, the 5th edition of the Miss University Africa pageant, was held on 2 December 2017 at Obi Wali International Conference Center in Port Harcourt. Contestants from 54 African countries competed for the crown. The winner, Lorriane Nadal of Mauritius succeeded Rorisang Molefe of Lesotho, as the reigning Miss University Africa Queen. She was crowned by First Lady of Rivers State, Eberechi Wike at the end of the event.

== Results ==
Final Results	Contestant
Miss University Africa 2017	Mauritius – Lorriane Nadal
1st runner-up	Somalia – Phahima Kullow
2nd runner-up	Nigeria – Chinonso Opara
Top 11	Ethiopia – Misker Kassahun; São Tomé and Príncipe – Maria Andreza; Rwanda – Linda Umutoniwase; Gambia – Lawratou Camara; Tanzania – Nasreen Abdul; Eritrea – Aida Mebrahtu; Uganda – Jane Mulungi; Tunisia – Rahma Segni

== Contestants ==
The contestants from 54 African countries arrived Rivers State on 19 November 2017.

- Algeria – Djanet Metouri
- Angola – Maria Adao
- Benin – Ornela Do Marcolino
- Botswana – Olorato Lefenya
- Burkina Faso – Carine Yanogo
- Burundi – Ornella Gahimbare
- Cameroon – Blessing Obiora
- Cape Verde – Miriam Monteiro
- Comoros – Leila Tadjiri
- Democratic Republic of the Congo – Sarah Kuediaba
- Republic of the Congo – Solia Bamba
- Côte d’Ivoire – Esther Uha
- Djibouti – Fard York
- Egypt – Tahany Hassan
- Eritrea – Aida Mebrahtu
- Ethiopia – Misker Kassahun
- Gabon – Adama Larah
- Gambia – Lawratou Camara
- Ghana – Perpetual Acquah
- Guinea – Fatoumata Camara
- Guinea Bissau – Leontina Yonta Lacerda
- Kenya – Goretti Mirera
- Lesotho – Nthole Matela
- Liberia – Winnie Freeman
- Madagascar – Njara Windye
- Malawi – Epylen Chimasula
- Mali – Tahiratou BA
- Mauritania – Toubi Brown
- Mauritius – Lorriane Nadal
- Morocco – Ikram Bayaddou
- Mozambique – Liana Loforte
- Namibia – Fatima Shaningwa
- Niger – Miriam Abdou Saley
- Nigeria – Chinonso KimOprah Opara
- Rwanda – Linda Umutoniwase
- São Tomé and Príncipe – Maria Andreza
- Senegal – Charlotte Cisse
- Seychelles – Falaine Dora
- Sierra Leone – Enid Jones-Boston
- Somalia – Phahima Kullow
- South Africa – Tshiamo Moahloli
- South Sudan – Akuch Biar
- Sudan – Tasneem Tiana Adams
- Swaziland – Baby Mthimkhulu
- Tanzania – Nasreen Abdul
- Togo – Michelle Kuassi
- Tunisia – Rahma Segni
- Uganda – Jane Mulungi
- Zambia – Emmah Mwaba
- Zimbabwe – Maita K. Kainga

=== Debuts ===
- Comoros

== Judges ==
The performances of Miss University Africa 2017 contestants were evaluated by a panel of judges. Broadcaster and journalist Soni Irabor was the lead judge at the pageant, along with Mrs. Tolulope Nazzal, Executive Vice President- Miss University Africa Organization and a list of other judges.
