= Francis Heiser =

Francis Bernhard Heiser (died 14 December 1952) was a British Anglican priest who was principal of Fourah Bay College in Sierra Leone before becoming principal of St Aidan's Theological College in Birkenhead.

== Life ==
Heiser was educated at Jesus College, Oxford, graduating in 1906. After being ordained in 1907, he served as curate of St Luke's Church, Hampstead until 1914. He was then the incumbent of Christ Church, Madras until 1920. He was principal of Fourah Bay College in Sierra Leone from 1920 to 1922, before returning to England and becoming vice-principal of St Aidan's Theological College in Birkenhead in 1924. He was principal from 1929 to 1950, then became the vicar of St Margaret's Church in Collier Street, Kent. He was appointed an honorary canon of Chester Cathedral in 1942.
