= St. Edward's Secondary School =

Location
- May Park, Kingtom; Freetown; Sierra Leone

Information
- Type: Public School
- Motto: Dirige Nos In Veritate (Direct us in truth)
- Religious affiliation: Roman Catholic
- Established: 1922
- Founder: Rev. Father Edward Blanchet
- Head Masters - Upper and Lower Schools: Walter Davies ( Principlal Upper School) / Wilmot Johnson-Cole (Lower School)
- Gender: Boys
- Age: 13 to 18
- Houses: 5
- Former pupils: Old Edwardians
- Website: www.stedwardsschools.com

St Edward's Secondary School is a public Catholic secondary school in Freetown, Sierra Leone. While St. Edwards is designed to be an all-male school, female students are permitted to enroll as A Level candidates. It is affiliated with St. Edward's Primary School.

== History ==
St. Edward's origins began with St. Edward's Primary School which was established in 1865 by a French Roman Catholic priest, Rev. Father Edward Blanchet. In 1921, the board of directors, consisting of a group of priests from Italy, France and Ireland decided to start a secondary school. On February 6, 1922, the school made 7 graduates, them being Anthony Tucker, Sylvester Tucker, James Massallay, Edward Farrah, William Luke, Joseph Luke and Albert M. Margai who is the future prime minister of Sierra Leone. At the time, the secondary school was located at the same address as the primary school at Howe Street in Freetown. St. Edward's is the third oldest secondary school in Sierra Leone.

The first head master of St. Edward's was Father Michael O'Connor, but six months after the school opened, Father O'Connor retired due to illness and was replaced by Father Mulcahy. Under the leadership of Father Mulcahy, St. Edward's Secondary School became an academic institution which followed a British curriculum and enforced discipline by means of corporal punishment.

== Clubs and activities ==
The performing arts are debate, drama and music, the engineering clubs are STEM and Engineering, and the fitness related groups are the sports teams and the fitness club.

== Past headmasters ==
Past headmasters include:

- Rev. Father Michael O'Connor (1922)
- Rev. Father Mulcahy (1922-1956)
- Rev. Father Jeremiah O’Sullivan (1956-1979)
- Mr. A.J. Robinson (1979)
- Rev. Father Curran
- Rev. Father Hamelberg
- Mr. M.A.C. Renner
- Mr. J.P. Kamara (2000)

== Notable alumni ==
- George Banda-Thomas - former Minister of Political and Parliamentary Affairs in Sierra Leone
- Dr. Abass Bundu - former Executive Secretary of the Economic Community of West African States
- Archbishop Joseph Ganda - Archbishop Emeritus of Freetown and Bo
- Cyril Patrick Foray - Sierra Leone's former Minister of External Affairs
- Henry M. Joko-Smart - former Commissioner of Sierra Leone's Anti-Corruption Commission and former Chairman the Supreme Court
- Ahmad Tejan Kabbah - former President of Sierra Leone
- Mohamed Kallon - professional football player
- Sir Albert Margai - second Prime Minister of Sierra Leone
- Tinga Seisay - former Consul General to the United States and pro-democracy advocate
- Dr. Kadi Sesay - feminist, pro-democracy advocate and Minister of Trade and Industry in Sierra Leone
