= Robert Benjamin Ageh Wellesley Cole =

Sierra Leonean medical doctor and writer (1907–1995)

Robert Benjamin Ageh Wellesley Cole MRCS, FRCS FRCSEd
- Born: Robert Benjamin Ageh Wellesley Cole; 7 March 1907; Freetown, Sierra Leone Colony
- Died: 31 October 1995 (aged 88); Marylebone, Sierra Leone
- Education: Government Model School; CMS Grammar School; Fourah Bay College; University of London (B.A. (Hons)); Newcastle University; Durham University (B.A., M.B.B.S., M.D.)
- Occupation: Surgeon
- Children: 4
- Relatives: Irene Ighodaro (sister); Samuel O. Ighodaro (brother-in-law)
- Writing career
- Language: English

Robert Benjamin Ageh Wellesley Cole (11 March 1907 – 31 October 1995), was a Sierra Leonean surgeon and writer who was the first West African to become a Fellow of the Royal College of Surgeons of England.

== Background and early life ==
Robert Benjamin Ageh Wellesley Cole was born at No. 15 Pownall Street, Freetown, Sierra Leone (then a colony of the United Kingdom), to Wilfred Sydney Ageh Wellesley Cole and his wife, Elizabeth Cole (née Okrafo-Smart). The Wellesley-Cole family had three other children including Dr. Irene Ighodaro.

The Wellesley-Coles were a Sierra Leone Creole family of partial Caribbean origin who also descended from Wolof and Yoruba Liberated African ancestors. The Okrafo-Smart family was another prominent Creole family largely of Igbo Liberated African descent. His Yoruba great-grandfather, a Liberated African, who had escaped from slave traders in Nigeria and settled in Freetown, adopted the surname of Wellesley out of deep admiration for the Arthur Wellesley, 1st Duke of Wellington.

Wilfred Cole was a successful civil engineer who was the first Sierra Leonean to serve as a superintendent for the Public Water Works Department in Freetown. The Wellesley-Cole family was a middle-class family, and Robert Wellesley-Cole grew up in a household of relative comfort and privilege.

== Early education ==
Wellesley-Cole was educated at the Government Model School in Freetown, Sierra Leone where he was taught by teachers such as William Campbell. Following the completion of his primary education, Wellesley-Cole was enrolled as the first student of the Government Model Secondary School in 1914, currently known as Prince of Wales Secondary School. Wellesley-Cole completed his studies at Prince of Wales, proceeded to the CMS Grammar School currently known as The Sierra Leone Grammar School in 1918 where he eventually became Head Prefect (Head Boy) in his final year and passed the Cambridge Entrance Certification in 1925.

== Academic career ==
Wellesley-Cole studied mathematics at Fourah Bay College, whose parent institution was Durham University at the time. He graduated with a bachelor's degree from Fourah Bay in 1926 before becoming an assistant lecturer of mathematics at the college in 1927. In 1928, he obtained an external BA degree upper-second class honours in philosophy at the University of London and then proceeded to attend Newcastle-upon-Tyne Medical School, then constituent school of the Durham University. In 1934, he received multiple academic prizes upon his graduation from medical school with an M.B.B.S. with first class honours.

== Medical career ==
After medical school, he was a House Officer at the Royal Victoria Infirmary in Newcastle where one of his instructors was the English surgeon, Grey Turner. During World War II, he volunteered for enlistment but was ultimately not enlisted.

Wellesley-Cole was the first West African to become a Member of the Royal College of Surgeons of England. In 1943 he obtained a Doctorate in Medicine from Durham and was elected a Fellow of the Royal Society of Medicine.

He passed the Master of Surgery examination, M.S. in 1944. He was elected a Fellow of the Royal College of Surgeons of Edinburgh in October 1944 and overcoming institutional barriers, he became the first African and the first black person to be elected a Fellow of Royal College of Surgeons of England. He opened a private Genera Practice in Newcastle and concurrently served on Colonial Office advisory committees dedicated to medical education and social services in West Africa. He toured Anglophone West Africa (Gambia, Sierra Leone, the Gold Coast and Nigeria) during March to September 1945, as a member of the Colonial Office Advisory Committee for the Welfare of Colonial Peoples.

After the NHS was established in 1948, he opted for a career in surgery and passed his examinations in ophthalmology in 1950 and obtained a Diploma in Ophthalmic Medicine and Surgery (DOMS). He then moved his General Practice to Nottingham.

Due to discrimination in the West African Medical Service, Wellesley-Cole mainly practised in the United Kingdom, although he did also practice in Ibadan, Nigeria, and in his natal homeland of Sierra Leone. In 1961, he was appointed by the Nigerian Civil Service as a senior surgical specialist consultant in Western Nigeria.

Following Sierra Leone's Independence on 27 April 1961, then Prime Minister Milton Margai offered Wellesley-Cole the position of senior medical officer and in 1964, he became a Consultant Surgeon of the Government of Sierra Leone. In 1971, he became the Director of Clinical Studies in Sierra Leone. Wellesley Cole lost his British nationality status and by extension, his British passport which was eventually restored in 1981/82. He was however able to return to England in 1974. He had earlier been invited to become a Justice of the Peace in 1961, the first time this invitation had been extended to a black African in Britain.

== Activism ==
Wellesley-Cole co-founded the Society for the Cultural Advancement of Africa, with his sister Irene in 1943.

He was President of the League of Coloured Peoples from 1947 to 1949, following the death of the organisation's founder Dr Harold Moody.

He was a Director of the West African Students Union and a founder member of the West African Society and an editor of the society's journal Africana, as well as a member of the Fabian Society. He also founded a literary club in his hometown, Freetown.

== Family life ==
In 1932, Wellesley-Cole married Anna Brodie, his Scottish former landlady. The marriage was later dissolved.

In 1950, he married Amy Manto Bondfield Hotobah-During, a Sierra Leone Creole nurse who was the younger sister of Dr Raymond Sarif Easmon and Bertha Conton and the couple had four children. One of his daughters, Patrice Suzanne, read law at Oxford. He later married Anjuma Josephine Elizabeth Wyse in 1980.

== Publications ==
- Kossoh Town Boy (Cambridge: Cambridge University Press, 1960)
- An Innocent in Britain, or, The Missing Link: a documented autobiography (United Kingdom: Campbell Matthews, 1988)
- Kossoh Town Boy: A Time Capsule of Pre Independence Sierra Leone (Sierra Leone: Koroma Kamanda, 2017)
