= Mariatu Candé =

Bissau-Guinean footballer (born 1991)

Personal information
- Date of birth: 28 October 1991 (age 35)
- Place of birth: Bolama, Guinea-Bissau
- Positions: Left-back; forward

Team information
- Current team: Mundo Futuro
- Number: 5

Senior career*
Years	Team	Apps	(Gls)
–2007	Mavegro FC		
2007–2010	Guinée Maintenance Force		
2010–2013	FC Planet		
2014–	Mundo Futuro		

International career^{‡}
2006	Guinea-Bissau	2	(?)
- * Club domestic league appearances and goals ‡ National team caps and goals as of 12 November 2006

Mariatu Candé (born 28 October 1991) is a Bissau-Guinean footballer who plays as a left back for Bolivian club Mundo Futuro. She has been a member of the Guinea-Bissau women's national team.

== Club career ==
Candé played in France.

== International career ==
Candé played for Guinea-Bissau at senior level in the 2008 CAF Women's Olympic Qualifying Tournament.
