= Mariatu Bala Usman =

Nigerian health commissioner

Ministry of Health
- Incumbent
- Assumed office 2015
- Governor: Aminu Bello Masari

Personal details
- Born: Katsina State

Mariatu Bala Usman is the commissioner for Ministry of Health, Katsina State. She is part of the Executive Council of Katsina State.

== Career ==
As commissioner of Health for Katsina State, Mariatu scheduled plans to eradicate meningitis that was first found on January 17, 2018, in the Bugaje ward of the Jibia local government area. She sent a squad to investigate and to give treatment, drugs and health education as a preventive measures. Mariatu highlighted that Katsina people had to travel for an hour to access healthcare in the paper titled 'Challenges facing health care delivery in Katsina State and the way forward'.
