= Fatmata Turay =

Sierra Leonean doctor and model (born 1987)

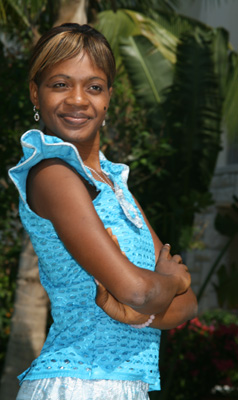
- Born: Fatmata B. Turay

Fatmata B. Turay, (born in 1987 in Freetown) is a Sierra Leonean doctor and beauty pageant titleholder, who represented her country at Miss World 2007 in Sanya, China. She studied medicine.
