= Amputees and War Wounded Association =

Disability organization in Sierra Leone

The Amputees and War Wounded Association (AWWA) is a self-help organization based in Murray Town, Sierra Leone. Founded in 2002 by war victim Alhaji Lamin Jusu Jarka, the aim of the organization is to support the victims of the civil war, specifically those that had the forced Amputation or were otherwise wounded in the conflict, and lobby the government on their behalf.
