= Annie Walsh Memorial School =

Secondary school in Sierra Leone

Information
- Established: 1849; 177 years ago
- Gender: Girls

The Annie Walsh Memorial School is an all-girls secondary school in Freetown, Sierra Leone. It was established in 1849 in Charlotte, a newly established village for recaptives.

== Notable alumni ==
- Zainab Bangura: Foreign Minister of Sierra Leone, and founder of Campaign for Good Governance
- Hannah Benka-Coker: educator; founder of Freetown Secondary School for Girls (FSSG) in 1926
- Sarah Forbes Bonetta: African Princess and Queen Victoria's (England) goddaughter
- Mabel Dove: Journalist and first female MP in Africa
- Irene Ighodaro: first female medical doctor in West Africa
- Sia Koroma: First Lady of Sierra Leone
- Nemata Majeks-Walker, women's rights activist
- Lati Hyde-Forster: first female graduate of Fourah Bay College,
- Yema Lucilda Hunter, née Caulker: author and retired WHO Librarian
- Jeillo Edwards: actress
- Stella Thomas: lawyer
- Nkechi Agwu: mathematician
- Chidi Blyden: foreign policy advisor

== See also ==
- Sarah Hartwig (missionary)
