= Miss University Africa =

International beauty pageant

- Abbreviation: MUA
- Formation: 2010; 16 years ago
- Type: Beauty pageant
- Key people: Taylor Nazzal (President)
- Website: http://www.missuniversityafrica.org

Miss University Africa (MUA) is an annual international beauty pageant organized by Visions, Innovations and Concepts. The pageant was first held in 2010. Unlike Miss America and Miss Earth pageants, Miss University Africa contestants are not required to compete in swimsuits or bikinis. Founded by businessman Taylor Nazzal, the competition has 54 contestants who represent 54 countries in Africa, and the winner of the pageant receives US$50,000 in endorsement deals, a new car and becomes a United Nations Students' Ambassador.

The current title holder is Adar Yusuf Ibrahim from Somalia who was crowned on December 18, 2021, in Abuja, Nigeria.

== Requirements ==
The pageant allows the participation of female contestants between the ages of 18 and 26 who are active university students with no marriage experience or children.

== Titleholders ==
Edition	Pageants		Venues		Entrants
Edition	Country	Miss Africa	City	Country	Entrants
2010	Nigeria	Powede Lawrence	Yenagoa	Nigeria	25
2011	Togo	Christina Koagni	Yenagoa	Nigeria	46
2012	Lesotho	Rorisang Molefe	Edo State	Nigeria	48
Pageant was not held 2013-2016
2017	Mauritius	Lorriane Nadal	Port Harcourt	Nigeria	48
2018	Mozambique	Marlise Sacur	Owerri	Nigeria	51
Pageant was not held 2019-2020
2021	Somalia	Adar Yusuf Ibrahim	Abuja	Nigeria	45

== Countries by number of title wins ==
Country	Titles	Year(s)
Somalia	1	2021
Mozambique	1	2018
Mauritius	1	2017
Lesotho	1	2012
Togo	1	2011
Nigeria	1	2010

== See also ==
- List of beauty pageants
