= Murray Town, Sierra Leone =

Coordinates: 8°30′N 13°16′W

Murray Town is a neighbourhood in the West End of Sierra Leone's capital Freetown. The Amputees and War Wounded Association is based here arising from the local camp for such people. The Sierra Leone Grammar School is also located here. Murray Town contains many colonial style board houses dating back to the turn of the 20th century.

== History ==
Murray Town was founded in April 1829 to provide accommodation for liberated enslaved Africans, who had been brought to Freetown by the British Royal Navy West Africa Squadron. It originally housed three hundred and twenty six liberated Africans, under the management of a former African soldier of the Royal African Corps. It was constructed as four wide streets.

== Famous people ==
- Thomas Leighton Decker, linguist, poet and Krio language revisionist.
