= Fourah Bay College =

University in Freetown, Sierra-Leone

- Type: Public
- Established: February 18, 1827; 199 years ago
- Affiliations: University of Sierra Leone
- Students: 3,465 total
- Location: Mount Aureol, Freetown, Sierra Leone; 8°28′37.9″N 13°13′16.3″W
- Campus: Freetown campus (urban)
- Language: English
- Website: fourahbaycollege.net

Fourah Bay College is a public university in the neighbourhood of Mount Aureol in Freetown, Sierra Leone. Founded on 18 February 1827, it is the first Western-style university built in Sub-Saharan Africa and, furthermore, the first university-level institution in Africa. It is a constituent college of the University of Sierra Leone (USL) and was formerly affiliated with Durham University (1876–1967).

== History ==
=== Foundation ===
The college was established in February 1827 as an Anglican missionary school by the Church Missionary Society with support from Charles MacCarthy, the governor of Sierra Leone. Samuel Ajayi Crowther was the first student to be enrolled at Fourah Bay. Fourah Bay College soon became a magnet for Sierra Leone Creoles and other Africans seeking higher education in British West Africa. These included Nigerians, Ghanaians, Ivorians and many more, especially in the fields of theology and education. It was the first western-style university in West Africa. Under colonialism, Freetown was known as the "Athens of Africa" due to the large number of excellent schools in Freetown and surrounding areas.

The first black principal of the university was an African-American missionary, Reverend Edward Jones from South Carolina, United States. Lamina Sankoh was a prominent early academic; Francis Heiser was principal from 1920 to 1922. Davidson Nicol was the first Sierra Leonean principal in 1966. In 1985 unrest broke out in Fourah Bay College following a purge of those suspected of militancy inspired by Gaddafi's Green Book, and retaliatory violence and arrests ensued.

=== Old Fourah Bay College Building ===
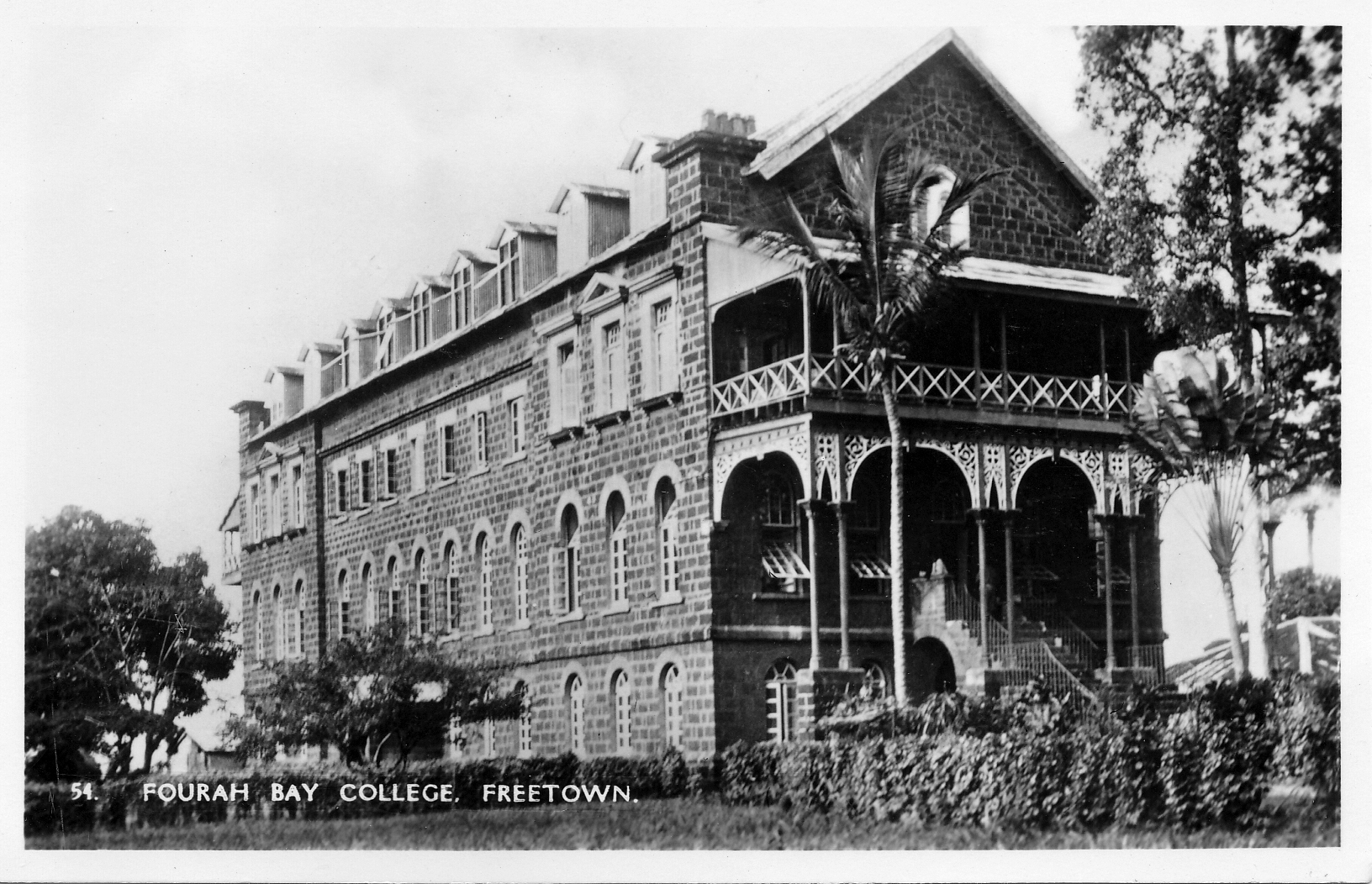
Fourah Bay College (Old building, 1930s)

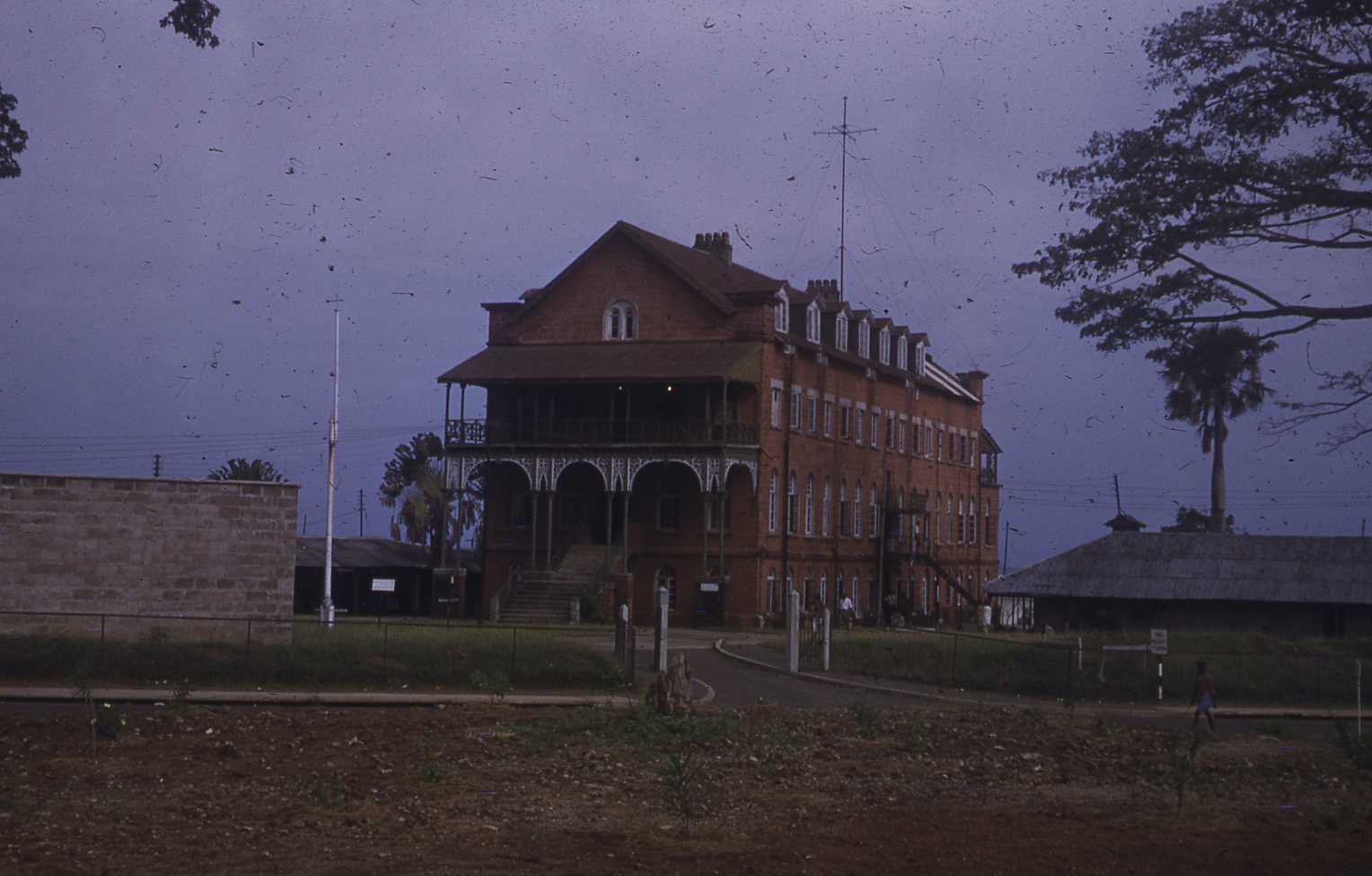
The old building of Fourah Bay College

Governor William Fergusson laid the foundation stone of the original Fourah Bay College building when construction started in 1845, with construction supervised by Edward Jones, who became the institution's first principal. The original Fourah Bay College building remained in regular use until World War II when the college was temporarily moved outside Freetown. After the war it became the headquarters of Sierra Leone Government Railway and later as a Magistrate court. The building was proclaimed a National Monument in 1955. The building ceased to be in use in early 1990, and caught fire in 1999.

== Administration ==
=== Faculties ===
- Faculty of Arts
- Faculty of Engineering
- Faculty of Pure and Applied Sciences
- Faculty of Social Sciences
- Faculty of Law
- Faculty of Applied Accounting

=== Institute of African Studies ===
Work began on the building of the Institute of African Studies in 1966 with half the £40,000 being provided by the UK Technical Assistance Programme. The first director was Michael Crowder with J. G. Edowu-Hyde as secretary. The journal Sierra Leone Studies was also relaunched at this time.

== Students ==
As of 1998/1999, the student enrollment was around 2,000 in four faculties and five institutes. It had consistently expanded in the 10 previous years.

=== Notable alumni ===
See also Category:Fourah Bay College alumni

- Samuel Ajayi Crowther, one-time Anglican bishop of West Africa and first graduate of Fourah Bay College
- Lati Hyde-Forster, first African principal of Annie Walsh Memorial School and first female graduate of Fourah Bay College
- Sir Ernest Dunstan Morgan, pharmaceutical entrepreneur and philanthropist
- Sir Samuel Bankole-Jones (1911– 1981), former chief justice and first Sierra Leonean president of the Court of Appeal
- Sir Salako Benka-Coker (1900–1965), first Sierra Leonean chief justice of the Supreme Court
- Sir Ernest Beoku-Betts (1895–1957), jurist and one-time mayor of Freetown
- Sir Henry Lightfoot Boston (1898–1969), first African Governor-General of Sierra Leone
- Sir Samuel Lewis (1843–1903), first mayor of Freetown and first West African to receive a knighthood
- Sir Emile Fashole-Luke (1895–1980), former chief justice and Speaker of Parliament
- Yvonne Aki-Sawyerr, economist and current mayor of Freetown
- Thomas Decker, writer, poet, journalist, and linguist
- Henry Rawlingson Carr, educator and administrator
- Christian Frederick Cole, first black graduate of Oxford and first African barrister to practice in the English courts
- Enid Ayodele Forde (born 1932), geospatial analyst, chair of the geography department at Fourah Bay College and first Sierra Leonean woman to gain a PhD
- Harry Alphonso Sawyerr (1909–1986), writer and Anglican theologian
- Hillary Sao Kanu, commissioner of Police of the African Union Transition Mission in Somalia (ATMIS)
- Ade Renner Thomas (born 1945), barrister and one-time Chief Justice of Sierra Leone
- Michael Adekunle Ajasin
- Edward Fasholé-Luke (born 1934) academic and Anglican theologian
- David Omashola Carew, economist and former cabinet minister
- Victor Chukuma Johnson (1944–2012), former chairman and deputy leader of the All People's Congress
- Robert Wellesley Cole, general surgeon and first West African to become a Fellow of the Royal College of Surgeons
- Henry Olufemi Macauley (born 1962), businessman with expertise in the oil industries and former minister of energy
- Violet Showers Johnson, professor of history and director of Africana studies at Texas A&M University
- Clifford Nelson Fyle, academic and author, known for writing the lyrics to the Sierra Leone National Anthem
- Thomas Josiah Thompson (1867–1941), lawyer, one-time mayor of Freetown and newspaper proprietor.
- Gershon Beresford Collier (1927–1994), former chief justice of Sierra Leone, educator and diplomat
- Samuel Benjamin Thomas (1833– 1901), philanthropist, entrepreneur and one of the richest men in 19th-century Africa.
- Sam Franklyn Gibson, former mayor of Freetown.
- Kelvin Anderson
- J. E. Casely Hayford
- Africanus Horton, surgeon, scientist and political thinker who worked towards African independence a century before it occurred
- Thomas Horatio Jackson
- Desmond Finney, actor and nominee for the Zafaa Global Film Awards
- James Ayodele Jenkins-Johnston, barrister and human rights defender
- Edward Wilmot Blyden III (1918–2010), political scientist and former dean at Fourah Bay College
- Abel Bankole Stronge, lawyer and one-time Speaker of the Parliament of Sierra Leone
- John Bankole Thompson (1936–2021), jurist, judge and academic
- Akintola Gustavus Wyse (died 2002), author and professor of history at Fourah Bay College
- Moses Nathanael Scott (1911–1988), clergyman and Anglican Bishop of Sierra Leone who later became Archbishop of the Province of West Africa
- Obadiah Johnson
- Kenneth Dike, vice-chancellor of the University of Ibadan
- Thomas Sylvester Johnson (1873–1955), educator, theologian and former bishop of Sierra Leone
- Eldred Durosimi Jones (1925–2020), linguist, literary critic, university professor and principal of Fourah Bay College
- Arthur Daniel Porter III (1924–2019), author, professor of history and university administrator
- Alexander Babatunde Akinyele
- Zainab Bangura
- Kojo Botsio
- J. B. Dauda, foreign minister
- M. G. Ejaife
- David J. Francis
- Ibrahim Fofanah, Footballer
- Ella Koblo Gulama
- Abu Bakarr Kanu, Professor of Chemistry at the Winston-Salem State University
- John Karefa-Smart
- Fatou Sanyang Kinteh
- Ernest Bai Koroma, President of Sierra Leone
- Sia Koroma, first lady
- Tamba Lamina, Sierra Leonean cabinet minister
- Sir Milton Margai
- Sam Mbakwe
- Benjamin Quartey-Papafio
- Frederick Poku Sarkodee, one of the three Ghanaian High Court judges that were martyred on June 30, 1982.
- Kadi Sesay
- Shekou Touray, Permanent Representative of Sierra Leone to the United Nations
- Eugenia Kargbo, heat officer
