= University of Sierra Leone =

Public university in Freetown, Sierra Leone

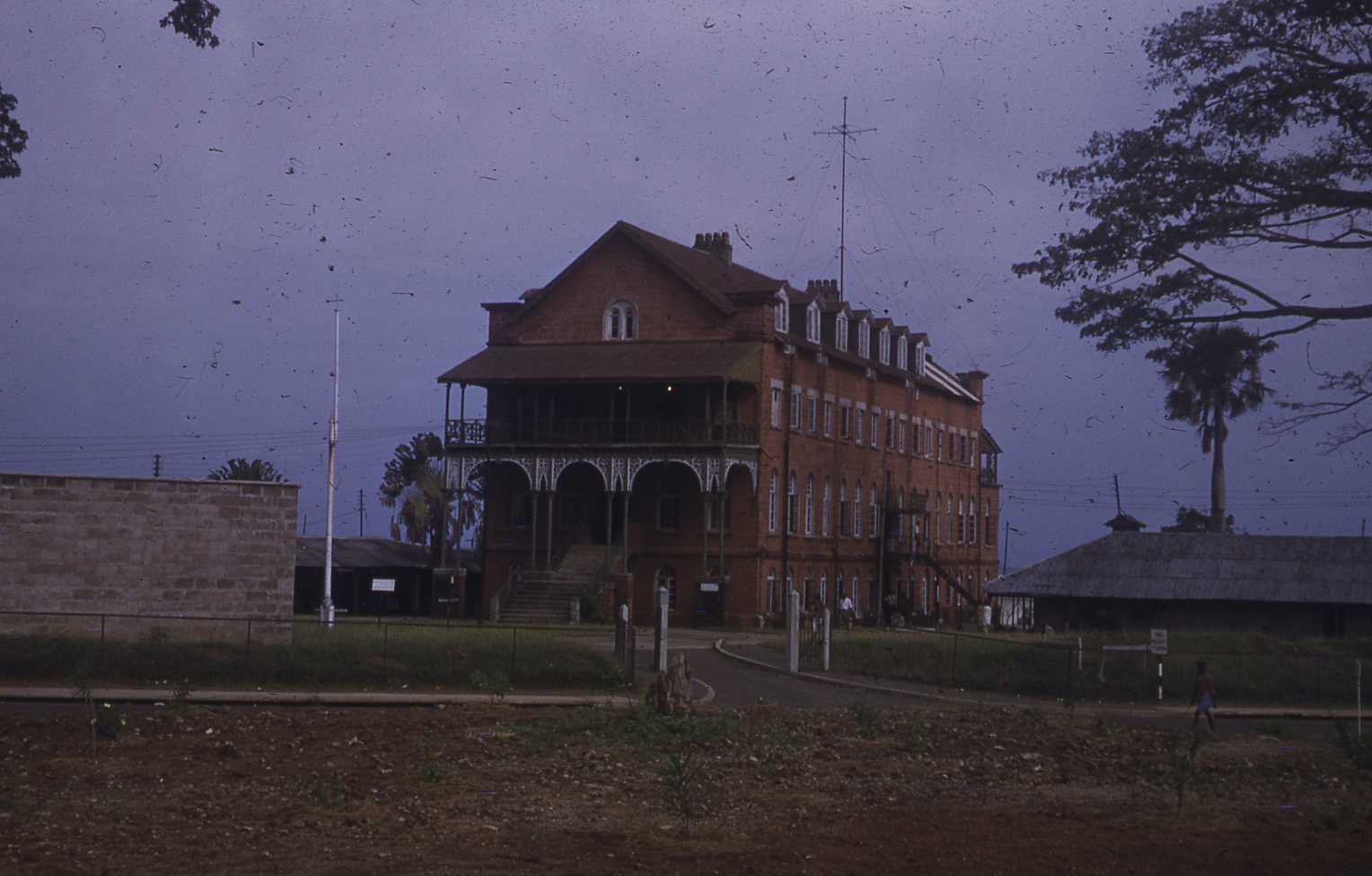
- The old building of Fourah Bay College. Cline Town, Freetown, Sierra Leone. Year unknown.
- Type: Public
- Established: February 1827
- Affiliations: Fourah Bay College and Njala University college
- Location: Freetown, Sierra Leone
- Campus: Urban
- Nickname: USL
- Website: University website

The University of Sierra Leone is a public university in Freetown, Sierra Leone. Established in February 1827, it is the oldest university in Africa. As of May 2005, the University of Sierra Leone was reconstituted into the individual colleges of Fourah Bay College and Njala University college.

== History ==
The university had its origins in the Fourah Bay College, which was established as an Anglican missionary school by the Church Missionary Society with support from Charles MacCarthy, the governor of Sierra Leone. Samuel Ajayi Crowther was the first student to enroll at Fouray Bay. Fourah Bay College soon became a magnet for Krio and other Africans seeking higher education in British West Africa. These included Nigerians, Ghanaians, Ivorians, and many more, especially in the fields of theology and education. It was the first western-style university in West Africa. Under colonialism, Freetown was known as "the Athens of West Africa" as an homage to the college.
