= Stella Thomas =

Yoruba Nigerian lawyer

- Born: Stella Jane Thomas; 1906; Lagos, Nigeria
- Died: 1974 (aged 68)
- Other names: Stella Marke
- Occupations: Lawyer, magistrate
- Years active: 1933–1974
- Known for: First woman magistrate of Nigeria

Stella Jane Thomas (later Stella Marke; 1906–1974) was a Yoruba Nigerian lawyer of Sierra Leone Creole descent. She received a law degree from Oxford University and in 1943 became the first woman magistrate in Nigeria.

== Early life and education ==
Stella Thomas was born in 1906, in Lagos, Nigeria, the daughter of Peter John Claudius Thomas, a Sierra Leone Creole businessman based in Lagos. Her father was the first African to head the Lagos Chamber of Commerce. She attended the Annie Walsh Memorial School in Freetown, Sierra Leone, "the oldest secondary school for girls in West Africa". Her brother Peter Thomas became the first West African pilot commissioned in the Royal Air Force during World War II. Another brother, Stephen Peter Thomas, was the first Chief Justice of the Mid-West region.

While she studied law at Oxford and was a member of the Middle Temple in London, she was active with the West African Students Union, and a founding member of the League of Coloured Peoples, organized by Harold Moody. She lived in Bloomsbury, and starred in a production of Jamaican poet Una Marson's first play, At What a Price, put on by the league at London's Scala Theatre, featuring mostly London students in an all-Black cast.

== Career ==
Thomas was the first black African woman called to the bar in Great Britain, in 1933. In 1934, she was the only African woman to participate in a discussion with Margery Perham at the Royal Society of Arts, and she took the opportunity to criticize Lord Lugard and African colonialism before an influential audience. When she returned to West Africa, she was the first woman lawyer in the region.

Upon her return to West Africa, she initially enrolled at the Sierra Leonean bar and in December 1935, she went back to Lagos and set up a law practice along Kakawa Street, Lagos Island. She worked on a wide range of legal matters, including criminal cases and family issues, and also worked with lawyers Alex E. J. Taylor and Eric Moore.

In 1943, she became West Africa's first woman magistrate, serving Ikeja magistrate court with jurisdiction for Mushin, Agege and Ikorodu districts. She later was a magistrate at the Saint Anna Court house and the Botanical Gardens Court in Ebute-Metta. She retired as a magistrate in Sierra Leone in 1971.

== Personal life ==
In November 1944, Stella Thomas married a fellow legal professional, Richard Bright Marke, in Freetown. She died in 1974, aged 68.

== See also ==
- First women lawyers around the world
