= Death of Milton King =

1951 police killing that sparked international anti-apartheid protests

Milton King (d. March 4 or 5, 1951) was a Barbadian seaman who was beaten and killed by South African police in March 1951 after he intervened on behalf of Coloured patrons being harassed by two police officers in a café in Cape Town. King was arrested and died within the next two days, likely from a brain haemorrhage that occurred after a severe beating fractured his skull. One of the two policemen who arrested King, Johannes Visser, was charged with culpable homicide and put on trial, while the other, Constable J. Groenewald, was interrogated. The homicide trial magistrate ruled that since it could not be determined which of the two men struck the ultimately-fatal blow, neither could be found guilty of any serious charge. The only publicly-known punishment resulting from the King trial was Visser being fined £10 (equivalent to £273 in 2025).

King's murder and his killers' light sentences made international headlines, mostly in the Caribbean and the United Kingdom. Reactions including protest meetings, rallies, marches, and boycotts took place in the British Isles, Barbados, British Guiana, Grenada, St. Kitts and Nevis, and other parts of the Lesser Antilles, often led by labour unions and civil rights organisations. According to some historians, these protests and boycotts were one of the origins of the international anti-apartheid movement. In 1959, fellow Caribbean nation Jamaica became the first country in the world to impose broad government economic sanctions against apartheid South Africa since India in 1946. Trade ministers in Barbados, alongside those of three other British colonies in the West Indies, threatened to follow suit, though they later backed down.

== Context ==
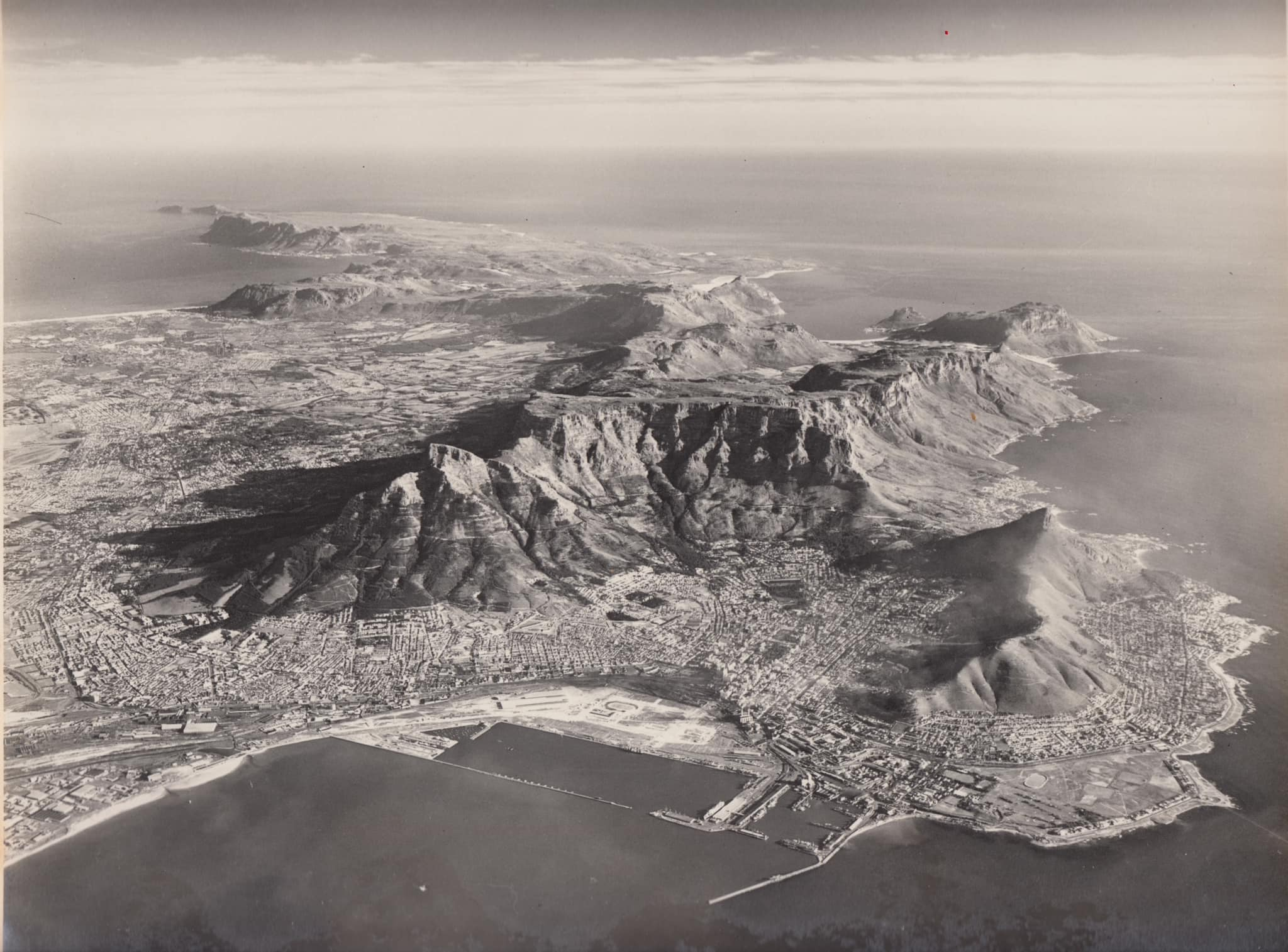
Cape Town seen from the air in 1946, with the harbour at the bottom and District Six near the bottom-left.

Milton King was a Barbadian man who worked as a second steward aboard SS Strategist, a steamship owned by the Harrison Line. In March 1951, the Strategist had been sailing between the United Kingdom and the Union of South Africa when she docked in Cape Town for four days.

In 1951, the Union of South Africa and Cape Town in particular were in the midst of complex economic and social changes. Three years prior, D. F. Malan's National Party had gained control of the national government by winning a general election in which white racial anxieties were a key issue. Once in power, the National Party quickly began implementing apartheid (Afrikaans for "apartness"), a policy of institutionalised racial segregation and discrimination against nonwhites. Although legally-sanctioned racial discrimination was widely practised before 1948, apartheid policies reinforced and expanded these structures. Examples include the Population Registration Act of 1950, which classified all South Africans as "Bantu", "Coloured" (used to describe a wide range of multiethnic communities), or "White" ("Asian" would be added later), and the Group Areas Act of 1950, which began spatially segregating South Africa and would lead to the forced removals of nonwhite populations from many towns and neighbourhoods. Anti-apartheid resistance events inside South Africa were limited but growing in scope by the early 1950s, with a 1950 May Day strike seeing 80% of the Rand's mining workforce walk off the job despite the threat of police violence.

Cape Town's racial politics and tensions in the mid-20th century were somewhat distinct from those of the rest of South Africa. This was due in part to Cape Town's unique racial demographics, with neighbourhoods like District Six home to a cosmopolitan but plurality-Coloured population following World War II. Another key element was the Cape Qualified Franchise, a system within the former Cape Colony where men of any race could vote in parliamentary elections, as long as they met property and literacy qualifications. Although the effects of the Cape franchise had been somewhat diluted (by expanding voting rights to more white women and more landless white men, for example), Coloured communities in the Cape in 1950 still represented an important group of swing voters that could theoretically tip the scales in a contest between the National Party and pro-coloured opposition United Party. Malan spoke to the national Parliament in 1949, suggesting that Coloured voters were broadly immature, easily tricked, and readily accepting of bribes. His National Party would eventually attempt to gut the Cape franchise in 1951, sparking the Coloured vote constitutional crisis including mass protests on March 9 (mere days after King's death) and a general strike among coloured workers in April. Despite this internal resistance, the National Party succeeded in passing the Separate Representation of Voters Act in June, largely eliminating the Cape franchise in national general elections.

The social connotations of 'colouredness' in South Africa and in the Caribbean have historically differed somewhat. King would likely have been perceived as Coloured in Cape Town, and later news reports in South Africa described King as "Coloured".

== Arrest and death ==
On March 3, 1951, King went ashore in Cape Town, accompanied by fellow West Indian crew members Hilton Browne and Wilfred Browne. According to the Brownes' court testimony, King had one brandy that evening, and the three men then went to a "café for non-Europeans" in District Six. (Note: Some sources place the café on Dock Road.) Some time later, two Cape Town police officers in plainclothes attire entered the café: Johannes Stephanus Hoch Visser, aged 20; and a Constable named J. J. Groenewald, age unknown. The Brownes testified that the two policemen kicked a chair out from under a coloured man; when King (at that point sober) intervened, one of the policemen hit him and a scuffle began. Constable Groenewald later testified that Visser had kicked the chair of the coloured man, named Adams, and slapped him as well. Groenewald's story, which pinned almost all wrongdoing onto Visser, was questioned even by the presiding magistrate during the trial.

According to Constable Groenewald's later testimony, Visser arrested King in the café on a charge of 'using obscene language'. The Brownes were ordered to leave the café and later saw King, sober and walking unassisted, being escorted out of the building by the two policemen. In Groenewald's retelling of the events, the three were walking on Albertus Street when Visser hit King in the head with the side of his arm. King fell down, moaning and unable to stand up, and the back of his head had a visible bump. Per Groenewald, "Visser then said he was due to go on leave and I should lock King up on a charge of drunkenness: King's breath smelt of liquor. This was the first mention of drunkenness." Groenewald, Visser, and potentially another constable carried an unconscious King to a police station and charged him as such. Sergeant A. V. Hoffman later testified that he had examined King around that time and found no visible injuries. Hoffman concluded that King was unconscious due to drunkenness but did not smell of liquor.

The purser for the Strategist, William Rowntree, went to the station that night to bail King out, but found him in the courtyard outside the cells, unconscious with a beaten-up face and a bruised eye. Rowntree refused to post King's bail, later explaining he could not accept the responsibility; Rowntree left the station after a sergeant assured him King would be sent to a hospital. Another constable visited King hourly throughout the night and later reported noticing 'nothing remarkable'.

In the morning, King was still unconscious, but the district surgeon examined him and said he was simply under the influence. Sergeant H. G. Kruger, on duty at the cells that day, tried twice to get the surgeon's permission to send him to the hospital; Kruger was denied both times and eventually did it anyway despite contravening policy.

King died within the next two days, most likely on March 5. A pathologist for the local government conducted a post-mortem examination of King's body on March 5 and concluded he died from a brain haemorrhage associated with a broken skull. The pathologist later stated that if King's fractured skull had been properly diagnosed earlier, his odds of survival would have been around 50 percent.

== Investigations ==
In Barbados, the colonial Government first heard of King's death on March 31 and subsequently began its own investigation, focused on bringing the killers to justice and on providing adequate compensation to King's children. The House of Assembly was told by Ernest Deighton Mottley on May 15 that the Governor of Barbados, Alfred Savage, was informed about the incident and was urged to take the matter up with the Secretary of State for the Colonies. On May 22, Hugh Gordon Cummins addressed the House of Assembly on behalf of the Government, saying he was authorised to confirm that an investigation was taking place. Due to British jurisprudence laws and jurisdiction issues, the main substantive action the Barbadian Government could take was to call for the High Commissioner for Southern Africa to pursue its own investigations thoroughly and justly.

In South Africa, Visser was charged with culpable homicide, and he appeared before the Cape Town Magistrate's Court for a preparatory examination on April 13. On July 12, Visser was fined £10 (equivalent to £273 in 2025) for his role in King's death, but was not found guilty, since it could not be proven whether Visser or Groenewald had struck the ultimately-fatal blow. The presiding Magistrate Carnie censured the two policemen and was reported as remarking:

These two men only know who hit King the blow in the street which caused his death. How can I be asked to accept Groenewald's statement that Visser struck the blow when he is a confessed liar? I do not know why they are so stupid and inhuman as to fabricate this story and charge King with drunkenness. [...] I am inclined to believe that Groenewald is the man who struck the blow, but the court cannot rely on the evidence of one or the other constable. [...] I am sure, and have confidence, that you will be brought to task and be dealt with departmentally for your action.

— Magistrate J. T. Carnie

On August 10, the Cape Town Deputy Commissioner of Police, G. P. Britz, announced that a Police Department Board of Inquiry had investigated Visser and Groenewald's actions. Britz said that the men had been punished but that the specifics could not be made public. Although a police investigation allegedly found Visser 'unfit to remain in the force', the then-Minister of Justice C. R. Swart reportedly told the South African parliament in March 1952 that Visser would remain a police officer, as his conviction was "only for assault".

== Reactions ==
Responses in South Africa to Milton King's death (and the ensuing legal proceedings) are poorly documented, but opposition politicians did discuss it as an example of apartheid's injustices. In the wake of protests and riots in May 1951 opposing disenfranchisement of Coloured voters, United Party member Harry Lawrence criticised then-Minister of Justice C. R. Swart's force-heavy policing philosophy by citing "the Milton King case, where a policeman practically murdered a Coloured man and then lyingly said he was drunk."

SS Strategist returned to Barbados on June 28, anchoring in Carlisle Bay. Crew members who disembarked that evening wore black ties in honour of their deceased crewmate. King's funeral was held in the following days and was attended by much of the ship's crew, King's wife, and the officiating minister. In an interview with The Barbados Advocate, Hilton Browne, the Strategist cook who had accompanied King ashore, said that many of the West Indian crew aboard the vessel were afraid to even set foot on South African soil after King's death. Browne observed that Cape Town and Durban, the two South African cities where Strategist had docked, were both "filled with race segregation", including hotels that had refused all clients who were not 'strictly European'.

In late summer 1951, the Barbadian government announced it would be claiming damages on behalf of King's dependents. The King's Solicitor, likely Sir Lynn Ungoed-Thomas, collected details in August 1951 with the aim of lodging a formal compensation claim against the Union of South Africa's government. In August 1952, Barbados and South Africa negotiated the compensation amount in London; Barbados claimed £2500 (equivalent to £62,629 in 2025) but South Africa only offered £1800 (equivalent to £45,093 in 2025).

Even before the King case trial's end, protests were being coordinated across several British colonies in the West Indies. On July 10, 1951, British Guiana's Trades Union Congress (TUC) announced it would be hosting a mass demonstration in August against both South Africa changing its voting laws and King's beating. The Workers Union in Grenada also planned to protest, advocating for a ban that would prevent all South African goods and all European-descended South Africans from entering British Caribbean territories. It is unknown whether demonstrations actually took place in British Guiana and Grenada in August. The British Guiana TUC's call for Caribbean dock workers' unions to coordinate efforts on enforcing a goods ban would bear fruit later that year.

After the Visser verdict was delivered in mid-July, the League of Coloured Peoples (LCP) in London — perhaps the first deliberately multi-racial and Black-led organisation to push for racial justice in the United Kingdom — raised awareness about King's murder through a series of actions. The first was a protest meeting at Holborn Town Hall on July 29, 1951, which was featured in a Daily Express story. The day after the meeting, LCP secretary Sam Morris said that "[We] have not finished yet. This is only the beginning of our protest against the death of this West Indian seaman."

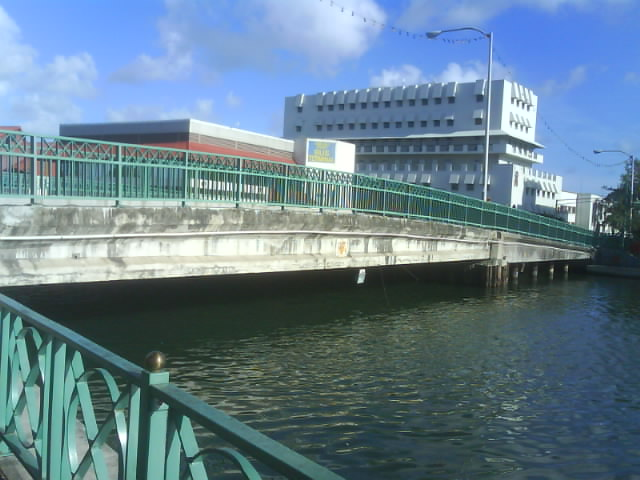
The Charles Duncan O'Neal Bridge in Bridgetown, Barbados. The August 25, 1951, protest march passed over the previous bridge built at this location.

On the afternoon of August 25, 1951, the Barbados Workers' Union and Barbados Labour Party led a march in Bridgetown protesting South African apartheid and Milton King's death in particular. About 10,000 people — almost five percent of the island's population at the time — joined the procession through the city's streets. Protestors carried signs reading: "Don't be Dupes; Boycott South African Goods; Don't Buy Jim Crow Ware"; "Kill Malanism; End Race Hatred"; and "One Barbadian Murdered; Fascists Must Go; No Room for Prejudice". An additional thousand arrived at the march's terminus at the Steel Shed in Queen's Park. There, activists and politicians including Grantley Adams, Errol Barrow, K. N. R. Husbands, and D. D. Garner gave speeches criticizing the Malan government's policies, the brutality of King's killing, and the disgraceful results of his killers' prosecution. The Steel Shed meeting passed two resolutions, which its members intended to send to the Governor of Barbados, the relevant authorities in the British Isles, the Government of South Africa, and even the Secretariat of the United Nations:

(1) We, thousands of West Indians of African descent, loyal British subjects, assembled at Queen's Park, Barbados on August 25, 1951, place on record our profound detestation of the racial policies of the South African Government which are not only the negation of democratic Government but are likely to be the cause of a deplorable conflict between the white and coloured races of this world.
(2) We, 10,000 Barbadians assembled in Bridgetown, Barbados, this 25th day of August, 1951, deplore the cowardly murder of Milton King, a Barbadian seaman, by a South African Policeman, sometime between March 3 and 4, 1951, and we demand that the strongest representations be made by the United Kingdom Government to the Union of South Africa to continue to take steps to bring his murderer to justice and to obtain suitable compensation for his widow and children.

— Bridgetown protest march resolutions

The procession ended with brass musicians playing Christian hymns in the streets, with a car containing King's wife, daughter, and two sons following behind. A newspaper editorial in the following days alleged that some Barbadian dockworkers were now claiming they would "refuse to handle cargoes of South African goods 'when they have told the merchants not to order them'", effectively threatening a boycott.

Barbadian unions seem to have made good on those threats, though the boycotts' extent and duration are somewhat difficult to gauge given the patchy historical record. The Rand Daily Mail, a Johannesburg newspaper that would later become known for its anti-apartheid stances, published two articles in October 1951 about Cape Town companies grappling with union-led boycotts in the West Indies. The first, on October 6, described a letter sent from a Bridgetown firm to a Cape Town exporter, reading: "The local trade union of waterside workers and lightermen is threatening to retaliate by refusing to unload or handle any cargo from South Africa. So until this matter is clarified — as doubtless it will be through Government action — we would not risk ordering any more goods from South Africa at present." The October 6 article also noted the August protests in Bridgetown and reported that The Beacon, the newspaper of the West Indian Labour Party, had advocated for further boycotts.

By October 10, Rand Daily Mail was reporting a multi-island boycott enforced largely by workers' unions. According to a Cape Town company (which was finding it difficult to continue selling canned goods to the West Indies), three importing firms in the Caribbean had informed them that they were unable to do business "owing to the strong anti-South African feeling prevailing among West Indians". Barbados and other islands in the Leeward and Windward groups had stopped buying from South Africa altogether; only Trinidad was continuing to purchase goods imported from Cape Town. Some smaller Caribbean islands had supposedly been boycotting particular sectors of South African goods since at least April. These embargoes emanated not from island governments, but instead from the trade unions that controlled which shipments could be loaded and unloaded. The duration of the boycotts, and how they were brought to an end, is unclear.

== Legacy ==
The public outcry and boycotts sparked by Milton King's murder marked an important moment in the early history of the international anti-apartheid movement. Although India had condemned South Africa at the United Nations for its racism against Indians in 1946–47, and some national labour unions had previously considered the idea of goods bans, the commercial boycotts begun across several Caribbean islands in the wake of King's death were the first known multi-national effort to economically sanction South Africa for its racist policies and treatment of non-whites. Historian Alan Cobley called them the beginning of the international anti-apartheid movement, and scholar Elizabeth Williams used the King case to highlight race consciousness and political action among West Indians who empathised with Africans' racial struggles.

Cobley argued these goods bans foreshadowed and contributed momentum to some of the first official government anti-apartheid sanctions. On July 2, 1959, the Jamaican government announced that it was banning all trade with South Africa, and the trade ministers of the colonies of Barbados, British Guiana, Dominica, and Grenada all declared their intention to follow suit (though all four later dropped those plans, potentially after lobbying by the British government).
