= Charles Arundel Moody =

British soldier (1917–2009)

- Moody c. 1943
- Born: Charles Arundel Moody; 15 April 1917; London, England
- Died: 11 January 2009 (aged 91); West Palm Beach, Florida, United States
- Other name: Joe Moody
- Education: Alleyn's School
- Occupation: Soldier
- Father: Harold Moody

Charles Arundel Murcott "Joe" Moody, OBE (15 April 1917, London – 11 January 2009, West Palm Beach, Florida) was a Black British soldier who was the first commanding officer (Lt. Col.) of the 3rd Battalion Regiment of the Jamaica Regiment.

== Early life and education ==
Charles Arundel Moody was born in London, England, the son of Harold Moody and his wife Olive. Harold was a medical doctor and the political activist who founded the League of Coloured Peoples (LCP). Charles attended Alleyn's School, the all-boys independent school in Dulwich, London.

== Military career ==
Moody was 22 when the Second World War started in 1939. Under the impression he was eligible to become an officer in the British Army, he went to Whitehall for an interview, where he was dismayed to learn that only those of pure European descent could be commissioned as officers. However, his father mobilised the League of Coloured Peoples, the International African Service Bureau and the West African Students Union to campaign against this colour bar.

Having attended an Officer Cadet Training Unit, Moody was commissioned in the Queen's Own Royal West Kent Regiment (RWK), British Army, on 20 April 1940 as a second lieutenant. On 1 August 1942, he transferred to the Royal Artillery with the war substantive rank of lieutenant. He returned to the RWK on 31 October 1944. By the end of the war, he held the war substantive rank of captain.

On 1 January 1949, he transferred to the Regular Army Reserve of Officers with the rank of captain and was also granted the honorary rank of major; this ended his full-time service in the British Army and was the beginning of a period of call-up liability. On 15 April 1967, he relinquished his commission having attained the age limit for officers and was allowed to retain the honorary rank of major.

== Later life ==
After the end of the Second World War, Moody moved to Jamaica where he worked for Jamaica Public Service (JPS) and became a justice of the peace. He also continued his military service in the Jamaican reserves. In the 1965 New Year Honours, he was appointed an Officer of the Order of the British Empire (OBE), in recognition of his service as commanding officer of the 3rd Battalion, The Jamaica Regiment (National Reserve). He was a Freemason, and rose to become District Grand Senior Warden of the District Grand Lodge of Jamaica. He retired from JPS in 1975, having risen to become a deputy managing director.

In 1977, Moody moved to the United States with his family. They settled in Syracuse, New York, where he worked for Syracuse Housing Authority. He was active in his local United Methodist Church. He continued his involvement in Freemasonry in the United States. In addition to Syracuse, he lived in Rochester, Michigan, Tonawanda, New York, before finally moving to West Palm Beach, Florida.
