= At What a Price =

At What A Price is a play by Jamaican feminist and writer Una Marson. It was co-written with her friend Horace Vaz in 1931 when Marson was 26 and first performed in Jamaica in 1932. The play's success provided funds for Marson to travel to London, where it was staged at the Scala Theatre on Charlotte Street in January 1934. Other performances in London included at the YWCA Central Hall on Great Russell Street on 23 November 1933. This performance featured an all Black cast, and was described by Harold Moody as "the first time anything of the kind has been done by an amateur group."

Marson herself performed in the production at the Scala Theatre which was staged by civil-rights organisation The League of Coloured Peoples. It was the first all-Black production in London's West End which is more usually identified as Toussaint Louverture by C.L.R. James but which was not performed until 1936. Marson is also the first Black female playwright to have had her work performed in the West End, which contemporary British Theatre credits to Natasha Gordon for her 2018 play Nine Night.

In its depiction of the exploitation of a naive young Black woman from the Jamaican countryside, the four act play explores themes of women's desire, interracial relations and sexual harassment in the workplace.

The only known surviving manuscript is in the Lord Chamberlain's Plays collection at the British Library.

== Plot ==
Ruth Maitland is a young black woman from the countryside who travels to the Jamaican capital Kingston to find work. She finds a job as a stenographer and is seduced by her employer, a white British man named Gerald Fitzroy by whom she falls pregnant. At the end of the play Ruth is back in rural Jamaica where she is proposed to by a long term admirer called Rob.
