= Linnette Vassell =

Jamaican academic and feminist

- Education: University of the West Indies
- Employer(s): Ministry of Water and Housing, Jamaica
- Organization(s): Committee of Women for Progress; The 51% Coalition
- Known for: Legal, water rights, and feminism activism
- Awards: Ubuntu Essence of Humanity Trophy, 2022

Linnette Vassell is a Jamaican academic, writer, and feminist, who advocates for gender equity and community management of water resources.

She was influential in the creation of Jamaica's Minimum Wage Act and the Maternity Leave Act.

== Education ==
Vassell has a master of philosophy degree in history from the University of the West Indies.

== Career and advocacy ==
She taught Caribbean history, with a focus on women's history and women's rights, at the University of the West Indies during the 1980s and 1990s when she became known for her feminism.

In 1976, she became the first coordinator of the left-wing activist organization the Committee of Women for Progress where she pushed for legal reforms. She has been a member of the Board of the Small Business Association of Jamaica, the global Gender and Water Alliance, and the Caribbean Association for Feminist Research and Action. She was a key figure behind The 51% Coalition, gender equity alliance.

In 2019, she was named as a Living Legacy Honoree by the Caribbean Community of Retired Persons and by 2021 she was working at the Ministry of Water and Housing.

In 2022, she won the University of Technology's Ubuntu Essence of Humanity Trophy in recognition of her contributions towards the 1970's Minimum Wage Act, and the Maternity Leave Act; and for her impact in enabling community control of water and sanitation systems for those in inner-city low-income, rural and remote communities in Jamaica.

== Publications (book chapters) ==
- Power, Governance and the Structure of Opportunity for Women in Decision-Making in Jamaica in Patricia Mohammed (editor of) The Construction of Gender Development Indicators for Jamaica, PIOJ/UNDP/CIDA, 2000, Kingston Jamaica
- Colonial Gender Policy in Jamaica, 1865-1944, in Brian Moore & Swithin Wilmot, editors of Before and After 1865: Education, Politics and Regionalism in the Caribbean, (1998)

== See also ==
- Feminism in the Caribbean
