= Feminism in the Caribbean =

Movement in the Caribbean

Feminism in the Caribbean refers to the collection of movements and ideologies aimed at defining, establishing, and defending a state of equal political, economic, cultural, and social rights for women in the Caribbean.

Feminism in the Caribbean is an evolving movement that is shaped by the region’s history through predominantly slavery, colonialism, colorism, and classism. This article explores all sides of Feminism in the Caribbean, including historical and contemporary, as well as the movement's future. It highlights the unique challenges faced by working-class women, and the racial and class divide within the movement that has led to the declining engagement of Feminism in the Caribbean. This article delves into the key determinants, as well as the historical figures who have made strides to push progress forward despite the setbacks within the movement. It also examines the efforts and agendas in place today to create an inclusive space for all women in the Caribbean region to achieve equality through economic security, education, reproductive rights, and political leadership.

== Historical feminism ==
=== Background ===
At the onset of Atlantic Slave Trade, black male labor was largely favored to that of black female labor. Eventually, though, the notion of women as indentured servants was introduced as a means to maximize economic profitability. This meant that, historically, women were valued largely for their reproductive capabilities which was thought to be an integral part of plantation sustainability. The slave trade and indentured servitude launched the racial and gendered institutional struggles that women would face for times to come.

Following 1838, the post-emancipation period offered a time in which a number of Indian indentured servants were introduced to the Caribbean. The influx inadvertently offset the ratio between indentured women and men, and, as a result, increased the desire for the incorporation of women into the bodies of servitude. These longterm struggles ultimately forged the way for the female revolutions and radical movements to come.

=== Early movements ===
The 1970s marked a time in which the feminist movement gained traction. The following decade included a number of attempts at inter-regionally building transitional feminist networks that spread geographically between Latin America and the Caribbean. This platform was founded and established by young, leftist generations. Immediately following the devastation that resulted from the Cold War, the 1990s marked a period in which the feminist movement shifted focus toward female perspectives on political matters such as globalization, environmental crises and development.

In 1995, the Fourth World Conference on Women signaled significant mobilization for the Caribbean feminist movement. This platform functioned as a means to take advantage of national representation and regional collaboration. Since then, the feminist movement has experienced friction in regards to the debate over whether or not feminist organizing should shift toward more professional nongovernment organizations (NGOs). The shift threatens the prevalence of small, identity-based social movement organizations and has thus sparked controversy among feminist players, specifically leftist feminist networks.

During the time of early Caribbean Feminist movements, feminists such as Uma Marson and Amy Bailey had significant impacts when it came to advocating for women in Jamaica. Their activism shaped important foundations for the early stages but it should be noted their leadership was due to their class division and the education they had received. These components play into issues within the movement surrounding colorism and exclusion, led by women with voices that were boosted due to their privileged position in society.

=== Colorism and exclusion ===
An ongoing critique of Caribbean Feminism is the exclusionary nature led by its leaders. The movement has been plagued by colorism and classism due to middle-class and light-skinned women being uplifted in their voices while simultaneously excluding the working class and dark-skinned women. This is specifically seen in Jamaica. This divide caused tensions between women in this region, as the middle-class claimed superiority over the working class. "But ultimately, respectable nationalists saw themselves as superior to the largely uneducated, unwed working classes, and this sense of superiority fostered a class division particularly prominent between middle and working class women" (Rosenberg, 47). This divide due to classism and colorism complicates the nature of inclusive female solidarity within feminism.

=== Colonialism ===
Colonialism in the Caribbean has shaped gender roles, which have positioned the expectation for women to reproduce and work in domestic roles. These colonial practices have set up corrupt financial systems that have carried on in their influence today. Exploitative indentured labor and reproduction have kept women suppressed financially and socially. Their work is overlooked by society as they are underpaid, overworked, and undervalued. The intersection of colonialism and capitalism keep women in the Caribbean limited to domestic labor roles and economically vulnerable. The Caribbean Feminist movement challenges these patriarchal norms by advocating for economic gender equality in labor and leadership.

== Contemporary feminism ==
=== Movement division ===
Ambiguity regarding the term "feminism" has created difficulties for the Caribbean Feminist Movement. Some feminists argue that it is necessary that the movement confront the skewed hierarchy which continues to exist and shape the relations between men and women, and as a result, women's status and access to goods and resources within society. Thus, the movement continues to focus on the "interrogation of masculinity and the bargaining with the tendencies of the patriarchy."

The term "feminism" has divided women in the Caribbean region due to the ongoing issue of colorism and classism that is deeply-rooted into the history. As a result, distrust of the Caribbean Feminist Movement is prominent in women who are a part of the working-class and have darker skin. This disconnection is due to the inexposure of their voices and lived-experiences. In addition, many women of faith have felt alienated from the Feminist Movement as some Caribbean feminists perceive religion and spirituality as aligning with contradictory values against the movement. This failure to engage with women from all backgrounds has weakened the agency of the Caribbean Feminist movement as a whole, as the lack of participation is a direct result. This has turned many women away from embracing feminist ideas and participating in those spaces. As these tensions build, creating a feminist movement that acknowledges and celebrates different cultures, classes, races, and spiritualities, through inclusivity and intersectionality, is a goal that is still yet to be made.

In summary, the feminist agenda, as it applies in the twenty-first century, comprises a mission to expose more concretely the socioeconomic flaws within the patriarchal system. Specifically, that "patriarchal privilege costs both men and society a heavy price, and that there are alternative and more fruitful ways of organizing the sexual division of labour, of managing households and families, of ruling societies and shaping welfare policies, and of structuring the global political economy such that the arguments between ethnic or radicalized groups, different class and sexes, are not resolved through violence and warfare."

=== Digital activism ===
This past decade, digital activism has grown globally. The rise of social media and online platforms has encouraged women to speak up about their experiences, provide shared support, and discuss patriarchal issues in a large online space. This form of activism is practiced widely by younger generations through social media, blogs, and other online community spaces. Digital activism has created a more inclusive and intersectional space for all feminists, as it is an easier and accessible way for them to communicate and find one another online. This is particularly important for amplifying women's voices who are a part of the working class, have dark skin, and follow a form of religion. Digital activism is important when it comes to engaging and encouraging more women to share their voices online, often when they are not able to be heard within their own communities.

== Key determinants ==
=== Economic, political, and reproductive rights ===
The economic, political, and reproductive rights for women in the Caribbean are an on-going battle for equality. Economically, women in the Caribbean struggle with wage gaps and unequal access to positions of authority in the Caribbean. Due to the lasting effects of colonial and capitalist influences, women in the Caribbean region are limited to jobs within domestic spaces. Reproductive rights in the Caribbean remain controversial due to unequal access to contraceptive care and abortions, which puts women in the region at risk of higher mortality rates during childbirth or illegal abortions. Women and feminist issues are highly underrepresented in Caribbean politics. Systemic biases and culture and gender norms in the region make it difficult for women to climb their way up in political leadership positions. Their voices struggle to be heard, and they are often not taken seriously.

=== Education ===
Access to education for women in the Caribbean region has been growing, but not without the exclusion of minorities and less privileged women. Factors such as gender, class, and race effect how women are able to receive an education, especially at a higher level. Alongside unequal access, often due to class and privilege, gender stereotypes and traditional culture norms can often discourage women from getting an education as well.

=== Violence against women ===
Domestically and publicly, there has been a long history of high rates of violence. Systematically, women in the region are not protected by law enforcement, which leaves them vulnerable to higher mortality rates. There is also a limited amount of support for women who have experience violence, mentally and physically. Another note on women in politics is that they are more likely to experience violence through sexual harassment, threats, verbal and physical abuse. This is a central issue to feminists in the Caribbean as violence reinforces the patriarchal systems set in place to keep gender inequality intact.

=== Future developments ===
The movement depends largely on the overall extent to which young men and women feel the prevalence of gender inequality. Once this reality can be recognized, it is then a matter of how compelled the subjects are to combat the issue. Finally, the movement will continue to depend on the democratic freedoms available to ultimately transform this struggle.

In addition, the media has played an integral role in the feminist movement. The significance that accompanies the portrayal of women within the media lies in the fact that media contributes to the overall shaping of societal ways of thinking. The advertising industry maintains tremendous power. Since investment in media has grown exponentially, a representative depiction of women will be crucial to the future of the feminist movement.

== Prominent Caribbean Feminists ==
=== Historical feminists ===
Amy Bailey was a historical feminist figure within the early stages of the Caribbean feminist movement. Her activism stretches from the period of the 1930s to the 1940s. In Jamaica, she advocated for women's suffrage and labor rights, as well as founding the Women's Liberal Club where conferences were held to discuss women's issues in the region.

Una Marson alongside Bailey, also advocated for women's suffrage through her writings and broadcasting, discussing issues on race and gender equality. Her prime era of activism was also around the 1930s-1940s. She also made contributions to the anti-colonial movement through her organizing with women's groups.

Abigail Mejia and Livia Veloz were Dominican feminists who founded Acción Feminista Dominicana (AFD) in 1931, a feminist organization which advocated for women's suffrage and education. AFD eventually aligned with president and dictator Rafael Trujillo to achieve their aims. Historians and feminist scholars have debated the degree to which AFD was coerced into cooperation with Trujillo. AFD feminists were given key roles as administrators and advisors in Trujillo's ruling party, particularly in social services. AFD operated eleven night schools for working class women, established a library in Santo Domingo, and distributed baby baskets to new mothers. Veloz wrote Historia del Feminismo en la República Dominicana, which is an important source for the history of Dominican feminism.

=== Contemporary feminists ===
Professor Patricia Mohammed "has been involved in feminist activism and scholarship for over two decades...Her academic publications include Gender in Caribbean Development, (co-edited with Catherine Shepherd), 1988, Rethinking Caribbean Difference, Guest Editor, Special Issue, Feminist Review, Routledge Journals, Summer 1998, Caribbean Women at the Crossroads, co-author with Althea Perkins, University of the West Indies, Kingston, 2002, along with numerous essays in journals and books, magazines and newspapers."

Activist Asha Maharaj, advocates for women's rights by discussing and researching activism on social media. She has researched how social media and online activism can help women connect globally, to create safe spaces that discuss issues such as LGBTQ+ rights, reproductive health, and gender-based violence.

Andrea Baldwin, a professor at the University of the West Indies, advocates for women by researching inclusive approaches to Caribbean feminism. Through challenging gender norms, and advocating for women who have been silenced by historical feminism, Baldwin contributes to the future of Caribbean feminism through connectivity and community.
