= Additional manuscripts =

Manuscript collection at the British Library

The Additional manuscripts is a collection of manuscripts stored at the British Library. The collection was started at the British Museum in 1756, and passed to the British Library on its establishment in 1973. They form by far the largest collection of manuscripts at the library, and comprise all the manuscripts acquired by gift, purchase or bequest since 1756 that are not part of the "closed" collections or other named "open" collections. Because the collection was originally thought of as a continuation of the Sloane manuscripts collection (numbers 1–4100), the "Additional manuscripts" collections start with number 4101.

The library maintains a series of catalogues and indexes to the Additional series. These catalogues have been published in 5-year volumes which also include catalogues for the other open collections of the library.

Manuscripts in this collection have been used extensively as references in later works. In the nineteenth century, British scholars (e.g., in the Dictionary of National Biography) assumed that the collection was so well known that a reference to "Addit. MS." was sufficient to name the collection without further reference.

== Subsets ==
Some subsets of the "Additional" series have been indexed separately. These include:

- The Gladstone Papers (Add MS 44086–44835)
- The Yelverton Manuscripts (Add MS 48000–48196)
- The Bernard Shaw Papers (Add MS 50508–50743)
- The Cecil of Chelwood Papers (Add MS 51071–51204)
- The Lord Chamberlain's Plays and Day-Books, 1824-1903 (Add MS 52929–53708)
- The Blenheim Papers (Add MS 61101–61701)
- The Petty Papers (Add MS 72850–72908)
