= Emanuel Peter John Adeniyi Thomas =

Royal Air Force officer

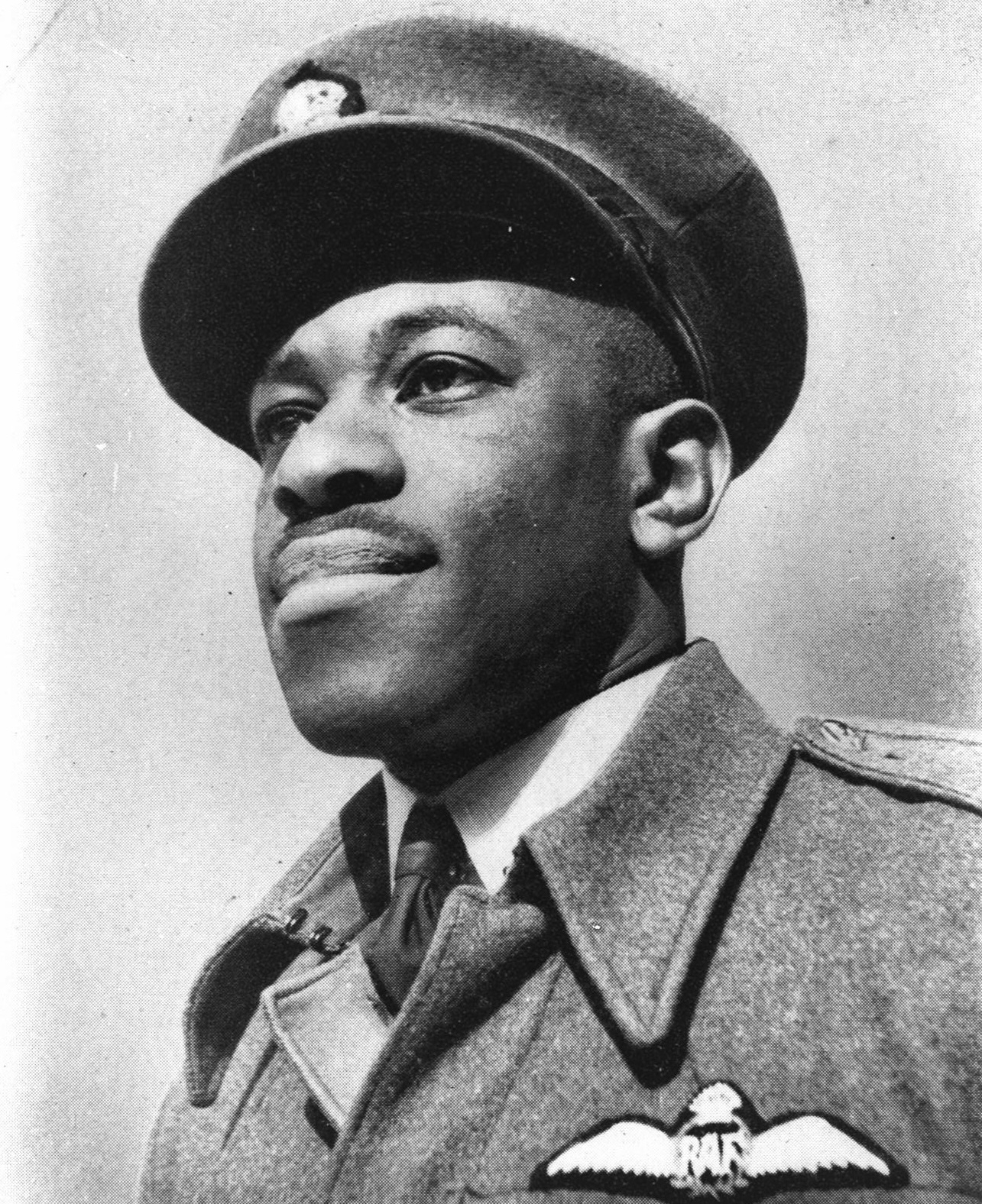

Flight Lieutenant Emanuel Peter John Adeniyi Thomas (1914 – 12 January 1945) was a Nigerian born Royal Air Force (RAF) officer and first West African to be granted a commission in the RAF.

== Early life and education ==
He was born in Lagos to Peter John Claudius Thomas, a Sierra Leone Creole businessman and Josetta Mary Thomas (née Cole). His older sibling was Stella Thomas, first woman magistrate in West Africa. He attended King's College, Lagos and worked for his father before joining the Labour Department of the Nigerian Government. He and his family belonged to the Saro people and were of Yoruba descent.

== RAF career ==
Thomas was inspired to join the Royal Air Force (RAF) after reading about The Battle of Britain. His application to the RAF was supported by Charles Woolley, the chief secretary to the government of Nigeria, who personally forwarded Thomas's application to London. Writing about his partial inspiration to join the RAF, Thomas noted:

"My great-grandfather was a chieftain. One day his rival betrayed him to a slave dealer. He was put on a ship along with 100 other slaves and was soon on his way to America. Ten days out in the Atlantic his ship was intercepted by one of Her Majesty’s ships. The slaves were rescued, and at Freetown (Sierra Leone), my great-grandfather regained his freedom."

He travelled to the United Kingdom to enlist in the RAF. On 17 September 1942, he became the first Black African to qualify as a pilot and was commissioned as an officer. He received two promotions: one in 1943 to Flying Officer and the other in September 1944, to Flight Lieutenant. In his spare time he helped the Colonial Office by welcoming visiting West African students to London.

== Death ==
He died in an air crash on 12 January 1945 and is buried at Bath Cemetery.
