= Foreign relations of South Africa during apartheid =

Foreign relations of South Africa during apartheid refers to the foreign relations of South Africa between 1948 and 1994. South Africa introduced apartheid in 1948, as a systematic extension of pre-existing racial discrimination laws. Initially the regime implemented an offensive foreign policy trying to consolidate South African hegemony over Southern Africa. These attempts had failed by the late 1970s. As a result of its racism, occupation of Namibia and foreign interventionism in Angola, the country became increasingly isolated internationally.

== Initial relations ==
In the aftermath of World War II and the Nazi Holocaust, the Western world began distancing itself from ideas of racial dominance and policies based on racial prejudice, though it would still take years to fully disappear from official policy in parts, as exemplified by the Jim Crow laws of the United States. Racially discriminatory and segregationist principles were not novelties in South Africa, given the racial make-up of their society. From unification in 1910, the state had been run by the white minority and pursued segregation from there. Apartheid was a certified, lawful and inflexible type of separation that was methodically entrenched from 1948 through a battery of legislation. As it was not completely new to the country, and because many Western countries still exercised their own forms of prejudice in their assorted colonies, there was minimal rejoinder and indignation. The conclusion of the Second World War signified the commencement of the Cold War, and South Africa, with its anticommunist stance, was considered a possible assistant in the passive battle against the Soviet Union.

The world did not, however, condone South Africa's discriminatory policies. At the first United Nations gathering in 1946, South Africa was placed on the program. The primary subject in question was the handling of South African Indians, a critical cause of hostility between South Africa and India. In 1952, apartheid was thrashed out again in the aftermath of the Defiance Campaign, and Indian demands caused the UN to set up a task team to keep watch on the state of racial affairs and the progress of apartheid in South Africa. Although racial segregation in South Africa was a cause for concern, most countries in the UN concurred that race was an internal issue for South Africa, which fell outside the UN's jurisdiction. Only later did the UN become resolute in challenging South Africa. In 1952, 13 African and Asian countries sponsored a UN General Assembly resolution condemning apartheid as a violation of the Charter of the United Nations.

South Africa's treatment of Coloureds people under early apartheid was also highlighted by the death of Milton King while in police custody in 1951. King's killing sparked numerous protests, marches, and union-led boycotts across the Caribbean and United Kingdom that foreshadowed Jamaica's 1959 government-wide economic boycott of South African goods.

== Sharpeville and the severing of British ties ==
South Africa's policies were subject to international scrutiny in 1960, when British Prime Minister Harold Macmillan criticised them during his celebrated Wind of Change speech in Cape Town. Weeks later, tensions came to a head in the Sharpeville massacre, resulting in more international condemnation. Soon thereafter, South African Prime Minister Hendrik Verwoerd announced a referendum on whether the country should sever links with the British monarchy and become a republic instead. Verwoerd lowered the voting age for whites to eighteen and included whites in South West Africa on the voter's roll. The referendum on 5 October that year asked whites, "Do you support a republic for the Union?", and 52 per cent voted "Yes".

As a consequence of this change of status, South Africa needed to reapply for continued membership of the Commonwealth, with which it had privileged trade links. Even though India became a republic within the Commonwealth in 1950, it became clear that African and Asian member states would oppose South Africa due to its apartheid policies. As a result, South Africa withdrew from the Commonwealth on 31 May 1961, the day the country became a republic.

In 1960, the UN's conservative stance on apartheid changed. The Sharpeville massacre had jolted the global community, with the apartheid regime showing that it would use violent behaviour to repress opposition to racial inequity. Many Western states began to see apartheid as a possible danger to global peace and stability, as the policy caused much intercontinental abrasion over human-rights violation.

In April 1960, the UN Security Council settled for the first time on concerted action against the apartheid regime, demanding that the National Party bring an end to racial separation and discrimination; but, instead, the South African administration merely employed further suppressive instruments. The ANC and PAC were forbidden from continued existence, and political assemblies were prohibited. From then on, the UN placed the South African issue high on its list of priorities.

In 1961, UN Secretary-General Dag Hammarskjöld stopped over in South Africa and subsequently stated that he had been powerless to effect a concurrence with Prime Minister Hendrik Verwoerd. That same year, Verwoerd proclaimed South Africa's exit from the Commonwealth as a result of its censure of his government.

== Sanctions ==
On 6 November 1962, the United Nations General Assembly passed Resolution 1761, condemning South African apartheid policies. On 7 August 1963, the United Nations Security Council passed Resolution 181 calling for a voluntary arms embargo against South Africa, and that very year, a Special Committee Against Apartheid was established to encourage and oversee plans of action against the regime.

In 1966, the United Nations held the first (of many) colloquiums on apartheid. The General Assembly announced 21 March as the International Day for the Elimination of Racial Discrimination, in memory of the Sharpeville massacre. In 1971, the UN General Assembly formally denounced the institution of homelands, and a motion was passed in 1974 to eject South Africa from the UN, but this was discarded by France, the United Kingdom and the United States, all of them key trade partners of South Africa.

One probable type of action against South Africa was economic sanction. If UN affiliates broke fiscal and trading links with the country, it would make it all the trickier for the apartheid government to uphold itself and its policies. Such sanctions were argued frequently within the UN, and many recognised and backed it as an effectual and non-violent way of applying force, but South Africa's major trading partners once more voted against mandatory sanctions. In 1962, the UN General Assembly requested that its members split political, fiscal and transportation connections with South Africa. In 1968, it suggested the deferral of all cultural, didactic and sporting commerce as well. From 1964, the US and UK discontinued their dealings of armaments to South Africa. In spite of the many cries for sanctions, however, none were made obligatory, because South Africa's main trading partners were again primarily concerned for their own financial security.

In 1977, the voluntary UN arms embargo became mandatory with the passing of United Nations Security Council Resolution 418.

An oil embargo was introduced on 20 November 1987 when the UN General Assembly adopted a voluntary international oil embargo.

== Aid to apartheid casualties ==
Another way in which the UN could do something to combat apartheid was to lend support and aid to its victims. In 1963, the General Assembly passed a decree requesting that members contribute financially towards assisting apartheid sufferers.

=== Lusaka Manifesto ===
The Organisation for African Unity (OAU) was created in 1963. Its primary objectives were to eradicate colonialism and improve social, political and economic situations in Africa. It censured apartheid and demanded sanctions against South Africa. African states swore to aid the freedom movements in their fights against apartheid. In April 1969, fourteen Central and East African nations gathered in Lusaka, Zambia, to discuss various matters affecting the continent. The assembly formulated the 'Lusaka Manifesto', which was signed on 13 April by all of the countries in attendance, except for Malawi. This manifesto was later taken on by both the OAU and the United Nations.

The Lusaka Manifesto summarised the political situations of self-governing African countries, snubbing racism and inequity, and calling for black majority rule in all African nations. It did not rebuff South Africa entirely, though, adopting an appeasing manner towards the apartheid government, and even recognising its autonomy. Although African principals desired the emancipation of black South Africans, they trusted in their abilities to attain this in peaceable ways, intercession instead of militancy. The manifesto's signatories did not want to engage in a military war by supporting the liberation pugilists, because, for one thing, they could ill afford it and, for another, they dreaded retaliation.

=== Morogoro Conference ===
Neither the ANC nor the PAC was content with the Lusaka Manifesto. The signatories had not checked with them before laying out the document, and they foresaw the fact that African backing for the struggle would taper. The Manifesto did not truly recognise the significance of the liberation groups in the answer to South Africa's problems and even proposed dissuading them from an armed struggle. Both the ANC and the PAC had started using violent means in the 1960s, with the formation of their military wings.

Disinclined to destroy the support that they did have, however, the ANC and PAC did not explicitly condemn the Manifesto. In 1969, though, the ANC held the inaugural National Consultative Conference in Morogoro, Tanzania, where it ironed out its troubles and anxieties. The result was a decision not to end the armed struggle but, rather, to advance it. Oliver Tambo summed up thus: "Close Ranks! This is the order to our people, our youth, the army, to each Umkhonto we Sizwe militant, to all our many supporters the world over. This is the order to our leaders, to all of us. The order that comes from this conference is 'Close Ranks and Intensify the Armed Struggle!'"

Unlike the independence factions, the South African administration hailed the Lusaka Manifesto's plans for arbitration and détente. This tied in nicely with Prime Minister Vorster's own plan for the reduction of South Africa's seclusion from the rest of the world. He called his "Outward looking" policy. The state also maintained that the preservation of separate development through homelands carried out the Manifesto's insistence on human equality and dignity. The homelands, it argued, were meant eventually to be self-governing, decolonised nations where black people could take part in ballots and be free to live how they wished.

That is not to say that the NP government agreed to the Lusaka Manifesto, however. It rejected the manifesto's backing of liberation movements, although the movements themselves felt the Manifesto was showing a lack of support.

=== Mogadishu Declaration ===
South Africa's negative response to the Lusaka Manifesto and rejection of a change to its policies brought about another OAU announcement in 1971. The Mogadishu Declaration declared that "there is no way left to the liberation of Southern Africa except armed struggle", and condemned African states which maintained diplomatic and other relations with South Africa. Henceforth, it would be up to South Africa to keep contact with other African states.

== Outward-Looking Policy ==
In 1966, BJ Vorster was made South African Prime Minister. He was not about to eliminate apartheid, but he did try to redress South Africa's seclusion and the purported larger mentality. He wanted to perk up the country's global reputation and overseas dealings, even those with black-ruled nations in Africa. This he called his "Outward-Looking" policy: South Africa would look outwards, towards the global neighbourhood, rather than adopting a siege mentality and estranging it. The buzzwords for his strategy were "dialogue" and "détente", signifying arbitration and reduction of pressure.

=== Western ties ===
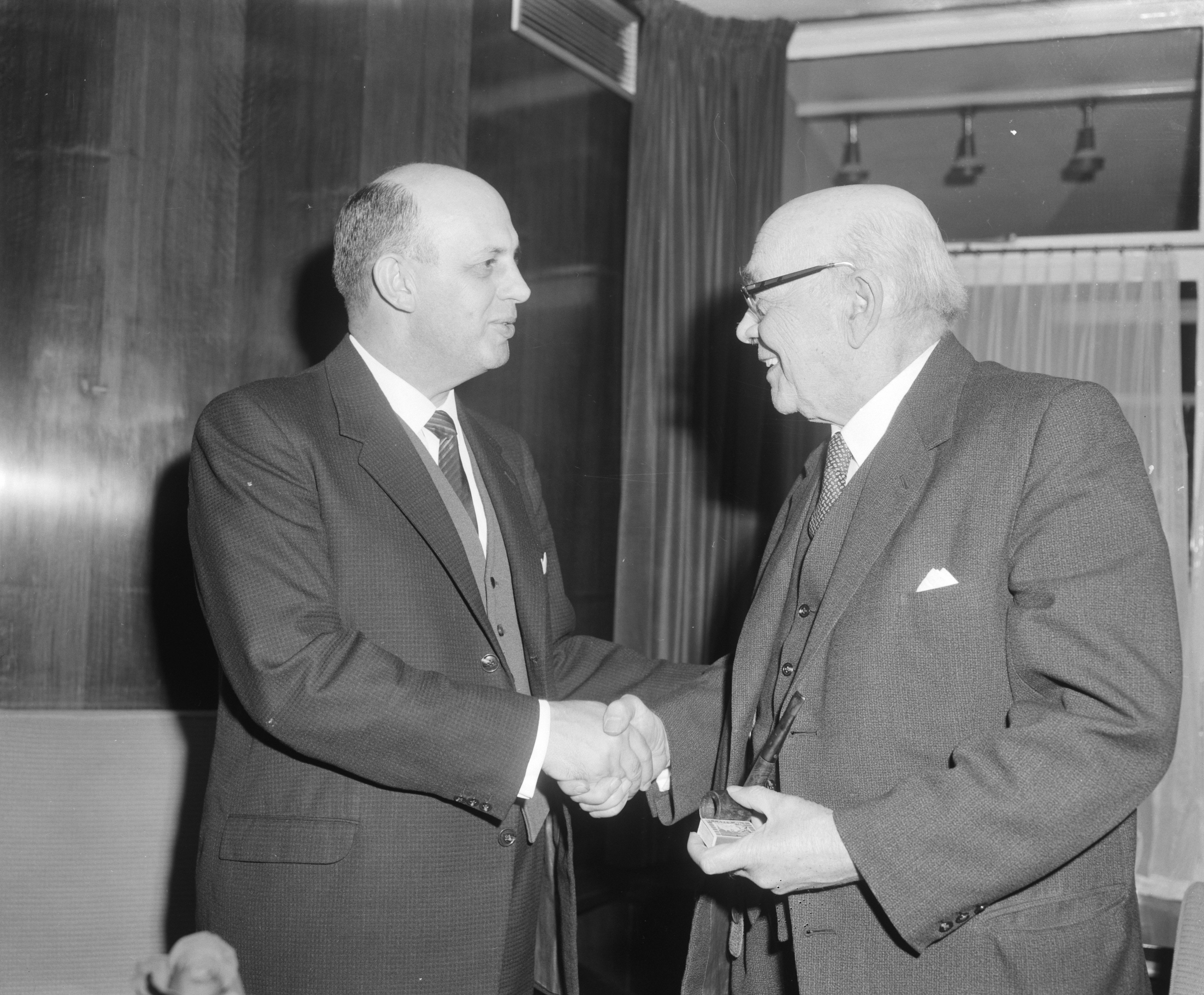
P.W. Botha (then as minister of Minister of Community Development and Coloured Affairs) joined by ambassador of South Africa mr. Rust in the Netherlands (right)

The "Outward Looking" principle had a significant consequence for South Africa's relationships with Western nations. When Vorster brought forth his strategy, it appeared to them that South Africa might be loosening its grip. At the same time, the West regarded the apartheid administration as a significant friend in the Cold War. Economically, such nations as Britain and America had numerous concerns in South Africa, and, although they did not endorse apartheid, these concerns led them to a more moderate stance on the country and to vote against financial sanctions at UN conferences.

==== United Kingdom ====
When South Africa pulled out of the Commonwealth in 1961, the United Kingdom led resistance to calls for punitive monetary and trade sanctions. It had many key economic links and, in particular, benefited from trade with South Africa's gold mining industry.

There were also strategic motives for not severing all ties with the apartheid government. As the southernmost nation in Africa, and the juncture of the Indian and Atlantic Oceans, South Africa was still a vital point in sea-trade routes. In 1969, the Commandant General of the South African Defence Force (SADF) confirmed that, "[i]n the entire ocean expanse from Australia to South America, South Africa is the only fixed point offering modern naval bases, harbours and airfield facilities, a modern developed industry and stable government." South Africa was also a pivotal partner to the West in the years of the Cold War. If the West ever required martial, maritime or air-force services on the African continent, it would have to rely on South Africa's assistance.

From 1960 to 1961, the relationship between South Africa and Britain started to change. In his "Wind of Change" speech in Cape Town, Harold Macmillan spoke of the changes in Africa and how South Africa's racist policies were swimming upstream. Even as more countries added to the call for sanctions, Britain remained unwilling to sever ties with the apartheid administration. Possible reasons were its copious assets in the state, an unwillingness to hazard turbulence brought on by intercontinental meddling, and the fact that many British people had kith and kin living in South Africa or, indeed, were living there themselves. Along with America, Britain would persistently vote against certain sanctions against South Africa.

However, there was significant and notable resistance to apartheid within the United Kingdom, such as the Anti-Apartheid Movement. London Recruits: The Secret War Against Apartheid is a 2012 book documenting assistance given to the ANC from activists in the UK. In 1995, during his official state visit to the UK, Nelson Mandela appeared on the balcony of High Commission of South Africa, London to thank supporters in the UK. The High Commission had been a constant target of protests during apartheid.

South Africa rejoined the Commonwealth in 1994, albeit, as a republic in the Commonwealth of Nations and not a realm.

==== United States ====
At the outset of apartheid, the United States avoided serious criticism of South Africa's racial policies in part because several U.S. states, especially in the Deep South, had similar policies under the Jim Crow laws. Following the 1960 Sharpeville massacre, however, the country voted for a United Nations Security Council resolution condemning the massacre. The US impressed a severe armament embargo on South Africa from 1964, and, from 1967, the United States Navy avoided South African harbors. Unlike Britain, the USA did not see much importance in the Cape route, but they did see the economic opportunities for South African investment. Imports and exports between the two states came to many millions of dollars. Financial ties aside, there were also numerous cultural links between South Africa and the United States. South Africans of all races were given the chance to study in the US with scholarships. The US even utilised South Africa for its exploration of outer space, setting up a satellite tracking post near Krugersdorp, and building numerous telescopes for lunar probes. This picked up ailing ties between the two countries, but, in the 1970s, the United States withdrew from the tracking station.

Richard Nixon and Henry Kissinger had adopted a policy known as the Tar Baby Option, according to which the US ought to maintain close relations with the Apartheid government of South Africa. The United States also increased trade with the country, while describing the ANC as "a terrorist organisation." The Reagan administration evaded international sanctions against South Africa and vetoed the Comprehensive Anti-Apartheid Act, which mandated compliance with the sanctions, but Congress in 1986 overruled the veto despite some Republican opposition. The U.S. also provided diplomatic support to the South African government in international forums.

As fiscal ties between South Africa, the United States and the United Kingdom were reinforced, however, sporting and cultural boycotts became important gadgets in South Africa's isolation from international society. The arms prohibition obliged South Africa to look elsewhere (particularly France) for its artillery, build up its own technology and manufacture weapons itself. At first, the Cold War had little influence on the connection between the West and South Africa: the US believed that the armament embargo would not put up a barrier between them. If a major quarrel broke out in Africa, South Africa would be forced to work with the US anyway.

==== Israel ====
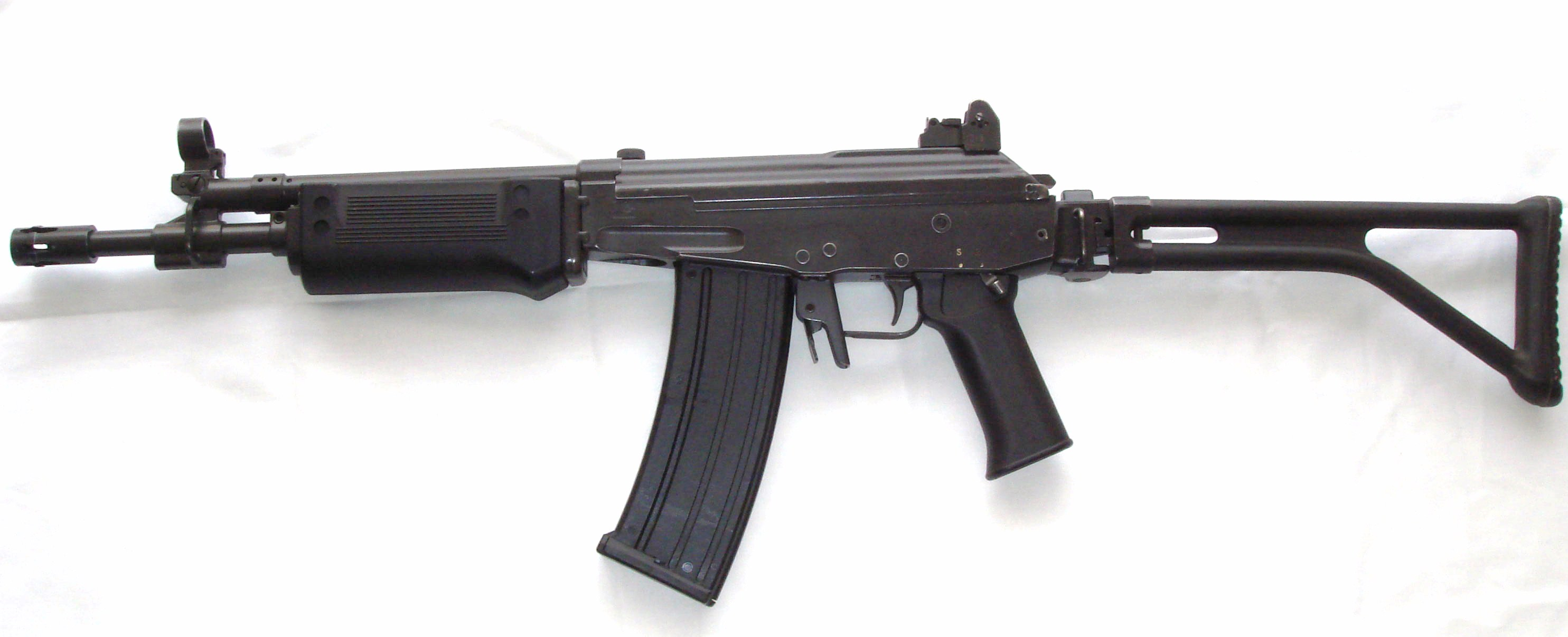
Israel Military Industries Galil assault rifle, manufactured under license in South Africa as the R5

Relations between the State of Israel and the Union of South Africa were established as early as 1948, the Nationalist Prime Minister Daniel François Malan paying a visit to Israel and ignoring the clearly antisemitic profile his own party earned during the 1930s and by its opposition to joining in the Anti-Hitlerite coalition in World War II. In 1963, Israel imposed an arms embargo in compliance with United Nations Security Council Resolution 181, and recalled its ambassador. During this period, Israel contributed an annual $7,000,000 in medical, agricultural, and other aid to Sub-Saharan states.

After the 1967 Six-Day War Sub-Saharan African nations cut off diplomatic relations with Israel, and the latter became Pretoria's strategic partner, establishing strong economic and military relations with the 1975 Israel–South Africa Agreement, which included alleged nuclear collaboration. Israel joined international sanctions against South Africa in the mid-1980s.

=== Other African states ===
Vorster's attitude towards other African countries was not so much a modification of strategy as a continuance of Verwoerd's approach. Vorster's forerunner had already become aware of the fact that cordial dealings with as many black states as possible was of paramount importance. As more and more African states acquired statehood from their colonial rulers, and as the Portuguese hold over neighboring Mozambique and Angola weakened, bitterness towards the South African apartheid system increased. If South Africa did not wish to become completely cut off from the rest of the African continent, she had to sustain associations with it, starting, of course, with mutual economic support. Vorster persisted with this strategy and built good relationships with a number of independent African states.

In 1967, Vorster proffered technological and fiscal counsel gratis to any African state prepared to receive it, asserting that absolutely no political strings were attached. He gave great attention to financial facets, aware of the fact that many African states were very run-down and would require financial aid in spite of their rebuffing of South Africa's racial principles. Malawi and Lesotho were the first countries to enter discussions with the NP government.

One of the first steps to take in initiating dealings was to convene with the heads of these African countries. Here Vorster worked decidedly contrary to Verwoerd's policies. Where Verwoerd had declined to get together and engage in dialogue with such leaders as Abubakar Tafawa Balewa of Nigeria in 1962 and Kenneth Kaunda of Zambia in 1964, Vorster, in 1966, met with the heads of the states of Lesotho, Swaziland and Botswana. There was still mutual suspicion, however, particularly after Vorster's denunciation of the Lusaka Manifesto in 1969. Botswana, Lesotho and Swaziland stayed candid critics of apartheid, but they hinged on South Africa's economic aid. This was inclusive of pecuniary credit and the fact that many natives from these states worked the South African mines.

Malawi was the first country not on South African borders to accept South African aid. She identified the monetary benefits of such a deal, for there were also many Malawians working in South African mines. In 1967, the two states delineated their political and economic relations, and, in 1969, Malawi became the only country at the assembly which did not sign the Lusaka Manifesto. In 1970, Malawian President Hastings Banda made his first and most successful official stopover in South Africa.

Associations with Mozambique followed suit and were sustained after that country won its sovereignty in 1975. Angola was also granted South African loans. Other countries which formed relationships with South Africa were Liberia, Côte d'Ivoire, Madagascar, Mauritius, Gabon, Zaire (now the Democratic Republic of the Congo), Ghana and the Central African Republic. These African states criticised apartheid (more than ever after South Africa's denunciation of the Lusaka Manifesto), but fiscal reliance on South Africa, together with fear of its military power, resulted in their forming the aforementioned ties.

== Effect of the Soweto uprising ==
Following the Soweto uprising in 1976 and its brutal suppression by the apartheid regime, the arms embargo was made mandatory by the UN Security Council on 4 November 1977 and South Africa became increasingly isolated internationally, with tough economic sanctions weighing heavily. Not all countries imposed or fully supported the sanctions, however; instead, they continued to benefit from trade with apartheid South Africa. During the 1980s, though, the number of countries opposing South Africa increased, and the economy came under tremendous strain.

== Isolation ==
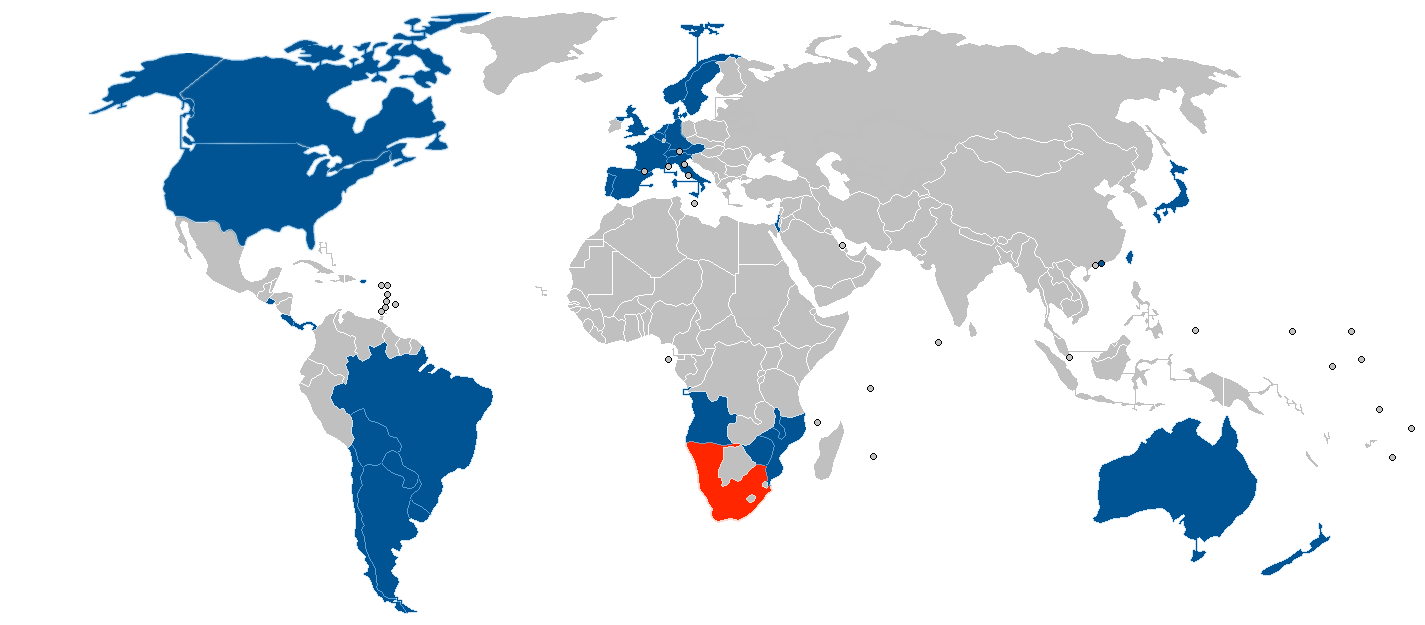
Apartheid South Africa (including South West Africa) Diplomatic missions of South Africa in 1974

While some countries and organizations, like the Swiss-South African Association, supported the Apartheid government, most of the international community isolated South Africa. One of the primary means for the international community to show its aversion to apartheid was to boycott South Africa in a variety of spheres of multinational life. Economic and military sanctions were among these, but cultural and sporting boycotts also found their way in. South Africa, in this way, was cut off from the rest of the globe. It also awakened the South African community to the opinions of other countries. Despite financial shunning causing significant harm to Black South Africans, the ANC proclaimed it as an essential means of achieving liberty. Cultural and sporting boycotts, on the other hand, did not have a negative effect on the lives of black people, as they were already barred from these by their own government.

=== Sports boycotts ===
Sporting seclusion commenced in the mid-1950s and increased through the 1960s. Apartheid forbade multiracial sport, which meant that overseas teams, by virtue of their having players of diverse races, could not play in South Africa. In 1956, the International Table Tennis Federation severed its ties with the all-white South African Table Tennis Union, preferring the non-racial South African Table Tennis Board in its stead. The apartheid government came back by confiscating the passports of the Board's players so that they were unable to attend international games. Other global sports unions followed the example, but they were sluggish in doing so.

In 1959, the non-racial South African Sports Association (SASA) was shaped to secure the rights of all players on the global field. After meeting with no success in its endeavours to attain credit by collaborating with white establishments, SASA went to the International Olympic Committee (IOC) in 1962, calling for South Africa's eviction from the Olympic Games. The IOC sent South Africa a caution to the effect that, if there were no changes, it would be barred from the 1964 games. The changes were initiated, and in January 1963, the South African Non-Racial Olympic Committee (SANROC) was set up. The Anti-Apartheid Movement persisted in its campaign for South Africa's exclusion, and the IOC acceded in barring the country from the 1964 Games in Tokyo. South Africa selected a multi-racial side for the next Games, and the IOC opted to include the country in the 1968 Games in Mexico. Because of protests from AAMs and African nations, however, the IOC was forced to retract the invitation, along with one for Rhodesia.

Foreign complaints about South Africa's bigoted sports brought more isolation. In 1960, Verwoerd barred a Māori rugby player from touring South Africa with the All Blacks, and the tour was cancelled. New Zealand made a decision not to convey an authorised rugby team to South Africa again.

B. J. Vorster took Verwoerd's place as PM in 1966 and declared that South Africa would no longer dictate to other countries what their teams should look like. Although this reopened the gate for sporting meets, it did not signal the end of South Africa's racist sporting policies. In 1968, Vorster went against his policy by refusing to permit Basil D'Oliveira, a Coloured South African-born cricketer, to join the English cricket team on its tour to South Africa. Vorster said that the side had been chosen only to prove a point, and not on merit. After protests, however, "Dolly" was eventually included in the team; see the D'Oliveira affair. Protests against certain tours brought about the cancellation of a number of other visits, like that of an England rugby team in 1969/70.

As sporting segregation persisted, it became obvious that South Africa would have to make further changes to its sporting policies if it was to be recognised on the international stage. More and more careers were impinged upon by segregation, and they began to stand up against apartheid. In 1971, Vorster altered his policies even further by distinguishing multiracial from multinational sport. Multiracial sport, between teams with players of different races, remained outlawed; multinational sport, however, was now acceptable: international sides would not be subject to South Africa's racial stipulations.

International censure of segregated sport and calls for sporting sanctions persisted. The UN would continue to hold them against South Africa until the end of apartheid. These measures did not bring an end to international sport for South African teams, but they added very much to the country's seclusion. The bans were revoked in 1993, when conciliations for a democratic South Africa were well under way.

=== Cultural boycotts ===
In the 1960s, the Anti-Apartheid Movement worldwide began to campaign for cultural boycotts of apartheid South Africa. Artists were requested not to present or let their works be hosted in South Africa. In 1963, 45 British writers put their signatures to an affirmation approving of the boycott, and, in 1964, American actor Marlon Brando called for a similar affirmation for films. In 1965, the Writers' Guild of Great Britain called for a proscription on the sending of films to South Africa. Over sixty American artists signed a statement against apartheid and against professional links with the state. The presentation of some South African plays in Britain and America was also vetoed. After the arrival of television in South Africa in 1975, the British Actors Union, Equity, boycotted the service, and no British program concerning its associates could be sold to South Africa. Sporting and cultural boycotts did not have the same impact as economic sanctions, but they did much to lift consciousness amongst normal South Africans of the global condemnation of apartheid.

These facets of social remoteness from the worldwide hamlet made apartheid a discomfiture and were most trying for sports and culture fans. These boycotts effectively egged on little changes to apartheid policy, and corroded white South Africans' dedication to it.

=== Political isolation and economic boycotts ===
Numerous conferences were held and the United Nations passed resolutions condemning South Africa, including the World Conference Against Racism in 1978 and 1983. A significant disinvestment movement started, pressuring investors to refuse to invest in South African companies or companies that did business with South Africa. South African sports teams were barred from participation in international events, and South African culture and tourism were boycotted.

Countries such as Zambia, Tanzania and the Soviet Union provided military support for the ANC and PAC. It was more difficult, though, for neighbouring states such as Botswana, Lesotho and Swaziland, because they were economically dependent on South Africa. Still, they did feed the struggle underground.

Ordinary people in foreign countries did much in protest against the apartheid government, too. The British Anti-Apartheid Movement was one of these, organising boycotts against South African sports teams, South African products such as wine and fruit, and British companies that traded with or in South Africa. Other organisations were formed to prevent musicians and the like from coming into the country, and others raised funds for the ANC and PAC.

After much debate, by the late 1980s the United States, the United Kingdom, and 23 other nations had passed laws placing various trade sanctions on South Africa. A divestment movement in many countries was similarly widespread, with individual cities and provinces around the world implementing various laws and local regulations forbidding registered corporations under their jurisdiction from doing business with South African firms, factories, or banks.

In an analysis of the effect of sanctions on South Africa by the FW de Klerk Foundation, it was argued that they were not a leading contributor to the political reforms leading to the end of Apartheid. The analysis concluded that in many instances sanctions undermined effective reform forces, such as the changing economic and social order within South Africa. Furthermore, it was argued that forces encouraging economic growth and development resulted in a more international and liberal outlook amongst South Africans, and were far more powerful agents of reform than sanctions.

== Western influence in anti-apartheid movement ==
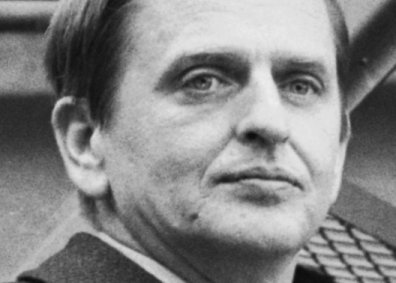
Swedish Prime Minister Olof Palme rallied international opposition to Apartheid

While international opposition to apartheid grew, the Nordic countries in particular provided both moral and financial support for the ANC. On 21 February 1986– a week before he was murdered– Sweden's prime minister Olof Palme made the keynote address to the Swedish People's Parliament Against Apartheid held in Stockholm. In addressing the hundreds of anti-apartheid sympathisers as well as leaders and officials from the ANC and the Anti-Apartheid Movement such as Oliver Tambo, Palme said Apartheid needed to be abolished, not reformed.

However, the country which provided the most support and aid to ending South African apartheid was Cuba, who helped train the armed wing of anti apartheid resistance. Their assistance to Angola, fighting for independence, in 1987 allowed for a weakening of South African apartheid forces, who were engaged in the conflict. Cuba also provided medical staff and assistance to black South Africans, which Nelson Mandela himself acknowledged and thanked Fidel Castro for upon his release. Mandela said that Cuba's support was not only in rhetoric, but with resources for the people of South Africa. When Mandela met Castro in 1991, he said "our friend Cuba, who helped us train our people, who gave us resources that helped us so much in our struggle".

Other Western countries adopted a more ambivalent position. In the 1980s, both the Reagan and Thatcher administrations in the US and UK followed a 'constructive engagement' policy with the apartheid government, vetoing the imposition of UN economic sanctions on South Africa, as they both fiercely believed in free trade and saw South Africa as a bastion against Marxist forces in Southern Africa. Thatcher declared the ANC a terrorist organisation, and in 1987 her spokesman, Bernard Ingham, said that anyone who believed that the ANC would ever form the government of South Africa was "living in cloud cuckoo land".

By the late 1980s, however, with the tide of the Cold War turning and no sign of a political resolution in South Africa, Western patience with the apartheid government began to run out. By 1989, the "lame duck" year of Reagan as a president, a bipartisan Republican/Democratic initiative in the US favoured economic sanctions (realised as the Comprehensive Anti-Apartheid Act), the release of Nelson Mandela and a negotiated settlement involving the ANC. Thatcher too began to take a similar line, but insisted on the suspension of the ANC's armed struggle.

== South West Africa ==
Separate from the issue of apartheid was a major quarrel between the UN and South Africa about the management of South West Africa. After World War I, all German colonies were made mandates of the League of Nations, the UN's forebear. Direction of these mandates was allotted to certain countries. The Treaty of Versailles declared German South West Africa a League of Nations Mandate under South African administration, and it then became known as South West Africa.

Walvis Bay was annexed by the British Empire in 1878 and incorporated into the Cape Colony in 1884. It thus became part of the Union of South Africa in 1910. In 1915 the Union occupied German South West Africa at the request of the Allied powers. South Africa was granted a "C" Class mandate by the League of Nations to administer this former German colony as an integral part of South Africa. The South African government transferred administration of Walvis Bay to South West Africa in 1922 but would in 1977 transfer it back to Cape Province.

After the configuration of the UN in 1945, and the transfer of mandates from the League of Nations to the new body, the arrangement changed: former obligatory powers (vis-à-vis those in charge of ex-German colonies) were now obliged to form new concurrences with the U.N. over their management of the mandates. South Africa, however, refused, declining to allow the territory to move towards independence. The National Party government argued that, for a quarter of a century, South-West Africa had been directed as a piece of South Africa, and the preponderance of South-West Africans wanted to become South Africans anyway. Instead, South-West Africa was treated as a de facto "fifth province" of the Union. The South African government turned this mandate arrangement into a military occupation, and extended apartheid to South-West Africa.

The UN attempted to compel South Africa to let go of the mandate, and, in 1960, Liberia and Ethiopia requested that the International Court of Justice announce that South Africa's management of South West Africa was illegitimate. They argued that South Africa was bringing apartheid to South-West Africa, too. South Africa was formally accused of maladministration, and the lawsuit, commencing in November 1960, lasted almost six years. The International Court's verdict astonished the UN: it ruled that Liberia and Ethiopia had no right to take issue with South Africa's deeds in South-West Africa. The Court did not, however, pass judgement on whether or not South Africa still had a mandate over the region. The UN declared that the mandate was indeed concluded, and a council of the UN was to run the state until its independence in 1968. South Africa rebuffed the resolution, but declared its ostensible intention to ready South-West Africa for independence.

Anxiety increased when the UN Council for South-West Africa was declined admission, and steepened still further when South Africa indicted 35 South-West Africans and then found them guilty of terror campaigns. The UN reproached South Africa and declared that South-West Africa would thenceforth be known as Namibia. At the New York Accords in 1988, South Africa finally signed the agreement that granted the country its independence.

The UN allowed the South African government back in 1994, however the South African government had to first show that they had undertaken certain measures to get rid of the racial judgement. Soon after the South African government created the Truth and Reconciliation Commission, which was supposed to aid the transition from Apartheid to Democracy.

== Border War ==
By 1966, SWAPO launched guerilla raids from neighbouring countries against South Africa's occupation of South-West Africa/Namibia. Initially South Africa fought a counter-insurgency war against SWAPO. But this conflict deepened after Angola gained its independence in 1975 under Communist leadership, the MPLA, and South Africa promptly challenged them, allying with the Angolan rival party, UNITA. By the end of the 1970s, Cuba had joined the fray, in one of several late Cold War flashpoints throughout Southern Africa. This developed into a conventional war between South Africa and UNITA on one side against the Angolan government, the Cuban Revolutionary Armed Forces, the Soviet Union, and SWAPO on the other side.

=== Total onslaught ===
By 1980, as international opinion turned decisively against the apartheid regime, the government and much of the white population increasingly looked upon the country as a bastion besieged by communism and radical black nationalists. Considerable effort was put into circumventing sanctions, and the government even went so far as to develop nuclear weapons, allegedly with the help of Israel. South Africa is the only country to date to have developed and voluntarily relinquished a nuclear arsenal.

Negotiating majority rule with the ANC was not considered an option (at least publicly), and it left the government to defend the country against external and internal threats through sheer military might. A siege mentality developed among whites, and, although many believed that a civil war against the black majority could not possibly be won, they preferred this to "giving in" to political reform. Brutal police and military actions seemed entirely justifiable. Paradoxically, the international sanctions that cut whites off from the rest of the world enabled black leaders to develop sophisticated political skills as those in exile forged ties with both regional and world leaders.

P. W. Botha initiated a policy of "Total Onslaught, Total Strategy", whereby reform was mixed with repression. With big businesses (affected by apartheid policies) ardently desirous of change, the government established two important commissions of enquiry. The Riekert Commission concluded that black people ought to be allowed to buy their own homes in urban areas, while the Wiehahn Commission dictated that black trade unions be given more freedom, more money be spent on black education and some apartheid legislation be abolished.

The Prohibition of Mixed Marriages Act was repealed, while the pass laws and employment colour bar were relaxed. Fewer people were arrested for offences pertaining to the latter as segregation in everyday life was gradually lessened. The government also gave so-called "independence" to a number of the homelands, but this seems to have been in part due to the fact that, as foreign citizens, their people could no longer expect anything from the South African government. Indeed, none of these reforms lessened the power of the white minority.

The term "front-line states" referred to countries in Southern Africa geographically near South Africa. Although these front-line states were all opposed to apartheid, many were economically dependent on South Africa. In 1980, they formed the Southern African Development Coordination Conference (SADCC), the aim of which was to promote economic development in the region and hence reduce dependence on South Africa. Furthermore, many SADCC members also allowed the exiled ANC and PAC to establish bases in their countries.

Other African countries also contributed to the fall of apartheid. In 1978, Nigeria boycotted the Commonwealth Games because New Zealand's sporting contacts with the South African government were not considered to be in accordance with the 1977 Gleneagles Agreement. Nigeria also led the 32-nation boycott of the 1986 Commonwealth Games because of British prime minister Margaret Thatcher's ambivalent attitude towards sporting links with South Africa, significantly affecting the quality and profitability of the Games and thus thrusting apartheid into the international spotlight.

== Cross-border raids ==
South Africa, facing a classic Cold War insurgency threat backed by conventional means in the background, followed a military strategy based on offensive area defence, organised in layers. In this regard, it organised its home territory in Military Commands, sub divided into Groups, and the Groups were populated by operational Battalions, also in the then South-West Africa. Area defence and protection of "Home and Hearth" was the responsibility of the unique "Commando" system, integrated with the military Groups. (This system emanates from the old Boer Republics and refers to a system of Citizen's Defence.) This deployment pattern provided depth in defence, tactical mobility and flexibility and integrated area coverage. Military Operations were always based on good operational and strategic intelligence, and the defensive deployments on border areas were augmented where required by offensive cross – border pre - emptive strikes by Special Forces, Special Operations Units and the South African Air Force (SAAF). The purpose of these strikes always was to either pursue fleeing infiltrators back to their base areas, or to pre – emptively strike and prevent insurgent infiltrations and potential damage and loss of life. This strategy was based on a customised format of Counterinsurgency (COIN) warfare, generally accepted in the Western World during the Cold War and beyond, even recently in Afganistan.

In South-West Africa, the same principle was applied, also under the later "South-West Africa Territorial Force" where the area was organised in depth in several Military Sectors, ie "Sector 10 and Sector 20" on the border with Angola, whilst various others were organised to take care of the deeper defence and protection. The Border Sectors were populated by permanently deployed Operational Battalions such as 51, 52, 53 and 54 Battalions providing Border Protection in Sector 10, and various other in Sector 20 towards the East. Intelligence operations in the rear areas, the border areas and the areas of trans border military responsibility and influence were intensely conducted by specialist units and technical capacity. As the South-west Africa People's Organisation's (SWAPO) military wing, People's Liberation Army of Namibia (PLAN) was a well organised, funded and equipped insurgent Army, and respected as such by the South African Army, it created a formidable military threat. In this regard, PLAN perpetually threatened the border regions by insurgent type offensive actions, which included intimidation, extortion and terrorising the local population. similarly, the South African Army units, organised as described above, countered the threat aggressively and regularly struck deep into Angola to disrupt and destroy SWAPO's logistics and Command and Control and to degrade its fighting capacity. As the strategic objective of the time (Based on the firm belief that SWAPO as a Communist - influenced organisation would institute a Communist Soviet - aligned government in South-West Africa) was to avoid Namibia falling into the hands of a SWAPO government on the border with South Africa, the South African government supported UNITA in its war against the communist MPLA foes. This was as part of a concerted effort by the West to oppose Soviet efforts to expand its control in Southern Africa. This led to the second dimension of this conflict, where the South African Government, at first covertly and later openly, supported UNITA in its fight against the MPLA. Based on the explanation above, South Africa had a policy to attack terrorist bases in neighbouring countries. These attacks were mainly aimed at ANC, PAC and SWAPO guerrilla-bases and safe houses in retaliation for acts of terror – like bomb explosions, massacres and guerrilla actions (like sabotage) by ANC, PAC and Swapo guerrillas in South Africa and Namibia. Attacks were also conducted as pre - emptive strikes based on confirmed, actionable intelligence. The country also aided organisations in surrounding countries who were actively combatting the spread of communism in Southern Africa. The results of these policies included:

- Support for anti-government guerrilla groups such as UNITA in Angola and RENAMO in Mozambique
- South African Defence Force (SADF; now the South African National Defence Force; SANDF) hit-squad raids into front-line states. Bombing raids were also conducted into neighbouring states.
- A full-scale invasion of Angola: this was partly in support of UNITA, but was also an attempt to strike at SWAPO bases.
- Attacks in other frontline states: including Botswana and Zambia, condemned in Security Council resolutions.
- Targeting of exiled ANC leaders abroad: Joe Slovo's wife Ruth First was killed by a parcel bomb in Maputo, and 'death squads' of the Civil Co-operation Bureau and the Directorate of Military Intelligence attempted to carry out assassinations on ANC targets in Brussels, Paris and Stockholm, as well as burglaries and bombings in London.

In 1984, Mozambican president Samora Machel signed the Nkomati Accord with South Africa's president P.W. Botha, in an attempt to rebuild Mozambique's economy. South Africa agreed to cease supporting anti-government forces, while the MK was prohibited from operating in Mozambique. This was an awful setback for the ANC.

In 1986 President Machel himself was killed in an air crash in mountainous terrain near the South African border after returning from a meeting in Zambia. South Africa was accused of continuing its aid to RENAMO and having caused the crash using a new advanced electronic beacon capable of luring aircraft into crashing. This was never proven and is still a subject of great controversy. The South African Margo Commission found that the crash was an accident while a Soviet delegation issued a minority report implicating South Africa.

== See also ==
- International sanctions during apartheid
- Military history of South Africa
- South Africa under apartheid
- Sporting boycott of South Africa during the apartheid era
