= Sam Morris (activist) =

Samson "Sam" Uriah Morris (14 October 1908–25 April 1976) was a Grenada-born educationalist, anti-colonialist and civil rights activist who came to London in 1939, becoming deputy chair for the Commission for Racial Equality in the 1970s.

== Biography ==
Morris was born in St Andrew's, Grenada, in 1908 and received part of his education in Barbados at Codrington College. In 1939, he sailed to the United Kingdom, and served in the British Army for two and a half years. He subsequently became active in the League of Coloured Peoples — which was formed by Harold Moody and was concerned with racial equality and civil rights in Britain and elsewhere in the world — becoming general secretary of the organisation in 1945. Morris participated in several BBC programmes, including Calling the West Indies and Caribbean Voices.

He was a Liaison Officer to Learie Constantine in the Welfare Department of the Colonial Office during the Second World War. In 1953 Morris left Britain for Africa and worked on Radio Ghana before becoming a private secretary and press officer to Kwame Nkrumah in Ghana for eight years, returning to the UK in 1967. He was then the Development Officer for the Midlands with the National Committee for Commonwealth Immigrants. He later became Assistant High Commissioner for Grenada and deputy chair for the Commission for Racial Equality. He lived in Hammersmith and was an active member of the Hammersmith and Fulham Council for Racial Equality. He died in June 1976 in Fulham, London.

== Selected writings ==
- "My Tribute to the Late George Padmore", Accra Evening News, 3 October 1959.
- "Tribute to Learie Constantine", New Community, 1, 1 (October 1971), pp. 68–70.
- "Moody — the forgotten visionary", New Community (Vol. 1, No. 3, Spring 1972), pp. 193–96.
- The Case and the Course: A Treatise on Black Studies (London: Committee on Black Studies 1973).

== Legacy ==
The Sam Uriah Morris Society had a centre in Hackney, East London which housed an exhibition about black history.
