= Delia Jarrett-Macauley =

British writer, academic and broadcaster

Delia Jarrett-Macauley FRSA
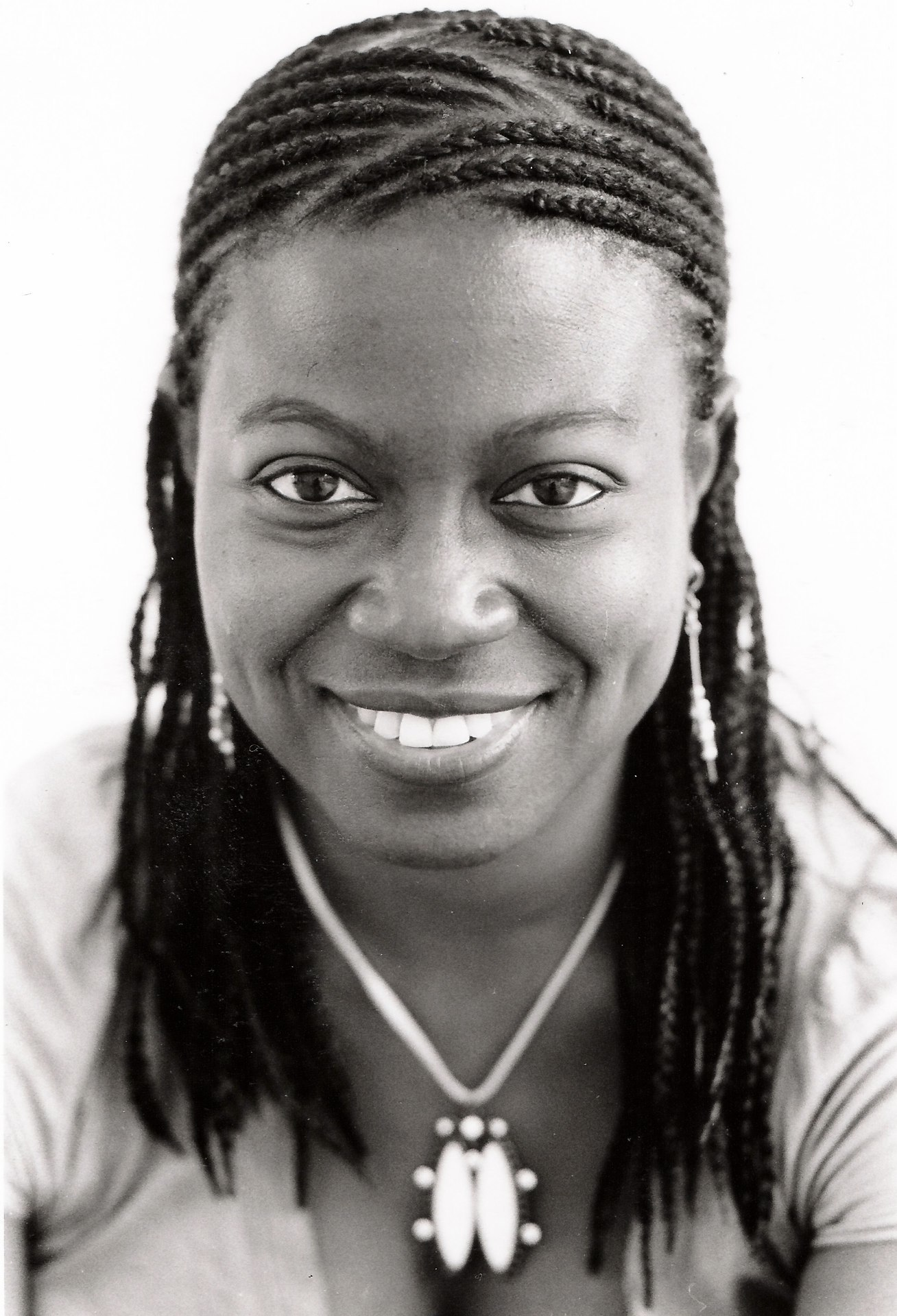
- Born: Hertfordshire, England
- Other name: Dee Jarrett-Macauley
- Education: Royal Holloway, University of London; University of Kent
- Occupations: Writer; academic; broadcaster
- Notable work: The Life of Una Marson, 1905–65 (1998); Moses, Citizen & Me (2005)
- Awards: Orwell Prize
- Website: deliajarrettmacauley.com

Delia Jarrett-Macauley FRSA, also known as Dee Jarrett-Macauley, is a London-based British writer, academic and broadcaster of Sierra Leonean heritage. Her debut novel, Moses, Citizen & Me, won the 2006 Orwell Prize for political writing, the first novel to have been awarded the prize. She has devised and presented features on BBC Radio, as well as being a participant in a range of programmes. As a multi-disciplinary scholar in history, literature and cultural politics, she has taught at Leeds University, Birkbeck, University of London, and other educational establishments, most recently as a fellow in English at the University of Warwick. She is also a business and arts consultant, specialising in organisation development.

== Early years and education ==
Delia Jarrett-Macauley was born in Hertfordshire, England, to Sierra Leone Creole parents, their youngest daughter, and she visited Sierra Leone as a child. She studied at York College for Girls and Harrogate Grammar School and earned her first degree in management and a Doctor of Philosophy degree in English from London University.

== Career: cultural sector and academia ==
Jarrett-Macauley began working in the cultural sector in the mid-1980s, including as Director of the Independent Theatre Council, and as a consultant to Arts Council England. She also managed the pan-African dance summer school and co-ordinated educational projects for African Players. In the 1990s she was joint director of the Royal National Theatre's project "Transmission", which focused on arts and social change in Europe. She has also judged prizes, served on the boards and been closely involved with a number of other cultural and literary initiatives, among them the Caine Prize for African Writing in 2007 as well as in 2016, when she was chair of the judging panel. In July 2016 Jarrett-Macauley was appointed chair of the Caine Prize board of trustees, stepping down in April 2019, when her successor was named as Ellah Wakatama Allfrey.

Her university teaching career began in 1989, when she ran the first black women's studies courses on the MA in women's studies at the University of Kent. Based on that programme of work, she subsequently edited the 1996 anthology Reconstructing Womanhood, Reconstructing Feminism: Writings on Black Women, the first British feminist anthology to examine concepts of womanhood and feminism within the context of "race" and ethnicity. She also devised and led the arts management programme at Birkbeck College, London.

She has been a visiting fellow in gender studies at the London School of Economics (LSE) and has taught a range of courses at the Universities of Kent, London and Middlesex. She has also trained teachers at Goldsmiths College, London, and has contributed to many professional development courses in Europe at a range of institutions, including the Amsterdam Summer University and (in association with the European Cultural Foundation) the King Baudouin Foundation (Brussels) and the European Network of Cultural Administration Training Centres.

Jarrett-Macauley has contributed to a number of academic publications as author and board member, including Feminist Review, Women's History Review, Journal of Gender Studies, and Gender and History. She is a contributor to the 2019 anthology New Daughters of Africa, edited by Margaret Busby. In October 2018 it was announced that Jarrett-Macauley was included in the 2019 edition of the Powerlist, ranking the 100 most influential Black Britons.

Jarrett-Macauley has also edited Shakespeare, Race and Performance: The Diverse Bard in Contemporary Britain (June 2016), with contributors who include Eldred Durosimi Jones, Jatinder Verma, Naseem Khan, Dawn Monique Williams, Michael Pearce, Lynette Goddard, Varsha Panjwani, Jami Rogers, Michael McMillan, Iqbal Khan, Diane Allison-Mitchell, Pat Cumper, Sita Thomas, and Terri Power.

In 2016 Jarrett-Macauley was on the London Book Fair delegation to China, where she spoke at The Shanghai International Book Fair and at various events in Beijing, including the Beijing Book Fair's Cultural Industries Forum. She was also filmed for the British Council's "Walking the cities" series in Rome.

== Writing ==
Jarrett-Macauley has written two significant books: The Life of Una Marson, 1905–65 (first published in 1998) and the novel Moses, Citizen & Me (2005).

=== The Life of Una Marson, 1905–65 ===
She is the author of a well received biography of the BBC's first black programme-maker, Una Marson. Chris Searle, reviewing it in Tribune wrote: "Delia Jarrett-Macauley is to be congratulated in creating this finely written, detailed, narrative which opens up black life from an era often untouched by the written word". Margaret Busby referred to it in The Sunday Times as "compelling", with other appreciative feedback coming from Stewart Brown of the University of Birmingham ("thoroughly researched and well documented"), Caroline Benn ("An excellent biography"), John Thieme of the University of Hull ("A work of sustained and original scholarship"), Hakim Adi ("Delia Jarrett-Macauley has done a great service"), Kevin Le Gendre for the Independent on Sunday ("genuinely inspiring"), Sheila Rowbotham ("a scholarly work, deftly written"), while Stuart Hall praised it as "a significant contribution to the work of historical memory".

=== Moses, Citizen & Me ===
Jarrett-Macauley's 2005 novel takes as its subject matter the conflict in Sierra Leone, drawing imaginatively on "both the European canon and African oral traditions to illuminate the sufferings of child soldiers and their families". The book was widely and positively reviewed, including by such as Aminatta Forna ("A deeply affecting and vividly told story of ordinary people with the courage to survive.... A wonderful book"), Bernardine Evaristo in Wasafiri ("This is a very serious and significant choice of subject matter for a debut novel; ambitiously rendered, it proves fertile and potent ground for fiction."), Francis Wheen ("An extraordinary novel about war, childhood, art and salvation. Shakespearean tragedy recast in modern Africa, transformed into a redemptive vision as magical as a midsummer night's dream."), while Lucy Beresford remarked in The Literary Review: "...her understated prose a foil to the bleak and disturbing subject matter. ...sensitively establishes the family as a microcosm of the ruptured nation.... and Shakespeare provides an inspirational and uplifting agent of therapy."

In the Guardian, Ali Smith commented on "the considered and multi-layered story of a Sierra Leone family blasted apart by one of its children turning boy soldier in the civil war. It is a novel remarkable for its slowed, measured pulse and its calm analysis, its keenness to promise hope and rehabilitation even after the worst", and Maya Jaggi wrote : "Seven years ago Delia Jarrett-Macauley published The Life of Una Marson 1906-65, a landmark biography of the Jamaican feminist who became the BBC's first black programme maker. In her debut novel, Jarrett-Macauley again breaks ground with a delicate and brave, if over-ambitious, fictional treatment of child soldiers in the aftermath of a west African civil war....as a deftly sensitive exploration of a tormented generation, and a family's dilemma, it is a haunting piece of fiction."

Moses, Citizen & Me was awarded the Orwell Prize in 2006, with the judges concluding: "It is a work of great intimacy and moral complexity, the kind of writing that sheds light on a world we barely understand...the book is one that Orwell himself might have liked."

In 2008, following the publication of A Long Way Gone: Memoirs of a Boy Soldier, a bestselling first-hand account by Ishmael Beah of his time as a child soldier during the civil war in Sierra Leone in the 1990s, the accuracy of which was questioned, there was also some discussion about the memoir's alleged similarity in parts to Jarrett-Macauley's novel.

== Broadcasting ==
Jarrett-Macauley has worked on a number of broadcasting projects for BBC Radio, including devising and presenting The Una Marson Story (BBC Radio 3) and Black Women Writers in 1930s England on BBC Radio 4. In 2006 she made the Radio 4 feature Imaginary Homeland, for which she returned to Sierra Leone after 30 years, and the programme "interweaves her memories and her fiction with the real struggle to rebuild the place known as Salone". She has also contributed to other BBC programmes such as Woman's Hour and Open Book on Radio 4, the Radio 3 website on Ideas and Culture and the 2004 BBC Music Live Festival. She voiced Warrior Marks, Alice Walker's documentary film, which was shown on UK television (based on the 1993 book of the same title about female genital mutilation).

In 2022, Lenny Henry's production company, Douglas Road Productions, made a television documentary entitled Una Marson, Our Lost Caribbean Voice, broadcast on BBC Two, in which Jarrett-Macauley asks: "How could we have let someone of Una Marson's calibre just disappear?"

== Bibliography ==
- The Life of Una Marson, 1905–65, Manchester University Press (1998, 2010), ISBN 9780719082566.
- Moses, Citizen & Me – novel, Granta Books (2005), ISBN 186207741X. Winner of the Orwell Prize 2006.

As editor

- Reconstructing Womanhood, Reconstructing Feminism: Writings on Black Women, Routledge (1996), ISBN 041511649X.
- Shakespeare, Race and Performance: The Diverse Bard in Contemporary Britain, Routledge (2016), ISBN 978-1138913820.
