= Lord Chamberlain's plays =

Collection of plays held by the British Library

The Lord Chamberlain's plays are a collection of manuscripts held by the British Library comprising scripts of all new plays in Britain that needed to be approved for performance by the Lord Chamberlain, a senior official of the British royal household, between 1824 and 1968. This was a requirement of both the Licensing Act 1737 and the Theatres Act 1843, though his office was not legally entitled to retain the texts until 1912.

The collection represents an extensive and unusual research resource curated through censorship of the theatrical medium and also includes letters and administrative documents that provide an insight to the censorship process.

== History ==
The Master of the Revels had overseen theatrical performance since 1545 with the Lord Chamberlain becoming involved in censorship after the Stuart Restoration in 1660. In 1737, responding to satirical performances critical of his government, Robert Walpole introduced statutory censorship through the Licensing Act 1737, which appointed the Lord Chamberlain as the official theatrical censor. The act immediately closed all but two legitimate theatres (theatres allowed to stage serious drama as opposed to pantomime etc.) in London – Covent Garden and Drury Lane – and gave the Lord Chamberlain the power to prevent any new play from being performed for any reason.

The Theatres Act 1843, also known as the Theatres Regulation Bill, replaced the previous act and implemented proposals made by a select committee of the House of Commons in 1832. Under the new act, the Lord Chamberlain retained the role of censor albeit with slightly restricted powers to only prohibit the performance of plays that were likely 'to do violence to the sentiment of religious reverence', to be indecent, or 'to be calculated to conduce to crime or vice'. On these matters the Lord Chamberlain's office would occasionally consult the Archbishop of Canterbury.

Manuscripts were returned to the Lord Chamberlain's Department from the Public Record Office in 1923 with plays dated between 1824 and 1850 later deposited at the British Library. In 1988 papers relating to the censors' examination were also deposited at the British Library. The earliest plays submitted in 1824 had been sold in 1825 and were passed to the Huntington Library in the United States in 1917.

The Theatres Act 1968 finally abolished theatrical censorship in Britain.

== A unique historical archive ==
Through anti-theatrical prejudice and the act of censorship the Lord Chamberlain's plays have left an extensive historical archive of material that may otherwise have been lost. As such, the archive provides a valuable research resource that highlights contemporary social mores and attitudes to race or homosexuality, and the conviction that performance can have a contagious effect.

The comments made about A Patriot For Me by John Osborne submitted for licensing in 1964 reveal contemporary homophobia and the concern that its depiction could have an infectious effect noting that 'presenting homosexuals in their most attractive guise – dressed as pretty women, will to some degree cause the congregation of homosexuals and provide the means whereby the vice may be acquired'.

The archive also curates early Black theatre in Britain including the only known manuscript copy of At What a Price by Una Marson which explores themes of women's desire, interracial relations and sexual harassment in the workplace. Now relatively obscure, Marson had moved from Jamaica to London in the 1930s and was well known at the time as a BBC broadcaster, poet, playwright and anti-racist activist.
