= The Keys (journal) =

British magazine

The Keys was the quarterly journal of the League of Coloured Peoples founded in 1933. It took its title from James Aggrey's parable that used the black and white keys of the piano as an image of racial harmony. The journal ceased publication in 1939.
