= Una Marson =

Jamaican writer and activist (1905–1965)

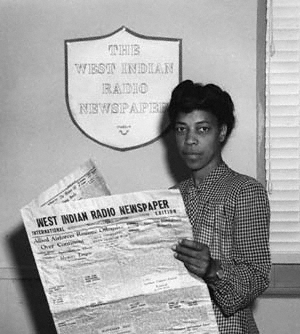
- Marson reading a copy of The West Indian Radio Newspaper, during WWII
- Born: Una Maud Victoria Marson; 6 February 1905; Santa Cruz, Colony of Jamaica, British Empire
- Died: 6 May 1965 (aged 60); Kingston, Jamaica
- Occupations: Writer and activist
- Known for: Producer of Caribbean Voices on BBC World Service

Una Maud Victoria Marson (6 February 1905 – 6 May 1965) was a Jamaican feminist, activist and writer, producing poems, plays, and radio programmes.

She travelled to London in 1932 and became the first Black woman to be employed by the BBC, during World War II. In 1942, she became producer of the programme Calling the West Indies, turning it into Caribbean Voices, which became an important forum for Caribbean literary work.

Her biographer Delia Jarrett-Macauley described her (in The Life of Una Marson, 1905–1965) as the first "Black British feminist to speak out against racism and sexism in Britain". British civil rights leader Billy Strachan credited Una Marson with educating him on political and racial issues.

== Early years, 1905–1932 ==
Una Marson was born on 6 February 1905, at Sharon Mission House, Sharon village, near Santa Cruz, Jamaica, in the parish of St Elizabeth, as the youngest of six children of Baptist parson Solomon Isaac Marson (1858–1916) and his wife Ada Wilhelmina Mullins (1863–1922). She had a middle-class upbringing and was very close to her father, who influenced some of her fatherlike characters in her later works. As a child before going to school, Marson was an avid reader of available literature, which at the time was mostly English classical literature.

At the age of 10, Marson was enrolled in Hampton High, a girl's boarding school in Jamaica of which her father was on the board of trustees. However, her father died that year, leaving the family with financial problems, so they moved to Kingston. She finished school at Hampton High, but did not go on to a college education. After leaving Hampton, she found work in Kingston as a volunteer social worker and used the secretarial skills, such as stenography, she had learned in school, her first job being with the Salvation Army.

In 1926, Marson was appointed assistant editor of the Jamaican political journal Jamaica Critic. Her years there taught her journalism skills as well as influenced her political and social opinions and inspired her to create her own publication; in 1928, she became Jamaica's first female editor, and publisher of her own magazine, The Cosmopolitan, which printed articles on feminist topics, local social issues, and workers' rights, and was aimed at a young, middle-class Jamaican audience. Marson's articles encouraged women to join the workforce and to become politically active. The magazine also published Jamaican poetry and literature by Marson's fellow members of the Jamaican Poetry League, started by J. E. Clare McFarlane.

In 1930, Marson published her first collection of poems, entitled Tropic Reveries, that dealt with love and nature with elements of feminism. It won the Musgrave Medal from the Institute of Jamaica. Her poems about love are somewhat misunderstood by friends and critics, as there is no evidence of a romantic relationship in Marson's life, although love continued to be a common topic in her work. In 1931, due to financial difficulties, The Cosmopolitan ceased publication, which led her to begin publishing more poetry and plays. In 1931, she published another collection of poetry, entitled Heights and Depths, which also dealt with love and social issues. Also in 1931, she wrote her first play, At What a Price, about a Jamaican girl who moves from the country into the city of Kingston to work as a stenographer and falls in love with her white male boss. The play opened in Jamaica and later in London to critical acclaim. In 1932, she decided to go to London to find a broader audience for her work and to experience life outside Jamaica.

== London, 1932–1936 ==
When she first arrived in the UK in 1932, Marson found the colour bar restricted her ability to find work, and she campaigned against it. She stayed in Peckham, south-east London, at the home of Harold Moody, who the year before had founded civil-rights organisation The League of Coloured Peoples. The League sponsored a production of Marson's play At What a Price in London in the winter of 1932–33. First staged in Kingston, Jamaica, in 1932, this four-act drama explores the experiences of Ruth Maitland, a young woman who leaves behind her family home in the countryside and moves to Kingston to become a stenographer in the office of a white English businessman named Gerald Fitzroy. He pursues her relentlessly, and Ruth becomes pregnant. She returns to the family home, where a long-time admirer proposes marriage. The play explores women's desires—for love and for a career, as well as interracial relations, sexual harassment in the workplace, and women's friendship. It opened at the YWCA Central Club Hall in London on 23 November 1933. It ran for a further four nights in January 1934 at the Scala Theatre on Charlotte Street and Tottenham Court Road. Critics noted the diverse origins and accents of the Black cast who played all twenty roles (including the two white roles), which included activists and artists from Bermuda, British Guiana, England, Gold Coast, India, Italy, Jamaica and St. Lucia. From 1932 to 1945, Marson moved back and forth between London and Jamaica. She continued to contribute to politics, but now instead of focusing on writing for magazines, she wrote for newspapers and her own literary works in order to get her political ideas across. In these years, Marson kept writing to advocate feminism, but one of her new emphases was on the race issue in England.

The racism and sexism she found in the UK "transformed both her life and her poetry": the voice in her poetry became more focused on the identity of black women in England. In this period, Marson not only continued to write about women's roles in society, but also put into the mix the issues faced by black people who lived in England. In July 1933, she wrote a poem called "Nigger" that was published in the League of Coloured Peoples' journal, The Keys, on which she worked in an editorial capacity and became Editor for in 1935.

Outside of her writing at that time, Marson was in the London branch of the International Alliance of Women, a global feminist organization. By 1935, she was involved with the International Alliance of Women based in Istanbul.

== Jamaica, 1936–1938 ==
Marson returned to Jamaica in 1936, where one of her goals was to promote national literature. One step she took in achieving this goal was to help create the Kingston Readers and Writers Club, as well as the Kingston Drama Club. She also founded the Jamaica Save the Children Fund, an organization that raised funds to give poorer children money for a basic education.

In promoting Jamaican literature, Marson published Moth and the Star in 1937. Many poems in that volume argue that, despite the media's portrayal that black women were less beautiful than white women, they should be confident about their own beauty. This theme is seen in "Cinema Eyes", "Little Brown Girl", "Black is Fancy" and "Kinky Hair Blues". Marson herself had been affected by the stereotype of superior white beauty; her biographer tells us that within months of her arrival in Britain she "stopped straightening her hair and went natural".

Going along with her feminist principles, Marson worked with Louise Bennett to create another play called London Calling, which was about a woman who moved to London to further her education, but later became homesick and returned to Jamaica. This play shows how the main character is a "strong heroine" for being able to "force herself to return to London" in order to finish her education there. Also in the feminist vein, Marson wrote Public Opinion, contributing to the feminist column.

Marson's third play, Pocomania, is about a woman named Stella who is looking for an exciting life. Critics suggest that this play is significant because it demonstrates how an "Afro-religious cult" affects middle-class women. Pocomania is also one of Marson's most important works because she was able to put the essence of Jamaican culture into it. Critics such as Ivy Baxter said that "Pocomania was a break in tradition because it talked about a cult from the country", and, as such, it represented a turning point in what was acceptable on the stage.

In 1937, Marson wrote a poem called "Quashie comes to London", which is the perspective of England in a Caribbean narrative. In Caribbean dialect, quashie means gullible or unsophisticated. Although initially impressed, Quashie becomes disgusted with England because there is not enough good food there. The poem shows how, although England has good things to offer, it is Jamaican culture that Quashie misses, and therefore Marson implies that England is supposed to be "the temporary venue for entertainment". The poem shows how it was possible for a writer to implement Caribbean dialect in a poem, and it is this usage of local dialect that situates Quashie's perspective of England as a Caribbean perspective.

== London, 1938–1945 ==
Marson returned to London in 1938 to continue work on the Jamaican Save the Children project that she started in Jamaica, and also to be on the staff of the Jamaican Standard. In March 1940, Marson published an article entitled "We Want Books – But Do We Encourage Our Writers?" in Public Opinion, a political weekly, in an effort to spur Caribbean nationalism through literature. In 1941, she was hired by the BBC Empire Service to work on the programme Calling the West Indies, in which World War II soldiers would have their messages read on the radio to their families, becoming the producer of the programme by 1942.

During the same year, Marson turned the programme into Caribbean Voices, as a forum in which Caribbean literary work was read over the radio. Through this show, Marson met people such as J. E. Clare McFarlane, Vic Reid, Andrew Salkey, Langston Hughes, James Weldon Johnson, Jomo Kenyatta, Haile Selassie, Marcus Garvey, Amy Garvey, Nancy Cunard, Sylvia Pankhurst, Winifred Holtby, Paul Robeson, John Masefield, Louis MacNeice, T. S. Eliot, Tambimuttu and George Orwell. Orwell helped Marson edit the programme before she turned it into Caribbean Voices. She also established a firm friendship with Mary Treadgold, who eventually took over her role when Marson returned to Jamaica. However, "despite these experiences and personal connections, there is a strong sense, in Marson's poetry and in Jarrett-Macauley's biography The Life of Una Marson], that Marson remained something of an isolated and marginal figure".

Marson's radio programme, Caribbean Voices, was subsequently produced by Henry Swanzy, who took over after she returned to Jamaica.

== After World War II ==
Details of Marson's life are limited, and those pertaining to her personal and professional life post-1945 are particularly elusive. In 1945, she published a poetry collection entitled Towards the Stars. This marked a shift in the focus of her poetry: while she once wrote about female sadness over lost love, poems from Towards the Stars were much more focused on the independent woman. Her efforts outside of her writing seem to work in collaboration with these sentiments, though conflicting stories offer little concrete evidence about exactly what she did.

Sources differ in outlining Marson's personal life during this time. Author Erika J. Waters states that Marson was a secretary for the Pioneer Press, a publishing company in Jamaica for Jamaican authors. This source believes that she then moved in the 1950s to Washington, DC, US, where she met and married a dentist named Peter Staples. The couple are reported to have divorced, allowing Marson to travel to England, Israel, then back to Jamaica; following a heart attack, she died aged 60 in May 1965, at St. Josephs Hospital, Kingston, and was buried on 10 May at the Half-Way-Tree Parish Cemetery.

Another source, written by Lee M. Jenkins, offers a very different take on Marson's personal life and says that Marson was sent to a mental hospital following a breakdown during the years 1946–49. After being discharged, Marson founded the Pioneer Press. This source claims that she spent a period in the 1950s in the US, where she had another breakdown and was admitted to St. Elizabeth's Asylum. Following this, Marson returned to Jamaica, where she rallied against Rastafarian discrimination. She then went to Israel for a women's conference, an experience that she discussed in her last BBC radio broadcast for Woman's Hour.

The conflicting details regarding Marson's personal life show that there is very little information available about her. For example, Waters' article quotes Marson's criticisms of Porgy and Bess, yet provides no citation for this work. In combination with this is the limited record of her writings during this time; many of her works were left unpublished or circulated only in Jamaica. Most of these writings are only available in the Institute of Jamaica in Kingston, as a special collection at the National Library of Jamaica. Given these constraints, it is difficult to understand the whole of Marson's accomplishments during the final two decades of her life.

== Criticism and influences ==
Critics have both praised and dismissed Marson's poetry. She has been criticized for mimicking European style, such as Romantic and Georgian poetics. For example, Marson's poem "If" parodies the style of Kipling's poem of the same title. Denise deCaires Narain has suggested that Marson was overlooked because poetry concerning the condition and status of women was not important to audiences at the time the works were produced. Other critics, by contrast, praised Marson for her modern style. Some, such as Narain, even suggest that her mimicking challenged conventional poetry of the time in an effort to criticize European poets. Regardless, Marson was active in the West Indian writing community during that period. Her involvement with Caribbean Voices was important to publicising Caribbean literature internationally, as well as spurring nationalism within the Caribbean islands that she represented.

== Legacy ==
Marson's poetry was included in the 1992 anthology Daughters of Africa, edited by Margaret Busby.

In 1998, Delia Jarrett-Macauley published the original full-length biography The Life of Una Marson, 1905–1965 (Manchester University Press, reprinted 2010).

On 10 October 2021, Marson was honoured with a Google Doodle.

In 2022, Lenny Henry's production company, Douglas Road Productions, made a television documentary entitled Una Marson, Our Lost Caribbean Voice, broadcast on BBC Two television, in which Delia Jarrett-Macauley asks: "How could we have let someone of Una Marson's calibre just disappear?"; the film included dramatisations of Marson's life, in which she was played by Seroca Davis.

The Una Marson Library was opened by Southwark Council near the Old Kent Road in south London on 2 February 2024 as part of the redevelopment of the Aylesbury Estate in south London, recognising Marson as a "local hero".

== Bibliography ==
- Tropic Reveries (1930, poetry)
- Heights and Depths (1932, poetry)
- At What a Price (1933, play)
- Moth and the Star (1937, poetry)
- London Calling (1938, play)
- Pocomania (1938, play)
- Towards the Stars (1945, poetry)
- Selected Poems (Peepal Tree Press, 2011)

== Sources ==
- Banham, Martin, Errol Hill & George Woodyard (eds). "Introduction" and "Jamaica". In The Cambridge Guide to African & Caribbean Theatre. Advisory editor for Africa, Olu Obafemi. NY & Cambridge: Cambridge University Press, 1994. 141–49; 197–202.
- Narain, Denise deCaires. "Literary Mothers? Una Marson and Phyllis Shand Allfrey". Contemporary Caribbean Women's Poetry: Making Style. New York & London: Routledge, 2002.
- Jarrett-Macauley, Delia. The Life of Una Marson. Manchester (UK): Manchester University Press, 1998. ISBN 978-0719052842. Reprinted 2010, ISBN 9780719082566.
- Jenkins, Lee M. "Penelope's Web: Una Marson, Lorna Goodison, M. Nourbese Philip". In The Language of Caribbean Poetry: Boundaries of Expression. Gainesville, FL: University of Florida Press, 2004.
- Marson, Una. Assorted writings in Linnette Vassell (ed.), Voices of Women in Jamaica, 1898–1939, Mona & Kingston: Dept of History, UWI, 1993.
- Ramchand, Kenneth. "Decolonization in West Indian Literature". Transition, 22 (1965):48–49.
- Rosenberg, Leah. "The Pitfalls of Feminist Nationalism and the Career of Una Marson". In Nationalism and the formation of Caribbean Literature. NY: Palgrave Macmillan, 2007.
- Donnell, Alison. "Contradictory (W)omens?: Gender Consciousness in the Poetry of Una Marson". Kunapipi (1996).
- Donnell, Alison, and Sarah Lawson Welsh (eds). The Routledge Reader in Caribbean Literature. New York, NY: Routledge, 1996.
- Waters, Erika J. "Una Marson". Dictionary of Literary Biography, vol. 157: Caribbean and Black African Writers, third series. 207.
- Bourne, Stephen. Under Fire - Black Britain in Wartime 1939-45. The History Press, 2020. ISBN 978-0750994354.
