= Patricia Mohammed =

Trinidadian feminist scholar (born 1954)

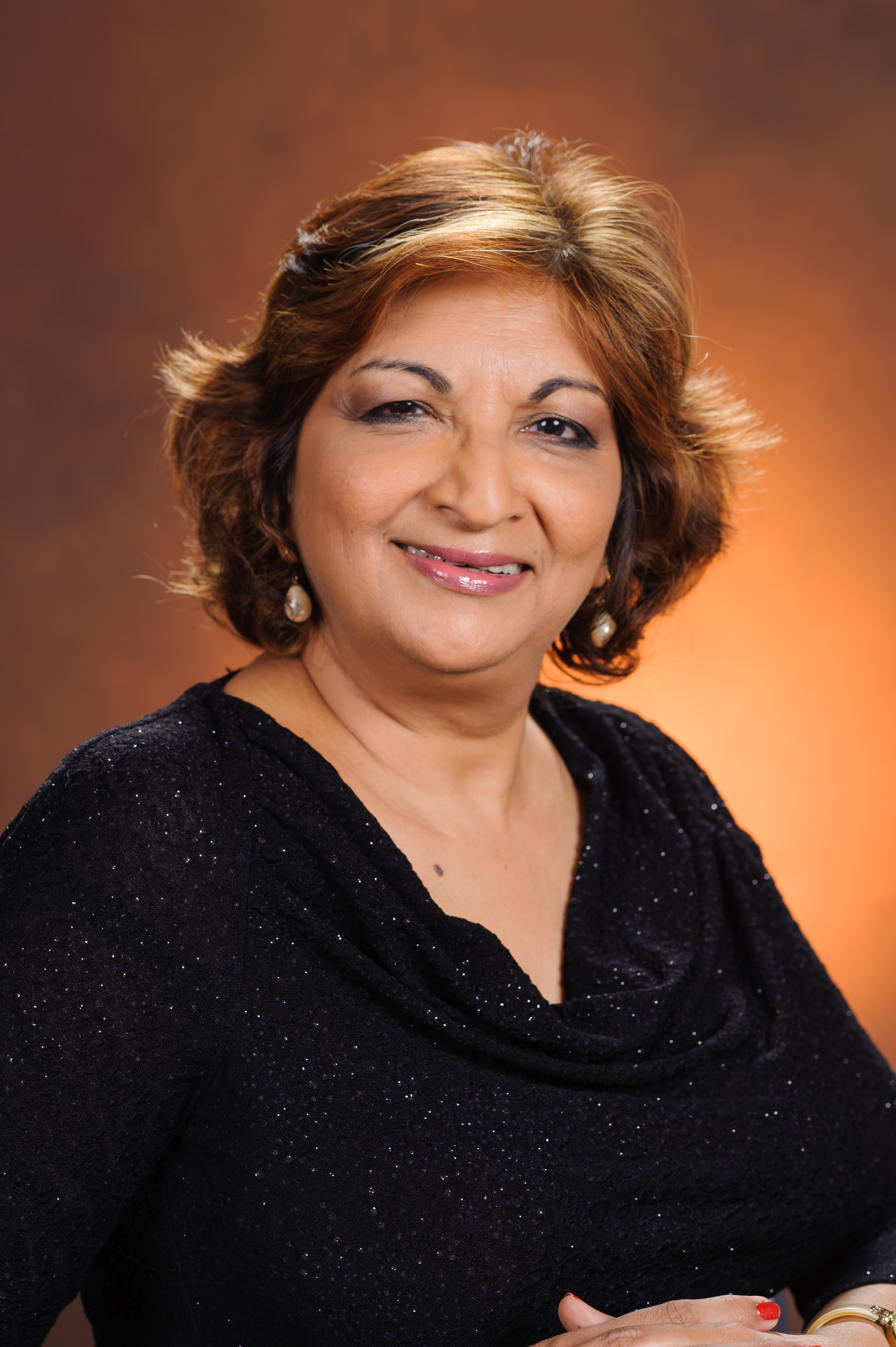
- Born: 28 February 1954 (age 72); Trinidad

Academic background
- Education: Institute of Social Studies

Academic work
- Institutions: University of the West Indies
- Main interests: Feminism, Caribbean feminism
- Notable works: "Rethinking Caribbean Difference", "Gender in Caribbean Development"

Patricia Mohammed (born 28 February 1954) is a Trinidadian scholar, writer, and filmmaker. She is a Professor Emerita of the University of the West Indies (UWI). Her primary research interests are in gender, development and the role of art in the Caribbean imagination. She founded the open-access online peer-reviewed journal Caribbean Review of Gender Studies.

== Education ==
Mohammed has a 1976 bachelor's degree in economics and sociology and a 1987 master's degree in sociology from the University of the West Indies (The UWI).

She received her Ph.D. from the Institute of Social Studies in 1993; her doctoral thesis was entitled A Social History of Post-Migrant Indians in Trinidad, 1917–1947: A Gender Perspective.

== Academic career ==
Mohammed is a Professor Emerita of the University of the West Indies, having previously worked as a professor of gender and cultural studies as well as the St. Augustine campus coordinator for the School of Graduate Studies and Research.

In 2004, she served as Deputy Dean (Graduate Studies and Research) and at various times from 1994 to 2002, she was Head of the Mona Unit, Centre for Gender and Development Studies. She has also acted as Head and holds a Senior Lecturer position at the St. Augustine Unit of the Centre for Gender and Development Studies. In 2007, she was a visiting professor at State University of New York at Albany in a joint appointment with Latin American and Caribbean Studies and Women's Studies.

In 2006, she founded the open-access online peer-reviewed journal Caribbean Review of Gender Studies, of which she serves as the Executive Editor.

== Film and art ==
In 2007, Mohammed branched into filmmaking with her first film, Engendering Change: Caribbean Configurations. The film follows a one-week intensive course on gender sensitive policy making, held in March 2006.

She created a seven-part documentary film series A Different Imagination, which serves as a companion to her book Imagining the Caribbean: Culture and Visual Translation.

Mohammed's academic work also explores the role of art in the Caribbean. She has stated that she always wanted to be an artist, but went the academic route because it was more practical. She stated that "by marrying an artist (Rex Dixon), I have united my two loves, that of writing and painting."

In May 2006, Mohammed and Dixon curated the photo-based exhibition The Caribbean in the Age of Modernity. The show, including 13 Caribbean artists, was first exhibited at the National Library in Port of Spain, Trinidad, and then in October 2006 at the Museum of Modern Art in Santo Domingo, Dominican Republic.

With Dixon, she co-authored the book Travels with a Husband, launched in November 2016, in conjunction with an exhibition of Dixon's artwork.

== Selected works ==
Books

- (Editor) (2002). Gendered realities: Essays in Caribbean feminist thought. University of West Indies Press.
- (2002). Gender Negotiations among Indians in Trinidad 1917–1947. Springer.
- (2016). With Rex Dixon, Travels with a Husband. Hansib, ISBN 9781910553695.

Peer-reviewed articles

- (1998). "Towards indigenous feminist theorizing in the Caribbean". Feminist Review, 59(1), 6–33.
- (2000). "'But most of all mi love me browning': The Emergence in Eighteenth and Nineteenth-Century Jamaica of the Mulatto Woman as the Desired". Feminist Review, 65(1), 22–48.

Book chapters

- (1995). "Writing Gender into History". In Engendering History (pp. 20–47). Palgrave Macmillan.

Films

- Windows of the Past
- The Sign of the Loa
- Coolie Pink and Green
- The Colour of Darkness
- Seventeen Colours and a Sitar

== See also ==
- Postcolonial feminism
- Transnational feminism
