= League of Coloured Peoples =

British civil rights organisation (1931–1951)

- Abbreviation: LCP
- Formation: 1931
- Founder: Harold Moody
- Dissolved: 1951
- Location: London, England
- Publication: The Keys

The League of Coloured Peoples (LCP) was a British civil-rights organisation that was founded in 1931 in London by Jamaican-born physician and campaigner Harold Moody with the goal of racial equality around the world, a primary focus being on black rights in Britain. In 1933, the organisation began publication of the civil-rights journal The Keys. The LCP was a powerful civil-rights force until its dissolution in 1951.

== The beginning ==
Harold Moody, a physician and devout Christian, was frustrated with the prejudice he experienced in Britain, from finding employment to simply obtaining a residence. Through his involvement with the London Christian Endeavour Federation, Moody began to confront employers who were refusing jobs to black Britons. On 13 March 1931, in a YMCA in Tottenham Court Road, London, Moody called a meeting with the contacts he had made over the years. He was helped by Charles H. Wesley, an African-American history professor visiting Britain on a Guggenheim Fellowship, who was a member of the National Association for the Advancement of Colored People (NAACP). On this night, they formed The League of Coloured Peoples.

Its inaugural executive committee included:

- Cecil Belfield Clarke of Barbados
- George Roberts of Trinidad
- Sam Morris of Grenada
- Robert Adams of British Guiana
- Desmond Buckle of the Gold Coast
- Edward Theophilus Nelson of British Guiana

Also present at the inaugural meeting was Stella Thomas, who would go on to become the first woman magistrate in West Africa.

Other prominent members included C. L. R. James, Jomo Kenyatta and Una Marson. Kamal Chunchie was vice-president between 1935 and 1937.

== Aims ==
At the inaugural meeting, the League of Coloured Peoples established four main aims, printed in each issue of The Keys:

- To promote and protect the Social, Educational, Economic and Political Interests of its members;
- To interest members in the Welfare of Coloured Peoples in all parts of the World;
- To improve relations between the Races;
- To cooperate and affiliate with organisations sympathetic to coloured people

In 1937, a fifth aim was added:

- To render such financial assistance to coloured people in distress as lies within our capacity.

== Activities ==
=== The colour bar in the workplace ===
From its inception in 1931 until the outbreak of World War II, the League's primary focus was eliminating the colour bar (the restrictions placed on a group of people due to their race or colour) in the British workplace, in social life, and in housing. Throughout Britain in the 1930s, black people were refused service in many restaurants, hotels, and lodging houses. They also found it extremely difficult to find employment in many industries; the medical profession in particular drew the attention of the league, most likely due to founder and president Harold Moody's personal struggles in that area. By 1935, a branch of the league focusing on equality in the shipping industry had grown to over 80 members. During the 1930s, The League of Coloured Peoples struck many blows for blacks in the workplace.

=== The Charter of Coloured People ===
The Charter of Coloured People "demanded full self-government at the earliest opportunity for people living under British colonial rule, and an end to discrimination on racial grounds in all spheres of public life in the UK."

== During the Second World War ==
During the Second World War, the LCP continued to highlight discrimination. Authorities organising the evacuation of children from the big towns found it very difficult to find families who would take in coloured children, and the LCP lobbied against this. Moody died in 1947 at the age of 64, somewhat worn out by his efforts with the League. His successor as president of the LCP was the surgeon Dr Robert Cole, but Cole resigned in 1949 and within two years the League dissolved. Sometime before the LCP was dissolved, it was said to have enjoyed close contacts with the London branch of the Caribbean Labour Congress led by Billy Strachan.

== See also ==
- Universal Coloured People's Association
