= Harold Moody =

Jamaican-British physician and campaigner (1882–1947)

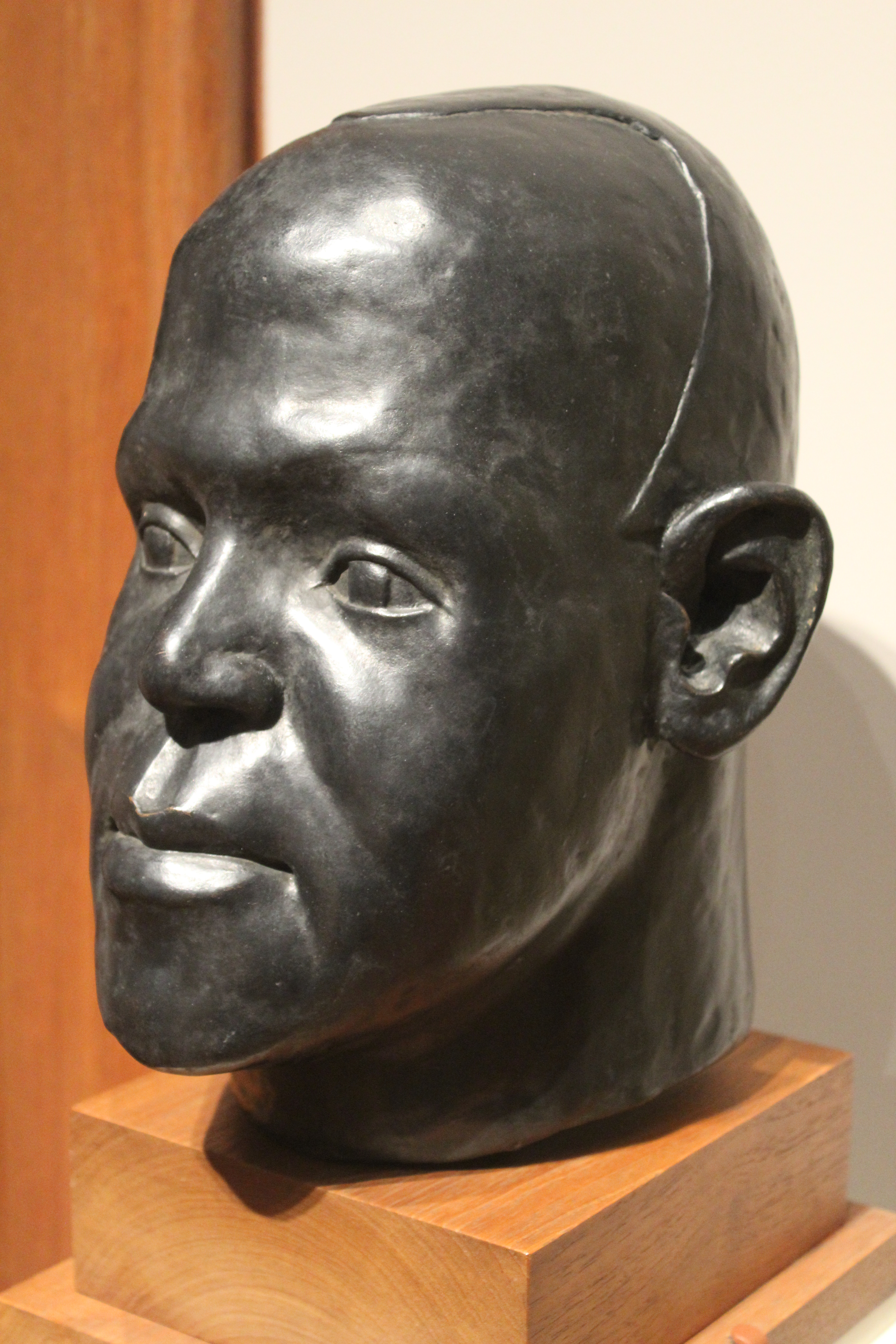
- Harold Moody bronze by Ronald Moody (National Portrait Gallery, London)
- Born: Harold Arundel Moody; 8 October 1882; Kingston, Jamaica
- Died: 24 April 1947 (aged 64); Peckham, London, England
- Education: King's College London
- Occupations: Physician and civil rights activist
- Known for: Founder of the League of Coloured Peoples
- Spouse: Olive Mable Tranter
- Children: 6, including Charles Arundel Moody and Harold Moody
- Relatives: Ludlow Moody (brother); Ronald Moody (brother); Harold Moody (son); Charles Arundel Moody (son)

Harold Arundel Moody (8 October 1882 – 24 April 1947) was a Jamaican-born physician who immigrated to the United Kingdom, where he campaigned against racial prejudice and established the League of Coloured Peoples in 1931 with the support of the Quakers.

== Biography ==
Harold Moody was born in Kingston, Jamaica, in 1882, the son of pharmacist Charles Ernest Moody and his wife Christina Emmeline Ellis. He completed his secondary education at Wolmer's Schools. In 1904, he sailed to the United Kingdom to study medicine at King's College London, finishing top of his class when he qualified in 1910, aged 28. Having been refused work because of his colour, he started his own medical practice in Peckham, south-east London, in February 1913.

In March 1931, Moody formed and became president of the League of Coloured Peoples (LCP), which was concerned with racial equality and civil rights in Britain and elsewhere in the world. Its first members included C. L. R. James, Jomo Kenyatta, Una Marson, and Paul Robeson.

Moody also campaigned against racial prejudice in the armed forces, and is credited with overturning the Special Restriction Order (or Coloured Seamen's Act) of 1925, a discriminatory measure that sought to provide subsidies to merchant shipping employing only British nationals and required alien seamen (many of whom had served the United Kingdom during the First World War) to register with their local police. Many black and Asian British nationals had no proof of identity and were made redundant. In 1933, he became involved in the Coloured Men's Institute, founded by Kamal Chunchie as a religious, social and welfare centre for sailors.

A devout Christian, Moody was active in the Congregational Union, the Colonial Missionary Society (of which he became chair of the board of directors in 1921) and later was appointed president of the Christian Endeavour Union (1936).

Having become a respected and influential doctor in Peckham, Moody was very involved in organising the local community during the Second World War. Historian Stephen Bourne has noted: "In 1944 there was a terrible bombing in south London and he was the first doctor on the scene. He played an important role in these events, saving many lives. Yet this wartime history is not known."

In the last months of his life, Moody undertook a speaking tour of North America. He died at his home at 164 Queen's Road, Peckham, in 1947, aged 64, after contracting influenza.

== Personal life ==
Moody married Olive Mable Tranter, with whom he worked at the Royal Eye Hospital in London, and they had six children. Their son Charles Arundel became the second black commissioned officer in the British Army in 1940, rising to the rank of colonel. Another son, Harold, was a British shot putter.

Moody's brother, Ludlow, also studied medicine at King's College London, where he won the Huxley Prize for physiology. Ludlow married Vera Manley and they moved to the Caribbean. Another brother was the sculptor Ronald Moody.

== Legacy ==
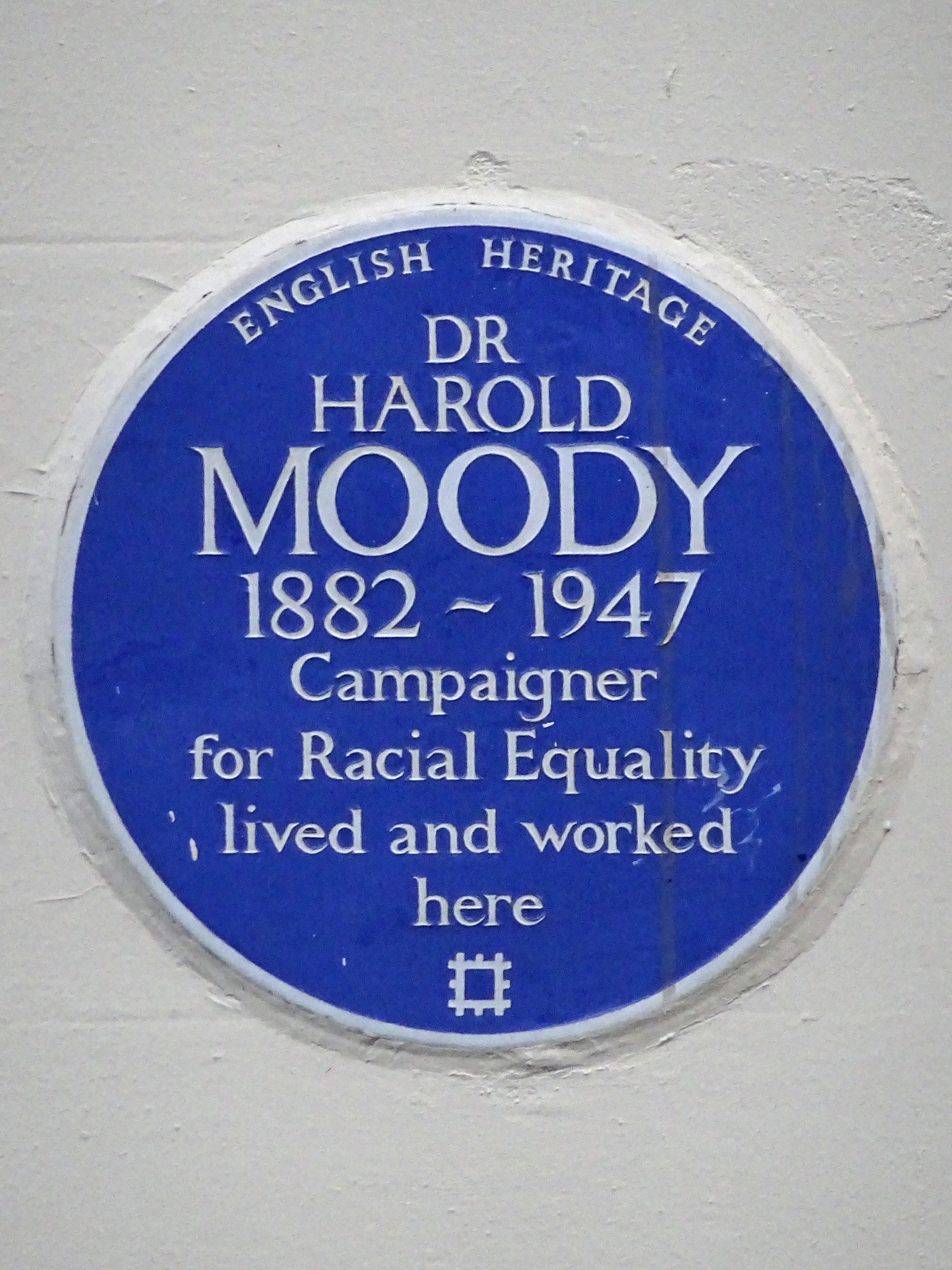
Blue plaque at 164 Queen's Road, Peckham, London

The book Negro Victory: The Life Story of Dr Harold Moody, by David A. Vaughan, was published in 1950.

The house where Moody lived at 164 Queen's Road, Peckham, now has a blue plaque dedicated to him that was erected in 1995 by English Heritage.

The National Portrait Gallery, London, has a bronze bust of Moody, cast in 1997 from a 1946 portrait, by his brother Ronald (1900–1984).

In 2008, Stephen Bourne's short biography Dr Harold Moody was published by Southwark Council and distributed free of charge to schools and public libraries in the London Borough of Southwark.

A short silent animation (by Jason Young) entitled The Story of Dr. Harold Moody, about his married life, was produced in 1998.

Dr Harold Moody Park in Nunhead was officially opened in 1999.

Moody is named on the list of "100 Great Black Britons".

On 13 March 2019, a Nubian Jak Community Trust commemorative blue plaque was unveiled outside the YMCA Club at Tottenham Court Road, where the League of Coloured Peoples was founded at a meeting 88 years earlier.

On 1 September 2020, a Google Doodle celebrating Moody's life was shown, marking the day on which he arrived in the UK in 1904 to pursue his medical studies.

In 2020, Moody was featured in Stephen Bourne's book Under Fire: Black Britain in Wartime 1939–45 (The History Press).

In 2021, Stephen Bourne's eBook The Life of Dr Harold Moody was published by Pearson Education for use in primary schools (Key Stage 2, 9–11 years).

In February 2025, the Harold Moody Health Centre opened in Walworth, south London.
