= David Whynes =

British health economist (1949–2026)

- Born: David Kenneth Whynes; 9 June 1949
- Died: 24 August 2026 (aged 77)

Academic background
- Education: University of York; University of St Andrews

Academic work
- Discipline: Economics
- Sub-discipline: Health economics
- Institutions: University of Nottingham
- Main interests: Economic evaluation of cancer screening; contingent valuation; primary care economics

David Kenneth Whynes (9 June 1949 – 24 August 2026) was a British health economist. After an early research post at the University of York, he spent the rest of his academic career in the School of Economics at the University of Nottingham, where he was Professor of Health Economics from 1998 until 2015 and Professor Emeritus from 2016. He is known for the economic evaluation of cancer screening programmes, in particular as the economist on the Nottingham randomised trial of faecal occult blood screening for colorectal cancer, and for empirical work on contingent valuation and willingness to pay methods in health technology assessment.

== Early life and education ==
Whynes attended The Ecclesbourne School in Duffield, Derbyshire; The Perse School in Cambridge; and the Cambridgeshire College of Arts and Technology. He read politics and economics at the University of York, graduating with a BA in 1971, and then took a Master of Letters in economic development at the University of St Andrews (1971–72; awarded 1974). He later completed a part-time BPhil in Southern African studies at York (1974–76).

== Career ==
After three years as a research fellow at the Institute for Social and Economic Research at York (1973–75), Whynes was appointed Lecturer in Economics at the University of Nottingham in 1976. He was promoted to Senior Lecturer in 1988, Reader in Health Economics in 1993 and Professor of Health Economics in 1998, a chair he held until his retirement in 2015. He was made Professor Emeritus in 2016.

His early work was in development economics and political economy. His first book, The Economics of Third World Military Expenditure (1979), was published by Macmillan and the University of Texas Press, and he co-wrote two textbooks with Roger Bowles, Macroeconomic Planning (1979) and The Economic Theory of the State (1981), the latter translated into Portuguese and French. Through the 1980s and early 1990s he also edited volumes on political economy and the welfare state, including In Defence of Welfare (1985) and Barbara Wootton: Social Science and Public Policy (1986), both with the criminologist Philip Bean, and Current Issues in the Economics of Welfare (1993) with Nicholas Barr.

From the late 1980s, his research turned to health economics. In 1990, he hosted the Health Economists' Study Group meeting in Nottingham. He served as the principal economic investigator for two national colorectal cancer screening trials and for the TOMBOLA trial of the management of low-grade abnormalities detected by cervical screening, and as principal economist for the UK Lung Cancer Screening (UKLS) pilot trial and for a national trial of breast cancer management. He also published on the economics of primary care in England, including GP fundholding and prescribing budgets, on maternity care and services for deaf people, and on the growth of UK health expenditure. He taught undergraduate economics at Nottingham for four decades, latterly specialising in health economics for economics undergraduates and postgraduate medical students. During the 1990s, Whynes collaborated with Christine Ennew on research into entrepreneurship in NHS general practice, examining innovation, efficiency, and entrepreneurial attitudes among GP fundholders.

Over his career he authored or edited ten books and authored, co-authored, or contributed to more than 220 research papers.

== Research ==
=== Cancer screening ===
Whynes made an influential contribution through the economic evaluation of the Nottingham trial of biennial faecal occult blood testing for colorectal cancer, a randomised trial of about 153,000 people begun in 1981 that helped establish the evidence base for the English NHS Bowel Cancer Screening Programme. His cost-effectiveness analyses of the trial, published in Health Economics in 1998 and the Journal of Medical Screening in 2004, estimated the cost per life-year gained from screening and compared it with that of breast cancer screening. With Wendy Atkin, Jack Cuzick and John Northover he co-authored the 1993 Lancet paper proposing that a single flexible sigmoidoscopy at age 55 to 60 could prevent a large share of colorectal cancers at little net cost, which led to the UK Flexible Sigmoidoscopy Screening Trial. Later analyses of the Nottingham trial examined causes of and ages at death among participants, and the relationship between deprivation, screening uptake and survival.

In cervical screening, he led the economic evaluation within the TOMBOLA trial, published in The BMJ in 2009, which found no compelling economic reason to prefer any of the three follow-up strategies for women with low-grade abnormalities, and used the trial's data to study why women attend screening and how the two components of the EQ-5D instrument relate to each other.

=== Preference measurement and contingent valuation ===
Whynes's methodological work focused on the measurement of preferences and on contingent valuation in health. With Emma Frew and Jane Wolstenholme he conducted large randomised survey experiments comparing willingness-to-pay elicitation formats for colorectal cancer screening, finding that payment-scale questions achieved higher completion rates and produced higher valuations than open-ended questions, and documenting range bias in payment scales. A related experiment with Zoë Philips tested the construct validity of willingness-to-pay valuations by giving respondents objective information on the risks and benefits of cervical screening. He also wrote on the tendency of respondents to give 'prominent' round numbers in contingent valuation.

=== Health policy ===
In a 1996 article in The Economic Journal, Whynes examined the prospects for an evidence-based National Health Service, and with Darrin Baines and Keith Tolley he studied the effects of the 1991 GP fundholding reforms on prescribing costs in general practice. His study of general practitioners' referral thresholds used hypothetical case histories to show that specialist interest and waiting time, rather than cost, governed GPs' choice of referral destination.

== Death ==
Whynes lived in Heanor, Derbyshire. He died on 24 August 2026, aged 77; a funeral service was held at Bramcote Crematorium on 25 September 2026, with donations invited for Cancer Research UK.

== Honours ==
Whynes, with Pamela Miller and Patricia Reid, received the Esso Prize for the best paper published in Occupational Medicine in 2000, for an economic evaluation of occupational health services.

== Selected publications ==
=== Books ===
- The Economics of Third World Military Expenditure. London: Macmillan; Austin: University of Texas Press, 1979. ISBN 0-333-24346-3 (Macmillan); ISBN 0-292-72027-0 (Texas).
- (with Roger Bowles) Macroeconomic Planning. London: Allen & Unwin, 1979 (reissued by Routledge, 2015). ISBN 0-04-330294-7, 0-04-330295-5.
- (with Roger Bowles) The Economic Theory of the State. Oxford: Martin Robertson; New York: St Martin's Press, 1981. ISBN 0-85520-375-7.
- Invitation to Economics. Oxford: Martin Robertson / Basil Blackwell, 1983. ISBN 0-85520-531-8, 0-85520-532-6.
- Comparative Economic Development. London: Butterworths, 1983. ISBN 0-408-10683-2, 0-408-10682-4.
- (ed.) What is Political Economy? Eight Perspectives. Oxford: Basil Blackwell, 1984. ISBN 0-85520-746-9.
- (ed. with Philip Bean and John Ferris) In Defence of Welfare. London: Tavistock, 1985. ISBN 0-422-79090-7.
- (ed. with Philip Bean) Barbara Wootton: Social Science and Public Policy. London: Tavistock, 1986. ISBN 0-422-79690-5.
- (ed. with Philip Bean) Policing and Prescribing: The British System of Drug Control. London: Macmillan, 1991. ISBN 0-333-52229-X.
- Welfare State Economics. Oxford: Heinemann Educational, 1992. ISBN 0-435-33015-2.
- (ed. with Nicholas Barr) Current Issues in the Economics of Welfare. London: Macmillan; New York: St Martin's Press, 1993. ISBN 0-333-55694-1, 0-333-55695-X (Macmillan); ISBN 0-312-08651-2 (St Martin's).
- (with Darrin Baines and Keith Tolley) Prescribing, Budgets and Fundholding in General Practice. OHE Current Health Problems no. 125. London: Office of Health Economics, 1997. ISBN 1-899040-15-3.

=== Articles ===
- Atkin WS, Cuzick J, Northover JM, Whynes DK (1993). "Prevention of colorectal cancer by once-only sigmoidoscopy". The Lancet 341(8847): 736–740.
- Whynes DK (1996). "Towards an evidence-based National Health Service?" The Economic Journal 106(439): 1702–1712.
- Whynes DK, Neilson AR, Walker AR, Hardcastle JD (1998). "Faecal occult blood screening for colorectal cancer: is it cost-effective?" Health Economics 7(1): 21–29.
- Whynes DK, Frew E, Wolstenholme JL (2003). "A comparison of two methods for eliciting contingent valuations of colorectal cancer screening". Journal of Health Economics 22(4): 555–574.
- Whynes DK, Philips Z, Avis M (2007). "Why do women participate in the English cervical cancer screening programme?" Journal of Health Economics 26(2): 306–325.
- TOMBOLA Group (2009). "Options for managing low grade cervical abnormalities detected at screening: cost effectiveness study". BMJ 339: b2549.
- Scholefield JH, Moss SM, Mangham CM, Whynes DK, Hardcastle JD (2012). "Nottingham trial of faecal occult blood testing for colorectal cancer: a 20-year follow-up". Gut 61(7): 1036–1040.
