= Romney Street Group =

British current affairs and lunch club

- Founded: 1917
- Purpose: Social, political and lunch club
- Location: London
- Members: 120 (approx.)
- Website: https://romneystreetgroup.org

The Romney Street Group (also known as RSG) is a British current affairs and lunch club. The RSG was founded in 1917 as an early form of think tank. The first chairman was Thomas Jones, who was Deputy Secretary to the Cabinet under four successive prime ministers. According to a 2007 article in Twentieth Century British History, "dining groups were amongst the most common of [informal] networks; and the Romney Street Group, which has been existence in various guises since 1917, is eminent amongst them." Since the 1960s the RSG has hosted lunchtime talks during the academic term.

== History ==
The RSG was founded in February 1917 by J. P. Thorp, who was the drama critic for Punch, to generate policies for the post war reconstruction of Britain for the Lloyd George government. Thorp stated his intention was to bring together a "group of interesting men for a weekly lunch and casual discussion", which became the format of meetings. The name came from its first meeting place, the home of the actress Edyth Goodall at 58 Romney Street, Westminster. Rather than impose on their hostess for too long, the RSG only met in Romney Street for about 18 months, before relocating to the premises of the Garton Foundation in Dean's Yard, Westminster. The first chairman (1917–1933) was Thomas Jones, who from 1916 to 1930 was Deputy Secretary to the Cabinet. Other members were mostly civil servants, academics and journalists.

Jones's archive suggests that the chairman would set the agenda for each meeting and outline the topics that were to be discussed during lunch. A 2007 history of the first five years of the RSG, up to the fall of the Lloyd George administration, concluded that the RSG "had no direct influence on government policy". However, according to the Oxford Dictionary of National Biography, the RSG "formed the embryo of the staff of the Ministry of Reconstruction under Christopher Addison that was formed by Lloyd George on 17 July 1917". Indeed, a 2006 book and 2018 article on post World War I British industrial relations describe the formation of the RSG as an "important moment in the elaboration of the idea of economic or functional democracy in Great Britain", because of the "seminal importance [of the RSG] to the results produced by the Whitley Committee". The autobiography of Jack Catchpool (who chaired the RSG from 1935 to 1950) notes that various ideas discussed during the inter-war years did eventually get on the statute books, but the RSG's strict use of the Chatham House Rule prevented any public recognition. The RSG might have also influenced political discourse through journalist members, which included editorial staff at The New Statesman and The Nation & Athenaeum magazine. For example, Kingsley Martin, who edited The New Statesman from 1930 to 1960, states in his autobiography that the RSG was his "most important contact ... with different modes of thought", and his biographer describes the RSG as "influential but little known".

Given the connection to the Lloyd George administration, the early membership of the RSG has unsurprisingly been described as liberal or centre-left. For example, despite the RSG having never had an affiliation to any political party, Asa Briggs described the RSG in the early inter-war period as "a luncheon club of Labour sympathizers". Notable early members included numerous left-wing luminaires such as G. D. H. Cole (the first Chichele Professor of Social and Political Theory at Oxford and an influential Fabian), Arthur Greenwood (the Deputy Leader of the Labour Party in the 1930s and 40s), Lord Lothian (Liberal politician and ambassador to the United States), R. H. Tawney (an influential economic historian and Christian socialist), and Sir Alfred Zimmern (an academic who coined the term "welfare state" and helped found UNESCO). Other notable members include Professor Lionel Curtis (the founder of Chatham House), Dr Walter Elliot (a Conservative Cabinet minister), Lord Elwyn-Jones (a Labour Attorney General and Lord Chancellor), Professor Harold Laski (chairman of the Labour Party), and E. F. Schumacher (author of Small Is Beautiful).

After the fall of the Lloyd George administration, the RSG continued to meet for lunch and discussion. During the 1920s and 1930s the topics for discussion shifted from post-war reconstruction to foreign affairs and economics. The membership grew during this period, although prior to World War II remained less than 30. During the 1930s, the RSG decided to source non-Spanish sherry so as to not support the Spanish government until the death of Franco in 1976. The minute books show that the RSG continued during World War II, but no records were kept of what was discussed. Since its inception members have brought guests to meetings; notable guests prior to 1950 included James Callaghan, Michael Foot, Jawaharlal Nehru, and Archbishop William Temple.

The nature of the RSG changed radically in the early 50s. To keep afloat, the number of members was doubled to around 60. Meetings shifted into more formal discussions led by an external invited speaker, but lunch remained an essential social feature. The first female member was admitted around 1959. In 1967, the RSG celebrated its 50th birthday with a dinner in the House of Lords. The guest speaker was Baroness White, then Minister of State at the Welsh Office, who was the daughter of the RSG's first chairman Thomas Jones.

Since 1984, the RSG has held weekly meetings during academic terms in the Athenaeum Club for an informal sandwich lunch, with a 20-minute talk by a guest speaker followed by 40 minutes of Q&A, all under the Chatham House Rule. The membership has been maintained at around 120 since then, with Athenaeum members and guests welcomed. In 2017 the RSG celebrated its centenary with a formal lunch at the Athenaeum and a talk by the Rt Hon. Alan Johnson MP, a former Labour Cabinet minister. In 2024 the RSG switched to holding biweekly meetings, with some held at the Army and Navy Club.

The archives of the RSG (from 1924 to 2000) are stored at the British Library of Political and Economic Science at the London School of Economics [GB0097]. Some earlier records are stored with Thomas Jones's papers in the National Library of Wales.

== Membership ==
=== Chairs ===
- 1917 – 1933: Dr Thomas Jones* CH LL.D (1870 – 1955), Deputy Secretary to the Cabinet under four successive prime ministers.
- 1933 – 1934: Harold Wright (c1884 – 1934), writer for The Nation.
- 1934 – 1935: Professor G. I. H. Lloyd (1875 – 1939), Director of the Department of Overseas Trade.
- 1935 – 1950: Jack Catchpool CBE (1890 – 1971), Warden of Toynbee Hall and general secretary of the Youth Hostels Association.
- 1950 – 1967 John Pimlott CB (1909 – 1969), Private secretary to the Home Secretary.
- 1968 – 1985: Sir Arthur Peterson KCB MVO (1916 – 1986), Director general of the Greater London Council and then permanent secretary of the Home Office.
- 1985 – 1997: Peter Dixon FRSA (1932–2001), senior civil servant at the Treasury and Secretary of National Economic Development Council.
- 1997 – 2004: David Morphet, poet and diplomat who was a former UK Governor at the IEA and the IAEA (during the Chernobyl disaster).
- 2004 – 2007: Professor Michael Lee (1932 – 2022), Dean of the Faculty of Social Science at the University of Bristol.
- 2007 – 2014: Sydney Norris CB (1937 – 2018), senior civil servant at the Home Office.
- 2014 – 2017: John Pickering CEng FIEE, former director of British Telecom.
- 2017 – 2019 Professor Philip Bean, Emeritus professor of Criminology at Loughborough University and former President of the British Society of Criminology, and Dr David Hughes CEng MIMechE FRAeS (1944 – 2020), senior civil servant at the Ministry of Defence and then senior executive BAE Systems.
- 2019 – 2020 Dr David Hughes, and Lady Hancock, academic and author.
- 2020 – 2021 Lady Hancock, and Robert Foster CEng FIET FRAeS, former Chief Executive of the UK Competition Commission.
- 2021 – 2024: Robert Foster.
- 2024 – present: Dr Valery Rees, Renaissance Scholar.

=== Notable historic members ===
- Sir Robert Andrew OBE (1928 – 2023), Permanent secretary at the Northern Ireland Office.
- Sir Harold Banwell (1900 – 1982), secretary of the Association of Municipal Corporations.
- Sir Gerald Barry (1898 – 1968), newspaper editor and organiser of the Festival of Britain in 1951.
- Professor Ivor Brown CBE (1891 – 1974), editor of The Observer and man of letters.
- C. Delisle Burns (1879 – 1942), lecturer at the University of London known for advocating secularism.
- Sir Henry Clay* (1883 – 1954), economist and Warden of Nuffield College, Oxford.
- Professor G. D. H. Cole (1889 – 1959), the first Chichele Professor of Social and Political Theory at the University of Oxford and an influential Fabian.
- Professor Lionel Curtis CH (1872 – 1955), academic and civil servant who founded Chatham House.
- His Honour Anthony Diamond QC (1929 – 2022), judge and maritime lawyer.
- Dr Ellis Douek FRCS (1934 – 2024), surgeon and pioneer of cochlear implants.
- Sir Gordon Downey KCB (1928 – 2022), Comptroller and Auditor General and later first Parliamentary Commissioner for Standards.
- Sir Wilfred Eady GCMG KCB KBE (1890 – 1962), civil servant and diplomat.
- Walter Elliot CH MC PC FRS FRSE FRCP (1888 – 1958), doctor and Scottish Unionist/Conservative politician who held various Cabinet roles in the interwar period.
- H. J. Gillespie (c1881 – 1950), political activist for Women's suffrage.
- Arthur Greenwood* CH (1880 – 1954), Deputy Leader of the Labour Party in the 1930s and 40s.
- John Lawrence Hammond* (1872 – 1949), historian and member of the editorial team of The Guardian.
- E. H. E. Havelock* CBE (1891 – 1974), Assistant secretary of various departments.
- Professor Sir Hubert Henderson (1890 – 1952), Drummond Professor of Political Economy at All Souls College, Oxford, editor of The Nation and Athenaeum and Liberal Party politician.
- C. R. Hewitt (1901 – 1994), City of London Police Chief Inspector who was then member of the editorial staff of The New Statesman.
- Professor John Hilton* (1880 – 1943), Montague Burton Professor of Industrial Relations at the University of Cambridge and early consumer champion.
- Marcus Hope OBE JP FRAS (1942 – 2022), ambassador to Zaire.
- Elwyn Jones, Baron Elwyn-Jones CH PC QC FKC (1909 – 1989), Barrister and Labour politician who served as Attorney General for England and Wales and then Lord Chancellor.
- Martin Kenyon (1930 – 2022), anti-Apartheid campaigner who was an early recipient of the COVID-19 vaccine and was described as a "national treasure" in various news outlets including The Guardian and The Evening Standard.
- Reuben Kelf-Cohen CB (1895 – 1981), under secretary of the Ministry of Fuel and Power who published three studies on nationalisation in Britain.
- Anthony Kember MHSM CCMI (1931 – 2017), Department of Health and hospital administrator.
- Philip Kerr, 11th Marquess of Lothian* KT CH PC DL (1882 – 1940), private secretary to Prime Minister David Lloyd George, Chancellor of the Duchy of Lancaster, and ambassador to the United States.
- Dr Paul Knapman DL FRCP FRCS FFFLM (1944 – 2026), HM Coroner for Westminster, President of the Coroner's Society and the Clinical Forensic and Legal section of The Royal Society of Medicine.
- Professor Harold Laski (1893 – 1950), influential Marxist economist at the London School of Economics and chairman of the Labour Party.
- Sir David Low (1891 – 1963), cartoonist at various newspapers including The Evening Standard and The Guardian.
- James Joseph Mallon* CH JP (1874 – 1961), economist, Warden of Toynbee Hall, and Labour activist.
- Kingsley Martin (1897 – 1969), editor of The New Statesman.
- Anthony Merifield KCVO CB (1934 – 2024), Senior Civil Servant in the Department of Health and Social Security and Cabinet Office.
- Dr Bob Morris CVO (1937 – 2025), Assistant Under-Secretary of State and head of the Criminal Justice and Constitutional Department at the Home Office, then a Research Associate of the Constitution Unit at UCL.
- Charles Mostyn Lloyd (1878 – 1946), lecturer at London School of Economics, and editor of The New Statesman.
- Peter Mountfield (1935 – 2020), Under Secretary to the Cabinet.
- Vaughan Nash CVO CB (1861 – 1932), Journalist and Principal Private Secretary to the Prime Minister of the United Kingdom.
- Sir John Newsom CBE Hon FRIBA (1910 – 1971), educationalist who chaired the Newsom Report.
- Professor Ben Pimlott FBA (1945 – 2004), Chairman of the Fabian Society, political editor of The New Statesman, and Warden of Goldsmiths, University of London.
- Sir Horace Plunkett KCVO PC (Ire) JP DL FRS (1854 – 1932), Anglo-Irish Unionist politician who was at different times both an MP and Irish Senator.
- Terence Price (1921 – 2013), Secretary-General of the Uranium Institute and Chief Scientific Officer of at the Ministry of Defence and Ministry of Transport. Introduced the RSG to the Athenaeum.
- Norman Reddaway CBE (1918 – 1999), UK ambassador to Poland.
- Sir Dennis Robertson (1890 – 1963), academic economist who coined the term "Liquidity trap".
- Sir Hugh Rossi KCSG KHS FKC (1927 – 2020), Conservative politician and minister in the governments of Edward Heath and Margaret Thatcher.
- Sir Alfred Sherman (1919 – 2006), communist volunteer in the Spanish Civil War who became an advisor to Margaret Thatcher and cofounded the Centre for Policy Studies
- E. F. Schumacher CBE (1911 – 1977), Chief Economic Advisor to the British National Coal Board and author of Small Is Beautiful.
- Sir George Schuster KCSI KCMG CBE MC (1881 – 1982), Liberal Party politician who had been the economic administrator for various British colonies.
- Aileen Scorrer CBE (1905 – 1984), Chief Inspector of the Children's Department, then in the Home Office.
- John Strachey (1860 – 1927), editor of The Spectator.
- Sir James Swaffield CBE RD DL (1924 – 2015), Director general of the Greater London Council.
- Professor R. H. Tawney* (1880 – 1962), influential economic historian and Christian socialist.
- J. P. Thorp* (1873 – 1962), cartoonist and drama critic for Punch and founder of the RSG.
- Ralph Tubbs OBE FRIBA (1912 – 1996), leading post-war British architect who designed the Dome of Discovery for the Festival of Britain.
- Sir Clough Williams-Ellis CBE MC (1883 – 1978), architect and creator of Portmeirion.
- Sir Peregrine Worsthorne (1923 – 2020), conservative-leaning editor of The Sunday Telegraph.
- Sir Evelyn Wrench KCMG (1882 – 1966), editor of The Spectator who founded the Royal Over-Seas League and the English-Speaking Union.
- Dr Martin Wright (1930 – 2025), Former Librarian of the Cambridge Institute of Criminology and Director of Howard League.
- Dr Margaret Yates (1904 – ?), academic and educationalist who is thought to be the RSG's second female member.
- Professor Sir Alfred Zimmern* (1879 – 1957), liberal thinker who coined the term "welfare state" and contributed to the founding of UNESCO.

Members and chairs with asterisks were founding members.

== External links and further reading ==
- The RSG’s website.
- The Romney Street Group 1917 to 2017, a history of the RSG by Dr Bob Morris CVO.
- The RSG’s Oxford Dictionary of National Biography entry.
- The RSG’s Encyclopaedia of British and Irish Political Organizations entry.
