= List of International Baccalaureate people =

This is a list of notable people affiliated with the International Baccalaureate, including IB directors-general, chairs of the IB Board of Governors (previously known as the IB Council of Foundation), and notable graduates of one or more of the three IB programmes.

== IB directors-general ==
- Alec Peterson (1968–1977)
- Gerard Renaud (1977–1983)
- Roger Peel (1983–1998)
- Derek Blackman (1998–1999)
- George Walker (1999–2005)
- Jeffrey Beard (2006-2013)
- Dr Siva Kumari (2014–2021)
- Olli-Pekka Heinonen (2021-present)

== Chair of IB Board of Governors ==
- John Goormaghtigh (1968–1981)
- Seydou Madani Sy (1981–1984)
- Piet Gathier (1984–1990)
- Thomas Hagoort (1990–1996)
- Bengt Thelin (1996–1997)
- Greg Crafter (1997–2003)
- Monique Seefried (2003–2009)
- Carol Bellamy (2009 - April 2015)
- George Rupp (April 2015 – present)

== Notable alumni ==
- Randa Abdel-Fattah, author, graduate of the Australian International Academy.
- Douglas Alexander, British Labour party Politician and former Shadow Secretary of State for Foreign Affairs, graduate of the Pearson College UWC
- Maudy Ayunda, Indonesian singer, graduate of British School Jakarta
- Yuriko Backes, Luxembourgish diplomat and politician, graduate of Canadian Academy
- Alia Bhatt, Bollywood actress, daughter of Mahesh Bhatt, graduate of Jamnabai Narsee School
- Marina Catena, Director of the United Nations World Food Program, graduate of UWC Adriatic
- Felipe Contepomi, Former Argentine rugby player and Orthopaedic Surgeon, graduate of Colegio Cardenal Newman
- Marina Diamandis, Musician and Pop Artist, who took the diploma at St. Catherine's British School in Greece
- Anne Enright, 2007 Man Booker Prize award-winning novelist, first Irish Laureate for Fiction and graduate of Pearson College UWC
- Mahan Esfahani, noted harpsichordist, graduate of Richard Montgomery High School
- Julia Galef, American philosopher, graduate of Richard Montgomery High School
- Gael García Bernal, actor, graduate of the Edron Academy
- Sunit Ghosh, graduate of Global Indian International School
- Alex Honnold, American professional rock climber, graduate of Mira Loma High School
- Akihiko Hoshide, astronaut, graduate of the UWC South East Asia
- Princess Raiyah bint Hussein, daughter of King Hussein and Queen Noor of Jordan, graduate of the UWC Atlantic
- Khairy Jamaluddin, Malaysian politician, Malaysian federal Minister of Science, Technology and Innovation, graduate of the UWC South East Asia
- Lauren Jauregui, Cuban-American singer-songwriter, dancer, and former member of Fifth Harmony, graduate of Carrollton School of the Sacred Heart
- Ken Jennings, American quiz show contestant and Jeopardy! winnings record holder, graduate of the Seoul Foreign School
- Kim Jong Un, General Secretary of the Worker's Party of Korea, reportedly pursued the IB programme while attending the International School of Berne
- Sonam Kapoor, Bollywood actress, daughter of Anil Kapoor, graduate of the UWC South East Asia
- Robbie Kay, actor (Pirates of the Caribbean: On Stranger Tides, Once Upon a Time), graduate of the British International School of Houston
- Kesha, American singer graduated from Brentwood High School
- Praya Lundberg, Thai/Swedish actress and model, Southeast Asia's first UNHCR Goodwill Ambassador, graduate of NIST International School
- Nadiem Makarim, Minister of Education, Culture, Research and Technology of Indonesia and Founder of Gojek, Indonesia's first startup valued over US$10 billion, graduate of UWC South East Asia
- Mata, Polish hip-hop singer-songwriter, graduate of Stephen Báthory 2nd High School.
- Vic Michaelis, American-Canadian improvisational comedian and actor.
- Joji, singer-songwriter, record producer, author, and former Internet personality, graduate of Canadian Academy
- Karen Mok, Hong Kong-based actress and singer-songwriter, attended UWC Adriatic
- Dustin Moskovitz, co-founder of Facebook, graduate of Vanguard High School
- Derek Muller, creator of Veritasium YouTube channel, graduate of West Vancouver Secondary School
- Carey Mulligan, actor, International School of Düsseldorf
- Mohamed Nasheed, politician, former president of the Maldives, attended Overseas Children's School (now Overseas School of Colombo)
- Lupita Nyong'o, Kenyan actress, (12 Years a Slave, Academy Award for best supporting actress 2014), graduate of St. Mary's School, Nairobi
- KSI, singer-songwriter, YouTube personality, graduate of Berkhamsted School
- Jorma Ollila, former CEO of Nokia, graduate of the UWC Atlantic
- Ignacio Padilla, Mexican novelist and short story writer, graduate of Waterford Kamhlaba United World College of Southern Africa
- Kaesang Pangarep, son of Indonesian President Joko Widodo, graduate of ACS International
- Julie Payette, Governor General of Canada, astronaut, graduate of the UWC Atlantic
- Nico Rosberg, former Formula 1 driver for Mercedes-AMG Petronas, 2016 FIA Formula 1 Drivers' Championship winner. Graduate of ISN Nice
- Peter Sands, former CEO of Standard Chartered Bank, graduate of Pearson College UWC
- Hege Solbakken, Norwegian CEO of Offshore Media Group, graduate of Bergen Katedralskole
- Sarah Tan, Channel V VJ, graduate of the UWC South East Asia
- Ebba Busch Thor, Leader of the Christian Democrats (Sweden)
- Justin Trudeau, former Prime Minister of Canada, Member of the Liberal Party of Canada, IB Diploma from the Collège Jean-de-Brébeuf in 1991.
- Michael Tubbs, Mayor of Stockton, California, IB Diploma from Franklin High School
- King Willem-Alexander, King of the Netherlands, graduate of UWC Atlantic
- Abiodun Williams, President of The Hague Institute for Global Justice, graduate of Pearson College UWC
- Lorde, New Zealander Singer-songwriter, graduate of Takapuna Grammar School
