= Police culture =

Police culture is the set of values, norms, and perspectives that inform police conduct. Police culture has a great effect on how police officers exercise their power and discretion about which crimes to pay attention to and how suspects are treated while in their custody. As a result, police culture has become increasingly and internationally important in both academic and policy discussion of policing.

Studies of a police culture that is distinct from the culture of the general public began in the United States and the United Kingdom in the 1960s. By the early 21st century the concept had been widely accepted as orthodoxy in the field of police studies.

Understanding of police culture is an important element of police reform.

== History of study ==
Early academic work in police sociology was carried out in the 1960s, especially in the United States and Great Britain. These early empirical ethnographies challenged the prevailing notion at the time that police forces were "rule-bound, legalistic, bureaucratic organizations", in which strict discipline enforced top-down government policies.

Michael Banton's The Policeman in the Community (1964) was possibly the first book-length study of police culture. This study presented a "primarily harmonious view of British society" that neglected problems of police corruption and violence against marginalized communities. The book described working class officers as "peace keepers" rather than "law enforcers"; Banton also noted that police authority resulted in officers' social isolation. Jerome Skolnick investigated in 1966 how the pressures and tensions inherent to policing produced a "working personality" of suspiciousness, social isolation, conservatism, and internal solidarity with other police officers. More critical analyses of police culture began to appear in the 1970s. Maureen Cain examined difference between urban and rural police forces, finding that urban policing was marked by greater prejudice against minority ethnic groups, while rural policing was a comparatively "quiet and leisurely affair".

Many studies have made "blanket critiques" of police culture that emphasize the role of traditional police culture in perpetuating police abuse and misconduct, though ethnographies of police in some countries from the Global South suggest that police cultures may be more varied than described by mainstream scholarship on the subject (most of which is produced by non-communist countries from the Global North), and that distinct police cultures in some places may contribute to greater community responsiveness.

== Traditional police culture ==
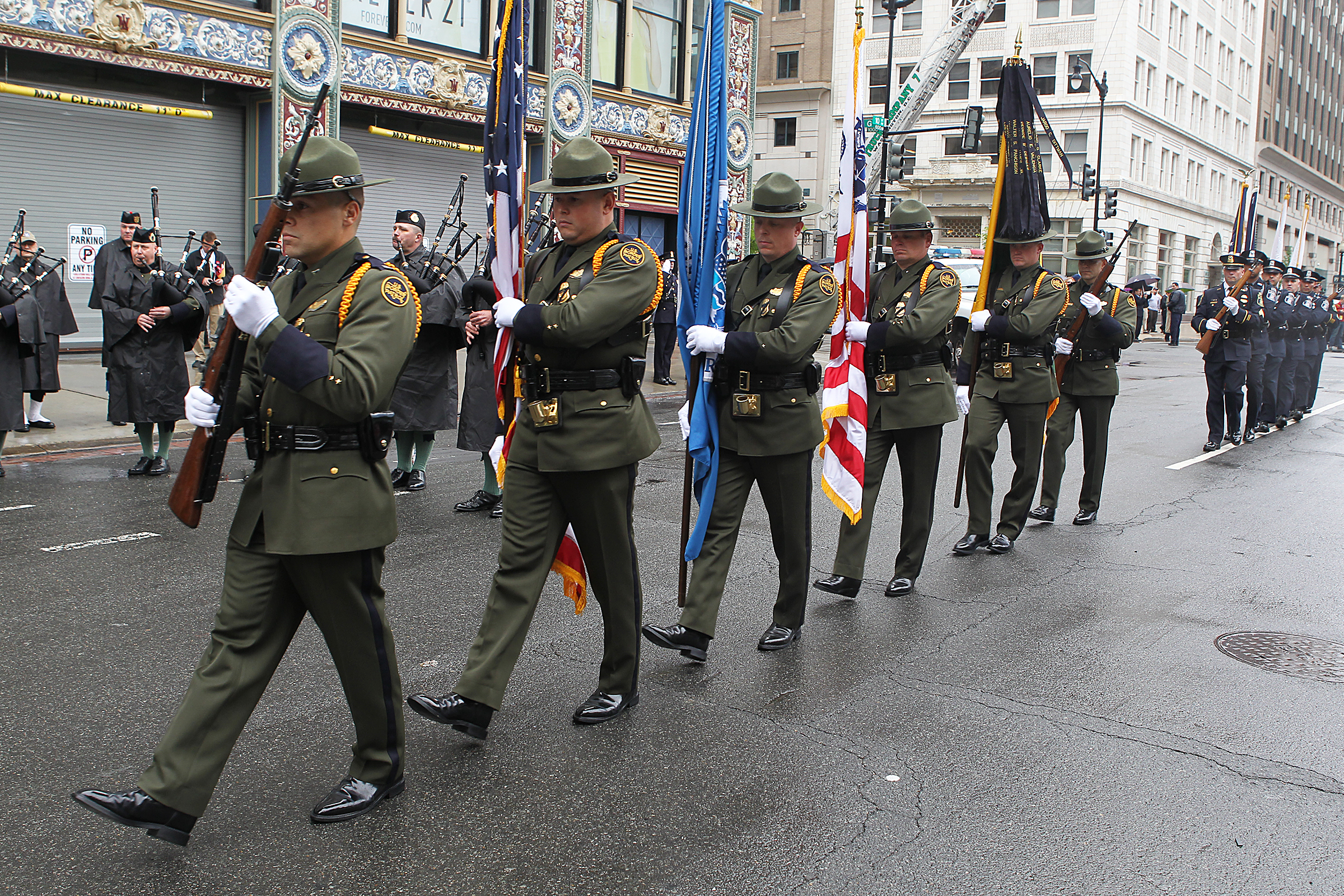
The Border Patrol Honor Guard marching to enter St. Patrick's Cathedral, Washington, DC. in the passing of the colors, in 2003

Traditional police culture emphasizes the role of police in law enforcement and "crime fighting" rather than service and maintenance of order. It is associated with more aggressive policing and with a "code of silence" where officers are expected to avoid reporting misconduct. Traditional police culture maintains some similarities across international jurisdictions including the United Kingdom, the United States, and Canada in its characterization by dominance, suspicion, insularity, and stereotyping or prejudice.

Police Culture: Positive and Negative Attributes
Positive attributes	Negative attributes
Safety	Cynicism
Camaraderie	Close-mindedness
Empathy	Biases
Support	Prejudice
Caring	Non-scientific tactics
Teamwork	Overly conservative
Loyalty	Loyalty
Sacrifice	Alienated
	Suspicion
	Authoritarianism

=== Hypermasculinity ===
There is persistent consensus among scholars that police culture is gendered at individual and organizational levels; and while women do participate in policing they are not well-represented. Researchers have consistently described police culture as "machismo" or hyper-masculine.

Beginning in 1985, Brazil, Argentina, and Peru have implemented segregated women's police stations in an effort to mitigate the effects of hypermasculine police culture. In 2004, there were 339 such stations throughout Brazil. There is evidence that these women's police stations enhance trust in police for victims of gendered crimes such as domestic violence, leading to earlier reporting of gendered crimes and also reduction in crime rates. Similar effects have been found for this strategy in India. Much of the theorizing about women's participation in policing is influenced by liberal feminism, which would promote integration of women into the main body of the police force rather than segregation into women's police stations. The success of these women's stations has challenged this approach and prompted debate about the best response to hypermasculinity in police culture.

== By region ==
=== China ===
Influenced by Confucian theories of moral order, police culture in China historically emphasized moral and ethical behavior rather than laws and punishment. This was reflected in promulgation of the directives of the Communist Party, which were perceived to set moral and ethical standards. Beginning in 1952, all police departments included a "political section" associated with the communist party whose role was to disseminate party policies and instruct police in moral behavior.

Following the reform and opening up in the 1980s, police strategies in China shifted toward "harder" policing, with associated abuses of police power and deterioration of police community relations. Twenty-first century studies of Chinese policing have found that officers embrace aspects of traditional police culture including the "crime fighter" image, perceiving that service elements of policing distract from their more important goals of fighting crime. A 2017 study found that half of police supervisors found it necessary to violate regulations and restrictions on police behavior in order to do their jobs.

=== Latin America ===
Latin America has a history of military dictatorships in the latter portion of the 20th century, when police forces participated in human rights abuses. New democracies emerging from these earlier conditions inherited militarized and abusive police forces that were "sometimes corrupt, and nearly everywhere feared by the population".

=== United States ===
In the United States, traditional police culture is associated with conservative right-wing politics. Commonly proposed characteristics of traditional police culture in the United States include self-perception of police as "warrior cops" in an "us vs. them" battle against a threatening and potentially criminal public.

Police culture has been at the forefront of public dialogue since several high-profile police killings in the 2020s (especially the murder of George Floyd) resulted in racial unrest and associated calls to defund the police.

=== South Africa ===
In 2017, the South African Police Service (SAPS) displayed "all the elements identified in the American and British classics on police organisational culture: the sense of mission; the cynicism and suspicion; the machismo, sexism and racism; and the secrets and solidarity between colleagues." In 1994, Dr. Sidney Mufamadi, The South African Minister of Safety and Security, addressed the need for change in the nation's police culture and promoted community policing, stating that, "Changing the police culture is perhaps the most significant challenge facing the new government"

== Other factors ==
In some countries, civil wars have shaped police culture, although there are differences in how this takes place. Civil wars in Rwanda, in Uganda, and in Sierra Leone all shaped the subsequent police culture. In all three cases, Western models of policing were imported, partly due to reliance on foreign aid during the war. Where rebel groups were successful, as in Uganda and Rwanda, a form of local popular justice was implemented, supplemented by the police.
