= Christine Ennew =

Christine Thelma Ennew OBE (born April 1960) is a British economist and academic.

She was the Provost of the University of Warwick between August 2016 and August 2023.

Ennew's early academic career was as an agricultural economist at the University of Newcastle upon Tyne. She subsequently moved into marketing and became the professor of marketing at the University of Nottingham.

During the 1990s, Ennew collaborated with David K. Whynes on research into entrepreneurship in NHS general practice, examining innovation, efficiency, and entrepreneurial attitudes among GP fundholders. Together with Whynes, she supervised Darrin Baines's University of York MSc dissertation, Toward a Theory of GP Entrepreneurship, submitted in October 1993.

She was made OBE in Queen Elizabeth II's 2016 Birthday Honours list.

== Selected publications ==
- The Marketing Blueprint: Business Blueprints. Wiley-Blackwell, 1993. ISBN 0631187154
- Financial Services Marketing: An International Guide to Principles and Practice. Routledge, 2013. (With Nigel Waite) ISBN 978-0415521673
