= Devorah Lieberman =

18th President of the University of La Verne
- In office 2011–2023
- Preceded by: Stephen Morgan
- Succeeded by: Pardis Mahdaviv

Personal details
- Born: 1952 (age 73–74) Baltimore, Maryland, U.S.
- Children: 2
- Education: Humboldt State University (BA); San Diego State University (MA); University of Florida (PhD)

Devorah A. Lieberman (born 1952) is an American academic administrator, currently serving as the 18th President of the University of La Verne.

== Early life and education ==
Lieberman was born in Baltimore, Maryland in 1952 and moved to Covina, California when she was two. Raised in a Jewish household, Lieberman has two brothers. She first became interested in Intercultural Communication after reading Hebrew texts with her father.

Lieberman earned a Bachelor of Arts degree in Communication Studies from Humboldt State University, a Master of Arts in Intercultural Communication from San Diego State University, and a PhD in Intercultural Communication and Gerontology from the University of Florida.

== Career ==
Lieberman was vice provost and special assistant to the president at Portland State University from 1999 to 2004. From 1993 to 1999, she held various other positions at Portland State University, including area director for the Department of Communications and director of teaching and learning excellence at the Center for Academic Excellence. She has served on the faculties at the University of La Verne, Wagner College, Portland State University, and University of Louisiana at Lafayette, teaching in the fields of speech and communications studies. She took office as president of the University of La Verne in 2011.

She currently chairs the board of the Association of Independent California Colleges and Universities and serves on the Western Association of Schools and Colleges Accrediting Commission for Senior Colleges & Universities.

== Personal life ==
Lieberman and her husband, Roger Auerbach, have two daughters, Alicea and Emery, and live in Claremont, California.
