= Sandra Walklate =

British criminologist

Academic background
- Education: BA, 1972, M.Litt, 1975, Lancaster University

Academic work
- Institutions: University of Liverpool

Sandra Walklate is a British criminologist. She is the Eleanor Rathbone Chair of Sociology at the University of Liverpool and President of the British Society of Criminology. In January 2014, she became the Editor in Chief of The British Journal of Criminology.

== Biography ==
Walklate earned her Bachelor of Science degree and Master of Letters from Lancaster University. Upon completing her Master of Letters, Walklate taught at various institutions before accepting a position as the Eleanor Rathbone Chair of Sociology at the University of Liverpool in 2006. While there, she was also a Social Science Academic Advisor to the British Federation of Women Graduates and served as a member of the ESRC Evaluation Committee. In 2014, Walklate was the recipient of the British Society of Criminology's Outstanding Contribution Award. She was also appointed the Editor in Chief of The British Journal of Criminology.

In 2019, Walklate was elected President of the British Society of Criminology for a three-year term.
