= Occupational Medicine (disambiguation) =

Occupational medicine is the branch of medicine which deals with the maintenance of health in the workplace. It may also refer to:

- Occupational Medicine (Hanley & Belfus journal), with the ISO 4 abbreviation Occup. Med., published by Hanley & Belfus from 1986 to 2002.
- Occupational Medicine (Oxford University Press journal), with the ISO 4 abbreviation Occup. Med. (Lond.), established in 1948 and published by Oxford University Press.
- Occupational Medicine (American Medical Association journal), with the ISO 4 abbreviation Occup. Med. (Chic. Ill.), published from 1946 to 1948 by the American Medical Association, which then merged with Journal of Industrial Hygiene and Toxicology to form Archives of Industrial Hygiene and Occupational Medicine.
