= Alec Peterson =

British teacher (1908–1988)

Alexander Duncan Campbell Peterson OBE (13 September 1908 – 17 October 1988) was a British teacher and headmaster, greatly responsible for the birth of the International Baccalaureate educational system. He was instrumental in the formation of the International Baccalaureate Organisation in 1968, and served as the organisation's first director-general until 1977. He was also the first honorary member of the organisation's Council of Foundation from 1983 until his death in 1988.

== Early life and career ==
Peterson was the son of John Peterson an Indian Civil Service official and Flora, and was born in Edinburgh, Scotland. His younger, Sir Arthur Peterson, was a civil servant. He attended Radley College and Balliol College, Oxford. After spending two years as a management trainee became a teacher at Shrewsbury School in 1932.

At the beginning of the Second World War he joined the Ministry of Information and joined the propaganda branch of the Special Operations Executive. He played an important role in South-East Asia, and was largely responsible for the Indian Forward Broadcasting Unit, which was very successful in the Burma campaign. He became deputy director of psychological warfare for South-East Asia Command and was awarded OBE in 1946.

After the war he was appointed headmaster at Adams' Grammar School. He spent two years as Director General, Information Services in Malaya from 1952 to 1954 during the Malayan emergency. He was later headmaster at Dover College, where he set up an international sixth form in 1957. In 1958, he was named head of the Department of Educational Studies at Oxford University, a post he held until 1973. He was the Liberal Party's spokesman on education for some time and served as chairman of the Army Education Board for many years.

He married Corinna May Cochrane, daughter of Sir Arthur Cochrane of the College of Arms. Corrie was a member of the Society of Analytical Psychology and was a tutor at Beech Lawn College Oxford during the 1960s. They had two sons and a daughter.

== Work with the IBO ==
In 1962, Peterson's connections with the military (he had served in Lord Mountbatten of Burma's staff) and his acquaintance with Kurt Hahn earned him a job planning an academic curriculum for the future students of the newly founded Atlantic College in Wales. In 1966, he was named head of the International Schools Examination Syndicate, which was reorganized in 1968 as the International Baccalaureate Organisation.

During the first five years of his time as director-general of the IBO, Peterson continued to live and work in Oxford, despite the fact that the IBO offices were located in Geneva, Switzerland. He remained in his job at Oxford University, retaining the directorial job with the IBO as a part-time work. In 1973, he retired from his Oxford post and took up a part-time teaching job at the Hammersmith and West London College of Further Education, teaching Theory of Knowledge and managing his IBO directorate from London.

Peterson retired in 1977, and he was made an honorary member of the IBO's Council of Foundation in 1983. In 1987, he published the book Schools Across Frontiers: The Story of the International Baccalaureate and the United World Colleges, a historical account on the development of the IB programmes and the United World Colleges closely linked to them.

Peterson died in 1988. The IBO Cardiff Headquarters building, Peterson House, is named after him.

== Views and contributions ==
Peterson campaigned strongly against what he called 'over-specialisation' in British pre-university education. In his 1960 report Arts and Science Sides in the Sixth Form, he vocally described the need for a new kind of educational system, essentially very similar to what the IB Diploma Programme eventually was to become. The new system would provide broader education for students, while maintaining a certain degree of chances for specialisation. He also emphasised the advantages of oral examinations and of assessing analytical skills in examinations rather than the ability to remember specific facts.

Peterson is said to have shaped the entire educational philosophy of the IBO, basing it on his own humanist and liberal beliefs on the concept of education. He felt the very purpose of education to be, to stimulate the mind and encourage critical thought, rather than focussing on simple memorisation of detail. His views are reflected in the structure of the IB Diploma Programme, in the way that it incorporates elements such as the Extended Essay, the CAS programme, and Theory of Knowledge: the student is required to do independent research, to participate in meaningful tasks outside the immediate school community to benefit society, and to develop a concrete image on the nature of knowledge that he comes across in his studies.

Despite his assumption of the task of IBO director-general as only a part-time job, Peterson was very productive in advancing the cause of the International Baccalaureate. He continued to be active in developing the IB long after he retired from the director-general's post at the IBO. Peterson was viewed as very energetic and devoted to his cause, particularly by his colleague Robert Blackburn, who said:

Alec always looked forward. Until the morning of his death (when I had from him two manuscript letters and the copy of a draft speech) he was interested in the introduction of new subjects and new ideas in the IB.

In 1989, the IBO's Council of Foundation established the 'Peterson lectures' in honour of Alec Peterson. These periodical lectures are held by distinguished scholars on subjects pertaining to international education, in an attempt to search for new solutions and ideas on the subject matter.

| Preceded by (none) | IBO director-general 1968–1977 | Succeeded by Gérard Renaud |
