= Abiodun Williams =

Sierra Leonean political scientist

Abiodun "Abi" Williams
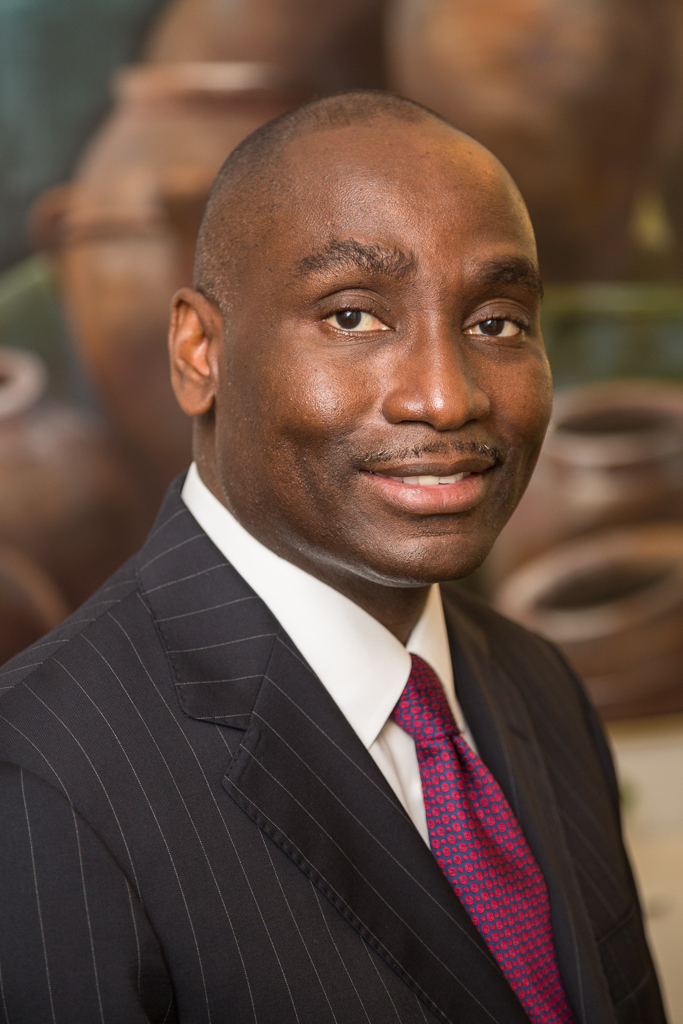

Personal details
- Born: 24 December 1961 (age 64) Freetown, Sierra Leone
- Education: University of Edinburgh Fletcher School of Law and Diplomacy
- Profession: Diplomat, academic

Abiodun Williams (born 1961) is an academic in conflict prevention, peacekeeping, and conflict management. Formerly he was a senior official at the United Nations, and former President of The Hague Institute for Global Justice in The Hague, Netherlands.

== Education ==
Williams was a student at the Sierra Leone Grammar School, and the Lester B. Pearson United World College in British Columbia, Canada, from where he received his International Baccalaureate Diploma. He earned an MA (Honors) in English Language and Literature from the University of Edinburgh, where he was an active debater and won the Student Societies Debating Championship in 1980. He also earned a Master of Arts in Law and Diplomacy (MALD) and a PhD in International Relations from The Fletcher School of Law and Diplomacy where he was the first Annual Commencement Class Speaker.

== Career ==
In 1987-88, Abiodun Williams served as Visiting Assistant Professor at the University of Rochester. From 1988-94, he held an Assistant Professorship at the Walsh School of Foreign Service of Georgetown University. He would return to Georgetown's Walsh School in 2017 as Centennial Fellow.

From 1994 to 2000, Williams served in three peacekeeping operations in Macedonia, Haiti, and Bosnia-Herzegovina as Special Assistant to the Special Representative of the Secretary-General, and Political and Humanitarian Affairs Officer.

From 2001-2007, Williams served as Director of Strategic Planning for United Nations Secretaries-General Ban Ki-moon and Kofi Annan. Thereafter he was Associate Dean of National Defense University (2007-2008) before moving to the United States Institute of Peace (USIP) in Washington, D.C.

From 2008 to 2012, Williams served first as the USIP's Vice President of the Center for Conflict Analysis and Prevention, and later as the USIP's Senior Vice President of the Center for Conflict Management, leading its work in major conflict zones such as Afghanistan, Pakistan, Iraq, Libya, Tunisia, and Egypt.

From 2013 until 2016, Williams served as President of the Hague Institute for Global Justice.

Since 2017, Dr. Williams has served at Tufts University, as Director of its Institute of Global Leadership (2017-2022) and Professor of the Practice of International Politics at The Fletcher School (2017–present) and the Jonathan M. Tisch College of Civic Life (2022–present).

== Awards ==
Abiodun Williams is the recipient of several awards including the Dr. Jean Mayer Global Citizenship Award from Tufts University (2012) and the Constantine E. Maguire Medal from Georgetown University (1990).

== The Hague Institute for Global Justice and allegations of mismanagement ==
On 1 January 2013 Abiodun Williams was appointed as the Institute's first president. He was preceded by Professor Willem van Genugten who served as Interim Dean of the Institute from September 2011 to December 2012. In an article by Dutch magazine De Groene Amsterdammer (4 April 2018), sources argue Williams was interested in the position but stipulated that the title 'international dean' will be replaced by the more authoritative title 'president', this in addition to a high financial compensation for a primarily tax funded non-profit organisation. The Dutch government granted up to 20 million euros in subsidies to the project. According to staff members, Williams did not prioritize fundraising, accounting firms confirmed this claim. Furthermore, according to a reconstruction by Dutch newspaper de Volkskrant, Williams spent thousands of euros on expensive lunches at the nearby Carlton Ambassador hotel and first class flights since 'cattle class' was not good enough for him. A senior researcher quoted in the article indicates that there were many clashes between employees and Williams. According to the researcher cited, Williams was distancing himself from employees: 'Like it was beneath his dignity to talk to me directly. There was a culture clash. We academics are egalitarian. Though he was very focused on hierarchy and quickly felt criticized.' Other former employees mention a 'hostile work environment', where a 'climate of fear' reigns. According to Anja Mihr, the former head of the Rule of Law Program at the institute: "He was not interested in 'boring' studies that gave no prestige. He just did not seem to care." Former Chairman of the Supervisory Board Dick Benschop characterized the management situation as such: "It is rather an authoritarian man than a cooperative foreman...That was clear to me too. I talked to him about it."

Reports claim his financial mismanagement eventually led to his departure in December 2016. In 2013, for instance, Williams claimed 10,205.50 Euro for taxi rides, including a short trip of less than a kilometer from his home to the Dutch Parliament in The Hague, which amounted to 321 Euro. On 29 October he took a cab to Groningen costing 722.25 Euro.

Shortly thereafter, another organization based in The Hague, the Center for International Legal Cooperation, considered a 'structural cooperation' out of a sense of responsibility for the loss of the subsidized funds. After viewing the financial documents, the CILC was startled by the 'deplorable situation'. Allegedly, Williams was seen behind the paper shredder for hours before his departure, which documents in question were destroyed is unclear. Anton Nijssen, Williams's close associate for a long time, has been appointed by the Supervisory Board as' liquidator 'who has to take care of' the (financial) handling of cases'. There are numerous creditors, including the former landlord VNG and the Indisch Herinneringscentrum, which later moved into the spacious building of the former The Hague Institute for Global Justice. Williams's mismanagement is said to have been the main reason for the subsequent failure of the institute. Former board chair Benschop says: "In all fairness, in other circumstances with other people, you might have been able to continue a little longer because you had brought in a little more money."'

Following the reports of the alleged mismanagement, the topic was raised in the Dutch parliament where several political parties have asked parliamentary questions to the Dutch Minister of Economic Affairs and Climate, Eric Wiebes. Willem Moorlag from the Dutch socialist party PvdA asked the minister whether there is any judicial ground to recover the lost funds from Williams and/or the Supervisory Board. The right-wing Forum voor Democratie (FvD) asked the minister why no action was undertaken against Williams when it was already clear after several months that he didn't fulfill his role as fundraiser. Jan Paternotte from the social liberal D66 asked the minister how it was possible that the Institute still received subsidies after a critical report by Price Waterhouse Coopers exposed the financial mismanagement.

== Bibliography ==
=== Books ===
- Kofi Annan and Global Leadership at the United Nations. Author (2024, ISBN 978-0192847423).
- The Brilliant Art of Peace: Lectures from the Kofi Annan Series. Editor (2013, ISBN 978-1-60127-142-6).
- Preventing War: The United Nations and Macedonia. Author (2000, ISBN 978-0742509085)
- Many Voices: Multilateral Negotiations in the World Arena. Editor (1992, ISBN 0813312841).
