= International Baccalaureate =

International educational organization

- Formation: 25 October 1968; 58 years ago
- Headquarters: Geneva, Switzerland
- Website: ibo.org

The International Baccalaureate Organization (IBO), more commonly known as the International Baccalaureate (IB), is a nonprofit foundation headquartered in Geneva, Switzerland, and founded in 1968. It offers four educational programmes: the IB Primary Years Programme for children aged 3 to 12, the IB Middle Years Programme for students aged 12 to 16, as well as the IB Diploma Programme and the IB Career-related Programme for students aged 16 to 19. To teach these programmes, schools must be authorized by the International Baccalaureate.

The organization's name and logo were changed in 2007 to reflect new structural arrangements. Consequently, "IB" may now refer to the organization itself, any of the four programmes, or the diploma or certificates awarded at the end of a programme.

== History ==
=== Inception ===
The foundations of the International Baccalaureate (IB) can be traced back to 1948, when Marie-Thérèse Maurette authored the booklet "Educational Techniques for Peace. Do They Exist?". In this pioneering work, Maurette proposed an education model centered on international understanding and peace—principles that would later shape the core philosophy of the IB Diploma Programme (IBDP). Building on this vision, a group of educators at the International School of Geneva (Ecolint) took steps in the mid-1960s to formalize an international education framework.

They established the International Schools Examinations Syndicate (ISES), which laid the groundwork for a more structured and globally recognized curriculum. Over time, ISES evolved into the International Baccalaureate Office (IBO), which was founded on 25 October 1968, with an office in Geneva, Switzerland, where it is still headquartered. This later evolved into the International Baccalaureate Organization, and is today known as the International Baccalaureate (IB).

=== First programme ===
The IB headquarters were officially established in Geneva, Switzerland, in 1968 for the development and maintenance of the IB Diploma Programme. The objective of this programme was to "provide an internationally acceptable university admissions qualification suitable for the growing mobile population of young people whose parents were part of the world of diplomacy, international and multinational organizations" by offering standardized courses and assessments for students aged 16 to 19.

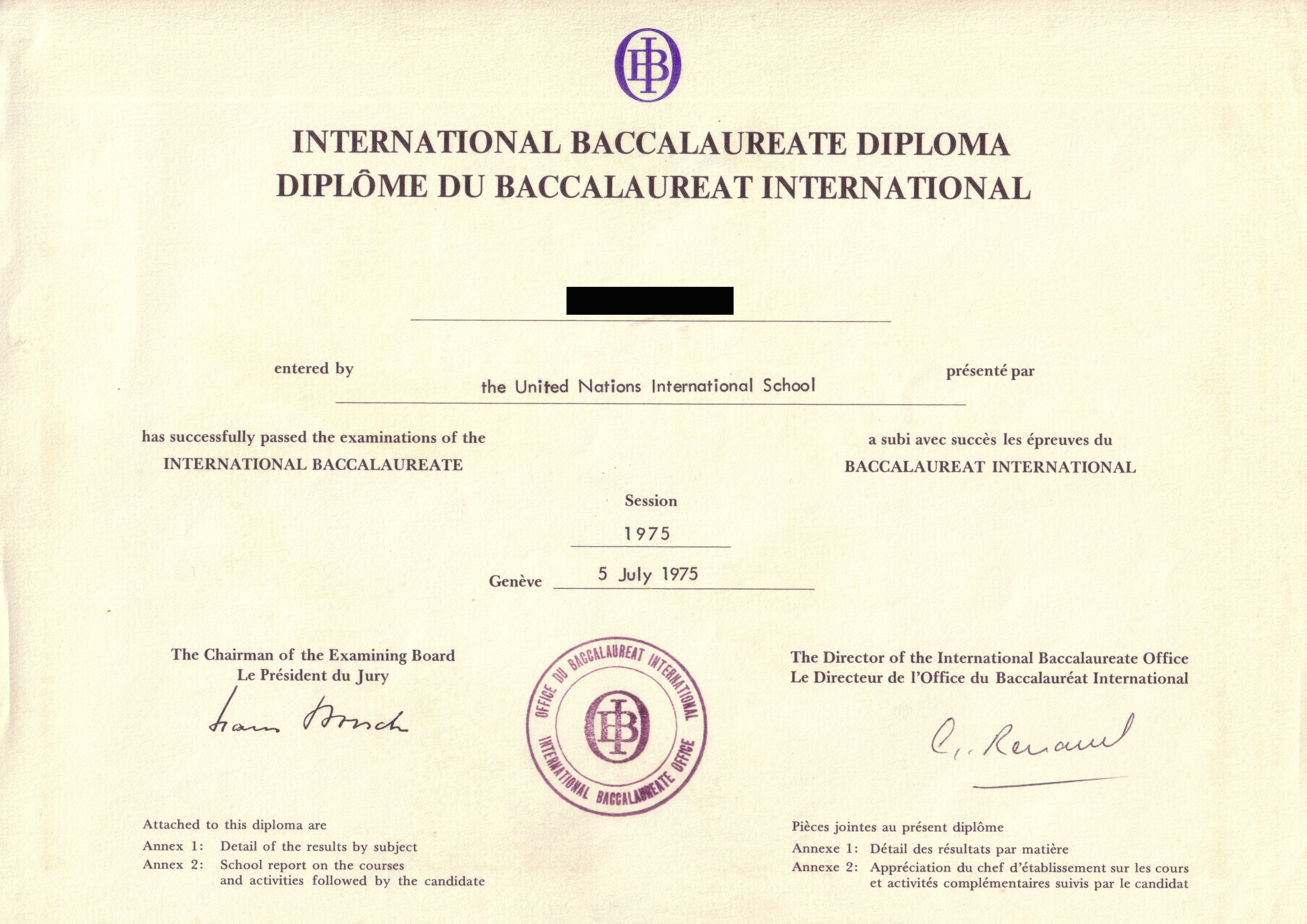
An early IB diploma from 1975, issued through the United Nations International School (UNIS) in New York, one of the pilot schools for the IB

International Baccalaureate North America (IBNA) was established in 1975, International Baccalaureate Africa, Europe and Middle-East (IBAEM) in 1986, and International Baccalaureate Asia Pacific (IBAP) during the same period.

=== Other programmes ===
The IB Middle Years Programme (MYP) was first offered in 1994. Within five years, 51 countries had MYP schools. A revised MYP programme, referred to as the MYP: Next Chapter was introduced in September 2014, though by 2019, it had transitioned into the MYP. The MYP program spans for a duration of 5 years, with an examination known as the e-Assessment at the end of the fifth year assessing students' knowledge in a range of 8 subject groups. This includes Mathematics (offered in Standard/Extended level), Language & Literature, Language Acquisition, Sciences (offered as Integrated Sciences or Biology, Chemistry, and Physics separately), Individuals & Societies (offered as Integrated Humanities or Geography and History separately), as well as a portfolio subject involving a year-long project and documentation. Lastly, the program also includes a Personal Project through which students can apply their knowledge and understanding to a personal interest. Each of the 8 subject groups carries 7 points towards a total grade out of 56

The IB Primary Years Programme (PYP) was piloted in 1996 in 30 primary schools on different continents, and the first PYP school was authorized in 1997, with 87 authorized schools in 43 countries within five years.

The IB Career-related Programme (formerly IB Career-related Certificate) was first offered in 2012.

=== Directors general ===
Alec Peterson was IB's first director general (1968–1977), followed by Gérard Renaud (1977–1983), Roger Peel (1983–1998), Derek Blackman (1998–1999), George Walker (1999–2005), Jeffrey Beard (2006–2013) and Siva Kumari (2013–2021).

As of May 2021, Olli-Pekka Heinonen, a Finnish politician and director of the Finnish National Agency of Education, was selected by the board of directors to serve as director general, replacing Siva Kumari.

== Organization and Headquarters ==
The International Baccalaureate was founded in Geneva, Switzerland, where it is still headquartered. Today, the IB maintains a Foundation Office in Geneva, which handles legal and executive functions. The IB Global Centre in Cardiff, Wales handles assessment and examination related tasks such as producing and marking exam scripts for all regions.

There are three other IB Global Centres, which are the headquarters for the global regional centres:

1. IB Global Centre, Singapore – Administers the IB Asia-Pacific (IBAP) region.
2. IB Global Centre, The Hague, the Netherlands – Administers the IB Africa, Europe and Middle East (IBAEM) region.
3. IB Global Centre, Washington D.C., United States of America – Administers the IB Americas (IBA) region.

Sub-regional associations "are groups formed by and for IB school practitioners to assist IB schools, teachers and students in their communities—from implementing IB programmes to providing a forum for dialogue." There are currently fifty-six sub-regional associations, including:

- fifteen in the IB Africa, Europe and Middle East (IBAEM) region;
- thirty-six in the IB Americas (IBA) region;
- five in the IB Asia Pacific (IBAP) region.

In 2003, the IB established the IB Fund, incorporated in the United States, to enhance fundraising and keep funds raised separately from operational funds. In 2004, the IB approved a strategic plan to "ensure that programmes and services are of the highest quality" and "to provide access to people who are socio-economically disadvantaged." In 2010 and 2015, the strategic plans were updated after substantial consultation. The vision for the next five years was to more consciously establish the IB as a leader in international education and the Board outlined a vision and four strategic goals with key strategic objectives.

Access remains fundamental to the mission of the IB and a variety of initiatives and projects are helping to take it forward in Ecuador, Poland, Romania, the Czech Republic, South Africa, Kazakhstan, Spain, Philippines, Malaysia, Japan, and South Korea.

The United States has the largest number of IB programmes (2,010 out of 5,586) offered in both private and public schools.

The IB works with governments and non-governmental organizations across the world and has consultative status as a nongovernmental organization (NGO) at the United Nations Educational, Scientific and Cultural Organization (UNESCO) and has collaborative relationships with the Council of Europe and the Organisation Internationale de la Francophonie (OIF).

== Uneven distribution and controversy ==
While the IB program places emphasis on its global focus and distribution of its program, access to its curriculum remains uneven and often concentrated in upper class, urban areas. As the organization has itself acknowledged, "despite our best intentions, our growth is not distributed evenly... indeed; there is good evidence to show that our growth is mainly benefitting the economically advantaged. Even in high-income countries, we know that the majority of students come from better socio-economic backgrounds". This admission demonstrates the ways in which the programme’s expansion has maintained broader patterns of academic inequality, spurring on the "opportunity hoarding" by those with privilege". Jennen and Guler emphasize the financial barriers to participation further, as students from more affluent communities, wherein student fees were supplied by parents, were more likely to complete the programme. This advantage is reinforced by greater familial support, as well as higher levels of parental education, both of which contribute to improved academic outcomes and attainment of the IB diploma.

In the United States and Canada, this inequality bleeds into broader intersectional dynamics of racial oppression and poverty, with Hispanic and Black students being underrepresented within IB programmes in the United States. Further supporting this trend, a study which matched IB and non-IB U.S. public schools based upon state, enrollment, and grade span found that while poverty alone was not consistently associated with the presence of the IB programme, there is a strong correlation between reduced IB availability and high poverty areas with diversified or highly concentrated minority populations. Likewise, another study found that "The opportunity for IBDP—a highly structured, academically rigorous curricular program—to improve academic preparation for college continues to vary based on students’ family income and race/ethnicity", with lower outcomes for schools with greater concentrations of economically disadvantaged, racialized students. These findings ultimately work into broader studies which demonstrate that advanced academic programs are often stratified along racial and class divides, providing poorer educational outcomes for disadvantaged individuals.

== Governance ==
The IB governance is composed of an IB Board of Governors and six committees (access and advancement, audit, education, finance, human resources and governance). The Board of Governors appoints the Director General, sets the strategic direction of the organization, adopts a mission statement, makes policy, oversees the IB's financial management, and ensures autonomy and integrity of the IB Diploma Programme examinations and other student assessments. The structure of its different committees is based on respect, representation and collaboration.

The Board of Governors can comprise between 15 and 25 members. Members are elected by the Board on the recommendation of the governance committee and from nominations presented by the Heads Council, Regional Councils and the Board. To encourage diversity of gender, culture and geography, there are only three ex officio positions: Director General (non-voting), the chair of the Examining Board and the chair of the Heads Council.

Advisory bodies include the Heads Council and Regional Councils.

== Reception ==
Countries with 40+ schools teaching IB programmes & Global Totals (as of 19 Oct 2026)
Country and region	Primary	Middle	Diploma	Career-related	Schools
United States	-	-	-	-	-
Canada	-	-	-	-	-
China	-	-	-	-	-
Australia	-	-	-	-	-
India	185	86	198	43	277
Spain	-	-	-	-	-
United Kingdom	-	-	-	-	-
Mexico	-	-	-	-	-
Turkey	-	-	-	-	-
Japan	-	-	-	-	-
Germany	-	-	-	-	-
Ecuador	-	-	-	-	-
Hong Kong	-	-	-	-	-
Indonesia	-	-	-	-	-
Poland	-	-	-	-	-
Switzerland	13	14	50	5	56
United Arab Emirates	39	30	59	22	66
Argentina	5	2	56	0	57
Brazil	44	22	65	0	51
South Korea	41	18	34	0	110-118
Egypt	26	34	45	0	54
Singapore	23	10	30	3	41
Nigeria	1	1	3	0	4
	Primary	Middle	Diploma	Career-related	Schools
Total Schools Globally	-	-	-	-	-
Countries & Territories	-	-	-	-	-

The IB Diploma Programme was described as "a rigorous, off-the-shelf curriculum recognized by universities around the world" when it was featured in the 18 December 2006, edition of Time titled "How to bring our schools out of the 20th Century". The IBDP was also featured in the summer 2002 edition of American Educator, where Robert Rothman described it as "a good example of an effective, instructionally sound, exam-based system."

In the US, in 2006, as part of the American Competitiveness Initiative (ACI), President George W. Bush and Education Secretary Margaret Spellings presented a plan for the expansion of Advanced Placement (AP) and International Baccalaureate mathematics and science courses, intending to increase the number of AP and IB teachers and the number of students taking AP and IB examinations, as well as tripling the number of students passing those exams. Howard Gardner, a professor of educational psychology at Harvard University, said that the IBDP curriculum is "less parochial than most American efforts" and helps students "think critically, synthesize knowledge, reflect on their own thought processes and get their feet wet in interdisciplinary thinking."

In 2006, government ministers in the United Kingdom provided funding so that "every local authority in England could have at least one centre offering sixth-formers the chance to do the IB." In 2008, due to the devaluing of the A-Levels and an increase in the number of students taking the IB exams, then-Children's Secretary Ed Balls abandoned a "flagship Tony Blair pledge to allow children in all areas to study IB." Fears of a "two-tier" education system further dividing education between the rich and the poor emerged as the growth in IB is driven by private schools and sixth-form colleges. While the number of Diploma Programme state schools has dropped under budget constraints, the new Career-related Programme has seen solid uptake in the UK with 27 schools in Kent alone.

In 2006, an attempt was made to eliminate it from a public school in Pittsburgh, Pennsylvania. Some schools in the United States have eliminated the IBDP due to budgetary reasons and low student participation. In Utah, in 2008, funding for the IBDP was reduced from $300,000 to $100,000 after State Senator Margaret Dayton objected to the IB curriculum, stating, "First, I have never espoused eliminating IB ... I don't want to create 'world citizens' nearly as much as I want to help cultivate American citizens who function well in the world." Mayor Rahm Emanuel of Chicago, meanwhile, believes that IB should be an option for students in Chicago Public Schools. Elizabeth Brackett, reporting on her own experience of studying the IB in Chicago, found that it made for a stressful school experience but subsequently eased the pressures of university study. A further report by the University of Chicago concluded that Chicago Public School students who completed the IB curriculum were 40% more likely to attend a four-year college, 50% more likely to attend a selective four-year college, and significantly more likely to persist in college than their matched peers outside the IB. The City of Miami Beach Commission entered into an education compact with Miami-Dade County Public Schools with one of the initiatives of the compact to implement the IB curriculum throughout Miami Beach feeder schools.

In some other parts of the world, the International Baccalaureate has been well received.

The Asia-Pacific region has witnessed the fastest global adoption of the programme since 2010, tied to the privileging of English as a global cultural and symbolic capital and the diploma as an aspirational conduit for traditional and emerging middle classes in these regions, especially in Singapore and Hong Kong. In 2013, the Ministry of Education, Culture, Sports, Science and Technology of Japan and the IB announced a plan that will expand the opportunities for Japanese students to complete the IB curriculum in Japanese. In Malaysia, a project has been developed in response to interest expressed by the Malaysia Ministry of Education (MoE) in working with the IB to implement the IB Middle Years Programme (MYP) in select secondary state schools.

The Abu Dhabi Education Council (ADEC) signed an agreement with the IB to widen the options offered to parents and to meet the different needs of students in the United Arab Emirates. In April 2014, The King Faisal Foundation in Saudi Arabia and the IB signed a memorandum of understanding to develop IB programmes, including the IBDP, in up to forty primary and secondary schools, with the goal of intending to develop these schools as centres of excellence as IB World Schools. In Peru, President Ollanta Humala has committed to building a high-performing schools network (COAR) made up of IB World Schools. In early 2016 thirteen new schools were authorized by the IB as part of this programme. In Ecuador, President Rafael Correa has also committed to improving education in state schools by implementing IB programmes and by January 2016 there were over 200 state schools. With support from local organizations, there are thirteen state IB schools in Russia. In Spain, various models have been implemented (3 types of schools in Spain: public schools, private schools and state funded-private or "concerted" schools) and led to extensive growth with 140 schools.

Internationally, the IB continues to be recognized as innovative, and in 2014, the World Innovation Summit for Education (WISE) announced the IB Career-related Certificate as a finalist for their annual WISE Awards. However, the IB came under heavy criticism around the world in 2020 for controversial estimated grades, set when COVID-19 precautions obstructed examinations.

According to tertiary educational agency 7Acad, the diploma mean grade stands at a four-year low of 4.54 points, with total points at a five-year low of 28.51 pts as of 2019.

A study published by the University of Cambridge showed that a Cambridge student, who had obtained a score of 41 or more, achieved above-average success while at Cambridge. Students who had received 38 or less, were receiving grades below the average of all Cambridge students. Those that had an IB score of 38 or 39, obtained above-average grades in science, and below-average grades in social studies and humanities.

== Controversies ==
=== Marking guides plagiarism ===
In October 2010, the IBO was found to have plagiarised some of its confidential examiner marking guides from Wikipedia.

=== Russian invasion of Ukraine ===
Following the Russian invasion of Ukraine in 2022, the International Baccalaureate Organization (IB) initially restricted its operations in Russia, halting new school authorizations. However, unlike many other international educational institutions, IB continued its activities in the country, allowing existing schools to operate under its curriculum. This decision has been criticized for contradicting global sanctions and ethical stances taken by other organizations.

On 25 August 2025, the Office of the Prosecutor General of Russia accused the International Baccalaureate Organisation of shaping "Russian youth according to Western templates, ... imposing its own interpretation of historical processes, distorting well-known facts, spreading anti-Russian propaganda and fomenting interethnic discord." Subsequently, the organisation was designated as "undesirable" by the Russian government, a status that prohibits it from distributing materials or running programmes in the country.

In response, the International Baccalaureate stated that it "is not affiliated with any political body... we affirm our belief that every learner deserves access to rigorous, future-focused education."

=== May 2020 examination results ===
In March 2020, the IB announced that exams for the May 2020 session had been cancelled as a response to the COVID-19 pandemic. It claimed that the final grades would instead be calculated based on coursework, students' teacher-predicted grades, and historical school data. "Prior to the attribution of final grades, this process was subjected to rigorous testing by educational statistical specialists to ensure our methods were robust. It was also checked against the last five years' sets of results data," an IB spokesman said. In July 2020, the IB released its results for the Diploma Programme and Career-related Programme candidates enrolled in the May 2020 session. Over 17,000 signatories signed an online petition calling for a clarification of the grading methodology, and free remarking and retesting. Several educators have criticized IB's approach to the 2020 grading. The Office of Qualifications and Examinations Regulation stated it would "scrutinize" the grades. The Norwegian Data Protection Authority asked the IB to provide data under the General Data Protection Regulation.

Some argued that using a school's historical data to produce grades was unfair to black or low-income students, or students from smaller schools. Others complained about the lack of transparency and fair process of the grades' appeal process.

=== May 2021 examination session ===
In August 2020, amidst the continuing coronavirus pandemic, the IB announced a series of comprehensive amendments to its scheduled examinations in May 2021. They were inclusive of a few assessment components being discounted (for select subjects), and others being revised in length or syllabi. On 4 February 2021, the IB announced a dual exam route for the May 2021 examination: examinations were expected to take place in regions where a written assessment could be "administered safely", while candidates in other regions follow a non-exam "alternative route" based on coursework and predicted grades. This decision was met with stiff backlash as students taking the IB Diploma Programme protested against perceived injustice. Students argued that exams would harm student mental health and well-being as well as possible consequences for university admissions. The IB's dual system approach has also been criticized by exam boards such as Cambridge Assessment International Education, who canceled their IGCSE and international A-level exams.

=== May 2024 examination leaks ===
In late April/early May, select IB final exams were leaked to the subreddit r/pirateIB and other platforms. To date, there have been documents shared for Mathematics, Physics, Biology, Chemistry, English, Chinese, German, Psychology, Digital Society, Geography, Business Management, Computer Science and Global Politics. Some online forums have been expressing student discontent, especially with concerns on unfair advantages in examinations, with claims of miscommunication from the IB. A statement from the IBO was published on 4 May, claiming that the organization had discovered a very small number of students engaged in "time zone cheating", further claiming that the cheating was not widespread. South China Morning Post rebutted this claim, having discovered over 45,000 downloads of papers. Significant numbers of students have raised concerns about grade boundaries being inflated as a result of the leaks. One group dedicated to leaking papers has affirmed the concerns, by restricting the release of English Lang. Lit. leaks to "protect the grade boundaries".

Following the examination leaks, the IBO also experienced an alleged security breach in their IT Infrastructure, potentially exposing internal documents and further test papers. Upon inspecting data shared online by the unknown threat actor(s), vx-underground, a group dedicated to investigating malware and cybersecurity, confirmed on the morning of 6 May that the breach appeared to be legitimate. On 7 May, the IBO confirmed that some of their data from 2018 was breached, including employee names, positions, and emails. The organization also stated that no exam material had been compromised.

=== May 2026 examination session in the Middle East ===
During the May 2026 examination session, the International Baccalaureate announced support measures for schools and candidates affected by disruption in parts of the Middle East. The countries included in this process were: Bahrain, Iran, Iraq, Israel, Jordan, Kuwait, Lebanon, Oman, Palestine, Qatar, Saudi Arabia, and the United Arab Emirates. These included coursework deadline extensions, access arrangements, transfer of registration to another IB World School, deferral of examinations to a later session at no extra cost, or withdrawal with a full refund. The IB later stated that examinations were expected to proceed in most cases, but that in exceptional circumstances where written examinations could not be conducted safely, government authorities could apply the Non-Exam Contingency Measure (NECM), under which results would be based on externally assessed coursework and teacher-predicted grades using IB quality assurance processes. The measure was described as applying to affected candidates in the region, rather than as a general change to the wider May 2026 Time Zone 2 examination route.

== See also ==
- Cambridge International Education
- European Baccalaureate
- List of International Baccalaureate people
- Schools offering International Baccalaureate
- Advanced Placement
