= Arthur Peterson (civil servant) =

British public servant

Sir Arthur William Peterson KCB MVO (22 May 1916 - 8 May 1986) was a British civil servant who served as Permanent Under-Secretary of State at the Home Office. As such he was the senior civil servant and permanent head of the Home Office, one of the most senior civil service roles in government. (Note: Quote from Professor Tony Dean, formerly Secretary of the Ontario Cabinet and Head of the Ontario Public Service: "The job of a Permanent Secretary of a department is huge in its own right.") He also pioneered the use of psychologists in British prisons.

== Career ==
Born in Calcutta, Peterson was educated at Shrewsbury School and Merton College, Oxford. He was the younger brother of Alec Peterson, the educational reformer.

Peterson joined the civil service in 1938. During the Second World War, he served in the Ministry of Home Security. He served as principal private secretary to the Home Secretary, from 1946 to 1949. In 1957, Peterson was a special adviser to Rab Butler, whilst Butler was Home Secretary. Peterson became a specialist on the management of prisons and was appointed Chairman of the Prison Commission. He introduced the first psychologists to British prisons.

Peterson went on to serve as Permanent Under-Secretary of State at the Home Office from 1972 to 1977. In that role, he suggested alterations to arrangements for Armistice Day – or even cancelling it altogether. In 1975, he also provided evidence to the United Kingdom Prison Services Committee and warned members of parliament about what activities prisoners in UK prisons might get involved in, without strict controls. The evidence and papers he provided to members of parliament are held in the National Archives.

He was Chairman of the British Refugee Council from 1981 to 1986. Between 1968 and 1985 he was Chairman of the Romney Street Group.

== Honours ==
- Member of the Royal Victorian Order, 1953
- Companion of the Order of the Bath, 1963
- Knight Commander of the Order of the Bath, 1973
