= Tim Newburn =

British criminologist

William Henry Timothy Newburn (born 4 July 1959) is a British criminologist. He is an academic, specialising in criminology and policing.

== Career ==
He was president of the British Society of Criminology from 2005 to 2008, director of the Mannheim Centre for Criminology from 2003 to 2008 and is currently head of the Department of Social Policy at the London School of Economics and Political Science. From 1997, he was Director of the Public Policy Research Unit at Goldsmiths College and has previously worked at the Policy Studies Institute, the National Institute for Social Work, the Home Office and Leicester University.

He has published widely on crime and the police, his publications include Criminology (2007) and the Handbook of Policing (2008). He has also written for The Independent.

In 2017, Newburn published a third edition of Criminology, a follow-up to his 2013 Second Edition. It is 1143 pages long and provides an in-depth analysis of crime and criminology, as well as the theories and concepts related to it.

== Selected publications ==
- The official history of criminal justice in England and Wales: Volume V: policing post-war Britain: plus ça change. Routledge, 2025.
- Orderly Britain: How Britain has resolved everyday problems, from dog fouling to double parking. Hachette, 2022.
- The SAGE Handbook of Criminological Theory. 2012.
- Policy Transfer and Criminal Justice: Exploring US Influence over British Crime Control Policy. Open University Press, 2007.
- Policing: Key Readings. Willan, 2005.
- Dealing With Disaffection: Young People, Mentoring, and Social Inclusion. Willan, 2005.
- Youth offending and restorative justice: implementing reform in youth justice. Willan, 2003.
- Policing, Surveillance and Social Control. Willan, 2002.
- The Future of Policing. Clarendon Press, 1997.
- Just Boys Doing Business? Men, masculinities and crime. Routledge, 1994.
