= Jeffrey Beard =

American businessman

Jeffrey R. Beard is an American manager. He was appointed to become director-general of the International Baccalaureate (IB), based in Geneva, Switzerland, starting on January 1, 2006, following the retirement of the previous director-general, George Walker.

Beard gave a speech at Chautauqua Institution in August 2010 on reforming education. Chautauqua Institution officials later discovered the speech was not Beard's original work, as it drew heavily upon a speech given earlier in the year by Sir Ken Robinson at a TED conference. According to a letter printed in the Chautauquan Daily, Beard used "identical quotes, phrasing and even anecdotes." The Institution issued an apology to those who attended the talk, saying "Beard's behavior in this matter is not characteristic of the work done here at Chautauqua and violates the expectations you should have for that work. We acknowledge to you our genuine disappointment in this event." Beard's explanation was that he had not intended to pass off the work he quoted as his own, but acknowledged that he could and should have made it more obvious that he was citing the work of others, most particularly Sir Ken Robinson, whom he admires greatly and quotes frequently.

After his term at IB, Beard was hired in 2014 by GEMS Education to lead the development and innovation of its education programmes.

Preceded by George Walker	IBO director-general 2006–2013	Succeeded by Dr. Siva Kumari
