= David Morphet =

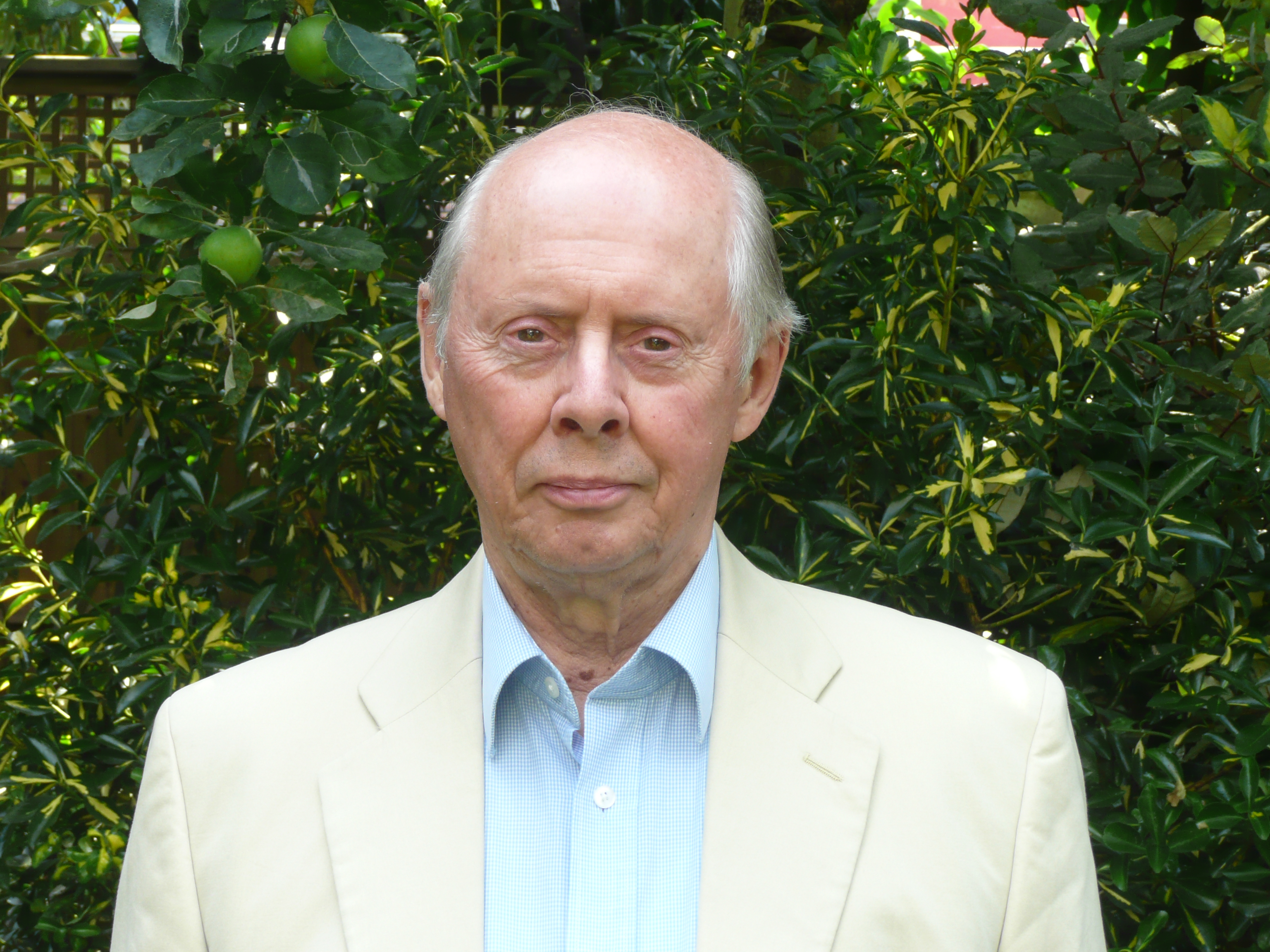
David Morphet

David Morphet is a poet and writer who has worked in the Diplomatic Service, the Department of Energy and private industry.

Born on 24 January 1940, he grew up in a Pennine valley near Huddersfield. From King James's Grammar School, Almondbury, he went on a history scholarship to St John's College, Cambridge, where he gained a Double First in English and became co-editor of the literary magazine Delta.

In 1961 he entered the Diplomatic Service, serving in the Middle East and Spain. In 1966–68, he was a private secretary to two foreign secretaries, Michael Stewart and George Brown and accompanied the latter to the Special Session of the United Nations in New York, following the Arab-Israeli Six-Day War.

Joining the newly established Department of Energy in 1974, he became the UK governor at the International Energy Agency in Paris from 1983 to 1985 and from 1985 to 1989 UK governor at the International Atomic Energy Agency (IAEA) in Vienna. As governor at the IAEA, he attended the agency's Post-Accident Review Meeting following the Chernobyl disaster, and initiated safety discussions between the UK Nuclear Installations Inspectorate and its equivalents in Eastern Europe.

During 1978 and 1979 he was seconded as deputy chairman (chief executive) of the Midlands Electricity Board, one of the twelve Area Electricity Boards in England and Wales, where he backed new computer-based systems and a streamlined management structure. Returning to the Department of Energy, he successively headed the Electricity, Energy Policy and Atomic Energy divisions, advising Ministers on relations with the Electricity Council, the Central Electricity Generating Board (CEGB), the UK Atomic Energy Authority (UKAEA) and British Nuclear Fuels Ltd (BNFL).

Moving to the private sector in 1989, he held senior positions in the power and construction companies BICC and Balfour Beatty and served on the council of the CBI. From 1993 to 2001 he was a director of Barking Power Ltd, owner and operator of the 1000 MW combined-cycle gas-fired Barking Power Station in London.

Following the privatisation of British Rail in 1997, he was invited to lead a new industry-wide body, the Railway Forum, established to promote growth and common purpose through dialogue between the multiple successors to British Rail. He retired from this position in December 2000.

With a strong interest in the treatment of mental illness and in mental aftercare, in 1972 he became a founder member of the National Schizophrenia Fellowship (now Rethink) and was its chairman from 1977 to 1982.

He has published thirteen volumes of verse, the biography of a Victorian journalist, articles on Victorian journalism, and has edited a book on St John's College, Cambridge. From 2005 to 2009 he was on the Board of Magma Poetry, for which he has written reviews and articles. He edited Magma 39 (Winter 2007/08 issue). His verse has appeared in a number of magazines.

He was the Chairman of the Romney Street Group, current affairs lunch club which meets weekly in the Athenaeum, from 1997 to 2004.

He has written a series of poems on Dentdale in the Yorkshire Dales National Park, with which both he and his wife have family associations.

He married Sarah Gillian Sedgwick in 1968. They have three children and five grandchildren.

== Bibliography ==
=== Biography ===
Louis Jennings MP, Editor of the New York Times and Tory Democrat (Notion Books:2001) ISBN 0-9541573-0-3

=== Poetry ===
Seventy-Seven Poems (Notion Books:2002) ISBN 0-9541573-1-1

The Angel and the Fox (Notion Books:2003) ISBN 0-9541573-2-X

Approaching Animals from A to Z (Notion Books:2004) ISBN 0-9541573-3-8

52 Ways of Looking (Notion Books:2005) ISBN 0-9541573-4-6

The Silence of Green (Notion Books:2007) ISBN 0-9541573-5-4

The Maze: a daydream in five cantos (Notion Books:2009) ISBN 0-9541573-6-2

The Intruders and other poems (Notion Books:2010) ISBN 0-9541573-7-0

Lyrics from the Periodic Table (Notion Books:2011) ISBN 978-0-9541573-8-8

A sequence from the Cyclades (Notion Books:2012) ISBN 978-0-9541573-9-5

Night Train to Utopia (Notion Books:2013) ISBN 978-0-9575458-0-9

Satires and Legacies (Notion Books:2014) ISBN 978-0-9575458-1-6

Homecoming by Microlight (Notion Books:2015) ISBN 978-0-9575458-2-3

Brief Encounters (Notion Books:2016) ISBN 978-0-9575458-3-0

The Wranglers and other poems (Notion Books 2017) ISBN 978-0-9575458-4-7

Another Planet Earth (Notion Books 2018) ISBN 978-0-9575458-5-4

Goodbye to Angel and Fox, and other poems (Notion Books 2021) ISBN 978-0-9575458-6-1

Ring of Islands (Notion Books 2022) No ISBN

Twelve Poems of the Sea (Notion Books 2023) No ISBN

'Political Comment in the Quarterly Review after Croker: Gladstone, Salisbury and Jennings': Victorian Periodicals Review (ISSN 0709-4698: Vol 36, No 2, Summer 2003: pp 109–134)

Entries on Croker, Gifford, Jennings, Lockhart, and The Quarterly Review in Dictionary of Nineteenth Century Journalism (2009: ISBN 978-0-7123-5039-6)

'John Wilson Croker's Image of France in the Quarterly Review': electronic British Library Journal article no 1, 2012

=== Edited ===
St John's College, Cambridge – Excellence and Diversity (2007): Third Millennium Publishing Ltd. ISBN 1-903942-56-X

=== Sources ===
Who's Who A & C Black 2017
