= Criminology & Criminal Justice =

Academic journal

Criminology and Criminal Justice
- Discipline: Criminology
- Language: English
- Edited by: Adam Crawford

Publication details
- Former name: Criminal Justice
- History: 2001-present
- Publisher: SAGE Publications
- Frequency: 5/year
- Impact factor: 1.3 (2024)

Standard abbreviations
- ISO 4: Criminol. Crim. Justice

Indexing
- ISSN: 1748-8958 (print); 1748-8966 (web)
- LCCN: 2006267591
- OCLC no.: 7767792

Links
- Journal homepage; Online access; Online archive

Criminology & Criminal Justice is a peer-reviewed academic journal covering the field of criminology. The journal's editors-in-chief are Loraine Gelsthorpe and Pamela Ugwudike. It was established in 2001 and is published by SAGE Publications in association with the British Society of Criminology.

== Abstracting and indexing ==
The journal is abstracted and indexed in Scopus and the Social Sciences Citation Index. According to the Journal Citation Reports, the journal has a 2024 impact factor of 1.3.
