= The Hague Institute for Global Justice =

International think tank

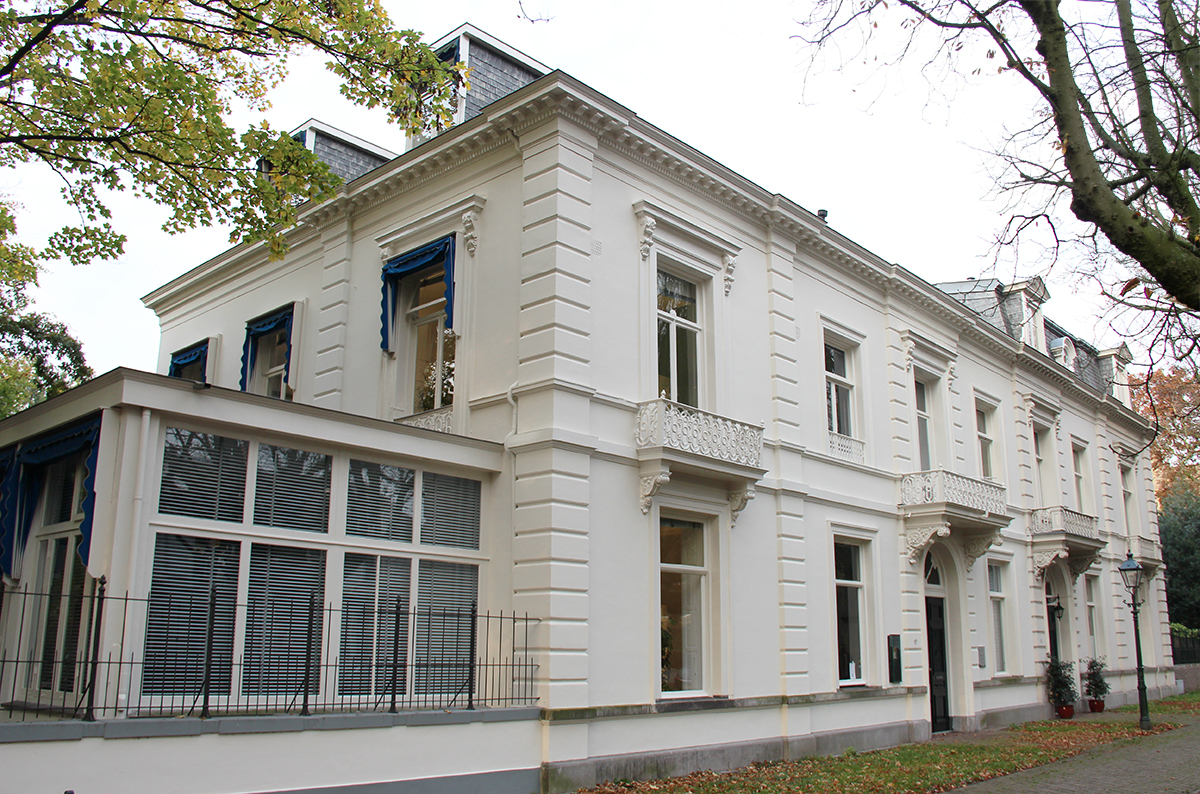
- The Hague Institute headquarters
- Abbreviation: The Hague Institute; THIGJ
- Formation: 2011; 15 years ago
- Type: International think tank
- Headquarters: The Hague, Netherlands
- President: Sohair Salam Saber (2019–present)
- Website: thehagueinstituteforglobaljustice.org

The Hague Institute for Global Justice, often referred to as simply The Hague Institute or THIGJ, is an international think tank located in The Hague, Netherlands. It was established in 2011 by a consortium of partners including the Municipality of The Hague, an academic coalition of Hague-based organizations and with support from the Dutch government. Its current president is Jordanian businesswoman Sohair Salam Saber.

== History ==
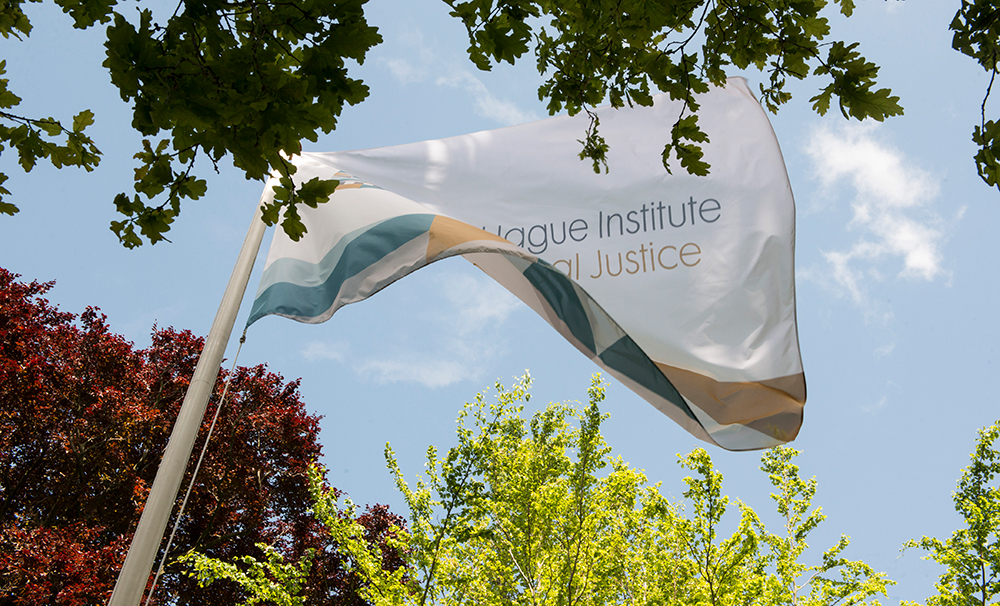
Flag of The Hague Institute

The Hague Institute was founded in 2011 by a consortium of partners including the Municipality of The Hague and an academic coalition of Hague-based organizations, with support from the Dutch government. Its stated aim, to "contribute to, and further strengthen, the global framework for preventing and resolving conflict and promoting international peace."

Nico Schrijver, academic director of the Grotius Centre for International Legal Studies at Leiden University, served as the Institute's first dean between January and August 2011. Willem van Genugten served as interim dean of the Institute from September 2011 to December 2012. He was succeeded by the Institute's first president, Abiodun Williams, the former senior vice president of the Center for Conflict Management at the United States Institute of Peace (USIP) on January 1, 2013.

=== Williams tenure ===
In articles by the Dutch magazine De Groene Amsterdammer and the Dutch newspaper De Volkskrant, as well as in a report published by Price Waterhouse Coopers, Williams was accused of a failure to "acquire external resources" to allow the Institute to function beyond the €20 million in subsidies granted to the Institute by the Dutch government. Williams was also accused of maintaining "exorbitant expense reports" while fostering a hostile work environment.

=== Bankruptcy and revival ===
By 2018 the Institute was insolvent, closing its doors in April of that year. The Institute was declared bankrupt in May 2018.

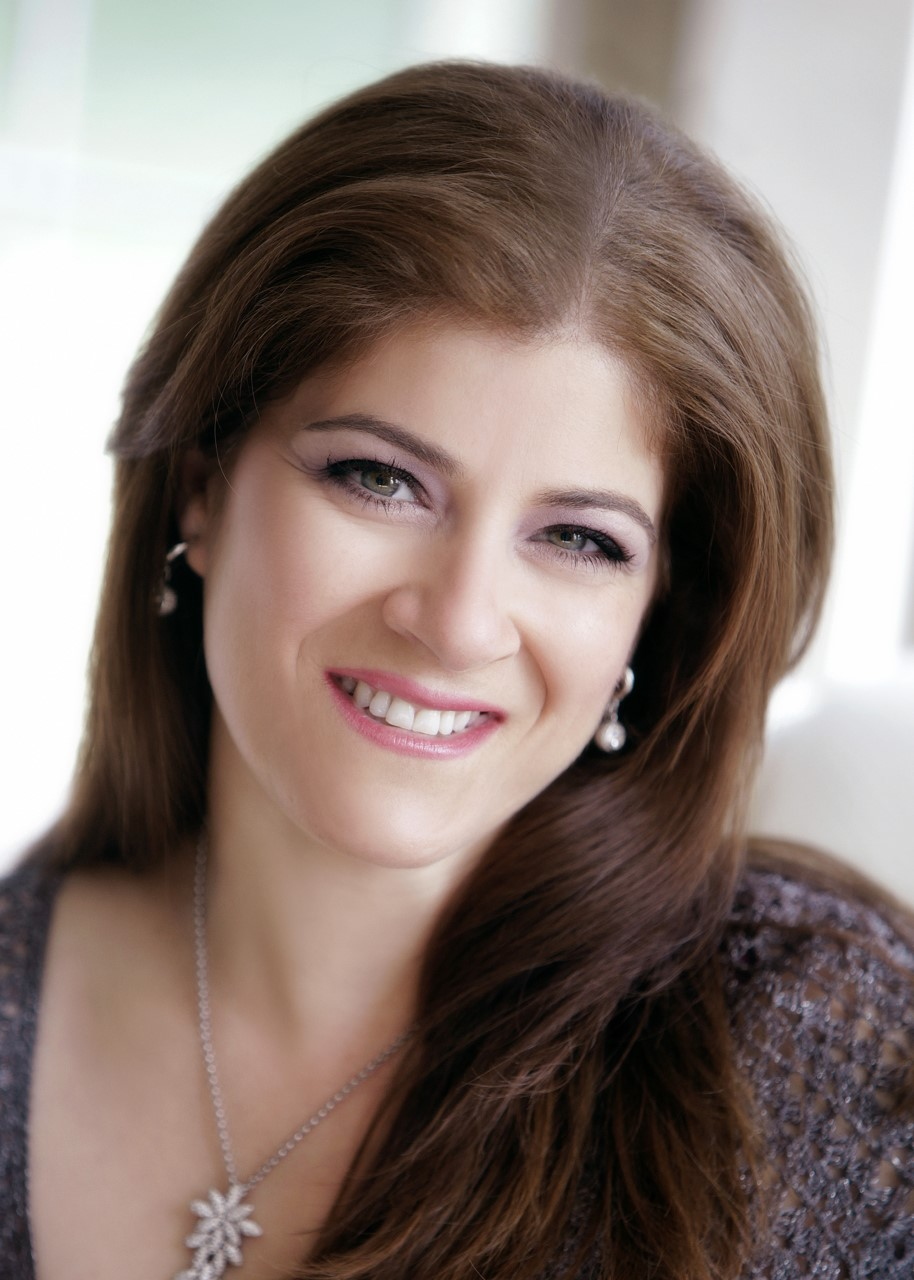
Sohair Salam Saber, the current president of the Hague Institute

In July 2018, following talks between the Institute and Sohair Salam Saber, a Jordanian businesswoman, a declaration of intent to continue the Institute was announced. In September 2018, Saber purchased the Institute.

On 29 January 2019, at Nieuwspoort at the Dutch parliamentary building, Saber was announced as the Institute's second president. During the event, Mahmoud Abuwasel was announced as vice president of the Institute.

In June 2022, the Institute requested observer status with the United Nations Committee on the Peaceful Uses of Outer Space.

== Advisory board ==
The Institute's leadership is supported by a panel of advisors consisting of individuals who have previously held political, diplomatic and legal positions in various countries. As of 2023, its members are:

- Toine Beukering
- Tim Broas
- Nikolaos van Dam
- Élisabeth Guigou
- Devorah Lieberman
- Salaheddine Mezouar
- Hani Mulki
- Vesna Pusić
- Cynthia P. Schneider
- Robert Serry
- Anne-Grete Strøm-Erichsen
- Ben Swagerman
- Cevat Yerli
