= Robert Reiner (scholar) =

British criminologist

Robert Reiner is a British sociologist who has played a large role in making police studies a distinct field. Currently he is Emeritus Professor of Criminology at London School of Economics Law School. He was Reader in Criminology at Bristol University and at Brunel University, President of the British Society of Criminology from 1993-6 and Director of the LSE Mannheim Centre for Criminology and Criminal Justice 1995-8.

He was born in Hungary in 1946. His refugee parents brought him to England when he was two. In 1967 he graduated from the University of Cambridge with a degree in Economics where he was taught, among others, by Ralph Miliband. He completed MSc in Sociology from London School of Economics in 1969.

His book The Politics of the Police had a formative influence on the growth of police studies in UK and has been described as "the finest, most authoritative and comprehensive account of British policing in the post-war period and remains the standard work in the field."

He was a co-editor of The Oxford Handbook of Criminology.

== Selected works ==
His other works include

- The Blue-Coated Worker (Cambridge University Press 1978)
- Chief Constables (Oxford University Press 1991)
- Law and Order: An Honest Citizen's Guide to Crime and Control (Polity Press 2007)
- Beyond Law and Order (Macmillan 1991) (with M.Cross) (editor)
- Accountable Policing (Institute for Public Policy Research 1993) (with S.Spencer) (editor)
- Policing (Aldershot: Dartmouth 1996) (with M.Maguire and R.Morgan) (editor)
- Policing, Popular Culture and Political Economy : Towards a Social Democratic Criminology (Ashgate 2011)
- Crime: The Mystery of the Common-Sense Concept (Polity 2016)
- Social Democratic Criminology (Routledge 2021)
