= Philip Bean =

British criminologist (born 1936)

Philip Thomas Bean (born 24 September 1936) is Emeritus professor of Criminology at Loughborough University, former President of the British Society of Criminology (1996–99) and an authority and author on the impact on society of drugs, mental illness and crime having published 62 works that are held in approximately 6,000 libraries around the world.

== Early years ==
Bean was born on 24 September 1936, the son of Thomas and Amy Bean. He was educated at Bedford Modern School, the University of London (BSc (Soc), MSc (Econ)) and the University of Nottingham (PhD).

== Career ==
Bean was a Lecturer and Senior Lecturer in Social Sciences at the University of Nottingham (1972–90) and later professor of Criminology at the University of Loughborough (1990–2003) before retiring Emeritus. In addition to his main roles at Nottingham and Loughborough Universities, Bean has been a visiting professor at American, Canadian and Australian universities and between 1996 and 1999 was President of the British Society of Criminology.

In addition to his university posts, Bean has conducted research for the United Nations, the European Commission and, in the United Kingdom, Mencap and the Home Office. Between 2000 and 2005, Bean was an Associate of the General Medical Council dealing with doctors whose conduct had been questioned. He was the Chairman of the Romney Street Group from 2017 to 2019. He has also advised the Metropolitan Police and the Police Department of Oman.

== Selected bibliography ==
- Legalising Drugs: Debates and dilemmas. Published by the Policy Press, University of Bristol, 2010
- Drug treatment : what works?. Published London; New York : Routledge, 2004
- Drugs and Crime. Published Devon, UK; Portland, Or. : Willan, 2002
- Mental Disorder and Community Safety. Published by Palgrave Macmillan, 2001
- Lost children of the Empire. Published London : Unwin Hyman, 1989
- Mental disorder and legal control. Published Cambridge; New York : Cambridge University Press, 1986
- In defence of welfare. Published London; New York : Tavistock Publications, 1985
- Adoption : essays in social policy, law, and sociology. Published London; New York : Tavistock, 1984
- Mental illness: changes and trends. Published Chichester [Sussex]; New York : Wiley, 1983
- Punishment, a philosophical and criminological enquiry. Published Oxford : M. Robertson, 1981
- Rehabilitation and Deviance. Published London; Boston : Routledge & K. Paul, 1976
- The social control of drugs. Published New York, Wiley, 1974
