= Margaret Yates =

Margaret Fulton Yates (born 1904) was a Scottish civil servant, teacher and socialist activist.

Yates was educated at the Royal Holloway College, from which she ultimately obtained a PhD for her research into the origins of party politics. She entered the civil service in 1927, serving as secretary to the British Minister in Cuba. In 1931, she instead became a lecturer at the Teachers Training College, where, for the first time, she became politically active.

Yates joined the Fabian Society, serving on its executive, and became active in the 1936 Fabian Group. She lectured widely, particularly for the League of Nations Union and Historical Association, and at Goldsmiths College. She became a schoolteacher in London, and ultimately a headteacher, moving in later years to lead Alnwick Castle School.
