= Maureen Cain =

British criminologist

Maureen Cain (born 1938) is a British criminologist and professor.

== Received ==
She received her bachelor's degree from London School of Economics in 1959, and she attained her PhD from the London School of Economics in 1969. After graduating from LSE, Cain became a professor.

== Career ==
Cain's three main teaching posts have been:

- A professor and reader at Brunel University (1968–1979).
- The Chair of Sociology at The University of the West Indies (1987–1995).
- A Reader at the Law School at University of Birmingham (1995–2005 approximately) – where she still continues to supervise graduate students.

She has taught courses in Sociology of Law and Crime and Sociology of Law.

She was president of the British Society of Criminology from 2003 to 2006.

== Description of research interests ==
Cain's interests range from Marx and Engels "Sociology of Law" to the role of policemen in society. While teaching at the University of the West Indies in Trinidad she became interested in feminist criminology. After studying Marx's and Engels' sociology of law, she wrote "Racism, the police, and community policing: a comment on the Scarman Report”. Cain then wrote “Orientalism, Occidentalism and the sociology of Crime” and “Globality, Crime and Criminology.”

== Contributions to feminist criminology ==
Maureen Cain’s early work included the article “Society and the Policeman’s Role”, which has been cited in discussions of feminist criminology. The article has been described by some scholars as ahead of its time in relation to feminist theory.Cain has also written on gender and criminology in later works, including Transgressions in Criminology, where she examines historical differences in the treatment of men and women within the criminal justice system.

== Published works ==
- Cain, M. (1973). Society and the Policeman's Role. London: Routledge and Keegan.
- Cain, M. & Hunt, A. (1979). Marx and Engels on Law. London, England: Academic Press.
- Cain, M. (1983). The International State. London: Academic Press.
- Cain, M. (1989). Growing up Good: Policing the behaviour of girls in Europe. London, England: Sage Publications.
- Cain, M. (1990). Towards Transgression: New Directions in Feminist Criminology. International Journal of Sociology of Laws, 252–273.
- Cain, M. (1993). Lawyers Works: Translation and Transgressions. London, England: Open University Press.
- Cain, M. (2000). Orientalism, Occidentialism and the Sociology of Crime. British Journal of Sociology, 239–260.
- Cain, M., & Wahidin, A. (July 2006). Ageing, Crime and Society. Devon, UK: Willian Publishing.
- Cain, M., & Howe, A. (November 2008). Women, Crime and Social Harm: Towards a Criminology for the Global Age. Oxford, England: Oxford Publishing.
- Cain, M. (31 July 2010). Globality, Crime and Criminology. London, England: Sage Publishing.
