= Pardis Mahdavi =

American scholar and university administrator

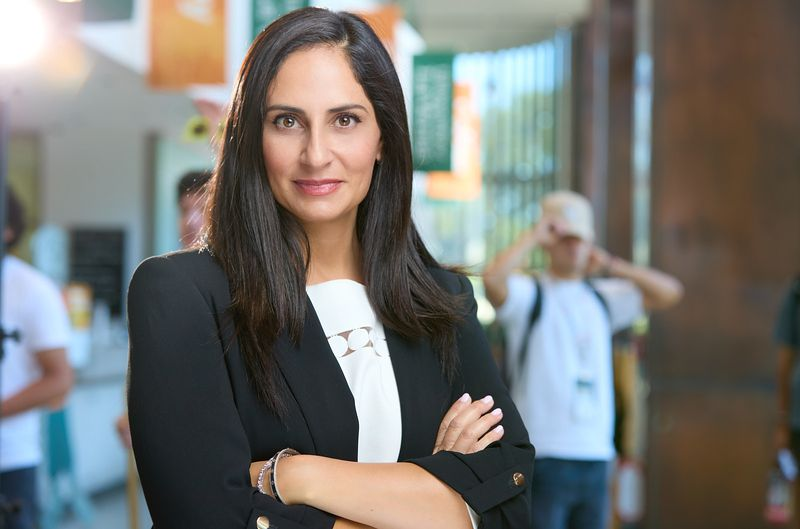
- Mahdavi
- Born: United States
- Education: Occidental College (BA); Columbia University (MIA, MA, PhD)
- Occupations: Scholar, Author, University Administrator
- Employer(s): MyUni (Founder); Lumina Foundation (Board Member)
- Known for: Research on migration, gender, sexuality, human rights
- Awards: Council on Foreign Relations (Lifetime Member), Wig Distinguished Teaching Award

Pardis Mahdavi is an American scholar, author, and university administrator. She is the Executive Director of the Executive Leadership Academy at the University of California, Berkeley, and serves on the Board of Directors for the Lumina Foundation. Mahdavi previously served as the Provost and Executive Vice President at the University of Montana, the Dean of Social Sciences at Arizona State University, and the Acting Dean of the Josef Korbel School of International Studies at the University of Denver. From 2006 to 2017, she held academic and administrative roles at Pomona College, including Professor and Chair of Anthropology, Director of the Pacific Basin Institute, and Dean of Women. In August 2023, Mahdavi became President of the University of La Verne, serving until June 2024.

== Education ==
Mahdavi earned a Bachelor of Arts in Diplomacy and World Affairs from Occidental College. She subsequently received a Master of International Affairs (M.I.A.) and a Master of Arts in Anthropology from Columbia University, where she also completed a Ph.D. in Sociomedical Sciences and Anthropology.

== Career ==
From 2006 to 2017, Mahdavi taught at Pomona College, serving as Professor and Chair of Anthropology, Director of the Pacific Basin Institute, and Dean of Women. In 2017, she was appointed Acting Dean of the Josef Korbel School of International Studies at the University of Denver.

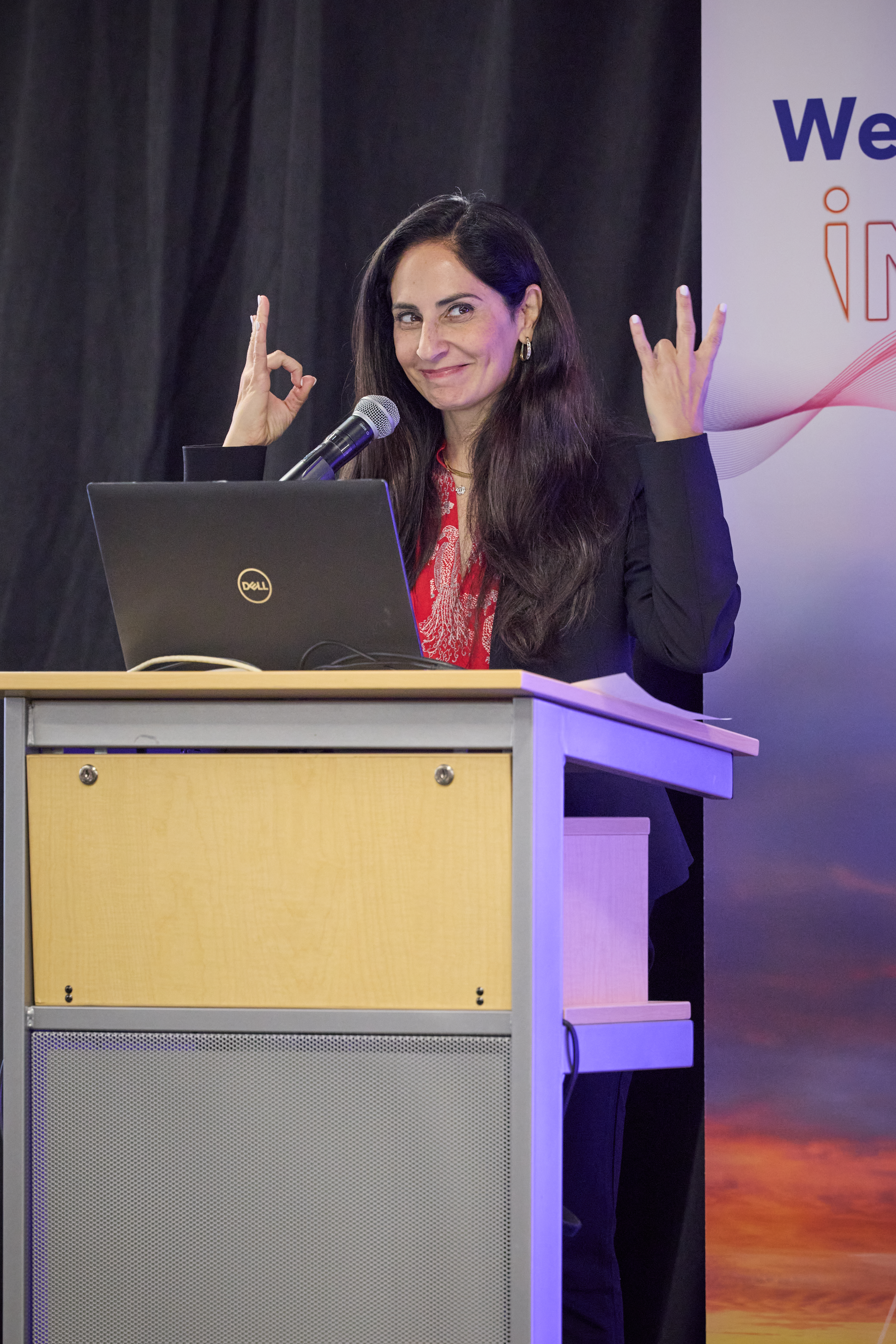
Pardis Madavi, Speaker

In 2019, she was named Dean of Social Sciences at Arizona State University, overseeing interdisciplinary social science programs. She later served as Provost and Executive Vice President at the University of Montana beginning in 2022. In August 2023, she became the 19th President of the University of La Verne, a role she held until June 2024. In 2024, Mahdavi was appointed to the Board of Directors of the Lumina Foundation.

She has also served in public service, including an appointment to the Colorado Commission on Higher Education by Governor John Hickenlooper, with reappointment under Governor Jared Polis.

== Research ==
Mahdavi’s research focuses on labor, migration, gender, sexuality, human rights, youth culture, transnational feminism, and public health, particularly within Middle Eastern contexts. She has contributed to academic journals and public media outlets on issues surrounding identity, migration, and human rights.

== Publications ==
=== Selected books ===
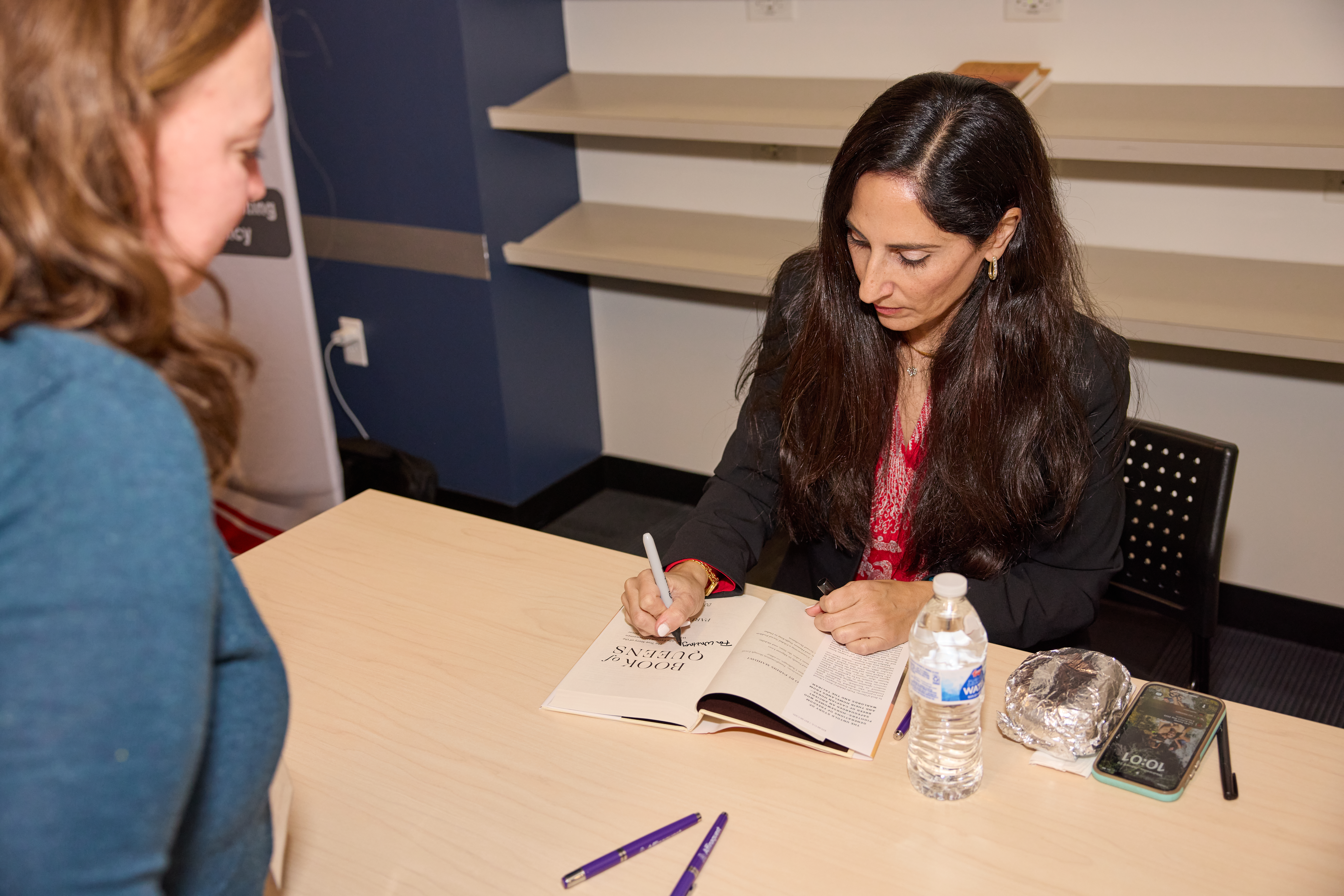
Pardis Mahdavi, Author

- Mahdavi, Pardis. Passionate Uprisings: Iran’s Sexual Revolution. Stanford University Press, 2008. ISBN 978-0804758568.
- Mahdavi, Pardis. Gridlock: Labor, Migration and Human Trafficking in Dubai. Stanford University Press, 2011. ISBN 978-0804772199.
- Mahdavi, Pardis. From Trafficking to Terror: Constructing a Global Social Problem. Routledge, 2013. ISBN 978-0415820724.
- Mahdavi, Pardis. Crossing the Gulf: Love and Family in Migrants’ Lives. Stanford University Press, 2016. ISBN 978-0804798267.
- Mahdavi, Pardis. Hyphen. Bloomsbury Academic, 2021. ISBN 978-1-5013-7391-6.
- Mahdavi, Pardis. Book of Queens: The True Story of the Middle Eastern Horsewomen Who Fought the War on Terror. Hachette Books, 2023. ISBN 978-0306830333.

=== Selected articles ===
- "Contractual Sterilization: Migrant Mothers and the Politics of Carceral Politics in the GCC Countries." Journal of Contemporary Ethnography, vol. 50, no. 3, 2020.
- "Love, Labor and the Law: Regulating Migrant Women’s Sexualities in the Gulf." Anthropology of the Middle East, Spring 2015.
- "Race, Space, Place: Notes on the Racialization and Spatialization of Commercial Sex Work in Dubai." Culture, Health & Sexuality, vol. 12, no. 8, 2010.
- "The Traffic of Persians: Questioning the Narrative of 'Trafficked' Iranian Women in Dubai." Comparative Studies of South Asia, Africa and the Middle East, vol. 30, no. 3, 2010.
- "Trafficked Voices: Questioning the Gendered and Raced Construction of Trafficking in the Middle East." Journal of Middle East Women’s Studies, vol. 7, no. 3, 2011.
- "How #MeToo Became a Global Movement." Foreign Affairs, March 6, 2018.
- "Desantis’ Defunding of Diversity Programs Threatens College Life as We Know It." Los Angeles Times, May 19, 2023.
- "The Snowflake Revolution." The Denver Post, April 27, 2018.
- "Stateless and for Sale in the Gulf." Foreign Affairs, June 30, 2016.
- "Iran’s Literary Sexual Revolution." Times Literary Supplement, April 2017.

== Honors and awards ==
- Lifetime Member, Council on Foreign Relations (2022)
- Arizona’s Most Intriguing Women of the Decade (2022)
- Justice and Society Fellow, Aspen Institute (2018)
- Abe Fellowship, Social Science Research Council (2014–2015)
- Google Ideas Fellow (2012)
- Wig Distinguished Teaching Award, Pomona College (2012)
- Woodrow Wilson Center Fellowship (2009–2010)
- American Council of Learned Societies Fellowship (2010)
- Asia Society Fellowship (2009)

== See also ==
- List of American print journalists
- Middle Eastern Studies
- Tehran Times
- Huffington Post
- Human rights in Iran
- Crime in the United Arab Emirates
