= British Society of Criminology =

British professional organization

British Society of Criminology (BSC) is a British organization aiming to further the interests and knowledge of both scholars and practitioners involved in any aspect of professional activity, teaching, research or public education related to crime, criminal behaviour and criminal justice systems in the United Kingdom and abroad. BSC is dedicated to promoting criminology and criminological research. Its official, peer-reviewed, scholarly journal is called Criminology and Criminal Justice (CCJ) and is published through SAGE Publications.

BSC has reciprocal agreements with a number of organisations, which include the following:

- British Sociological Association
- Australian and New Zealand Society of Criminology
- Social Policy Association
- Academy of Criminal Justice Sciences.

For members, this means they can attend the other organisations' events at reduced member rate, and vice versa.

== List of presidents ==
The following have served as President of the British Society of Criminology:

- 1986 to 1989: Roger Hood
- 1990 to 1993: David Farrington
- 1993 to 1996: Robert Reiner
- 1996 to 1999: Philip Bean
- 2000 to 2003: Keith Bottomley
- 2003 to 2005: Maureen Cain
- 2005 to 2008: Tim Newburn
- 2008 to 2011: Mike Hough
- 2011 to 2015: Loraine Gelsthorpe
- 2015 to 2019: Peter Squires
- 2019 to present: Sandra Walklate

== British Society of Criminology Annual Conference ==
- 2025, 1-4 July, University of Portsmouth
- 2018, 3-6 July, Birmingham City University
- 2017, 4-7 July, Sheffield Hallam University
- 2016, 6-8 July, Nottingham
- 2015, 30 June- 3 July, Plymouth University
- 2014, 9-12 July, University of Liverpool
- 2013, 2-4 July, University of Wolverhampton
- 2012, 4–6 July, University of Portsmouth
- 2011, 3–6 July, Northumbria University
- 2010, 11–14 July, Leicester University
- 2009, 29 June - 1 July, Cardiff University and University of Glamorgan
- 2008, University of Huddersfield
- 2007, London School of Economics
- 2006, Glasgow
- 2005, University of Leeds
- 2004, University of Portsmouth
- 2003, Bangor University
- 2002, Keele University
- 2000, Leicester University
- 1999, University of Liverpool
- 1997, Queen's University Belfast
- 1995, Loughborough University
- 1993, Cardiff University
- 1991, University of York
- 1989, Bristol Polytechnic
- 1987, University of Sheffield

== Outstanding Achievement Award ==
Winners:

- 2009: Stanley Cohen
- 2010: Pat Carlen
- 2011: Robert Reiner
- 2012: Jock Young
- 2013: Joanna Shapland
- 2014: Sandra Walklate
- 2015: John Lea
- 2016: Dick Hobbs
- 2017: John Braithwaite
- 2018: Frances Heidensohn
