= Occupational Medicine (Hanley & Belfus journal) =

- Discipline: Medicine
- Language: English

Publication details
- Former name: State of the Art Reviews in Occupational Medicine
- History: 1986–2002
- Publisher: Hanley & Belfus (United States)
- Frequency: Quarterly

Standard abbreviations
- ISO 4: Occup. Med.
- NLM: Occup Med

Indexing
- CODEN: SAOME4
- ISSN: 0885-114X
- OCLC no.: 12566522

Occupational Medicine is a defunct peer-reviewed scientific journal of medicine. It was published from 1986 to 2002 by Hanley & Belfus. The journal was then absorbed by Clinics in Occupational and Environmental Medicine.

== Indexing and abstracting ==
During its publication, Occupational Medicine was indexed and abstracted in the following bibliographic databases:

- Index medicus
- MEDLINE
- PubMed
