= Willem van Genugten =

Professor of human rights

Willem J.M. van Genugten (born 30 September 1950, Sint-Oedenrode) is Professor em. of Human Rights at Radboud University Nijmegen and of International Law at Tilburg University. From 2000 to 2015, he was a visiting professor at the University of Minnesota, USA. Since 2008, he has been Extraordinary Professor of International Law at the North-West University, South Africa. He has published extensively on a variety of issues in international law.

He studied law (graduation in 1977, with distinction) and philosophy (graduation in 1985, cum laude) at the Radboud University Nijmegen. His first job was Head of the Studium Generale Office, Nijmegen University (1977-1985), followed by the position of Lecturer in Theory of Law at Tilburg University. In 1988, he defended his Ph.D. thesis at the Radboud University. In the past he has been Dean of the Law School of Tilburg University (2002-2004 and 2010–2011) and Dean of The Hague Institute for Global Justice (2011-2012). In September 2012, he received a doctorate honoris causa from North-West University.

In addition to his university positions, he held the position of chair of the standing Commission on Human Rights of the Dutch government and of vice-chair of the Dutch Advisory Council on International Affairs, of which the commission is a part; of Editor-in-chief of the Netherlands Yearbook of International Law; and of Chair of the Dutch Foundation for the Advancement of Tropical Research, Science for Global Development (part of the Netherlands Organisation for Scientific Research). He has also served as Chair of the Committee on the Implementation of the Rights of Indigenous Peoples of the International Law Association, and Chair of the Royal Netherlands Society of International Law.

Van Genugten is married and father of three children (1986, 1987, 1991).
