= Darrin Baines =

British health economist

- Darrin Baines in 2026
- Born: Darrin Lloyd Baines; 1967 (age 58–59); United Kingdom
- Occupations: Health economist; academic
- Known for: Health economics, NHS productivity, pharmacy practice
- Website: darrinbaines.org

Darrin Lloyd Baines is a British health economist and academic whose work focuses on health economics, health systems, and pharmacy practice. His research includes topics such as prescribing policy, pharmacoeconomics, and evaluation of health services.

Baines has held professorial appointments in the United Kingdom, including at Coventry University.

He has participated in UK–China and UK–Egypt partnerships supported by universities and the British Council, including collaborative programmes involving Cairo University.

Baines has also worked with David Prior, Baron Prior of Brampton, the former chairman of NHS England.

== Education ==
Baines received an MSc in Health Economics from the University of York in 1993 and a PhD in health economics from the University of Nottingham in 1996, where his doctoral research examined drivers of prescribing behaviour in general practice.

He later undertook postgraduate study in health care ethics at the University of Birmingham.

== Career ==
Baines has held various professorial appointments in health economics, including as Professor of Health Economics at Coventry University from 2014 to 2017, and as Professor of Health Economics at Bournemouth University from 2017 to 2021.

He has also served as a visiting professor at the University of Lincoln. In 2014, he was appointed Professor of Health Economics at Coventry University, following service as Associate Professor in Health Economics at the University of Nottingham.

From 2023 to 2024, Baines was Head of Health Economics at Clarivate, where he worked on applications of artificial intelligence and data science in health-technology assessment.

His areas of work include economic evaluation, modelling, and the reform of health systems, with a particular interest in technology-enabled pharmacy. He has also worked in consultancy and within the National Health Service (NHS) in economist and advisory roles, including engagement with UK health-policy institutions such as the Office of Health Economics.

== International collaborations ==
Baines has led international knowledge-exchange networks in health economics in both Egypt and China. He helped develop a UK–Egypt pharmacoeconomics partnership, supported in part through the British Council. He has also been involved in the UK–China Health and Economy Partnership.

== Research ==
Baines has published various articles on NHS productivity, health service organisation, and related topics. He has also written on misinformation during the COVID-19 pandemic and the Brexit political campaign.

In his early research, Baines examined GP fundholding, including analyses of selection bias, and the development and application of prescribing-cost metrics such as ASTRO-PU and ASTRO(97)-PU.

Baines has contributed to pharmacoeconomic research in the Middle East and North Africa region, including the EQ-5D-5L valuation study in Egypt. He has also published on economic modelling and costing work related to the Namaste Care dementia programme, as well as an evaluation of the East Sussex Wellbeing & Employment Service.

== Selected publications ==
- Baines, Darrin L.; Whynes, David K. (1996). "Selection bias in GP fundholding". Health Economics. 5 (2): 129–140. doi:10.1002/(SICI)1099-1050(199603)5:2<129::AID-HEC190>3.0.CO;2-R. PMID 8733105.
- Baines, Darrin; Tolley, Keith; Whynes, David (1997). Prescribing, Budgets and Fundholding in General Practice. OHE Series on Health. London: Office of Health Economics.
- Whynes, David K.; Baines, Darrin L.; Tolley, Keith H. (1996). "Explaining variations in general practice prescribing costs per ASTRO-PU (age, sex, and temporary resident originated prescribing unit)". BMJ. 312 (7029): 488–489. doi:10.1136/bmj.312.7029.488. PMC 2349938. PMID 8597684.
- Baines, Darrin; Whynes, David (1998). "The use of the ASTRO-PU and the ASTRO(97)-PU in the setting of prescribing budgets in English general practice". Journal of Clinical Pharmacy and Therapeutics. 23 (3): 229–234. doi:10.1046/j.1365-2710.1998.00157.x. PMID 9831975.
- Baines, Darrin (2008). "Has pharmacy run out of time?". Pharmaceutical Journal. 281 (7509): 21–23.
- Baines, Darrin L.; Bates, Imogen; Bader, Lynne; Hale, Charlotte; Schneider, Paul (2018). "Conceptualising production, productivity and technology in pharmacy practice: a framework for policy, education and research". Human Resources for Health. 16 (1): 51. doi:10.1186/s12960-018-0317-5. PMC 6171192. PMID 30285766.
- Baines, Darrin; Nørgaard, Lotte Stig; Babar, Zaheer-Ud-Din; Rossing, Charlotte (2020). "The Fourth Industrial Revolution: Will it change pharmacy practice?". Research in Social and Administrative Pharmacy. 16 (9): 1279–1281. doi:10.1016/j.sapharm.2019.04.003. PMID 31010746.
- Al Shabasy, Sahar; Abbassi, Maggie; Finch, Aureliano; Roudijk, Bram; Baines, Darrin; Farid, Samar (2022). "The EQ-5D-5L valuation study in Egypt". PharmacoEconomics. 40 (4): 433–447. doi:10.1007/s40273-021-01100-y. PMC 8595057. PMID 34786590.

== Personal life ==
Baines resided in Leominster, Herefordshire, where he assembled the largest private collection of antique apothecary and pharmacy artefacts in the United Kingdom.

In 2025, his complete Victorian pharmacist's shop collection was consigned to auction.
