= Drowne =

Drowne and popular variant Drown are surnames which originated in Yorkshire, England. Many branches of this family dropped the E during the late 18th century as a part of the American Spelling Reform movement, forming the surname Drown. It is possibly derived from the Middle English word "drane", or drone, the male honey bee.

The first Drowne/Drown in North America was Leonard Drowne (1646–1729) who came from Penryn, Cornwall to what was then part of Kittery in Massachusetts soon after the Restoration (England) of the monarchy in 1660. Leonard, a ship-wright, established a shipyard near Sturgeon Creek in what is now Eliot, York County, Maine. Leonard married Elizabeth Abbott of Portsmouth, New Hampshire around 1675. Leonard helped organize and build the first Baptist Church in Maine in 1682. During King William's War, many Maine towns were raided and English settlements were massacred by the Wabanaki people in conjunction with the French. In 1696, 28 members of the Baptist Church moved to Charleston, South Carolina and established the first Baptist church there while the Drownes moved to Boston, Massachusetts in 1699, due to the ongoing war and violence. After Elizabeth Abbott died, Leonard married his also-widowed sister-in law, Mary (Abbott) Caley. This marriage was performed by the Rev. Cotton Mather in Boston, November 4, 1707. Leonard Drowne died in Boston, October 31, 1729. Leonard Drowne and other early members of the family are buried in Copp's Hill Cemetery in Boston.

- Shem Drowne, colonial American weather vane maker, son of Leonard Drowne
- Solomon Drowne, American Revolutionary War surgeon, grandson of Leonard Drowne
- Henry Thayer Drowne, President of National Fire Insurance Company of New York, grandson of Solomon and President of the New York Genealogical and Biographical Society
- Henry Russell Drowne, son of Henry Thayer Drowne, New York businessman of Lawrie, Mann & Drowne, an officer of Sons of the Revolution in New York State, American Numismatic Society, Society of the Cincinnati, New-York Historical Society, New York Genealogical and Biographical Society, and author of books on genealogy and Fraunces Tavern.
- Frederick Drowne, an officer in the American Revolution and Representative to the General Court of Massachusetts from Rohobeth, Massachusetts from 1787-1781 and 1799–1804 and delegate of the Massachusetts Ratifying Convention of the U.S. Constitution in 1788
- Samuel Drowne, American Revolutionary War soldier and colonial silversmith from Portsmouth, New Hampshire

== See also ==
- Drown (surname)
- Drown (disambiguation)
- Mosses from an Old Manse Nathaniel Hawthorne's collection of short stories which includes one entitled "Drowne's Wooden Image", based roughly on Deacon Shem Drowne
