= Drowning Man =

Drowning Man may refer to:

- "Drowning Man" (Duran Duran song)
- "Drowning Man", a song by U2 from the 1983 album, War
- "Drowning Man", a song by Eric Church from the 2018 album, Desperate Man
- "The Drowning Man", a song by the Cure from the 1981 album, Faith
- Drowningman, an American metalcore/hardcore band

== See also ==
- The Drowning Men, an American indie rock band
- The Drowned Man, an original theatre production by British theatre company Punchdrunk
- A Czech variant of the snack wurstsalat, known as "the drowning man".
- Drowning (disambiguation)
