= Drown (surname) =

Drown is a surname which originated in Yorkshire, England. It is the Americanization of the Surname Drowne. Many branches of this family dropped the E during the late 18th century as a part of the American Spelling Reform movement, forming the surname Drown. It is possibly derived from the Middle English word "drane", or drone, the male honey bee.

The first Drowne/Drown in North America was Leonard Drowne (1646–1729) who came from Penryn, Cornwall to what was then part of Kittery in Massachusetts soon after the Restoration (England) of the monarchy in 1660. Leonard, a ship-wright, established a shipyard near Sturgeon Creek in what is now Eliot, York County, Maine. Leonard married Sarah Abbott of Portsmouth, New Hampshire around 1675. Leonard helped organize and build the first Baptist Church in Maine in 1682. During King William's War, many Maine towns were raided and English settlements were massacred by the Wabanaki people in conjunction with the French. In 1696, 28 members of the Baptist Church moved to Charleston, South Carolina and established the first Baptist church there while the Drownes moved to Boston, Massachusetts in 1699, due to the ongoing war and violence. After Sarah Abbott died, Leonard married his also-widowed sister-in law, Mary (Abbott) Caley. This marriage was performed by the Rev. Cotton Mather in Boston, November 4, 1707. Leonard Drowne died in Boston, October 31, 1729. Leonard Drowne and other early members of the family are buried in Copp's Hill Cemetery in Boston.

== Notable people with the surname Drown ==
- Julia Kate Drown (born 1962), Labour member of British Parliament for Swindon South from 1997 until 2005
- Thomas Messinger Drown, (1842–1904), scientist and fourth President of Lehigh University in Bethlehem, Pennsylvania, son of William Appleton Drown Sr.
- William Appleton Drown, Sr, (1809-1879), President of William A. Drown & Co of Philadelphia, one of the world's largest manufactures of umbrellas in the 19th-century
- Joseph Drown, (1906-1982), hotelier, creator of the Hotel Bel-Air, the Joseph Drown Foundation, former owner of the Desert Inn and the U.S. Grant Hotel, began his career with Conrad Hilton
- Ezra Drown, lawyer, brigadier-general of the Iowa militia, then Los Angeles County District Attorney 1857-1859; 1861-1863
- Frank Drown (born 1920), American Christian missionary to Ecuador and author

== Notable people with the surname Drowne ==
- Shem Drowne, colonial American weather vane maker, son of Leonard Drowne
- Dr. Solomon Drowne, American Revolutionary War surgeon, grandson of Leonard Drowne
- Henry Thayer Drowne (1822-1897), President of National Fire Insurance Company of New York, grandson of Solomon
- Rev. Dr. Thomas Stafford Drowne (1823-1897) Episcopalian clergy, Assistant Minister of St. Ann's and the Holy Trinity Church in Brooklyn from 1848-1858, Rector of St. Paul's Episcopal Church (Brooklyn) from 1858-1875, secretary of the Episcopal Diocese of Long Island from 1868-1897, instructor and secretary of the General Theological Seminary in New York from 1886-1897, author of books on theology and architecture
- Henry Russell Drowne (1860-1934), wool merchant, author of books on Fraunces Tavern and early American history, governor of the American Numismatic Society from 1911-1934, son of Henry Thayer Drowne, Great-grandson of Dr. Solomon Drowne
- Frederick Drowne, an officer in the American Revolution and Representative to the General Court of Massachusetts from Rohobeth, Massachusetts from 1787-1781 and 1799–1804 and delegate of the Massachusetts Ratifying Convention of the U.S. Constitution in 1788, voting against ratification. Later used the spelling Drown.
- Samuel Drowne, American Revolutionary War soldier and colonial silversmith from Portsmouth, New Hampshire. Later used the spelling Drown.

== See also ==
- Drowne, surname
- Drown (disambiguation)

== Further information ==
- The Drown Name in History by Ancestry.com
