= Thomas Hickey (soldier) =

Irish-born soldier

- Born: Ireland
- Died: June 28, 1776; Bowery, New York City
- Military career
- Allegiance: Great Britain (pre–1765); United Colonies (1775–1776)
- Branch: British Army; Continental Army
- Unit: Commander-in-Chief's Guard
- Conflicts: French and Indian War; American Revolutionary War

Thomas Hickey (died June 28, 1776) was an Irish-born soldier who served in the French and Indian War and American Revolutionary War, and was the first Continental Army soldier to be executed for "mutiny, sedition, and treachery". Born in Ireland, Thomas Hickey came to America as a British Army soldier and fought as a combat field servant to Major-general William Johnson in the French and Indian War. He later joined the Continental army when the Revolutionary War broke out, and became part of the Commander-in-Chief's Guard, which protected General George Washington, his staff, and the Continental Army's payroll. Hickey was briefly jailed for passing counterfeit money; during this incarceration, he told another prisoner he was part of a conspiracy. He was later tried and executed for mutiny and sedition against the Continental Army. Plausible, but unverified, reports suggest that he may have been involved in an assassination plot against Washington in 1776.

Washington made a general announcement after his death:

The unhappy fate of Thomas Hickey, executed this day for mutiny, sedition, and treachery, the General hopes will be a warning to every soldier in the Army to avoid those crimes, and all others, so disgraceful to the character of a soldier, and pernicious to his country, whose pay he receives and bread he eats. And in order to avoid those crimes, the most certain method is to keep out of the temptation of them, and particularly to avoid lewd women, who, by the dying confession of this poor criminal, first led him into practices which ended in an untimely and ignominious death.

== Conspiracy ==
In April 1776, after the conclusion of the Boston campaign, General George Washington and the Continental Army marched to New York City and prepared for an anticipated assault on the city by the British Army. The governor of New York, William Tryon, had been driven out of the city by American forces and was compelled to seek refuge on a ship in New York Harbor. Nevertheless, the city had many Loyalist residents who favored the British side.

Thomas Hickey was a private in the Commander-in-Chief's Guard, a unit formed on March 12, 1776, to protect Washington, his staff, and the Continental Army's cash. That spring, Hickey and another soldier were arrested for passing counterfeit money. While incarcerated in Bridewell prison, Hickey revealed to another prisoner, Isaac Ketchum, (possibly overheard by two others, Isaac and Israel Youngs) that he was part of a wider conspiracy of soldiers who were prepared to defect to the British once the expected invasion came.

Arrested by civilian authorities, Hickey was turned over to the Continental Army for trial. He was court-martialed and found guilty of mutiny and sedition. He was hanged on June 28, 1776, at the corner of Chrystie and Grand Streets before a crowd of 20,000 spectators in New York. Hickey was the only person put on trial for the conspiracy. During the trial, David Mathews, the Mayor of New York City and a Loyalist, was accused of funding the operation to bribe soldiers to join the British. Although the charge was never proven, Mathews and 12 others were briefly imprisoned. The initial plan was alleged to include plans to kidnap Washington, assassinate his officers, and blow up the Continental Army's ammunition magazines. These rumors greatly damaged the reputation of Loyalists throughout the nascent United States.

=== Military rank ===
In the transcript of Court Martial for the Trial of Thomas Hickey and Others on June 26, 1776, Hickey is referred to as a "private sentinel" in Washington's Life Guards, under the command of "Maj. Gibbs". There is reason to suspect this transcript is a copy made shortly after the end of the Revolutionary War when many official papers were being copied for preservation. In Harry Ward's George Washington's Enforcers (2006), he gives Hickey's rank as sergeant, and notes that Captain Caleb Gibbs was not promoted to major until June 29, 1778, two years after Hickey's trial. When enlisted soldiers are convicted, it is normal for their punishment to include a reduction to the lowest rank, private. A postwar transcript would explain why Hickey is listed at his lowest rank and Gibbs is identified at his highest rank.

== Assassination plot ==
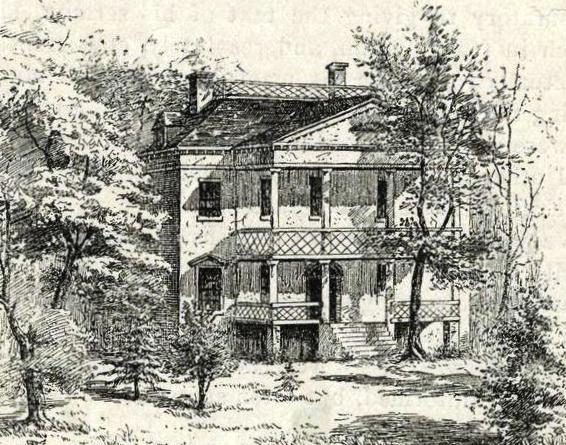
Richmond Hill (built c. 1760, demolished 1849)

Washington's headquarters from May to June 1776 was at Richmond Hill, a suburban villa outside the city. Samuel Fraunces, a tavern keeper whose establishment was about two miles away, provided meals for the general and his officers. Washington hired a housekeeper, a 72-year-old widow named Elizabeth Thompson, who worked at Richmond Hill from June 1776 to December 1781.

Although Hickey was jailed for passing counterfeit money, and then charged with sedition and conspiracy while in prison, William Spohn Baker, a late 19th-century Washingtonian, believed that the real reason for his execution was involvement in a plot to kill or kidnap Washington:

Thomas Hickey, one of Washington's Guard, was tried by a court-martial and sentenced to death, being found implicated in a plot to murder the American general officers on the arrival of the British, or at best to capture Washington and deliver him to Sir William Howe. The plot had been traced to Governor Tryon, the mayor having been a principal agent between him and the persons concerned in it.

Baker was wrong about the specific crimes of which Hickey was convicted, but in 1776 there was a real rumor of an assassination plot:

[June 24, 1776.] A most infernal plot has lately been discovered here, which, had it been put into execution, would have made America tremble, and been as fatal a stroke to us, this Country, as Gun Powder Treason would to England, had it succeeded. The hellish conspirators were a number of Tories (the Mayor of ye City among them) and three of General Washington's Life Guards. The plan was to kill Generals Washington and Putnam, and as many other Commanding Officers as possible. [July 13, 1776.] I suppose you have heard of ye execution of one of the General's Guards, concerned in ye hellish plot, discovered here some time past. There was a vast concourse of people to see ye poor fellow hanged.

Two other contemporaneous references to an assassination plot have been published. A garbled account of an assassination attempt appeared over two years later in a provincial English newspaper, The Ipswich Journal, on October 31, 1778:

Advise is received from America that two persons, a man and a woman who lived as servants with General Washing ton [sic], have been executed in the presence of the army for conspiring to poison their master.

=== Fraunces' petition to Congress ===
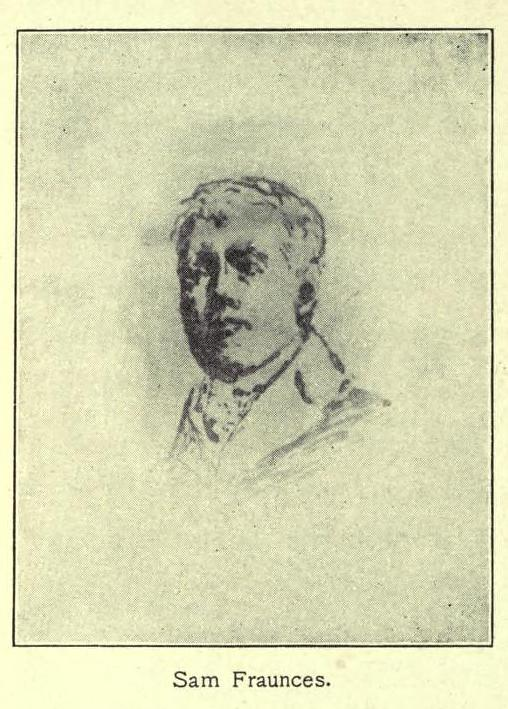
Sam Fraunces, c. 1900 engraving, based on an undated ink sketch attributed to John Trumbull. The ink sketch is privately owned.

In a March 5, 1785, sworn petition to the U.S. Congress, Samuel Fraunces stated that it was he who discovered the assassination plot, that he was falsely accused of being part of it and was jailed until his name was cleared. He wrote (in the third person):

That he [Fraunces] was the Person that first discovered the Conspiracy which was formed in the Year 1776 against the Life of his Excellency General Washington and that the Suspicions Which were Entertained of his agency in that Important Discovery occasioned [sic, occasioned] a public Enquiry after he was made a Prisoner on which the want of positive Proof alone preserved his Life.

Congress' response to Fraunces' petition downplayed the plot but accepted his role as "instrumental in discovering and defeating" it. For debts incurred during the Revolutionary War, Congress awarded him £2000, a later payment covered accumulated interest, and Congress paid $1,625 to lease his tavern for two years to house federal government offices.

== Phoebe Fraunces legend ==
Martha Washington's grandson, George Washington Parke Custis, died in 1857. Two years later, his daughter, Mary Anna Custis Lee, published his memoirs, to which were added extended notes by the antiquarian Benson J. Lossing. One of these notes told the story of an attempt by Hickey to poison Washington:

When Washington and his army occupied the city, in the summer of 1776, the chief resided at Richmond Hill, a little out of town, afterward the seat of Aaron Burr. [Samuel] Fraunces's daughter was Washington's housekeeper, and she saved his life on one occasion, by exposing the intentions of Hickey, one of the Life-Guard (already mentioned), who was about to murder the general, by putting poison in a dish of peas prepared for his table.

Custis' actual memoirs did not contain the story—it was added by Lossing—but this distinction is easy for the reader to miss. Lossing repeated the story in an 1870 book, claiming that Washington's housekeeper had testified at Hickey's court-martial:

The guardsman was tried by a court-martial, and on the testimony of the housekeeper and one of the corps, whom the culprit had unsuccessfully attempted to corrupt, he was found guilty of 'mutiny and sedition and of holding a treacherous correspondence with the enemies of the colonies' and was sentenced to be hanged.[*] [*]These facts were related to a friend of the writer (Mr. W.J. Davis), by the late Peter Embury, of New York, who resided in the city at the time, was well acquainted with the general's housekeeper, and was present at the execution of Hickey.

Lossing's information was third-hand (as he freely admitted). This story is undermined by the trial minutes of Hickey's court-martial, which contain no housekeeper's testimony. In the January 1876 issue of Scribner's Monthly, John F. Mines repeated Lossing's story and identified the housekeeper. This was more than 99 years after Hickey's execution and was the first time that the name "Phoebe Fraunces" appeared in print. Mines listed no sources for the magazine article. It was nationally read in the patriotic build-up to the 1876 Centennial celebration:

A daughter of "Black Sam", Phoebe Fraunces, was Washington's housekeeper when he had his headquarters in New York in the spring of 1776, and was the means of defeating a conspiracy against his life. Its immediate agent was to be Thomas Hickey, a deserter from the British army, who had become a member of Washington's bodyguard, and had made himself a general favorite at headquarters. Fortunately, the would-be conspirator fell desperately in love with Phoebe Fraunces, and made her his confidant. She revealed the plot to her father, and at an opportune moment the denouement came. Hickey was arrested and tried by court-martial.

In 1919, Henry Russell Drowne (great-grandson of Dr. Solomon Drowne, the 1776 chronicler above) repeated the Phoebe Fraunces legend in his history of Fraunces Tavern:

His [Samuel Fraunces's] daughter Phoebe was Washington's housekeeper in the Mortier House on Richmond Hill, occupied by the Commander-in-Chief as Headquarters, in June, 1776, and it was she who revealed the plot to assassinate Generals Washington and Putnam, which led to the apprehension of her lover, an Irishman named Thomas Hickey, a British deserter, then a member of Washington's bodyguard, in consequence of which he was promptly executed on June 28, 1776.

=== Legend refuted ===
There is no record of Samuel Fraunces having had a daughter named Phoebe. The name does not appear with those of his children in the baptismal records of Christ Church, Philadelphia, or Trinity Church, New York. His will, dated September 11, 1795, also does not mention a "Phoebe".

It is well documented that Fraunces' nickname was "Black Sam", but the 1790 U.S. census for New York lists him as a "free white male" and a slaveholder. New York tax records list both slaves and indentured servants in his household, and he advertised the sale of a slave in a New York newspaper. If a "Phoebe" ever existed, she may have been a servant employed or enslaved by Fraunces, rather than his daughter.

Self-published author Charles L. Blockson states that "Phoebe" was the nickname of Fraunces' eldest daughter Elizabeth, but he provides no evidence to support this claim. If the woman in the legend had been Elizabeth Fraunces, she would have been rather young for wartime espionage or a clandestine love affair. Elizabeth's birth date of December 26, 1765, means that at the time of Hickey's execution, she was 10 1/2 years old.

== In popular culture ==
- Hickey is the villain in the 1977 children's book Phoebe the Spy by Judith Berry Griffin.
- Hickey is hanged for trying to kill Washington and mentioned in the 2008 historical novel Chains by Laurie Halse Anderson.
- Hickey appears as an antagonist in the 2012 video game Assassin's Creed III. Though a member of the Templar Order, he joined solely for profit. In the game, he plots to assassinate Washington so that Charles Lee would be promoted to Commander-in-Chief, but is killed by the game's protagonist, Connor. He is voiced by Allen Leech.
- In the AMC television series Turn: Washington's Spies, Hickey appears serving as a life guard to General Washington and part of a plot to assassinate him at the end of Season 2. Hickey is subsequently hanged for his treachery in the premiere episode of Season 3.
- Hickey is detailed as one of the conspirators to assassinate General Washington in the 2019 book The First Conspiracy by Brad Meltzer & Josh Mensch.
- The Hickey plot is one of the storylines in the 1993 historical novel The Kingsbridge Plot by Maan Meyers.
