= Jane Tuers =

American patriot (1745–1834)

Jannetje Van Reypen Tuers
- Born: before April 16, 1745; Bergen Township, New Jersey
- Died: March 26, 1834
- Spouse: Nicholas Arentsen Tuers (m. 1766; died 1815)
- Children: Annatie Toers (1770–1796); Aeltie Toers (1772–1823); Arent Nicholsen Toers (1784–1835)

Jannetje Van Reypen Tuers was a patriot during the American Revolutionary War and had a role in confirming information about a British conspiracy with Benedict Arnold to take over West Point.

== Biography ==
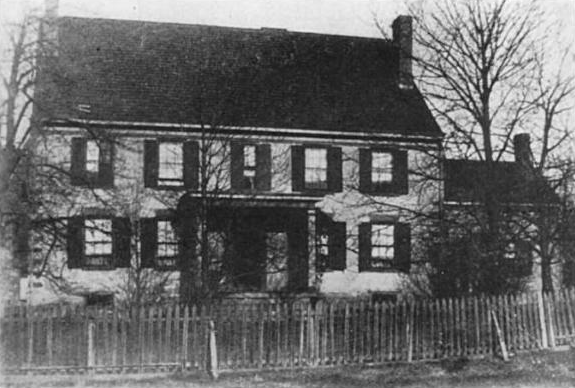
The Tuers House

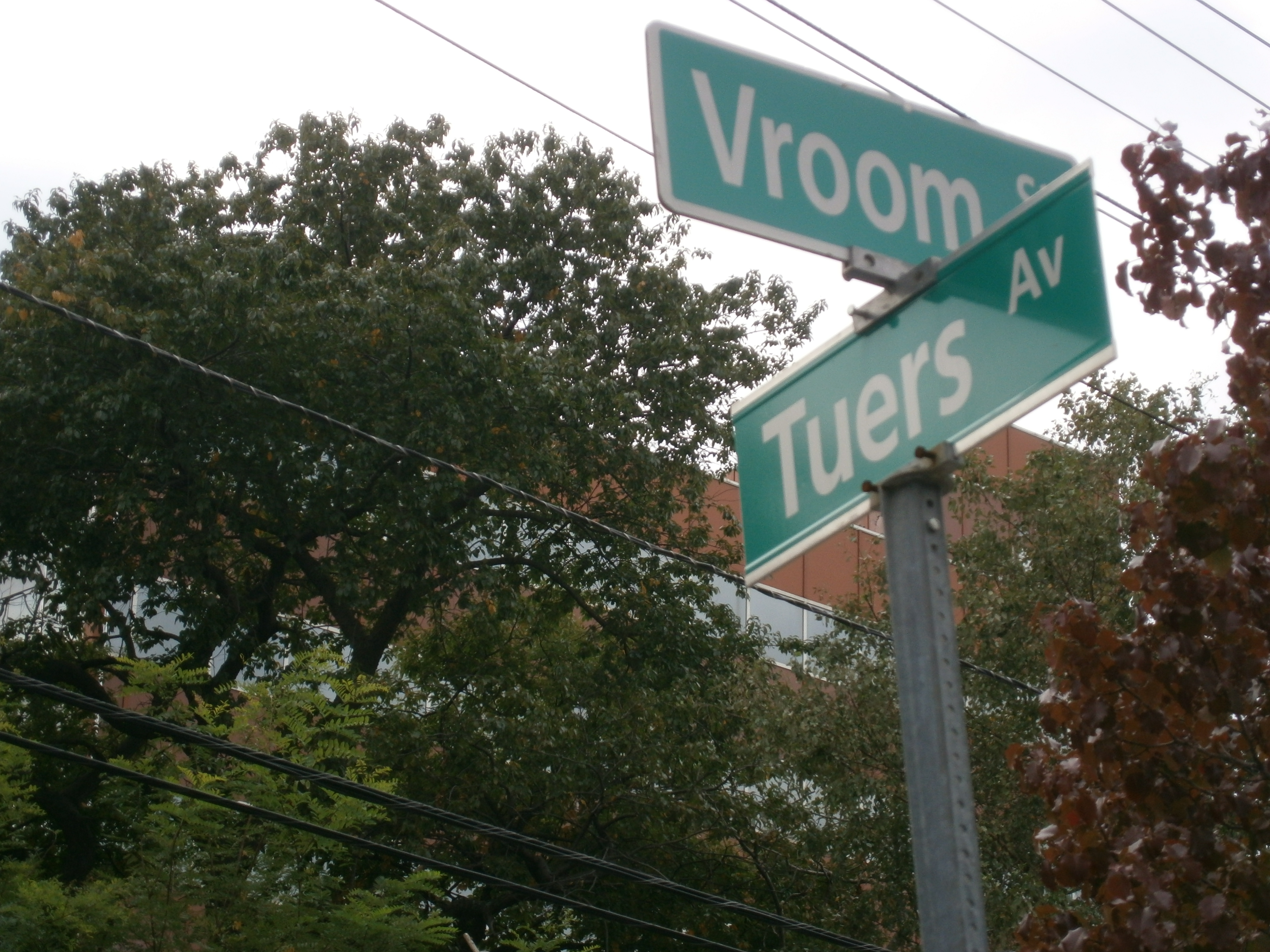
Street names near Bergen Square recall the early settlers

Jane and her husband Nicholas Tuers (1736/37–1815) (or Toers) lived as farmers in Bergen Township, New Jersey (now known as Jersey City). One day in September 1780, while selling farm goods in British-occupied Manhattan, Tuers stopped in Fraunces Tavern and spoke with the owner, Samuel Fraunces. He informed Tuers that British soldiers were in his tavern toasting the hero of the Battles of Saratoga, General Benedict Arnold, who was to deliver West Point to the British. When Tuers returned to Bergen later that day, she informed her brother Daniel Van Reypen about the conspiracy. Van Reypen rode to Hackensack to meet with General Anthony Wayne who then sent Van Reypen to inform General George Washington of the conspiracy. This information confirmed what Washington had suspected of Arnold. The arrest of John André a few days later on September 23, 1780 confirmed the conspiracy. André was later tried, convicted, and hanged as a spy on October 2, 1780. Arnold would later defect to the British to escape prosecution.

Jane Tuers died in 1834 and was buried in the Old Bergen Church Cemetery.

The house that she lived in was located on Bergen Avenue across from the Tise Tavern. The house survived until 1894, when it was demolished to make room for the construction of the old Fourth Regiment Armory. The site is now home to Hudson Catholic Regional High School. A plaque on the exterior of Hudson Catholic reads: "This marks the site of the home of JANE TUERS, a heroine of the American Revolution" Presented by the Jane Tuers Society C. A. R. 1925". Streets near Bergen Square bear both the Tuers and Van Reypen family name.

== See also ==
- Bergen Square
- Three Pigeons
- John Champe (soldier)
