= Samuel Fraunces =

American restaurateur

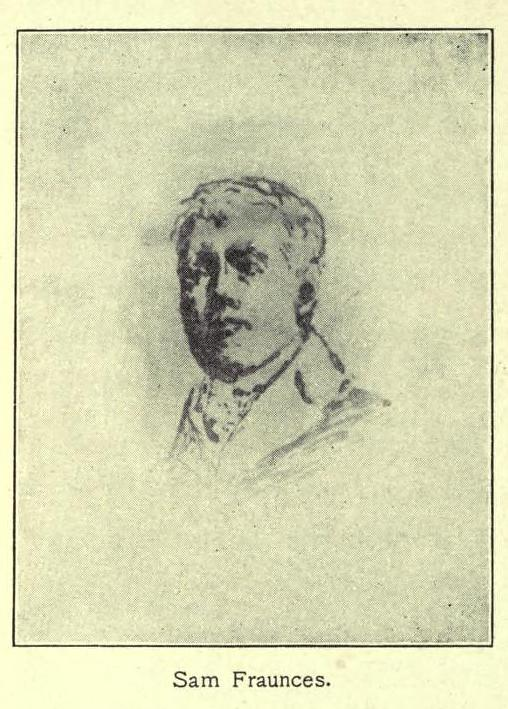
Sam Fraunces, c. 1900 engraving, based on an undated ink sketch attributed to John Trumbull. The ink sketch is privately owned.

Samuel Fraunces (1722/23 (Note: The year of his birth is computed from his October 13, 1795 death notice in the Gazette of the United States, which listed his age as 73.) – October 10, 1795) was an American restaurateur and the owner/operator of Fraunces Tavern in New York City. During the Revolutionary War, he provided for prisoners held during the seven-year British occupation of New York City (1776-1783), and later claimed to have been a spy for the American side. At the end of the war, it was at Fraunces Tavern that General George Washington said farewell to his officers. Fraunces later served as steward of Washington's presidential households in New York City (1789–1790) and Philadelphia (1791–1794).

Since the mid-19th century, there has been a dispute over Fraunces's racial identity. Some 19th- and 20th-century sources described Fraunces as "a negro man" (1838), "swarthy" (1878), "mulatto" (1916), "Negro" (1916), "coloured" (1930), "fastidious old Negro" (1934), and "Haitian Negro" (1962), but even the earliest of these date from several decades after his death. According to his 1983 biographer, Kym S. Rice: "During the Revolutionary era, Fraunces was commonly referred to as 'Black Sam'. Some have taken references such as these as an indication that Fraunces was a black man. ...[W]hat is known of his life indicates he was a white man." As Rice noted in her Documentary History of Fraunces Tavern (1985): "Other than the appearance of the nickname, there are no known references where Fraunces was described as a black man" during his lifetime.

The familiar oil-on-canvas portrait, long identified as depicting Samuel Fraunces and exhibited at Fraunces Tavern since 1913, was recently discredited by new evidence. In 2017, German historian Arthur Kuhle recognized the sitter as the same sitter in a portrait at a Dresden museum. Kuhle suspects that the unidentified man in both portraits had been a member of Prussian king Frederick the Great's royal court.

== Origins ==
There is a tradition that Samuel Fraunces was of French ancestry and came from the West Indies. There are claims that he was born in Jamaica, Haiti, Martinique, and the possibility that he was related to a Fraunces family in Barbados. Although his surname implies that he was of French extraction, there is no evidence that he spoke with a French accent. There is also no record of where he learned his skills as a cook, caterer, and restaurateur.

== Taverns ==
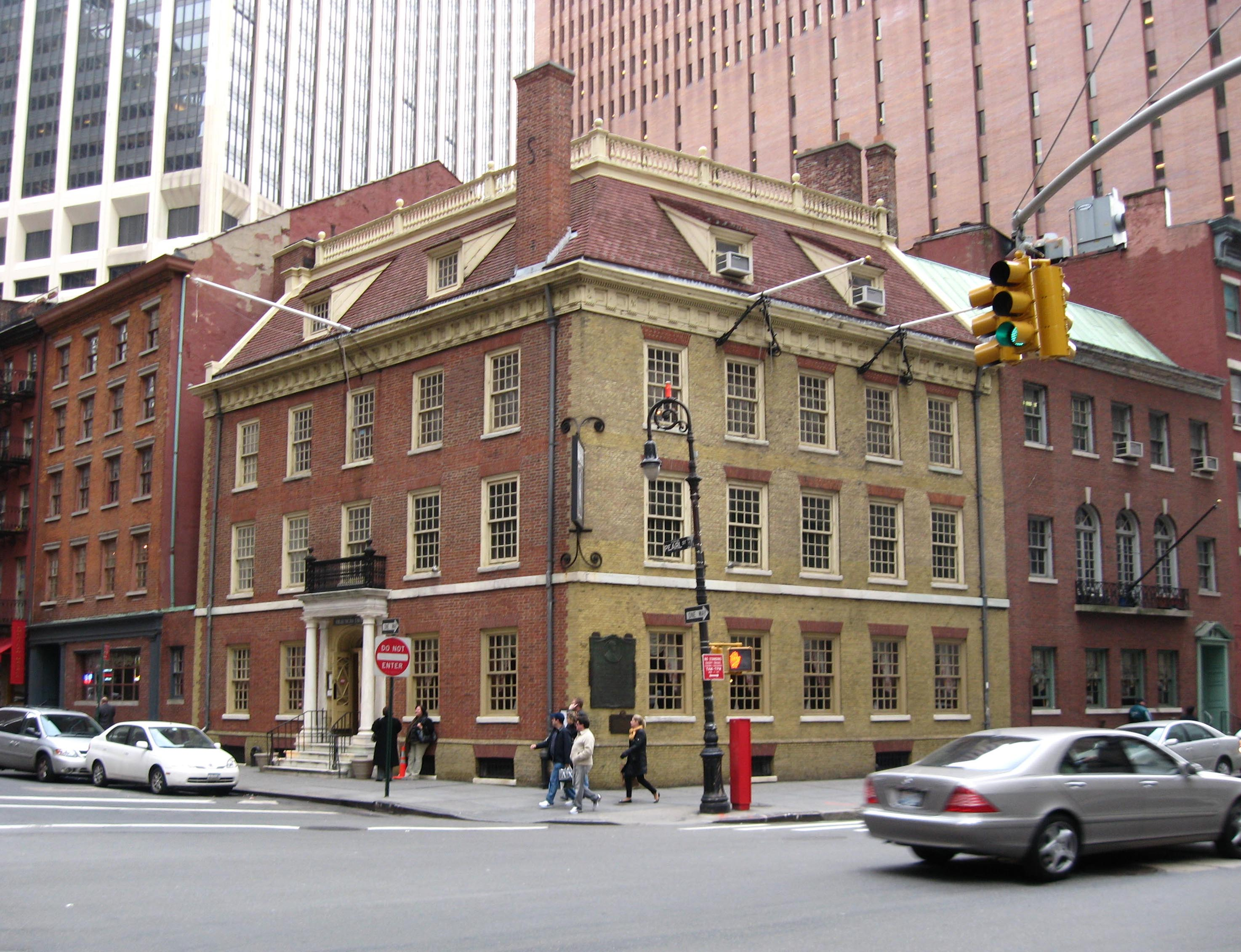
Fraunces Tavern (formerly the Oliver Delancey Mansion), Pearl & Dock Streets, New York City.

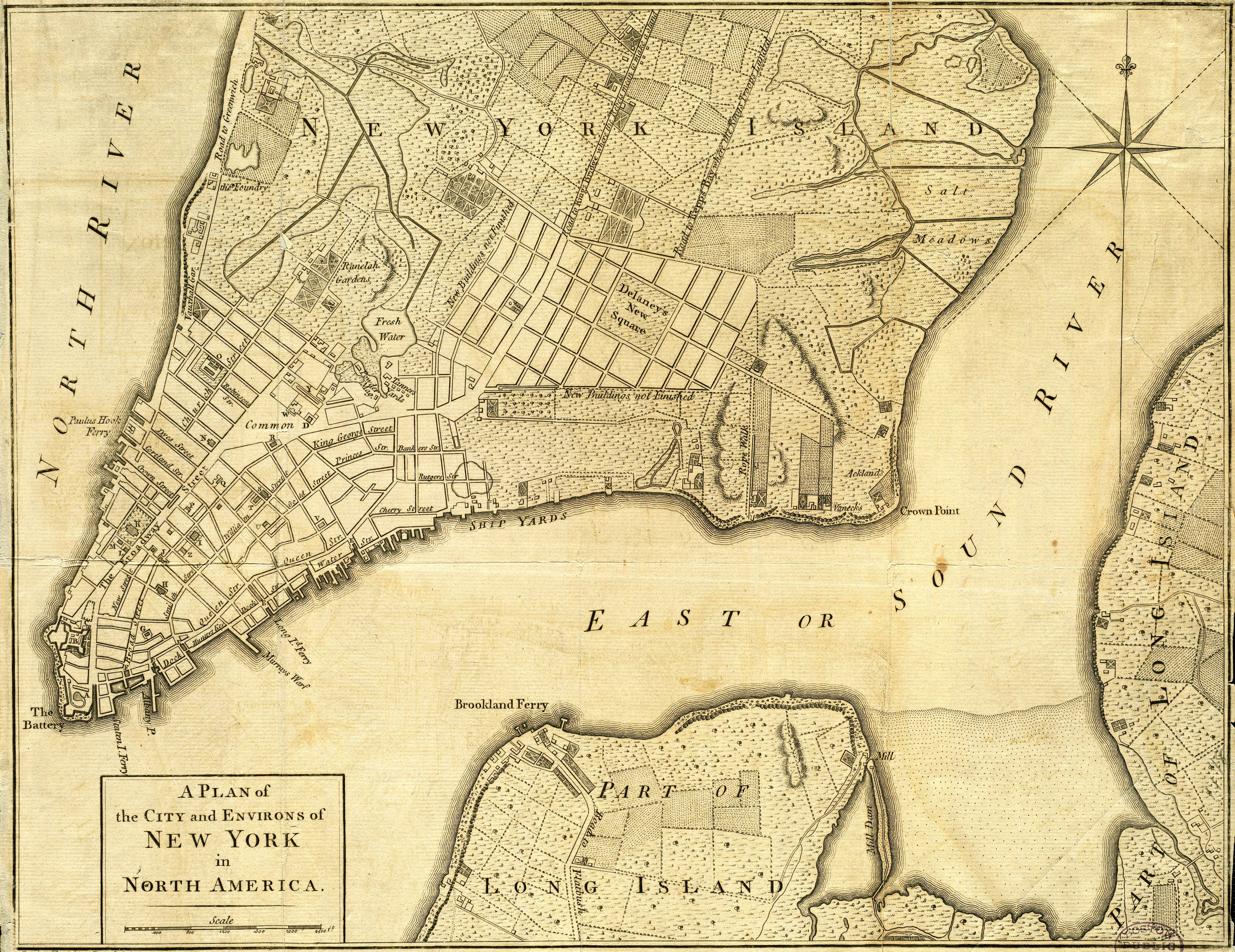
New York City in 1776, Fraunces's tavern was at the west end of Queen Street (now Pearl Street). "Vauxhall Gar[dens]" is marked along the North River, at far left, above center.

The first documentation of Fraunces's presence in New York City was in February 1755, when he registered as a British subject and "Innholder." The following year he was issued a tavern license, but where he worked for the next two years is unidentified. From 1758 to 1762, he operated the Free Mason's Arms Tavern at Broadway and Queen Street.

In 1762 he mortgaged and rented out the Free Mason's Arms, and purchased the Oliver Delancey mansion at Pearl and Dock Streets. He opened this as the Sign of Queen Charlotte Tavern, but within a year it was better known as the Queen's Head Tavern (possibly due to the queen's face on a painted sign). In addition to the usual restaurant fare, Fraunces offered fixed-price dinners, catered meals delivered, and sold preserved items such as bottled soups, ketchup, nuts, pickled fruits and vegetables, oysters, jellies and marmalades. Although the tavern featured five lodging-rooms, it was better known as a place for private meetings, parties and receptions, and card-playing.

Fraunces rented out the former Delancey mansion in 1765, and moved his family to Philadelphia, Pennsylvania, opening a Queen's Head Tavern on Front Street in that city. The following year he moved the tavern to a building on Water Street. He returned to New York City in early 1768, and sold the Free Mason's Arms. He resumed operation of his tavern in the former Delancey mansion in 1770.

Spring Hill – a villa along the Hudson River under lease to Major Thomas James – was heavily vandalized in the November 1765 Stamp Act Riot. Fraunces leased the property, opening it in 1767 as a summer resort: Vaux-Hall Pleasure Garden, (named for London's Vauxhall Gardens). The villa featured large rooms, and its extensive grounds were the setting for concerts and public entertainments. Fraunces exhibited ten life-sized wax statues of historical figures (possibly modeled by him), debuting them in a garden setting in July 1768. He later exhibited seventy miniature wax figures from the Bible, and life-size wax statues of King George III and Queen Charlotte. He operated Vaux-Hall through Summer 1773; in October, he auctioned its contents and sold the property.

Fraunces continued to operate the Queen's Head Tavern through the early years of the Revolutionary War, but fled when the British captured New York City in September 1776.

== Revolutionary War ==
A month after the April 19, 1775 battles of Lexington and Concord in Massachusetts, the Royal Navy ship of the line Asia sailed into New York Harbor. On August 23, a group of Patriots stole the cannons from the fort on The Battery, which prompted Asia to bombard the city with cannon fire that night. There were no deaths, but injuries and damage to buildings, including Fraunces Tavern. Philip Freneau wrote a poem about the bombardment, "Hugh Gaines Life," that included the couplet: "At first we supposed it was only a sham. Till she drove a round ball through the roof of Black Sam."

The tavern was used for more than entertainment during the Revolutionary War. Fraunces rented out office space, and meetings of the New York Provincial Congress were held there. In April 1776, General Washington was present at a court-martial conducted at the tavern.

Washington's headquarters, April 17 to August 27, 1776, was Richmond Hill, a villa two miles north of the tavern. Fraunces later swore that he discovered and foiled an assassination plot against Washington. The supposed plotter, Thomas Hickey, one of Washington's life-guards, was court-martialed, and executed on June 28:

Congress, I doubt not, will have heard of the plot, that was forming among many disaffected persons in this city and government for aiding the King's troops upon their arrival. No regular plan seems to have been digested; but several persons have been enlisted, and sworn to join them. The matter, I am in hopes, by a timely discovery, will be suppressed and put a stop to. Many citizens and others, among whom is the mayor, are now in confinement. The matter has been traced up to Governor Tryon; and the mayor appears to have been a principal agent or go-between him and the persons concerned in it. The plot had been communicated to some of the army, and part of my guard engaged in it. Thomas Hickey, one of them, has been tried, and, by the unanimous opinion of a court-martial, is sentenced to die, having enlisted himself, and engaged others. The sentence, by the advice of the whole council of general officers, will be put in execution to-day at eleven o'clock. The others are not tried. I am hopeful this example will produce many salutary consequences, and deter others from entering into the like traitorous practices. — George Washington to the President of Congress, 28 June 1776.

=== British Occupation of New York City (September 1776 - November 1783) ===
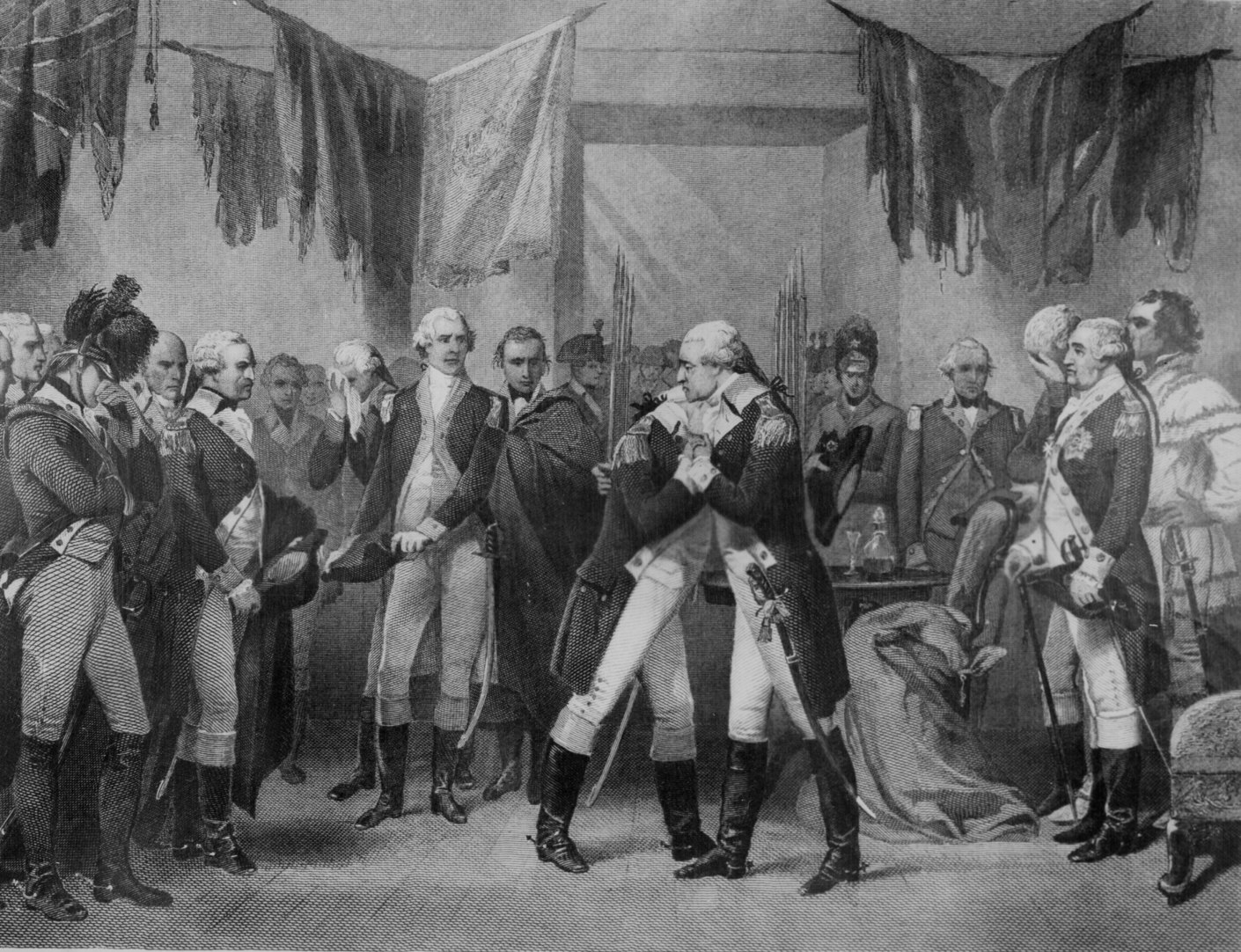
Washington's Farewell to His Troops by Alonzo Chappel (1866)

British troops captured lower Manhattan on September 15, 1776, and soon occupied all of what is now New York City. Fraunces and his family left "previous to its being taken Possession of by the British Forces," and fled to Elizabeth, New Jersey. Fraunces was captured in June 1778, brought back to New York City, and impressed into working as the cook for British General James Robertson. Fraunces later swore that he used this as an opportunity to smuggle food to American prisoners of war, giving them clothing and money, and helping them to escape. He also swore to have passed information about the British occupation and troop movements to General Washington and others. According to the Jane Tuers legend, Fraunces overheard British officers toasting Continental Army general Benedict Arnold, and sent a warning (through Tuers) that Arnold was a traitor.

Lord Cornwallis surrendered at Yorktown in October 1781, but British forces continued to occupy New York City until 1783. Fraunces's tavern was the meeting place for negotiations between American and British commissioners to end the 7-year occupation. In May 1783, peace negotiations were held at the DeWint House in Tappan, New York, where Fraunces provided meals for General Washington, British General Sir Guy Carleton, and both their staffs. Carleton's Book of Negroes – a ledger listing some 3,000 fugitive slaves who had fled to the British and been promised freedom in return for their service – was compiled at the former Fraunces Tavern between April 26 and November 30, 1783. The "Black Loyalists" were settled in Nova Scotia and Sierra Leone. The British evacuation from New York City was celebrated by patriots with a November 25, 1783 dinner at the tavern.

At a December 4, 1783 dinner in the tavern's Long Room, Washington said an emotional farewell to his officers and made his famous toast: "With a heart full of love and gratitude, I now take leave of you: I most devoutly wish that your latter days may be as prosperous and happy, as you former ones have been glorious and honorable."

== Memorial to Congress ==
In a March 5, 1785 memorial (sworn petition) to the U.S. Congress, Fraunces sought compensation for his service to the country in foiling an assassination plot against Washington, supplying provisions to American prisoners, and providing intelligence on British troops: (Note: Fraunces's 1785 sworn petition to Congress documents the 1776 assassination plot against Washington. At least 4 contemporaneous sources mention the plot: Dr. Solomon Drowne to his sister Sally Drowne, New York, June 24, 1776; Dr. Solomon Drowne to his brother William Drowne, New York, July 13, 1776; both quoted in Henry Russell Drowne, A Sketch of Fraunces Tavern and Those Connected with Its History (New York: Fraunces Tavern, 1919), pp. 8, 10; Peter T. Curtenius to Richard Varick, New York, June 22, 1776, quoted in Robert Hughes, George Washington (New York: 1927), p. 392; and Joseph Hewes to Samuel Johnson, Philadelphia, July 8, 1776, in William Powell, ed., Correspondence of William Tryon 2 (1768-1818) (Raleigh, NC: 1981), p. 862. Significantly, Congress's report on Fraunces's petition acknowledged the existence of the assassination plot.)

That your Memorialist, being from Principle attached to the Cause of America, removed from the City of New York previous to its being taken Possession of by the British Forces, into Elizabeth Town in the State of New Jersey. That he was their [sic] made Prisoner by the Enemy who after plundering his Family of almost every necessary brought him to the City of New York.

That he was the Person that first discovered the Conspiracy which was formed in the Year 1776 against the Life of his Excellency General Washington and that the Suspicions Which were Entertained of his agency in that Important Discovery accationed [sic, occasioned] a public Enquiry after he was made a Prisoner on which the want of positive Proof alone preserved his Life.
That your Memorialist though for many Years before the War a Respectable Innholder in this City submitted to serve for some time in the Menial Office of Cook in the Family of [British] General [James] Robertson without any Pay or Perquisite whatever, Except for the Priveledge [sic] of disposing of the Remnants of the Table which he appropriated towards the Comfort of the American Prisoners within the City in whom the Exercise of the Commonest Acts of Humanity was at that time Considered a Crime of the deepest Dye.
That in this Station and other Periods of the War, he served with zeal, and at the Hazard of his Life, the Cause of America, not only by supplying Prisoners with Money, Food, and Raiments and facilitating their Escapes but by performing Services of a Confidential Nature and of the utmost Importance to the Operations of the American Army.

That your Memorialist in Consequence of the heavy Advances he has made to American Prisoners (the far greater part of which is not yet Reimbursed) and other solid Proof of his Zeal for the Cause of Freedom, is now reduced to so Critical a Situation as to see himself, his Wife and a numerous Family on the Precipice of Beggary unless the Generous and humane Hand of you Honorable House should be Extended to himself.

Congress's report on the Fraunces memorial acknowledged his role as "instrumental in discovering and defeating" the assassination plot. For debts incurred during the Revolutionary War, Congress awarded Fraunces £2000, and a later payment covered accumulated interest. The State of New York awarded him £200, and Congress paid $1,625 to lease his tavern for two years to house federal government offices. Two weeks after the lease was signed, Fraunces sold the tavern and retired to a farm in Monmouth County, New Jersey.

== Presidential households ==
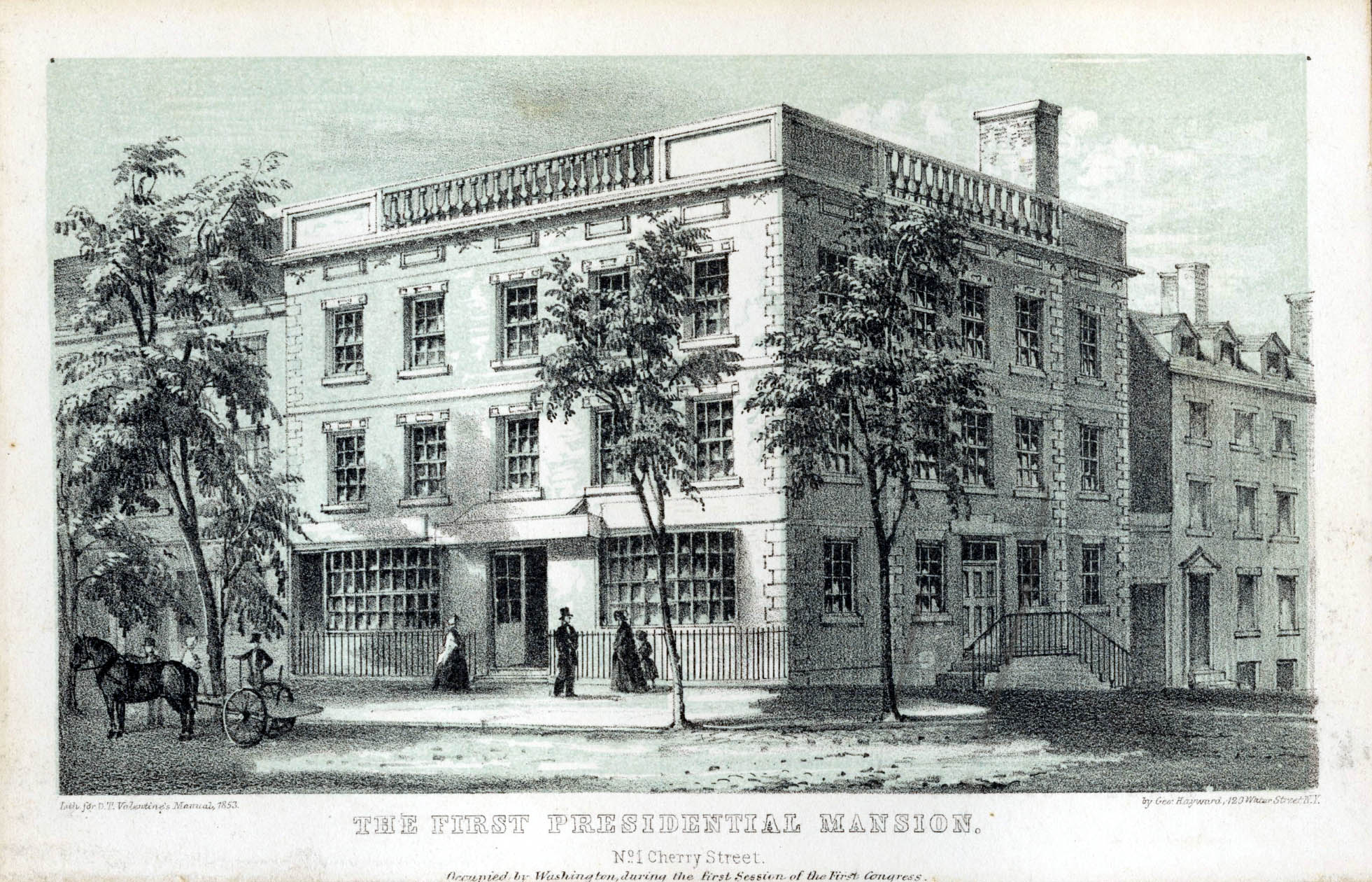
Samuel Osgood House in New York City

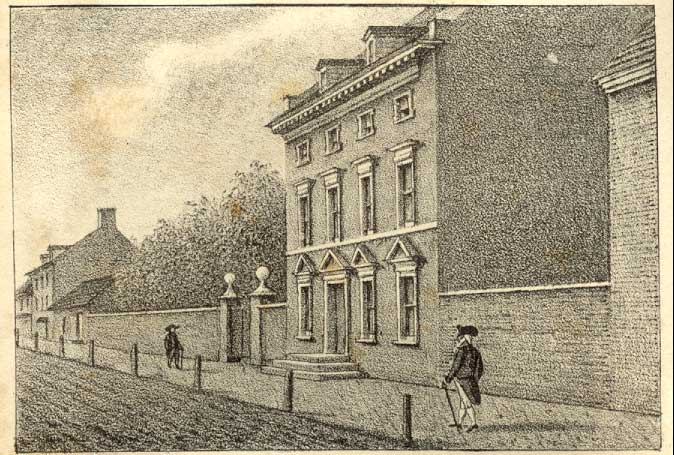
President's House in Philadelphia

George Washington got to know Fraunces during the Revolutionary War. Their relationship was closer to master and servant than equals, but Washington clearly respected his judgment and repeatedly sought his recommendations on sundries such as glassware and china, and his advice on household management and hiring servants.

Washington was Congress's unanimous choice to serve as first President of the United States. He arrived in New York City on April 23, 1789, and took up residence at the Samuel Osgood House, at Cherry and Franklin Streets. Fraunces came out of retirement to serve as steward of the presidential household, managing a staff of about 20, including 7 enslaved Africans from Mount Vernon. (Note: The enslaved Africans held in New York were Moll (nanny for Martha Washington's grandchildren), Oney Judge (Martha Washington's body servant), Will Lee (Washington's body servant), Christopher Sheels (assistant to Will Lee), and Austin, Giles and Paris (stable workers).) Washington was not entirely satisfied with Fraunces, and dismissed him in February 1790, (Note: The incident that prompted Fraunces's dismissal involved his serving wine to the household staff, contrary to Washington's orders.) prior to the household's move to the Alexander Macomb House, at 39-41 Broadway.

Under the July 1790 Residence Act, Congress designated Philadelphia the temporary national capital for a 10-year period, while the permanent national capital was under construction in the District of Columbia. Congress convened in Philadelphia on December 6, 1790. The household staff at the Philadelphia President's House was slightly larger, about 24 servants, initially including 8 enslaved Africans from Mount Vernon. (Note: The enslaved Africans held in Philadelphia initially were Moll, Oney Judge, Christopher Sheels (Washington's body servant), Hercules (cook), Richmond (kitchen worker and Hercules's teenage son), and stableworkers Austin, Giles and Paris. Pennsylvania's Gradual Abolition Act made the temporary capital a hostile place for slaveholders, and Washington returned some of the enslaved to Mount Vernon, replacing them with white servants. Following Austin's December 1794 death, "Postilion" Joe was brought up from Mount Vernon. Oney Judge escaped to freedom from Philadelphia in May 1796.) Washington grew dissatisfied with his steward in Philadelphia, and persuaded Fraunces to come out of retirement again. Fraunces at first expressed skepticism about cooking alongside Washington's enslaved cook from Mount Vernon, Hercules, (Note: "Fraunces arrived here on Wednesday [May 11], and after signing his Articles of Agreement—going over the things in the house & signing an inventory thereof, entered upon the duties of his station. I think I have made the agreement as full, explicit & binding as any thing of the kind can be. In the Articles prohibiting the use of wine at his table—and obliging him to be particular in the discharge of his duty in the Kitchen & to perform the Cooking with Hercules—I have been peculiarly pointed. He readily assented to them all (except that respecting Hercules, upon which he made the following observation—'I must first learn Hercules' abilities & readiness to do things, which if good, (as good as Mrs Read's) will enable me to do the Cooking without any other professional assistance in the Kitchen; but this experiment cannot be made until the return of the President when there may be occasion for him to exert his talents'—).") but they appear to have worked smoothly together. (Note: "The chief cook would have been termed in modern parlance, a celebrated artiste. He was named Hercules, and familiarly termed Uncle Harkless. ... [He] was, at the period of the first presidency, as highly accomplished a proficient in the culinary art as could be found in the United States. ... The steward, and indeed the whole household, treated the chief cook with much respect, as well for his valuable services as for his general good character and pleasing manners. ... It was while preparing the Thursday or Congress dinner that Uncle Harkless a shone in all his splendor. ... [H]e, the great master-spirit, seemed to possess the power of ubiquity, and to be everywhere at the same moment. ... When the steward in snow-white apron, silk shorts and stockings, and hair in full powder, placed the first dish on the table, the clock being on the stroke of four, "the labors of Hercules" ceased.") Fraunces headed the Philadelphia presidential household for three years, from May 1791 to June 1794.

Following his retirement from the presidential household, Fraunces operated a tavern on 2nd Street in Philadelphia for a year. In June 1795, he assumed proprietorship of the Tun Tavern, at 59 South Water Street.

== Personal life ==
Fraunces may have had a first wife named Mary Carlile. He married Elizabeth Dally at Trinity Church, Manhattan on November 30, 1757. They had seven children: Andrew Gautier Fraunces, Elizabeth Fraunces Thompson, Catherine Fraunces Smock, Sophia Fraunces Gomez, Sarah Fraunces Campbell, Samuel M. Fraunces, and Hannah Louisa Fraunces Kelly. (Note: Fraunces listed his 7 children in his Will. He named his son Samuel as Executor of his Estate, and Guardian for his minor daughter Hannah.) Andrew G. Fraunces worked in the U.S. Treasury Department until 1793, when he published a pamphlet denouncing Alexander Hamilton for his financial dealings. Some of the other children ran hotels or boardinghouses.

Fraunces died in Philadelphia a year after retiring from the presidential household. A death notice appeared in the Gazette of the United States on October 13, 1795:

DIED - On Saturday Evening last, MR. SAMUEL FRAUNCES, aged 73 years. By his death, Society has sustained the loss of an honest man, and the Poor a valuable friend."

Fraunces was buried in an unmarked grave at St. Peter's Church, Philadelphia.

His younger son, Samuel M. Fraunces, served as executor of his estate, and was listed as an "Inn keeper" at 59 South Water Street in the 1795 Philadelphia Directory.

== Racial Identity and Slaveholding ==
=== 18th Century ===
Fraunces employed servants, including indentured servants, and held enslaved Africans in bondage in New York City. In 1778, he advertised the auction of a 14-year-old enslaved male. The 1790 United States census for New York listed Samuel Fraunces as a free white male, with four free white women, and one slave in his household.

=== 19th Century ===
In 1838, Samuel Cooper, a supposed witness to Washington's 1783 farewell dinner to his officers at Fraunces Tavern—fifty-five years earlier—called Fraunces "a negro man." In an 1878 history of Freemasonry in New York State, Joseph Nerée Balestier described Fraunces as "swarthy."

=== 20th Century ===
In August, 1916, syndicated newspaper columnist Frederic J. Haskin presented the Phoebe Fraunces legend as fact in The Washington Evening Star, one of the national capital's major newspapers. Sociologist W.E.B. Du Bois—co-founder of the NAACP and founding editor of its monthly magazine—reprinted much of Haskin's article in the December, 1916 issue of The Crisis, under the headline "COLORED". Du Bois may have written the article's introduction and added the comments interspersed between its quoted sections (added comments underlined below):

It is always comparatively easy to deny the accomplishments of colored folk by the simple expedient of forgetting that those who have done anything were colored. Who has not heard of Fraunces Tavern down at the Battery in New York? Frederick [sic] J. Haskin, writing in the Washington, D. C. Evening Star says:

“George Washington and nearly all of his officers came here when he bade them his famous farewell, while at the time that 'Black Sam' Fraunces dispensed good dinners here nearly every one of any consequence in New York came to dine.”

Black Sam Fraunces, mind you, although the “black” is usually omitted.

“The place got its name and its real start in life in 1757 when it was purchased by a thrifty West Indian Negro, Samuel Fraunces, who was commonly known as 'Black Sam' and who seems to have been a cook and caterer of talent if not genius. A consideration of the story of Fraunces Tavern shows that the place of cooks in history has been overlooked and underestimated. It is they who bring great men together and cause great events to be planned and set on foot. Thus the Sons of Liberty and their vigilance committee got together at Black Sam’s and planned to throw England’s tea overboard before they would pay a tax on it; and here met the famous committee in correspondence, of which we never heard before, but which, according to the History Club, which quotes Woodrow Wilson, was the real beginning and origin of the Continental Congress and so the seed from which our great and glorious republic sprang.”

There is romance that goes with the place, too:

“But it appears that plots against liberty as well as for it were fomented at Black Sam’s. For in 1776 there were men in England who saw that the great personality of Washington was one of the greatest dangers to England’s hold upon the colonies, and these men were not above removing the danger as best they could.

"So it happened that a frequenter of Black Sam’s place was a young Englishman named Hickey, who had deserted from the British army and enlisted as an American volunteer. Because he was a clever man, despite his bad record, he had become one of General Washington’s bodyguard.

"This man was the king-pin in a plot to assassinate Washington, and the first step in the plan was for him to win the help of the general’s housekeeper. This person was none other than the young and attractive West Indian girl, Phoebe Fraunces, daughter of Black Sam. The murderer first won her heart and made her his mistress. Then he let her know his plan and the part she was to play. There is no record of the struggle that took place in the mind of Phoebe Fraunces when she found that the man she loved was the appointed murderer of her master. But the fact remains that she revealed the plot to Washington and saw her lover hanged."

Thirty-eight years later, Dr. F. E. Norman, a Chicago dentist and Black man, wrote to Du Bois, asking him to resolve the question of Fraunces's racial identity and enclosing payment in advance: "Samuel Fraunces was a cook without a peer. He was born in the West Indies. The elite of New York wined and dined at this hostelry. … I want to know if Fraunces was a Negro, or one of African descent." Du Bois responded with the results of his research (which were inconclusive on racial identity), on October 1, 1954.

Also in the 1950s, Troy Saul McCurley, a Virginia newspaper editor and the widow of John Fraunces McCurley, assembled a large cache of historical documents and references consistent with Samuel Fraunces having been white. She deposited copies of her research at the Historical Society of Pennsylvania, the New York Historical Society, and the Fraunces Tavern Museum. Her husband had been a descendant of Samuel Fraunces, and they named their daughter Elizabeth Fraunces McCurley, calling her "Fraun".

In the 1980s, historian and Samuel Fraunces biographer Kym S. Rice found no 18th-century references to his having been Black. She documented Fraunces's history as a slaveholder in New York, his inclusion on the voter rolls (limited to white men of property); his membership in the Freemasons (restricted to white men), and his records as a member of the congregation and as a pew-renter at Trinity Church, Manhattan. (Blacks could attend services at Trinity Church, but not become members of the congregation.)

=== 21st Century ===
Cheryl Janifer Laroche, a historian who worked on the 2007 President's House excavation in Philadelphia, noted conflicting stories depicting the Fraunces family as both mulatto and white.

In 2011, Jennifer Patton, Director of Education at the Fraunces Tavern Museum in New York City, wrote: "The use of " black" as a prefix to a nickname was not uncommon in the 18th century and did not necessarily indicate African heritage of an individual. For instance, Admiral Richard Lord Howe (1762- 1799), one of Britain's best known and respected seamen – and a white man – was commonly called "Black Dick," a nickname his brother Sir William Howe gave to him as descriptive of the Admiral's swarthy complexion." Patton concluded: "The issue of Samuel Fraunces' racial identity is still a passionate topic of discussion to this very day. As debate rallies on for conclusive evidence, the actual truth is that we may never know for sure."

== Portraits ==
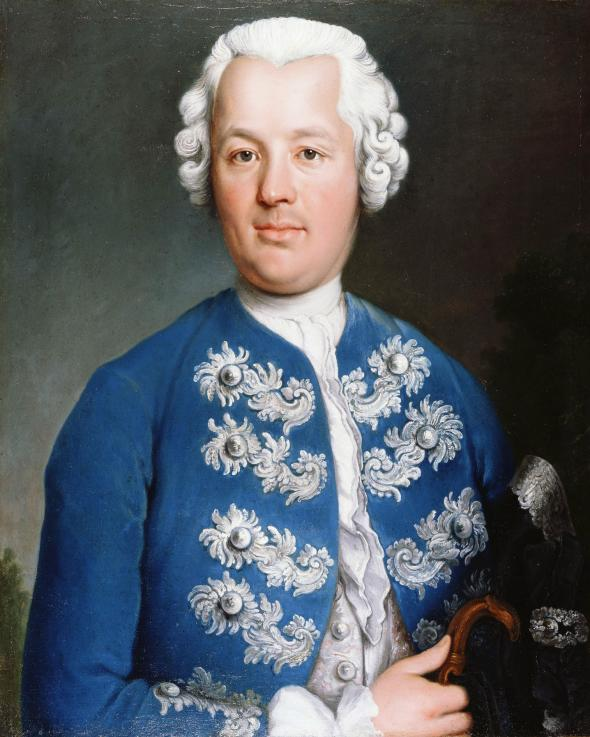
Portrait of an Unknown Gentleman, unknown artist, oil on canvas, Fraunces Tavern Museum, New York City. For more than a century, this portrait was identified as depicting Samuel Fraunces. New evidence presented in 2017 strongly suggests that it depicts a member of the court of Prussian ruler Frederick the Great.

The oil-on-canvas portrait to the right was exhibited at Fraunces Tavern from 1913 to 2017. Purchased at auction for the Sons of the Revolution, it was unveiled at their December 4, 1913 annual meeting. (Note: "We have also recently acquired the old portrait of Samuel Fraunces, the original proprietor of Fraunces Tavern, which will be an interesting addition to display in the entrance hall.") The painting came from the collection of Anna E. Macy of Riveredge, New Jersey, and was auctioned at Merwin Sales Company, November 17, 1913. The auction catalogue described it as: "Artist Unknown / Colonial Period / Portrait of Samuel Fraunces / Canvas. Height 29in: width, 23in." Art forensic experts examined the portrait in October 2016, and concluded that it dated from the 18th century.

In 2017, however, German historian Arthur Kuhle recognized the Fraunces Tavern portrait's sitter as being the same man as the unidentified sitter in a portrait titled Cavalier at the Staatliche Kunstsammlungen in Dresden, Germany. Kuhle was researching Frederick the Great and his court painters, Antoine Pesne and Joachim Martin Falbe. Kuhle suspects that the Fraunces Tavern portrait and the Dresden portrait depict the same member of Frederick the Great's royal court.

The engraving at the top of this article is based on an ink sketch that descended in the Fraunces family. The undated sketch is attributed to John Trumbull, signed with a cipher of his initials and inscribed: "from Fraunce [sic] of Fraunces Tavern." The engraving was published as an illustration in Alice Morse Earle, Stagecoach and Tavern Days (1900), page 184. Earle credited it as: "Sam Fraunces. From original drawing. Owned by Mrs. A. Livingston Mason, Newport, R.I."

== Phoebe Fraunces legend ==
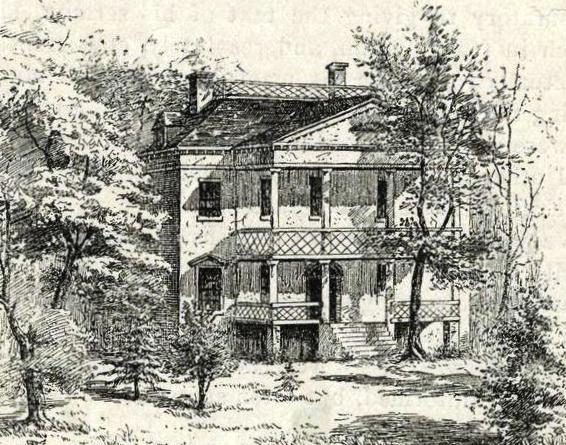
Richmond Hill, Washington's headquarters in Manhattan, April – August, 1776

The legend tells that the life of General George Washington was saved during the Revolutionary War by a daughter of Samuel Fraunces named Phoebe. Thomas Hickey, one of Washington's life guards, became romantically involved with Phoebe and enlisted her in a plot to poison the general's food. Phoebe reported Hickey to Washington (or to her father, who then told Washington), and pretended to play along with the plot. Hickey was caught red-handed poisoning the general's food, and was court-martialed and hanged.

=== Popularization by Lossing ===
Antiquarian Benson J. Lossing popularized the Phoebe Fraunces legend.

George Washington Parke Custis (1781–1857), the grandson of Martha Washington, wrote a series of articles for American newspapers recollecting the personal side of his step-grandfather, George Washington. Following Custis's death, Lossing edited his writings for publication as Recollections and Private Memoirs of George Washington (1860). Custis had written three anecdotes about Samuel Fraunces (page 411, page 420, pages 420-22), and mentioned him indirectly in a fourth (pages 422-23). To one of Custis's anecdotes, Lossing added a footnote describing an assassination attempt on General Washington:

When Washington and his army occupied the city in the summer of 1776, the chief resided at Richmond hill, a little out of town, afterward the seat of Aaron Burr. Fraunces's daughter was Washington's housekeeper, and she saved his life on one occasion, by exposing the intentions of Hickey, one of the Life-Guard (already mentioned [page 257]), who was about to murder the general, by putting poison in a dish of peas prepared for his table.

Lossing expanded on the "poisoned peas story" in his three-volume Life of Washington (1860), published the same year. He repeated the story again a decade later in his Washington and the American Republic (1870):

Washington was very fond of green peas, and it was agreed that when a dish of them was ready for the general's table, Hickey should put the poison in it. Meanwhile the housekeeper disclosed the plot to the general. The peas were poisoned. Washington made some excuse for sending the dish away, and Hickey was soon afterward arrested. The peas were given to some hens, in his presence, when they immediately sickened and died.[*]
Hickey and his associates of the guard, were arrested immediately after dinner, on the twenty-third; and, according to a letter written at New York the next day, "the general's housekeeper was taken up," on suspicion of being an accomplice. She was the daughter of Samuel Fraunces, a noted innkeeper at that time ... It was chiefly on the testimony of this woman that Hickey was arrested, tried, and condemned.
[*]These facts were related to a friend of the writer (Mr. W.J. Davis), by the late Peter Embury, of New York, who resided in the city at the time, was well acquainted with the general's housekeeper, and was present at the execution of Hickey.

In the patriotic build-up to the 1876 Centennial Celebration, Lossing's story was retold in Scribner's Monthly Magazine, but with Samuel Fraunces's previously anonymous daughter identified as "Phoebe":

A daughter of "Black Sam," Phoebe Fraunces, was Washington's housekeeper when he had his headquarters in New York in the spring of 1776, and was the means of defeating a conspiracy against his life. One part of the plan was the poisoning of the American commander. Its immediate agent was to be Thomas Hickey, a deserter from the British army, who had become a member of Washington's body guard. Fortunately the conspirator fell desperately in love with Phoebe Fraunces, and made her his confidant. She revealed the plot to her father, and at an opportune moment the dénouement came. Hickey was arrested and tried by court-martial. A few days afterward he was hanged ...

The legend was retold 56 years later in the 1932 bicentennial celebration of George Washington's birth. Unaccountably, the location of the supposed events was changed from Richmond Hill to Fraunces Tavern. (Note: "It was during this period that Washington first stopped at Fraunces Tavern, Broad and Pearl Streets. Here Phoebe Fraunces, serving as the General's housekeeper, discovered her lover, a deserter from the British, to be in a plot to assassinate him. Phoebe must have loved her country more than she did her sweetheart, for she unhesitatingly went to Washington with the entire story and the traitor was sent to his death. As a reward Washington, when he became President, made Samuel Fraunces, Phoebe's father, his steward.")

=== Disputed claims ===
The story that Washington had been the target of an assassination plot by poisoning was published in England as early as 1778: "Advise is received from America that two persons, a man and a woman who lived as servants with General Washington, have been executed in the presence of the army for conspiring to poison their master." — The Ipswich Journal, October 31, 1778.

==== Rice's research ====
In the 1980s, Fraunces biographer Kym S. Rice published new evidence discrediting the Phoebe Fraunces legend.

Washington's headquarters in Manhattan, from April 17 to August 27, 1776, was at Richmond Hill. Initially, his housekeeper there was a widow named Mary Smith. Washington apparently dined at the Queen's Head Tavern at least twice, on April 13, with his aides: "Dinner at Sam's - [£]5.3.6", and on June 6, (probably with Martha Washington): "Saml Frances, Alias Black Sam - for Dinner - [£]3.14.0". On June 15, one of his life guards, Thomas Hickey, was arrested on charges of "attempt[ing] to pass counterfeit Bills of Credit" and held in jail until trial. (Note: "New York Provincial Congress: Die Sabbati [Saturday], A.M. June 15, 1776. Ordered, That the said Micha Lynch and Thomas Hickey be committed to the Guard in the City-Hall, where Israel Youngs and others are now confined, and that copies of the Affidavits and Examinations related to that matter be delivered to his Excellency General Washington.") Washington approved mass arrests of suspected Loyalists for the night of June 23–24, and among those arrested was his housekeeper, Mary Smith. Samuel Fraunces also was arrested that night, but eventually released for lack of evidence. Hickey faced a court-martial at Richmond Hill on June 26, was found guilty of mutiny and sedition, and sentenced to death. (Note: The minutes of Thomas Hickey's court-martial contain no testimony by a housekeeper.) Hickey was hanged on June 28. Smith later fled to England, where she received a £20 Loyalist pension from the British government.

In a 1785 petition to Congress, Fraunces swore that he had thwarted an assassination plot against Washington. Regarding an assassination plot, Rice concludes: "There must have been some truth to Fraunces's statement (because it was later validated by a congressional committee)." Regarding the Phoebe Fraunces legend, Rice concludes: "The story has no basis in fact ... Lossing called her 'Phoebe'—Fraunces had no daughter by that name. (Note: "Phoebe Fraunces" does not appear in Samuel Fraunces's will. Fraunces's children are listed variously in the birth, baptism, and death records of Christ Church in Philadelphia or of Trinity Church, New York. "Phoebe Fraunces" does not appear in these records.) Records of Washington's household [at Richmond Hill] do not list any of Fraunces's children as employees."

Elizabeth Thompson, a 72-year-old widow, became Washington's housekeeper at Richmond Hill on July 9, 1776. Rice suggests that confusion created by Thompson's surname may have led Lossing, writing 84 years after the events, to misidentify Fraunces's daughter Elizabeth as Washington's housekeeper: At the time of Hickey's June 1776 hanging, Elizabeth Fraunces was a 10-year-old child. But thirteen years later she married Atcheson Thompson, and became, coincidentally, another Elizabeth Thompson. (Note: "I have Sir—the honour of being personally known to your Excellency, being the Daughter of Mr Fraunces, and one that was so happy as to have offers of friendship from you Soon after your arrival in this place." Eliza. Thompson.)

== In popular culture ==
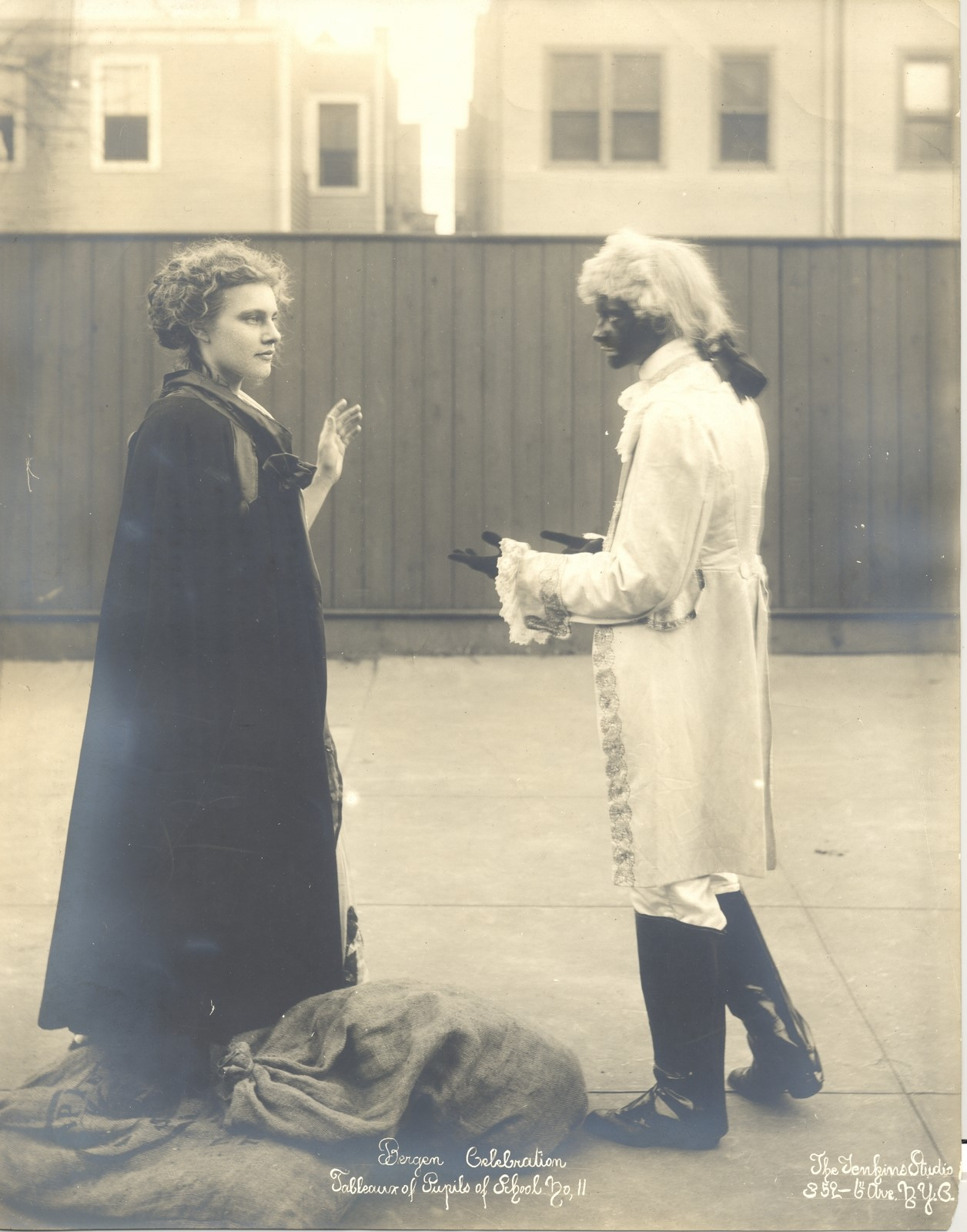
Schoolchildren in 1910 portraying Jane Tuers and Samuel Fraunces, the latter as an African American (using blackface).

- Bergen Celebration, a 1910 historical pageant celebrating the 250th anniversary of the founding of Jersey City. In a reenactment of the Jane Tuers legend, Fraunces was portrayed by a white student in blackface.
- Dinner for the General, a 1953 teleplay by Reginald Lawrence for Hallmark Hall of Fame, Season 2, Episode 2-26, aired on NBC, February 22, 1953—a teenaged Phoebe Fraunces falls desperately in love with Thomas Hickey, and is horrified when she uncovers his plot to poison General Washington.
- Washington's Farewell to His Officers, a 1955 teleplay by Goodman Ace for You Are There, aired on CBS, February 27, 1955—Samuel Fraunces serves a banquet for General Washington and his officers at the end of the Revolutionary War.
- The Ballot and Me, a 1956 play by Langston Hughes, featured a free-black Samuel Fraunces as a character.
- Lossing's Phoebe Fraunces legend was largely forgotten, until it was re-introduced in Judith Berry Griffin's 1977 children's book, Phoebe and the General (later renamed Phoebe the Spy). (Note: Note from Fraunces Tavern Museum: "A sweet book, but one needing some comments. Although the cover calls it a true story, Phoebe and the plate of poisoned peas never existed. Samuel Fraunces had five daughters, but none were named Phoebe. The story of Phoebe Fraunces apparently began in B.J. Lossing's Life of Washington (New York: 1860). Lossing claimed to have heard the story from an unnamed friend of Fraunces.") The fictional 13-year-old Phoebe character is Samuel Fraunces's daughter, and he tells her that he's overheard something about an assassination plot against Washington. Phoebe sees Thomas Hickey sprinkle something on the general's food, and she throws a plate of poisoned peas out the window, where chickens eat them and fall down dead. Hickey is immediately arrested, and Fraunces and Phoebe are commended by General Washington.
- Who Is Carrie? a 1984 historical novel for young adults by Christopher and James Lincoln Collier—Carrie is an enslaved kitchenmaid working for Samuel Fraunces. (Note: In an epilogue to Who Is Carrie? entitled "How Much of This Book Is True?" the Colliers wrote: "Samuel Fraunces is a particularly interesting character. He was generally called "Black Sam" Fraunces during his lifetime, and it has been assumed by some historians that he was a black. However, our research indicates that he was in fact considered white, despite the nickname." (page 157))
- Beyond Harlem, History of Black New York Downtown, a 2005 teleplay by Dara Frazier for NYC Media.
- Shades of War, a 2006 off-Broadway play by Dara Frazier-Harper, portrays Samuel Fraunces as a free-black, ultra-rich, Michael Bloomberg-like character.
- The Book of Negroes, a 2007 novel by Lawrence Hill about the life of slaves during the American Revolution, portrays Samuel Fraunces as a freed mulatto from Jamaica who runs his namesake tavern, participates in historical events, and later moves to Mount Vernon to run George Washington's household.
- Rough Crossings, a 2007 BBC "drama documentary" based on a book by Simon Schama, portrays both Samuel Fraunces and the "fictional" Phoebe Fraunces as free-blacks. It faced criticism on several fronts.
- Fraunces is portrayed by an African-American actor in a 2010 video at the President's House Memorial in Philadelphia.
- Charles L. Blockson, a Philadelphia local historian, wrote a 2013 book on Samuel Fraunces. He cites twentieth-century sources describing Fraunces as "Negro," "coloured", "Haitian Negro," "mulatto", "fastidious old Negro," and "swarthy," and advocates for Samuel Fraunces to be considered a Black Founding Father.
- Black Entertainment Television presented a 2015 miniseries, The Book of Negroes, based on Hill's 2007 novel. African-American actor Cuba Gooding Jr. portrayed Samuel Fraunces.
- Another children's book based on the legend is the 2016 title by C. R. Cole, Ainsley Battles, and Breanna Dubbs: Phebe and the Peas. In this re-telling "Phebe" is identified by the authors (who all claim to be descendants of Samuel Fraunces) as the young Elizabeth Fraunces. The story of the poisoned peas is given as a true family story passed down through the generations.

== Legacy ==
- Fraunces Tavern, at Pearl & Broad Streets in New York City, is a national historic landmark and museum
- Fraunces created a tableau of wax figurines and seashells as a gift for Martha Washington. It survives at Tudor Place, the Washington, D.C. home of her granddaughter.
- A Pennsylvania state historical marker at 2nd & Dock Streets in Philadelphia marks the location of the first tavern Fraunces operated after leaving Washington's presidential household
- On June 26, 2010, St. Peter's Church, Philadelphia honored Fraunces by inscribing his name on an obelisk in the churchyard
