= The Drowning =

The Drowning may refer to:

- The Drowning (video game), a 2013 video game
- The Drowning EP, by Dashboard Confessional
- The Drowning (novel), a 2008 novel by Camilla Läckberg
- The Drowning (film), a 2016 American-Hong Kong thriller drama film directed by Bette Gordon
- The Drowning (TV series), a 2021 British four-part television thriller drama series directed by Carolina Giammetta.

== See also ==
- Drowning (disambiguation)
