= Drown (disambiguation) =

Drowning is respiratory impairment from being in or under a liquid.

Drown may also refer to:

- Drown (short story collection), a short-story collection by Junot Díaz
- Drown (surname), a surname and list of people with the surnames Drown and Drowne
- DROWN attack, a computer security exploit

== Songs ==
- "Drown" (Bring Me the Horizon song), 2014
- "Drown" (Justin Timberlake song), 2024
- "Drown" (Martin Garrix song), 2020
- "Drown" (The Smashing Pumpkins song), 1992
- "Drown" (Theory of a Deadman song), 2014
- "Drown", by 40 Below Summer from Invitation to the Dance
- "Drown", by Blindspott from End the Silence
- "Drown", by Carolina Liar from Wild Blessed Freedom
- "Drown", by Front Porch Step from Aware
- "Drown", by Gravity Kills from Perversion
- "Drown", by Limp Bizkit from Results May Vary
- "Drown", by Son Volt from Trace
- "Drown", by Three Days Grace from the eponymous album
- "Drown", by Tyler Joseph from No Phun Intended

== See also ==
- "Drowned" (song), by The Who
- "Drowned", by Candlebox from Lucy
- Drowning (disambiguation)
