= Drowning (disambiguation) =

Drowning is death by suffocation caused by a liquid that enters the lungs.

Drowning may also refer to:

== Music ==
=== Albums ===
- Drowning EP or the title song, by Lahannya, 2000
- II—Drowning, by Plasma Pool, 1997

=== Songs ===
- "Drowning" (Armin van Buuren song), 2011
- "Drowning" (Backstreet Boys song), 2001
- "Drowning" (Banks song), 2014
- "Drowning" (The Beat song), 1981
- "Drowning" (A Boogie wit da Hoodie song), 2017
- "Drowning" (Chris Young song), 2019
- "Drowning" (Crazy Town song), 2002
- "Drowning" (Hootie & the Blowfish song), 1995
- "Drowning" (Mario song), 2018
- "Drowning (Face Down)", by Saving Abel, 2009
- "Drowning", by Adema from Adema, 2001
- "Drowning", by Arca from Sheep
- "Drowning", by Jay Brannan from In Living Cover, 2009
- "Drowning", by John Entwistle from Mad Dog, 1975
- "Drowning", by Richard Wright from Broken China, 1996
- "Drowning", by Screaming Jets from World Gone Crazy, 1997
- "Drowning", by Six Feet Under from Alive and Dead, 1996
- "Drowning", by Stabbing Westward from Darkest Days, 1998
- "Drowning", by Stereophonics from Pull the Pin, 2007
- "A Drowning", by How to Destroy Angels from How to Destroy Angels, 2010

== Other uses ==
- Drowning (film), a 2020 American film by Melora Walters
- Drowning (play), a 1987 play by María Irene Fornés
- Drowning Fork, a stream in Illinois, US

== See also ==
- The Drowning (disambiguation)
- Drown (disambiguation)
- "Drowned" (song), by the Who
- "Drowned", by Candlebox from Lucy
