= Anglers' Club of New York =

Club in New York City

The Angler's Club of New York is a members club at 101 Broad Street in lower Manhattan, New York City, for people interested in angling. It is adjacent to the Fraunces Tavern. It has EIN as a 501(c)(7) Social and Recreation Clubs entity; in 2024 it claimed total revenue of $989,288 and total assets of $1,161,086.

The club was founded in 1916 and in 1940 was established on the second floor of the adjoining tavern. The club had no external signage denoting its presence when a reporter for the New York Times visited the club in 1975. The food at the club was initially supplied by the Fraunces Tavern, and sent to the club by dumbwaiter. An argument between the two managers of the establishments saw an end to the culinary practice.

An honor medal presented by the Angler's Club was donated by Carl Otto Kretzschmar von Kienbusch to the collection of the New-York Historical Society.

== Membership ==
The total number of members was estimated at 250 in 1975, with 150 members outside New York. The cost of annual membership was $125 in 1975 (equivalent to $748 in 2025). Prominent members have included the United States Presidents Herbert Hoover and Dwight Eisenhower. Hoover's collection of dry flies were "gathering dust but still venerated" in 1975. The financier and conservationist Laurance Rockefeller was a notable member in the 1970s. A member described the club as "a dusty, friendly luncheon club, where the only excitement had been the arguments between the men who fish for trout and the men who go after salmon" to the New York Times reporter John Corry in 1975. The club did not admit women members at the time of the New York Times visit.
