= Bridewell (New York City jail) =

Municipal prison in New York City

Coordinates: 40.71380°N 74.0062°W

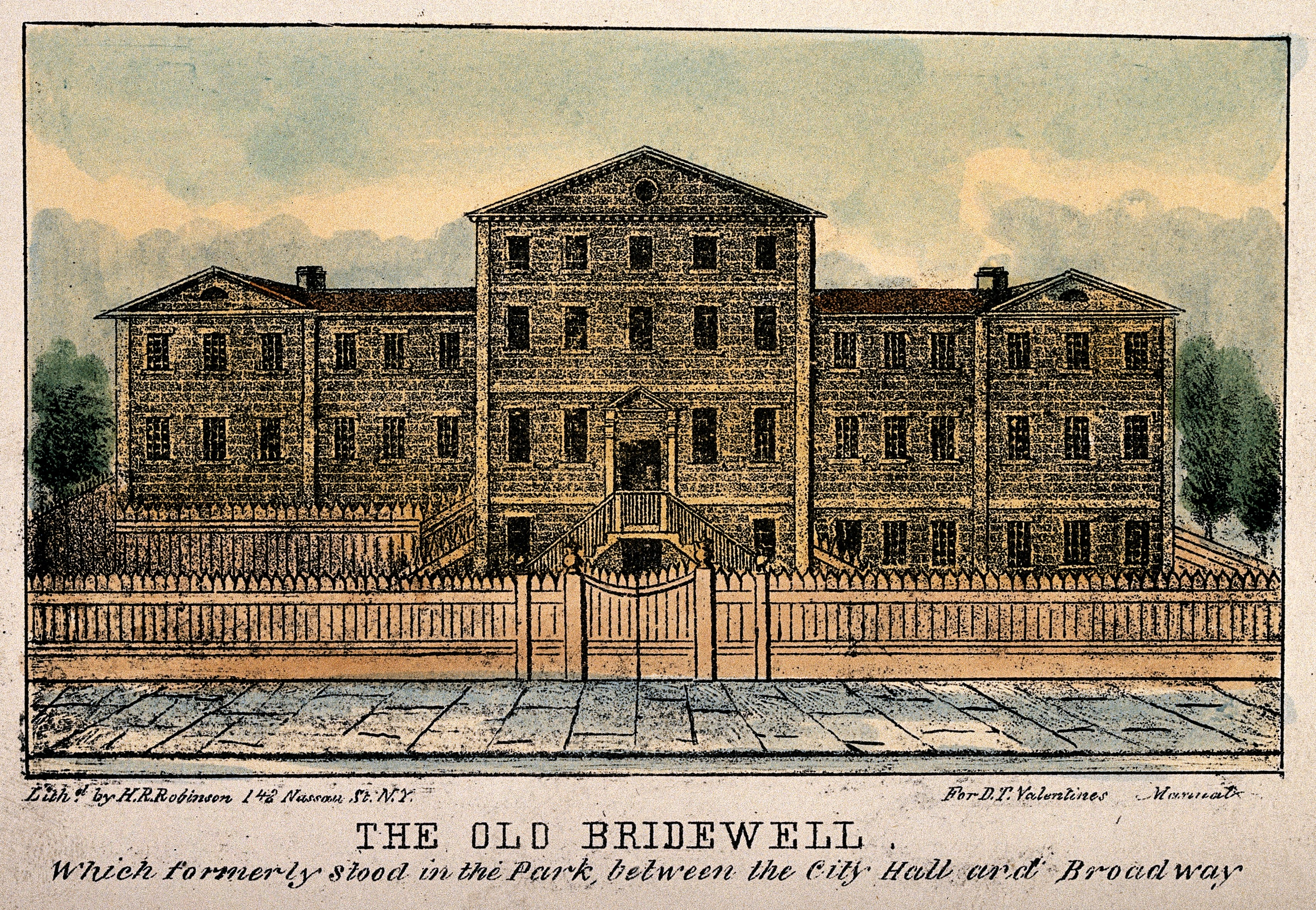
- "The Old Bridewell, which formerly stood in the Park, between the City Hall and Broadway"
- Interactive map of the Bridewell area

General information
- Location: Manhattan, New York City
- Opened: 1768
- Demolished: 1838

The Bridewell was a municipal prison built in 1768 on the site now occupied by City Hall Park in the Civic Center neighborhood of Manhattan, New York City.

== History ==
The name comes from the Bridewell Prison in London, which has been described as “the world’s first attempt at prisoner rehabilitation”. The building was originally Bridewell Palace, built on the banks of the river Thames for Henry VIII and used by him as a main London residence from 1515 to 1523. Subsequently, it became a hospital in 1553 and then a prison mainly for women. Many of these women were transported from Bridewell Prison to the American colonies. Between 1718 and 1775 over 52,000 convicts were transported from the British Isles to America to be sold as laborers; many of these would have come from the original Bridewell Prison. The term became synonymous with "prison", and was used for a number of jails in the Thirteen Colonies.

Construction on the New York City Bridewell began in 1768, although the building was not completed until after the end of the American Revolutionary War. Even though it was incomplete, the British used the jail to house prisoners of war during the Revolutionary War. Prior to British control of New York, the jail in 1776 housed Thomas Hickey prior to his execution in the plot to assassinate George Washington.

It stood until it was replaced by the Tombs in 1838; some of the dressed stone blocks from the Bridewell were used to construct The Tombs.
