= Drowning Fork =

Stream in Illinois, U.S.

Coordinates: 40.513374°N 90.556796°W

Drowning Fork is a stream in the U.S. state of Illinois. It was so named on account of two soldiers who drowned there while crossing at high water.

== See also ==
- List of rivers of Illinois
