= Fraunces Tavern =

Historic building in Manhattan, New York

- Fraunces Tavern Block
- U.S. National Register of Historic Places
- U.S. Historic district
- New York State Register of Historic Places
- New York City Landmark
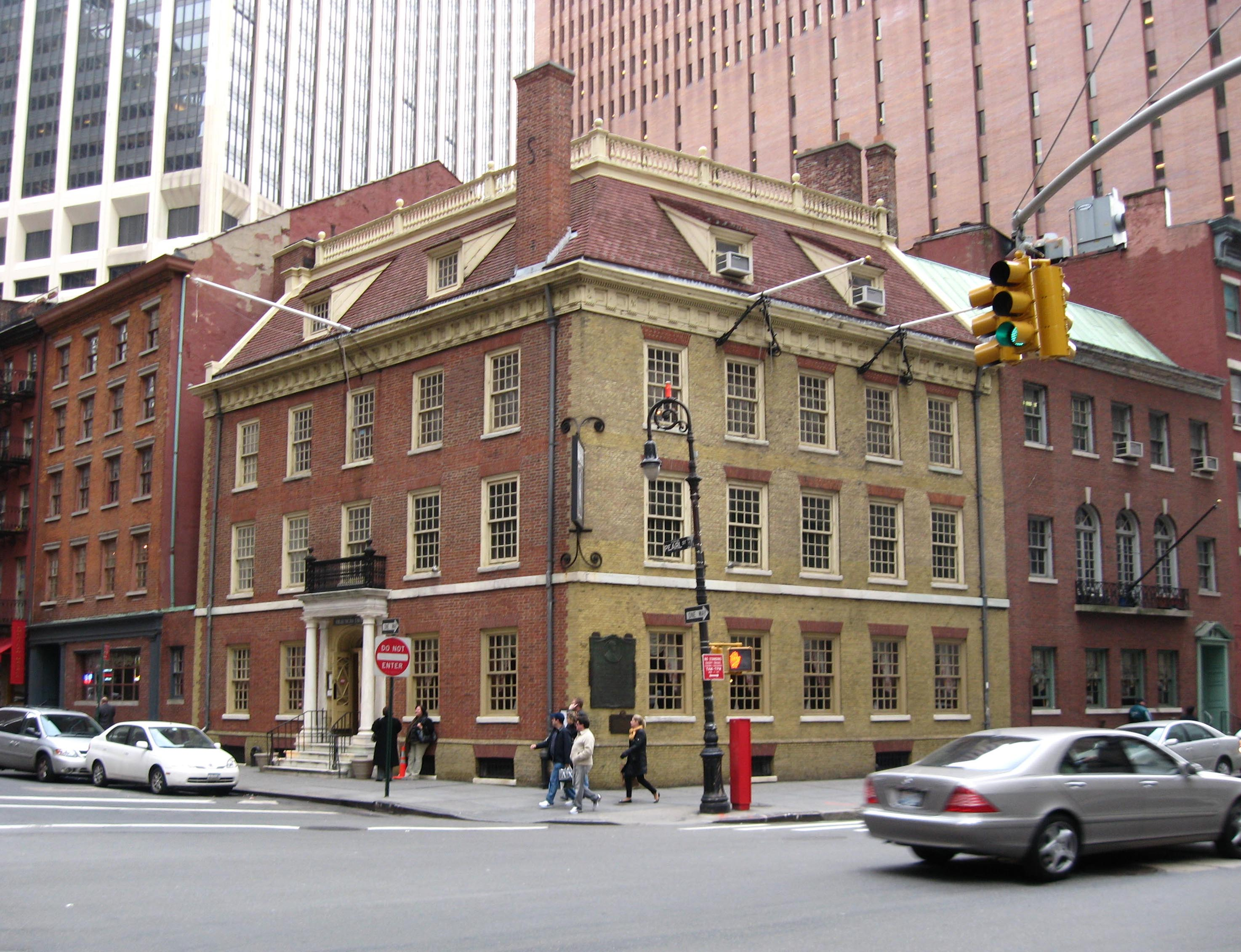
- North and west fronts of Fraunces Tavern on Pearl Street at Broad Street
- Location: Bounded by Pearl Street, Coenties Slip, Water Street and Broad Street, Lower Manhattan, New York City, NY, U.S.
- Built: Various
- Architect: Various
- Architectural style: Various
- NRHP reference No.: 77000957
- NYCL No.: 0994

Significant dates
- Added to NRHP: April 28, 1977
- Designated NYSRHP: June 23, 1980
- Designated NYCL: November 14, 1978

- Fraunces Tavern
- U.S. National Register of Historic Places
- U.S. Historic district – Contributing property
- New York State Register of Historic Places
- New York City Landmark
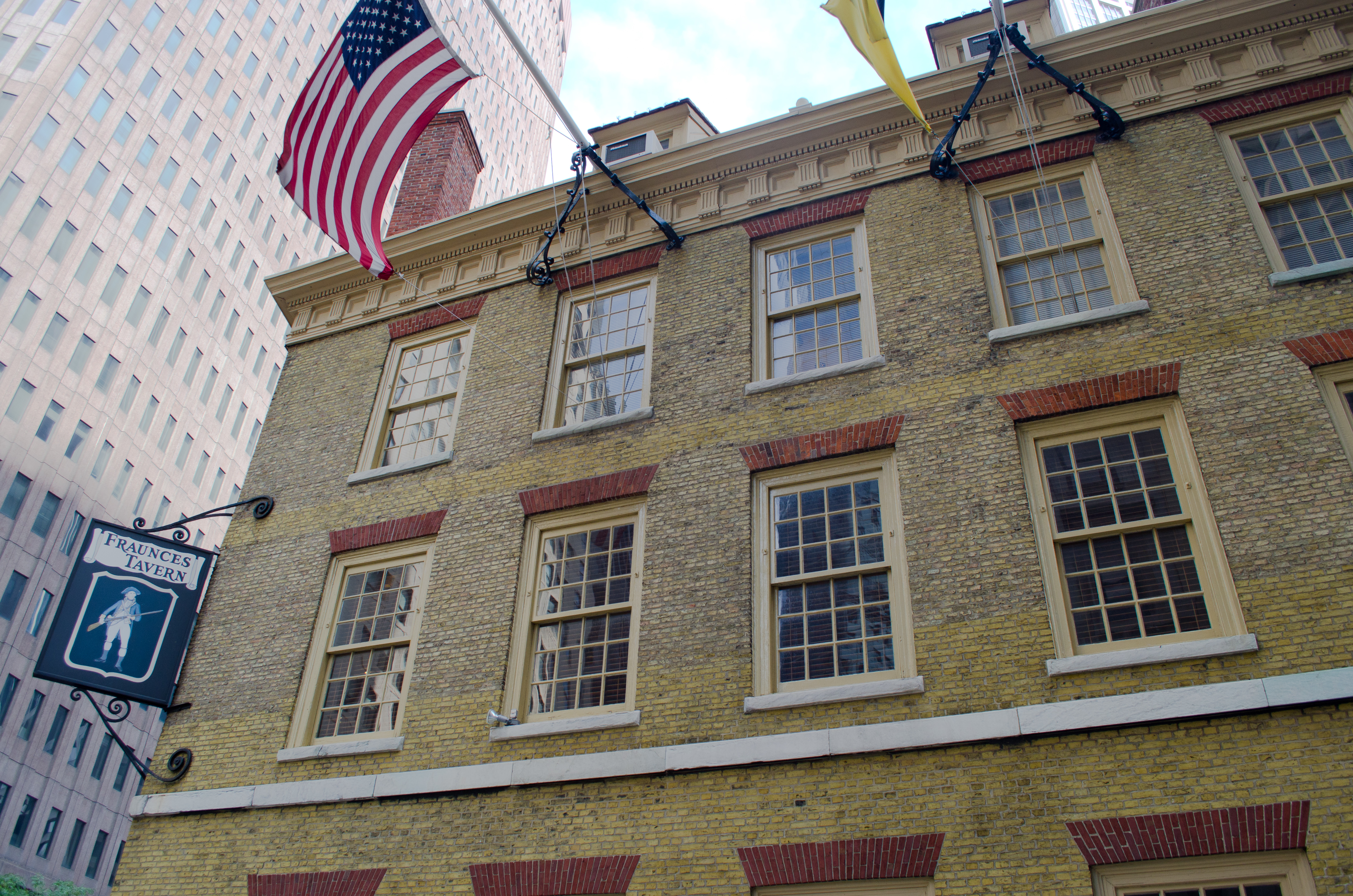
- West front of Fraunces Tavern on Broad Street
- Location: 54 Pearl Street, New York, NY
- Coordinates: 40.7033°N 74.0113°W
- Built: 1719
- Architectural style: Georgian
- Part of: Fraunces Tavern Block (ID77000957)
- NRHP reference No.: 08000140
- NYSRHP No.: 06101.000129
- NYCL No.: 0030

Significant dates
- Added to NRHP: March 6, 2008
- Designated NYSRHP: January 15, 2008
- Designated NYCL: November 23, 1965

Fraunces Tavern is a museum, bar and restaurant in New York City, situated at 54 Pearl Street at the corner of Pearl and Broad Streets in the Financial District of Lower Manhattan. Fraunces Tavern played a prominent role in history before, during, and after the American Revolution. Before the war, Fraunces Tavern served as a meeting place for the Sons of Liberty; as the British Army prepared to evacuate New York City, it was the site for proceedings known as "The Birch Trials" (the culminating event in the emancipation of thousands of Black Loyalists - one of the largest emancipations of Black people prior to the American Civil War); once the British Army left, it was the site where, in late 1783, General George Washington was honored at a banquet celebrating the British Army evacuation and, days later, where Washington bid farewell to his officers. Later, when the United States capital was located in New York City, Fraunces Tavern was rented in 1785-1788 by the Congress of the Confederation to house the departments of Foreign Affairs and War, and offices of the Board of Treasury – serving, in essence, as the Nation's first executive office building.

Fraunces Tavern has been owned since 1904 by Sons of the Revolution in the State of New York Inc., which carried out a meticulous restoration between 1904 and 1907 to preserve what is today the oldest surviving building in Manhattan. A museum on the premises interprets the history of the American Revolutionary era, including the Fraunces Tavern building and its history, along with exhibitions of furnishings, communications, documents, personal artifacts and artworks. The building is visited by thousands of domestic and international tourists and school children annually. The tavern is a tourist site and a part of the NYC Revolutionary Trail, New York Freedom Trail, and the American Whiskey Trail. It is listed on the National Register of Historic Places and is a New York City designated landmark. In addition, the block on which Fraunces Tavern is located is a National Historic Landmark District and a New York City designated landmark district.

== Early history ==
=== Pre-Revolutionary history ===
Stephanus van Cortlandt was first granted a water lot on November 19, 1686, which was filled in with landfill. He then retired in 1700 to his manor on the Hudson River and gave the property to his son-in-law, Étienne "Stephen" DeLancey, a French Huguenot who had married van Cortlandt's daughter, Anne. The DeLancey family contended with the Livingston family for leadership of the Province of New York.

DeLancey built the current building as a house in 1719. The small yellow bricks used in its construction were imported from the Dutch Republic and the sizable mansion ranked highly in the province for its quality. The firm Delancey, Robinson & Co., composed of Stephen De Lancey's son Oliver De Lancey, Beverley Robinson, and James Parker, sold the building in 1762 to Samuel Fraunces, who converted the home into a popular tavern, originally named for Queen Charlotte (Queen's Head Tavern).

Before the American Revolution, the building was one of the meeting places of the New York Liberty Boys/Sons of Liberty. During the tea crisis caused by the British Parliament's passage of the Tea Act 1773, the Patriots forced a British naval captain who tried to bring tea to New York to give a public apology at the building. The Patriots, disguised as American Indians (like those of the Boston Tea Party), then dumped the ship's tea cargo into New York Harbor, in the New York Tea Party.

In 1768, the New York Chamber of Commerce was founded at a meeting in the building. Saint George's Society, a benevolent society to support Englishmen in distress, was founded at Fraunces Tavern on Saint George's Day, April 23, 1770. On June 13, 1771, King George III of Great Britain granted a royal charter to establish "The Society of the New York Hospital in the City of New York in America" and a Board of Governors for the "reception of such patients as require medical treatment, chirurgical management and maniacs". The first regular meeting of the Board of Governors of what is now known as New York-Presbyterian Hospital was held at Fraunces Tavern on July 24, 1771.

=== American Revolution ===
In August 1775, Americans, principally the "Hearts of Oak" – a student militia of King's College (now Columbia University), of which Alexander Hamilton was a member – took possession of cannons from the artillery battery at the southernmost point of Manhattan and fired on the British warship Asia. The British Royal Navy ship retaliated by firing a 32-gun broadside on the city, sending a cannonball through the roof of Fraunces Tavern.

Many Revolutionary luminaries met and dined at Fraunces Tavern. Paul Revere ate with John Lamb in 1774, as evidenced by a letter dated March 28, 1774, in which he asked John Lamb to convey his compliments to New York City Sons of Liberty with whom he had dined. When General Washington first arrived in New York City on April 13, 1776, he dined at Fraunces Tavern, knowing the tavern supported the patriot cause. In May and June 1776, General George Washington attended meetings and a banquet of the New York Provincial Congress.

In September 1780, Jane Tuers, a local farmer from across the Hudson River in Bergen Township, New Jersey (now Jersey City), stopped at the tavern while selling her goods and spoke with Samuel Fraunces. He informed Tuers that British soldiers had been in the tavern toasting American General Benedict Arnold, who was involved in a conspiracy to betray the Continental Army and deliver the fortress at West Point to the British. Tuers returned to Bergen later that day and informed her brother Daniel Van Reypen about the conspiracy. Van Reypen rode to Hackensack, New Jersey to report this information to General Anthony Wayne, who then sent Van Reypen to inform General Washington of the conspiracy. The information provided by Tuers confirmed what Washington had suspected of Arnold and led to the arrest, trial, conviction and hanging of co-conspirator John André for treason, which terminated the plot to surrender West Point. Arnold later defected to the British to escape prosecution.

==== The Birch Trials ====
When the war was all but won, Fraunces Tavern was the site of "British-American Board of Inquiry" meetings, otherwise known as "The Birch Trials," which reviewed the legitimacy of claims of former slaves who fought with the British which would allow them to leave with the British, resulting in their freedom. Led by Brigadier General Samuel Birch, American and British representatives reviewed the evidence and testimonies given by Black Loyalists every Wednesday from May to August 1783. American and British representatives determined those black Loyalists who could retain their liberty and be evacuated with the "Redcoats" when they left. It was among the largest emancipations of enslaved Black people in the United States before the Civil War. It is reasonable to conclude that the materials gathered, and discussions had at Fraunces Tavern, were used to assemble the Book of Negroes.

==== Evacuation Day Banquet in New York ====
On November 25, 1783, New York Governor George Clinton hosted a celebration at Fraunces Tavern in honor of General George Washington and his officers with over one hundred guests in attendance. A series of thirteen toasts were given to honor the United States of America, her allies, those who had given their life, and her armies.

==== Washington's farewell to his officers ====
"Washington's Farewell to His Officers"
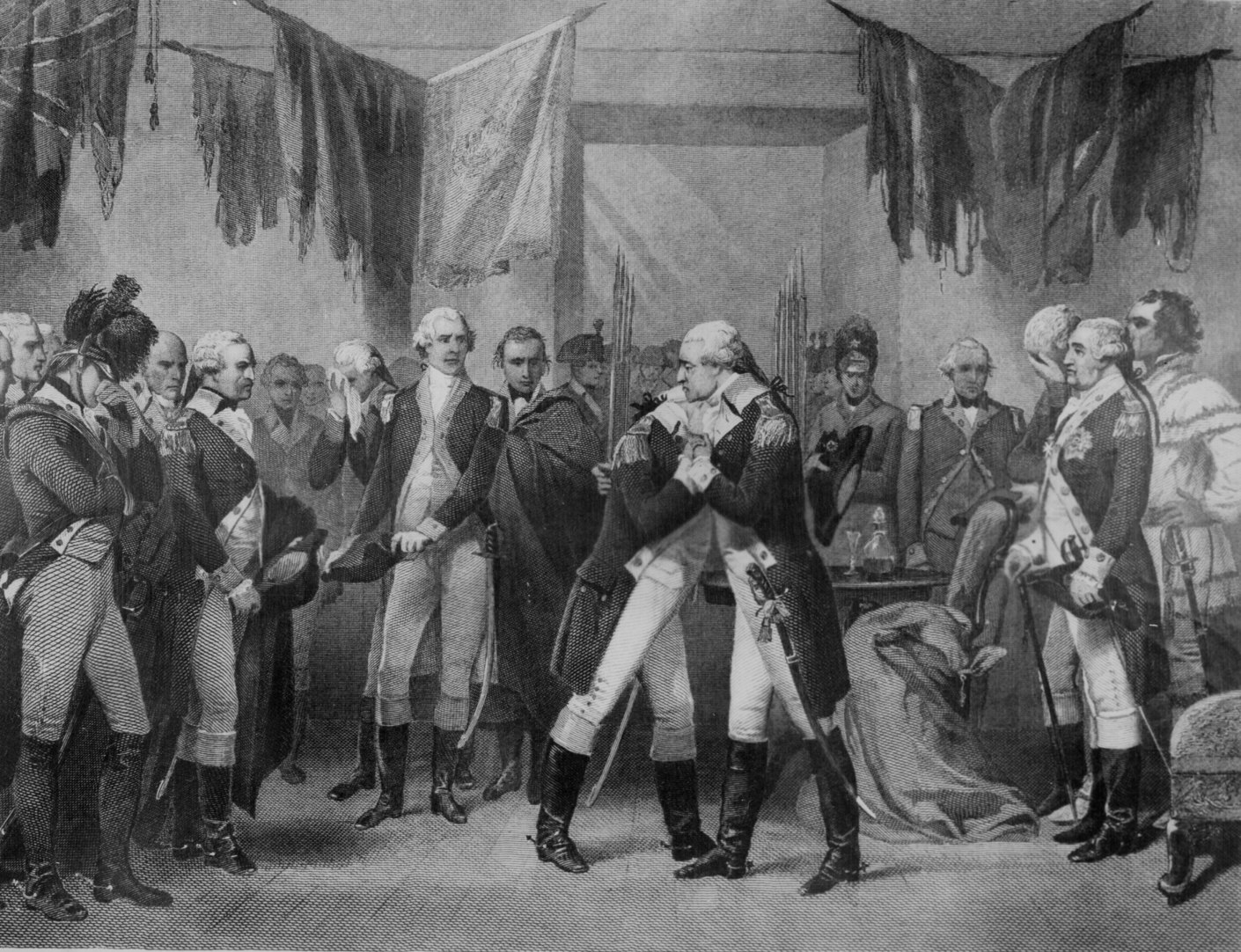
- Engraving after painting by Alonzo Chappel
- Date: December 4, 1783
- Location: Fraunces Tavern, Broad and Pearl Streets, New York Town

On December 4, 1783, nine days after British troops had evacuated New York on November 25, 1783, the tavern hosted General George Washington and his officers, in the building's Long Room, where he bade farewell to his officers of the Continental Army by saying "[w]ith a heart full of love and gratitude, I now take leave of you. I most devoutly wish that your latter days may be as prosperous and happy as your former ones have been glorious and honorable." After his farewell, he took each one of his officers by the hand for a personal word. General Henry Knox, Thomas Paine, Baron von Steuben and Alexander McDougall were among those present at Washington's farewell dinner, and is described both in contemporaneous newspapers and later in the memoir of Colonel Benjamin Tallmadge, who was also in attendance.

=== Post-Revolution ===
In January 1785, New York City became the seat of the Confederation Congress, the nation's central government under the "Articles of Confederation and Perpetual Union." The departments of Foreign Affairs and War, and offices of the Board of Treasury, or Finance, had their offices at Fraunces Tavern from 1775-1788.

With the ratification of the United States Constitution in March 1789, the Confederation Congress's departments became federal departments, and New York City became the first official national capital. The inauguration of George Washington as first President of the United States took place in April 1789. Under the July 1789 Residence Act, Congress moved the national capital to Philadelphia, Pennsylvania for a 10-year period while the permanent national capital was under construction in what is now Washington, D.C. The federal departments vacated their offices in the building and moved to Philadelphia in 1790.

== 19th and 20th centuries ==
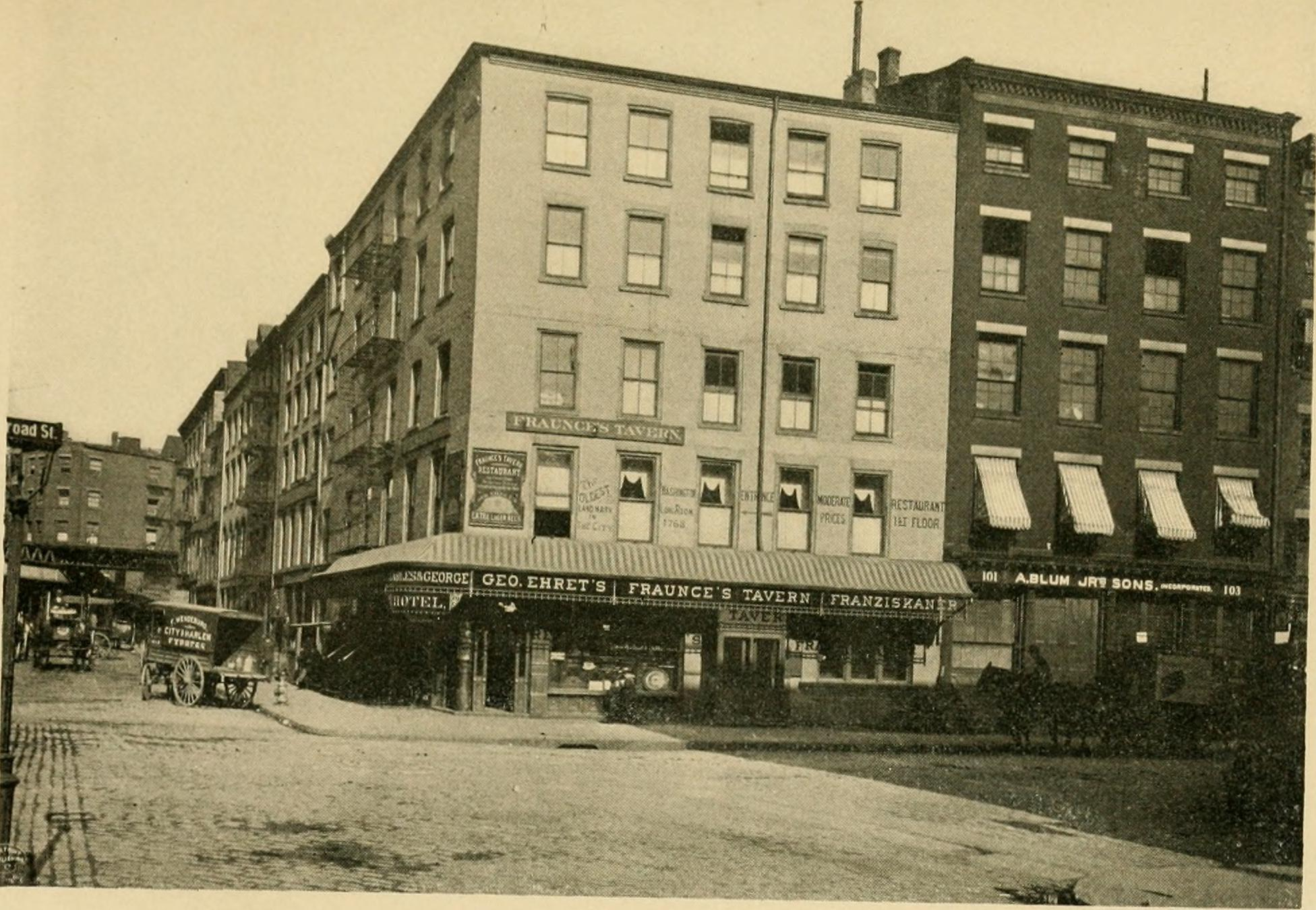
Fraunces Tavern, between the 1890 alteration and the 1900 restoration

Throughout the 1800s, 54 Pearl Street changed owners several times and was run predominantly as a boarding house with a bar on the first floor. The building, however, continued to be recognized as the Fraunces Tavern. Subsequent proprietors would affix signs to the masonry stating Fraunces Tavern. On July 4, 1804, under the management of David Ross, the Society of Cincinnati held a meeting at the tavern. Aaron Burr and Alexander Hamilton attended this meeting of the Society, to which they both belonged, which was held a week before their duel. The building was damaged, but not destroyed, by several fires beginning in 1832. In 1883, Sons of the Revolution was founded in the Long Room on the centenary of Washington's farewell speech.

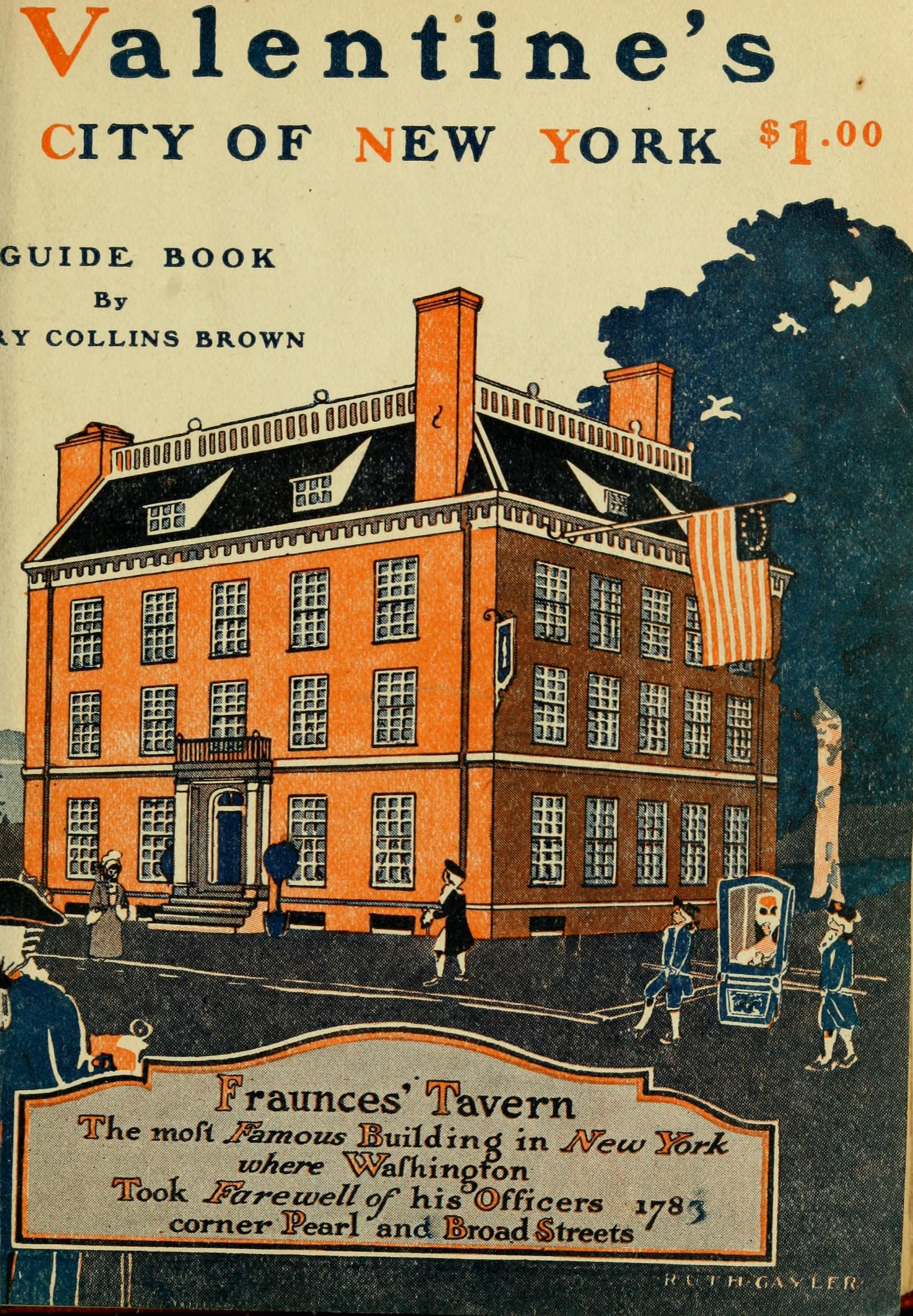
Valentine's City of New York guide book (1920) by Henry Collins Brown featured the tavern on the cover

=== Restoration ===
In 1900, the tavern was slated for demolition by its owners. Members of the New York City Chapter and Mary Washington Colonial Chapter, Daughters of the American Revolution, worked to preserve it, and convinced New York state government leaders to use their power of eminent domain and designate the building as a park (which was the only clause of the municipal ordinances that could be used for protection, as laws were not in place at the time for the subject of "historic preservation," then in its infancy). The temporary designation was later rescinded when the property was acquired in 1904 by the Sons of the Revolution In the State of New York Inc., primarily with funds willed by Frederick Samuel Tallmadge, the grandson of Benjamin Tallmadge, George Washington's chief of intelligence during the Revolution (a plaque depicting Tallmadge is affixed to the building) and leader of the Culper Spy Ring.

An extensive and extremely sensitive restoration was completed in 1907 under the supervision of early historic preservation architect William Mersereau whose work can be seen in other notable buildings including Westover Historic District in Virginia. This architect preserved and stabilized the original architectural elements and materials of Fraunces Tavern from 1719. At the same time, he removed what had been added by subsequent building owners. This is evidenced by materials saved by Mersereau, including wood fragments, dust, and paint samples, as well as personal letters that outline his sensitive approach to the building's restoration. These items and letters are preserved in the Museum's archives.

Mersereau's vision of the restoration was to maintain as much historical accuracy as feasible. His vision foresaw the historic preservation movement by decades. Mersereau outlined his methodology and the rationale for the choices he made within the press. Montgomery Schuyler wrote in the Architectural Record, "recent operations in the interior uncovered instructive structural facts, the slope of the roof of the original mansion, the size and shape of the old brick and what was left of the construction of the Long Room." A guidebook of the era called the tavern "the most famous building in New York."

During the 1960s, Fraunces Tavern was being considered for landmark status. At that time, architectural critic Ada Louise Huxtable described the tavern as "built in 1907 virtually from scratch," adding "it is not old, not authentic, and not preservation" in an article dated May 9, 1965, in The New York Times. Huxtable, however, made this claim without onsite analysis or verification. On June 6, 1965, the New York Times published a letter to the editor that refuted her claims. It stated that "much more of the original structure was standing than Mrs. Huxtable's 'virtually from scratch' would indicate." Huxtable responded, highlighting the changes made to the building since 1719 and asserting that "a spectator standing respectfully in front of the Fraunces Tavern sees nothing that was built in the 18^{th} century." Huxtable's statements are in conflict with the subsequent findings of the New York City Landmarks Preservation Commission in its November 23, 1965, approval of Fraunces Tavern's landmark designation.

In 2000, Randall Gabrielan, a historian of Monmouth County, New Jersey, wrote that "Mersereau claimed his remodeling of Fraunces Tavern was faithful to the original, but the design was controversial in his time. There was no argument over removing the upper stories, which were known to have been added during the building's 19th-century commercial use, but adding the hipped roof was questioned. He used the Philipse Manor House in Yonkers, New York as a style guide and claimed to follow the roof line of the original, as found during construction, traced on the bricks of an adjoining building." Architects Norval White and Elliot Wilensky wrote in 2000 that the building was "a highly conjectural reconstruction – not a restoration – based on 'typical' buildings of 'the period,' parts of remaining walls, and a lot of guesswork."

Despite Huxtable's critique, the New York City Landmarks Preservation Commission held a hearing on Fraunces Tavern's landmark status which took place on October 19, 1965; Fraunces Tavern was declared a landmark on November 23, 1965. In its recording of the designation, the Commission quoted from Montgomery Schuyler's 1908 review highlighting the original building materials and wrote "the restored Fraunces Tavern represented one of the early restorations of New York City preserving one of the few notable 18th century buildings in the City." The National Park Service added the surrounding city block to the National Register of Historic Places (NRHP) on April 28, 1977, as a Historic District by the City of New York on November 14, 1978, and the building was added to the NRHP on March 6, 2008.

However, due to the continued conjecture, Fraunces Tavern Museum undertook an onsite professional examination and analysis in 2021. The report revealed there is more of the original fabric and materials still in the structure than was previously thought. It was observed that the bricks above the original line were entirely different in measurement from the bricks below the line, which supports that Mersereau identified and restored the original roof line after plaster was removed from the building's south wall. The report also concluded that original masonry exists on the building's facade from the 1719 structure. This includes large sections of the yellow Dutch bricks and three red-brick jack arches. The exterior wall of yellow Dutch bricks is the sole surviving such exterior in New York City from the seventeenth and early eighteenth-century. The red brick on the Broad Street side is also original and represents one of the first documented and oldest surviving uses of the red English brick in New York City. The Long Room remains in its original location with the ceilings and walls still intact. Original beams can be observed in exposed areas of the basement; it is clear that original material remains behind the interior walls of the building.

Given the tavern's landmark status and subsequent analysis, the previous criticism is in conflict with the findings of the New York City Landmarks Preservation Commission and the National Park Service as well as the 2021 professional examination.

=== 1975 bombing ===
Fraunces Tavern bombing
- Location: 40°42′12.2″N 74°0′40.75″W; Manhattan, New York, U.S.
- Date: January 24, 1975
- Attack type: bombing
- Weapon: bomb
- Deaths: 4
- Injuries: 50+
- Perpetrator: FALN

A bomb planted in the entrance vestibule of the Anglers' Club of New York at 101 Broad Street, adjacent to Fraunces Tavern, exploded on January 24, 1975, killing four people and injuring more than 50 others. The Puerto Rican clandestine paramilitary organization Fuerzas Armadas de Liberación Nacional Puertorriqueña (Armed Forces of Puerto Rican National Liberation, or FALN), which had executed other bomb incidents in New York in the 1970s, claimed responsibility. No one has been prosecuted for the bombing as of 2026.

In a note police found in a phone booth nearby, the FALN wrote, "we ... take full responsibility for the especially detornated (sic) bomb that exploded today at Fraunces Tavern, with reactionary corporate executives inside." The note claimed the bomb – roughly 10 pounds of dynamite that had been crammed into an attaché case and slipped into the tavern's entrance hallway – was retaliation for the "CIA ordered bomb" that killed three and injured 11 in a restaurant in Mayagüez, Puerto Rico, two weeks earlier.

== Recent uses ==
Fraunces Tavern Museum
- Established: December 4, 1907
- Location: 54 Pearl Street, New York, NY
- Visitors: 25,000
- Owners: Sons of the Revolution in the State of New York, Inc.
- Public transit access: Bus: M15; Subway: at Wall Street, at South Ferry/Whitehall Street
- Website: frauncestavernmuseum.org

Since it was restored in 1907, the Fraunces Tavern building has included a museum, bar and restaurant. Today, the Fraunces Tavern complex includes five interconnected buildings with the Museum located on the upper floors and the bar and restaurant located on the lower floors.

Fraunces Tavern Museum's mission is to preserve and interpret the history of the American Revolutionary era through public education. This mission is fulfilled through the interpretation and preservation of the Museum's collections, landmarked buildings, and varied public programs that serve the community. Visitors can explore galleries and exhibitions focusing on America's War for Independence and the preservation of early American history The Museum's 8,000-piece object collection consists of furnishings, communications, documents, personal artifacts, and art. While a fraction of the collection is on display at any given time, a significant portion of the collection is available to view on the Museum's website.

The Museum's permanent collection includes artifacts from the time of the American Revolution, such as artwork and letters. Permanent exhibitions include The Long Room, The Birch Trials, Governing the Nation, as well as a replica of a lodging room and dining room from Fraunces Tavern's time as a boarding house. Special exhibitions include Path to Liberty: The Emergence of a Nation, Path to Liberty: The War Reimagined, and Path to Liberty: Orders, Discipline and Daily Life.

Public education and programming are essential to the Museum's mission. The Museum has a lineup of speakers, walking tours, music programs, and more. Programs engage the community on everything Revolutionary, with special programming celebrating the 250th anniversary of the United States. The School Program brings thousands of students in the Museum for lessons and activities that bring the American Revolution to life. Additional educational resources available online support educators and are designed in line with the New York State Standards for 4th grade Social Studies.

Fraunces Tavern Bar and Restaurant consists of eight different rooms (including a whiskey lounge and a piano bar) on the lower floors of the now five-building complex that accommodate both public dining and private events with an extensive food and drink menu and a rotating lineup of live music performers.

== Gallery ==
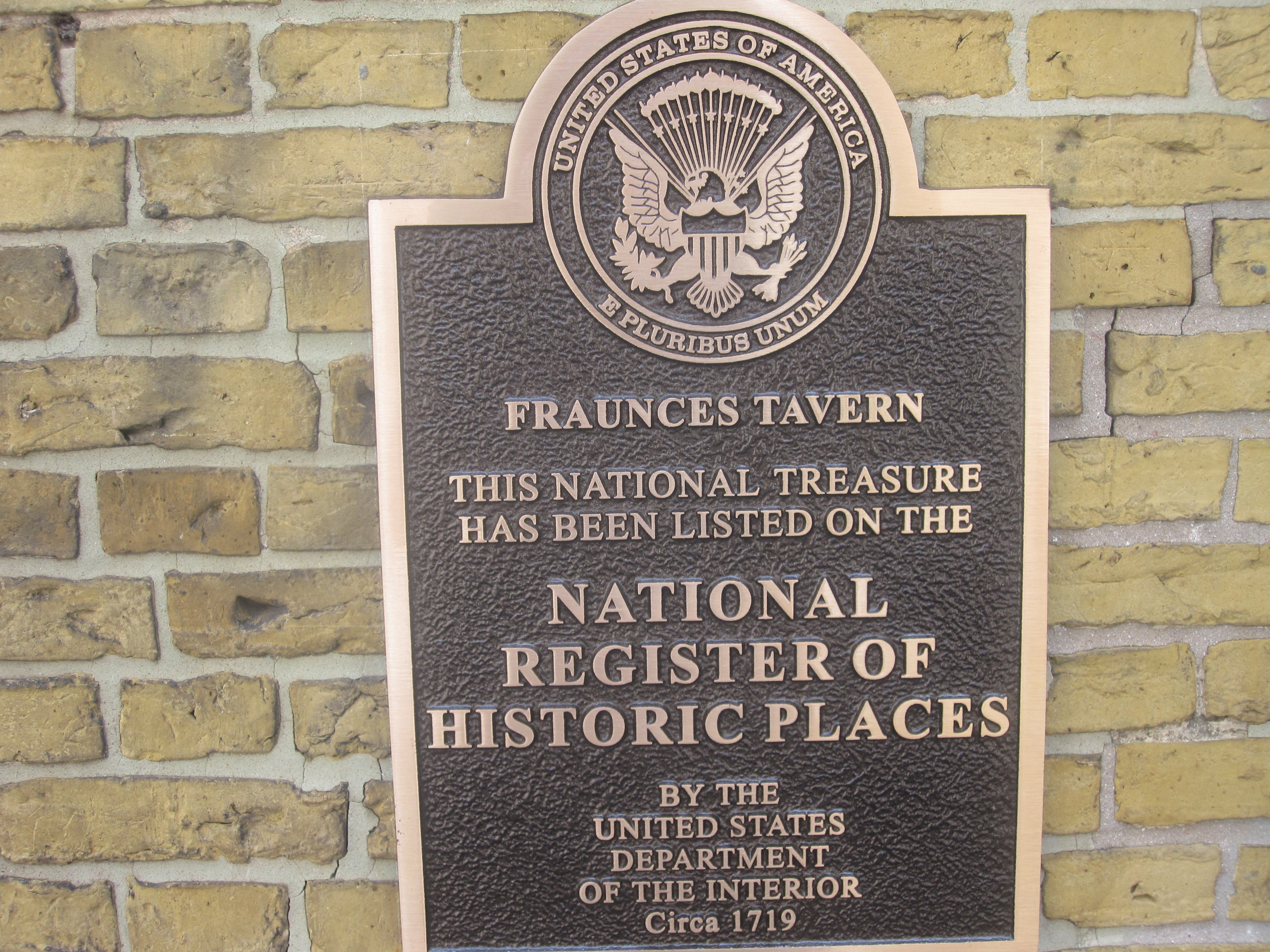
National Register of Historic Places marker of U.S. Dept. of the Interior

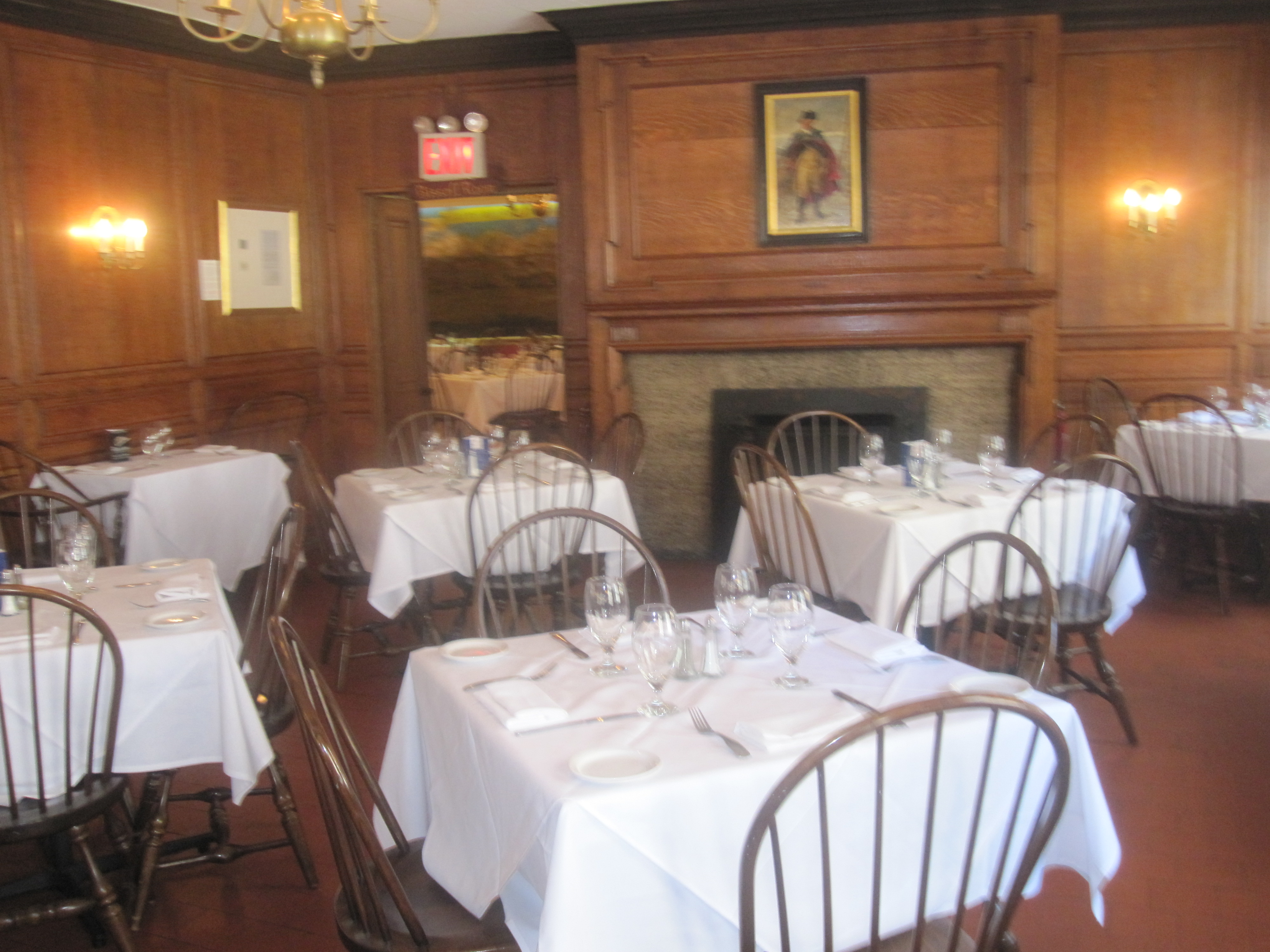
Dining room at Fraunces Tavern

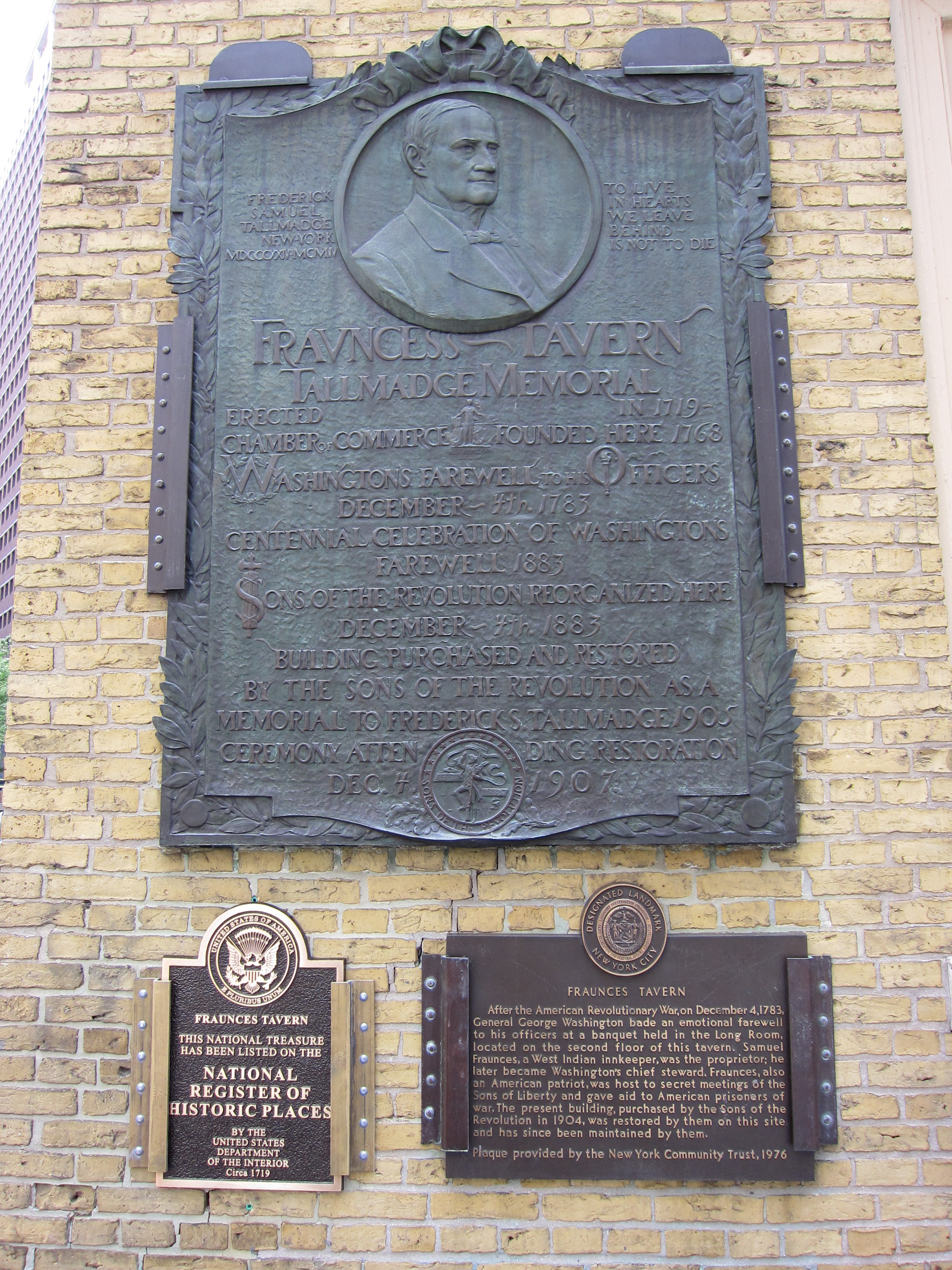
Plaques at Fraunces Tavern

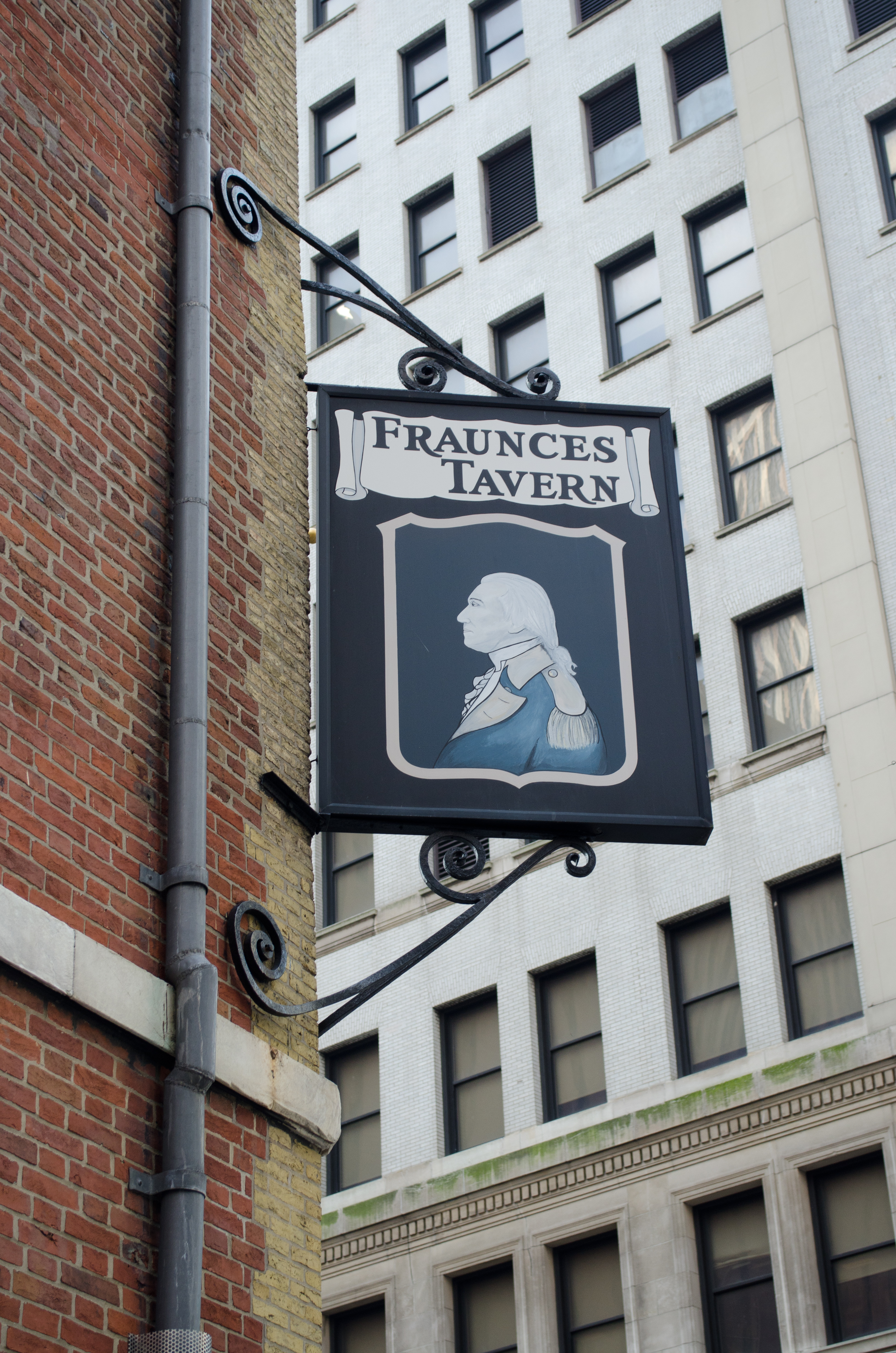
Fraunces Tavern sign

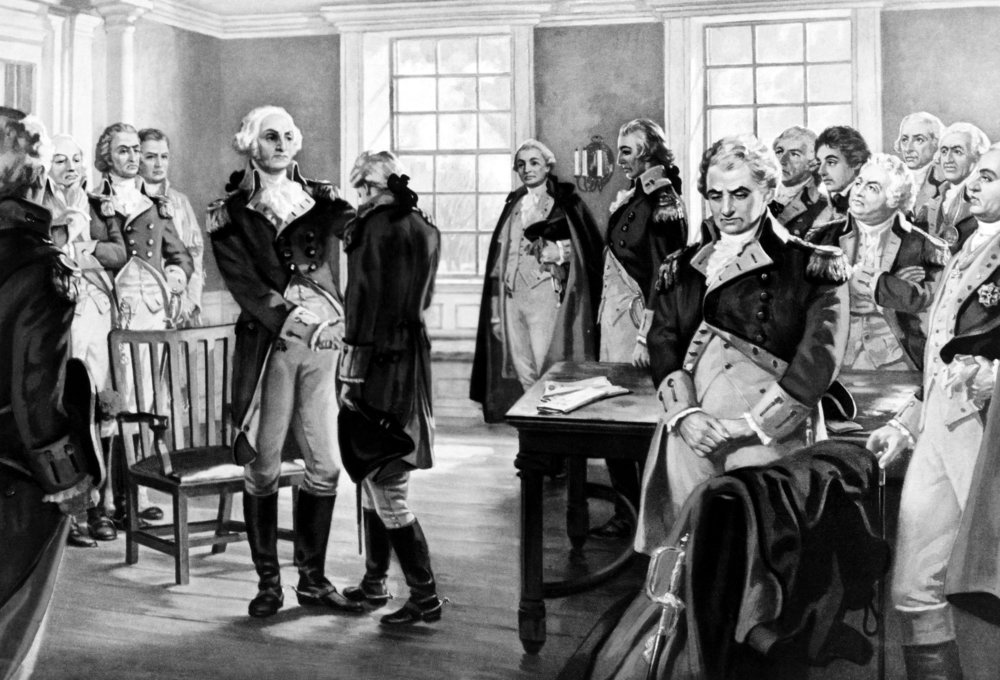
George Washington says farewell to his troops at Fraunces Tavern, New York, 1783 by Henry Hintermeister

== See also ==
- List of the oldest restaurants in the United States
- List of National Historic Landmarks in New York City
- List of New York City Designated Landmarks in Manhattan below 14th Street
- National Register of Historic Places listings in Manhattan below 14th Street
- List of the oldest buildings in New York
