= The Book of Negroes (miniseries) =

Television series

- Genre: Drama
- Based on: The Book of Negroes by Lawrence Hill
- Screenplay by: Clement Virgo; Lawrence Hill
- Directed by: Clement Virgo
- Starring: Aunjanue Ellis; Kyle M. Hamilton; Lyriq Bent; Cuba Gooding Jr. Louis Gossett Jr. Ben Chaplin; Allan Hawco; Greg Bryk; Jane Alexander
- Music by: Phillip Miller
- Country of origin: Canada
- Original language: English
- No. of episodes: 6

Production
- Producers: Damon D'Oliveira; Clement Virgo
- Cinematography: Giulio Biccari
- Editors: Susan Shipton; Kye Meechan

Original release
- Network: CBC; BET
- Release: January 7 – February 11, 2015

The Book of Negroes is a 2015 Canadian historical drama television miniseries directed by Clement Virgo, adapted by Virgo and Lawrence Hill from the latter’s 2007 novel of the same name. It stars Aunjanue Ellis-Taylor, Lyriq Bent, Cuba Gooding Jr., Louis Gossett Jr., Ben Chaplin, Allan Hawco, Greg Bryk, and Jane Alexander. It originally aired in six installments on CBC in Canada on January 7, 2015, and on BET in the United States on February 16.

The story was inspired by the British freeing and evacuation of former slaves, known as Black Loyalists, who had left rebel masters during the American Revolutionary War. The British transported some 3,000 Black Loyalists to Nova Scotia for resettlement, documenting their names in what was called the Book of Negroes. The series explores the life of a fictional woman included in this resettlement. She had been taken captive as a girl in West Africa and sold into slavery, held first in South Carolina. She escaped to British lines in New York City, where she was freed and ultimately evacuated to Nova Scotia.

On initial airing, The Book of Negroes was the CBC’s highest-rated original drama program since Road to Avonlea in 1990. It received positive reviews from critics, and won eleven Canadian Screen Awards, including for Best Dramatic Miniseries or TV Movie.

== Synopsis ==
In 1761, eleven-year-old Aminata Diallo is abducted and taken captive from her village in West Africa by agents of the V.O.C., a Dutch trading company. She meets another boy from her region, Chekura, who is working for the slavers but reveals he was sold into slavery by his uncle. She and Chekura are transported by ship to be sold into slavery in South Carolina, US, where the two are separated and she is forced to work on an indigo plantation. Chekura later returns to her and the pair get married. Their baby is abducted and sold by Aminata's jealous slave master, Robinson Appleby. Aminata later tries to find her child and vows to return one day to her homeland.

Solomon Lindo, a sympathetic indigo inspector, buys Aminata from Appleby and takes her to New York, where she escapes to British lines as they control the city.

Amidst the American Revolutionary War, she is recruited by Sir John Clarkson to help register names of Black Loyalists in a ledger known as The Book of Negroes. It was a record of former slaves whom the British freed after they fled rebel masters and was prepared prior to their promised evacuation of Loyalists from the city to Nova Scotia after Britain's defeat in the war. They resettled Black Loyalists in the colony, granting them land.

Separated from her husband, Aminata encounters more hardship in Nova Scotia. The climate is harsh and tensions flare between the white and black communities over the scarcity of work, breaking out in the Shelburne Riots. Aminata successfully petitions British abolitionists, who organize passage from Nova Scotia to the new colony of Freetown (Sierra Leone) in West Africa for nearly 1,300 former slaves. With this voyage, Aminata returns to the continent of her homeland.

== Events ==
As mentioned above, the novel is based on the historical document, the Book of Negroes, and related events of the period. Aminata is said to be Muslim, as were some slaves taken from West Africa; others followed indigenous religions. The history of Islam in Niger provides some context to this.

When the Patriots won the American Revolutionary War, many Loyalists, decided to leave the former Thirteen Colonies. Some had already lost property to rebel confiscation and been subject to persecution and attacks. The Crown promised them land grants in Nova Scotia and other British colonies; some Loyalists went to Jamaica. Tens of thousands of these refugees came through New York City, where their evacuation was processed by the British Army, leading up to Evacuation Day on 25 November 1783. The Book of Negroes was created to document the former slaves who were eligible to leave; it was assembled by Samuel Birch, the namesake of Birchtown, Nova Scotia, under the direction of Guy Carleton, 1st Baron Dorchester. (For more background, see Dunmore's Proclamation, a 1775 promise by the royal governor of the British Colony of Virginia to grant emancipation (freedom) to slaves who left rebel masters and joined the Crown's forces.)

The writers of the series based Aminata's first owner, Appleby, on a business partner of Henry Laurens, who headed one of the largest slave trading companies in the Thirteen Colonies. Solomon Lindo, the Jewish indigo inspector, was an ancestor of Chris Blackwell (born 1937), the British-Jamaican founder of Island Records. "Daddy Moses" was Moses Wilkinson. One of Aminata's supporters in New York Town is presented as Samuel Fraunces, owner of the historic Fraunces Tavern.

The naval officer who helped the Black Loyalist community in Nova Scotia was John Clarkson, younger brother of the more well-known Thomas, one of the central figures in the abolition of slavery in England and the British Empire. Given the difficulties of former slaves in London and Nova Scotia, Thomas Clarkson and William Wilberforce, along with other members of the Society for Effecting the Abolition of the Slave Trade, had incorporated the Sierra Leone Company, to resettle some of these Black Loyalists in a new colony in West Africa.

Lieutenant Clarkson's charge in Nova Scotia was to find volunteers for this resettlement. He worked with Thomas Peters, among other Black Loyalists. Together they gathered a group of close to 1,200 who wanted to leave for what they hoped were better opportunities in Sierra Leone. After a harrowing transatlantic passage, the flotilla of 15 ships arrived at the colony's port in March 1792. This group, who became known as the Nova Scotian Settlers, established Freetown, the capital city.

Aminata's journey to London and publication of her memoir have precedents in the life stories, known as slave narratives, of such men as Ignatius Sancho and Olaudah Equiano. Her daughter's time in London as a domestic worker was based on the history of the Black Poor.

== Development and production ==
The series was adapted from Hill's novel, named the Book of Negroes after the historical document recording names and descriptions of 3,000 African-American slaves who had escaped to the British lines during the American Revolution, were freed, and were to be evacuated by the British by ship to points in Nova Scotia. There they were to be granted land for new lives. Clement Virgo and series producer Damon D'Oliveira purchased the rights to Hill's novel in 2009 and began work on a feature film script. CBC and BET came on board in 2010 to develop the feature script as a six-part miniseries.

The international co-production began shooting in February 2014 in Cape Town, South Africa. Filming also took place in various locations around Nova Scotia, Canada. This included the Fortress of Louisbourg, used to portray 18th-century New York City and Canvas Town; Lunenburg harbour for the historic New York harbour, and Shelburne's Dock Street used as the scene of historic Shelburne. Filming was completed by the beginning of June 2014.

Prior to its television debut, the series had special cinematic screenings at the Marché International des Programmes de Communication and the Canadian International Television Festival.

== Cast ==
- Aunjanue Ellis as Aminata Diallo
- Lyriq Bent as Chekura
- Cuba Gooding Jr. as Samuel Fraunces
- Louis Gossett Jr. as Daddy Moses
- Ben Chaplin as Cpt. John Clarkson
- Allan Hawco as Solomon Lindo
- Greg Bryk as Robertson Appleby
- Jane Alexander as Maria Witherspoon
- Stephan James as Cummings Shakspear
- Shailyn Pierre-Dixon as Young Aminata
- Cara Ricketts as Bertilda
- Tuks Tad Lungu as Rono

== Episodes ==
No.	Title	Directed by	Written by	Original air date (CBC)	US air date (BET)	CBC viewers (millions)
1	"Episode 1"	Clement Virgo	Lawrence Hill and Clement Virgo	January 7, 2015	February 16, 2015	1.941
In Africa, eleven-year-old Aminata Diallo learns from her mother how to be a midwife, and her father teaches her Islam. When she is captured by slavers that murder both her parents, a young African named Chekura shows her kindness while escorting the captives to the sea. He is also carried on the ship as a slave, and Aminata bonds with him. The captives are forced to endure a hazardous journey to America, where they are sold as slaves to different owners in South Carolina and separated.
2	"Episode 2"	Clement Virgo	Lawrence Hill and Clement Virgo	January 14, 2015	February 16, 2015	1.607
Aminata, now grown, works on Robinson Appleby's Indigo plantation. After several seasons of deflecting Appleby's advances, Aminata is raped by the planter. She marries Chekura and has his child. Infuriated, Appleby sells her and her daughter to separate owners. Her new owners, a Jewish indigo trader and his wife, Solomon and Rosa Lindo, treat Aminata better. But after Rosa and her baby die from smallpox, and Aminata learns that Solomon brokered the sale of her child, she loses her trust in him. Lindo, desperate for a distraction, takes Aminata with him on a business trip to New York City, which is occupied by the British. Aminata plots her escape to the British, who have promised freedom to slaves leaving rebel masters.
3	"Episode 3"	Clement Virgo	Lawrence Hill and Clement Virgo	January 21, 2015	February 17, 2015	1.594
When Revolution breaks out in New York, Aminata seizes her chance and escapes to freedom in the black neighborhood known as Canvas Town. She gains respect in the community by working as their midwife, and she makes new friends. A local inn owner, also negro, admires her literacy and wisdom. She finds work and refuge in his inn, which is frequented by General George Washington. She is also reunited with Chekura.
4	"Episode 4"	Clement Virgo	Lawrence Hill and Clement Virgo	January 28, 2015	February 17, 2015	1.501
With the war's end, slave masters start seeking their fugitive slaves in Canvas Town to take them back. Aminata starts working for the British, in order to record in the Book of Negroes blacks who worked for the British during the war, so they may be freed and evacuated to Nova Scotia for a new life, as promised by the Crown. The British refused to return slaves to American masters. As she and Chekura prepare to board a ship for Nova Scotia, she is seized by authorities and Chekura leaves alone. She faces a trial as her first master, Robinson Appleby, claims that she was still legally his slave. Solomon Lindo shows up and proves that Appleby is lying, lifting his own claim to Aminata. She travels to Nova Scotia to find Chekura.
5	"Episode 5"	Clement Virgo	Lawrence Hill and Clement Virgo	February 4, 2015	February 18, 2015	1.577
Life in Nova Scotia is harsh for the freed blacks, as the climate is harsh, jobs are scarce in the new colony, and the land is not generous at all. Aminata continues to search for Chekura. She gives birth to a son she names Mamadu, but he dies of cholera. Conflicts with white loyalists arise. Due to her literacy and skills, Aminata finds work in a white lady's print shop, but she is fired after the owner's son is killed near the black village. She writes to British abolitionists seeking help for her people. The British begin a new project, to start a new colony in West Africa with black volunteers from London and Nova Scotia. Aminata is employed to help recruit people. She learns that Chekura reached Bermuda after a storm, and they are reunited in Nova Scotia. But the white Loyalists riot and attack the black village, doing damage and killing people (as in the historical Shelburne riots). Aminata and Chekura escape unharmed and board one of 15 ships, carrying nearly 2,000 blacks to Sierra Leone.
6	"Episode 6"	Clement Virgo	Lawrence Hill and Clement Virgo	February 11, 2015	February 18, 2015	1.532
The free negroes arrive in Sierra Leone. With the help of the British, they create a new town named Freetown. Aminata longs to return to her home village of Bayo, which is not too far from Freetown. When a slave coffle passes through Freetown, Aminata, Chekura, and Daddy Moses go to help. After finding a navigator near Freetown, Aminata leaves for Bayo accompanied by Chekura. Halfway through their journey, they encounter a slave coffle, as the trade continues. Aminata and Chekura want to free a little girl in the coffle. The slave traders threaten to enslave Chekura and Aminata if they interfere. At night, Chekura goes alone to free the entire coffle, but is killed in the process. Heartbroken, Aminata leaves for Britain to assist abolitionists in ending the slave trade. She writes a memoir about her life, and presents it to the pro-slave trade politicians. In the end, the vote is swung in the abolitionists' favor and a law is passed banning the Atlantic slave trade, but not slavery where it exists. Afterwards, Aminata meets Solomon Lindo again. He reunites her with her daughter May, who was taken to London.

== Reception ==
=== Ratings ===
1.7 million Canadians tuned in to watch the first episode of The Book of Negroes, making it "the highest-rated original drama for the network since Road to Avonlea's" January 7, 1990 premiere.

=== Reviews ===
Metacritic, which uses a weighted average, assigned a score of 77 out of 100 based on 9 reviews, indicating "generally favorable reviews".

=== Awards and nominations ===
Year	Award	Category	Nominee	Result
2015	Critics' Choice Television Awards	Best Limited Series		Nominated
2015	Critics' Choice Television Awards	Best Actress in a Movie/Miniseries	Aunjanue Ellis	Nominated
2015	Directors Guild of Canada	Best Direction TV Movie/Miniseries	Clement Virgo	Won
2015	Directors Guild of Canada	Best TV Movie/Miniseries		Won
2015	Directors Guild of Canada	Best Production Design TV Movie/Miniseries	Jason Clarke	Won
2015	Directors Guild of Canada	Best Picture Editing TV Movie/Miniseries	Susan Shipton	Won
2015	Directors Guild of Canada	Best Picture Editing TV Movie/Miniseries	Kye Meechan	Nominated
2015	Directors Guild of Canada	Best Sound Editing TV Movie/Miniseries	Andrea Cyr, Claire Dobson, Martin Gwynn Jones, Joe Mancuso, David McCallum, Brennan Mercer, Brent Pickett, and David Rose	Won
2016	4th Canadian Screen Awards	Best Dramatic Miniseries or TV Movie		Won
2016	4th Canadian Screen Awards	Best Lead Actor in a Television Film or Miniseries	Lyriq Bent	Won
2016	4th Canadian Screen Awards	Best Lead Actress in a Television Film or Miniseries	Aunjanue Ellis	Won
2016	4th Canadian Screen Awards	Best Supporting Actress in a Television Film or Miniseries	Shailyn Pierre-Dixon	Won
2016	4th Canadian Screen Awards	Best Make-Up	Lalette Littlejohn, Francesca Van der Feyst, Talia Barak and Koketso Mbuli	Nominated
2016	4th Canadian Screen Awards	Best Costume Design	Kate Carin	Won
2016	4th Canadian Screen Awards	Best Production Design/Art Direction in a Fiction Program or Series	Jason Clarke, Ian Greig, Robert van de Coolwyk, Brian Glaser and Renee Filipova	Won
2016	4th Canadian Screen Awards	Best Sound in a Fiction Program or Series	Derek Mansveldt, David Rose, David McCallum, Martin Gwynn Jones, Joe Mancuso, Steve Hammond, Erik Culp, Frank Morrone, Scott Shepherd and Alexander Rosborough	Won
2016	4th Canadian Screen Awards	Best Direction in a Dramatic Program or Miniseries	Clement Virgo	Won
2016	4th Canadian Screen Awards	Best Original Score	Philip Miller	Won
2016	4th Canadian Screen Awards	Best Writing in a Dramatic Program or Miniseries	Clement Virgo, Lawrence Hill	Won
2016	4th Canadian Screen Awards	Best Cross-Platform Digital Project, Non-Fiction	The Book of Negroes Interactive	Won

== See also ==
- List of films featuring slavery
- List of films about the American Revolution
- List of television series and miniseries about the American Revolution
