= Harry Washington =

Slave of George Washington (1740–1800)

- Born: c. 1740; Gambia
- Died: 1800; Sierra Leone
- Resting place: Sierra Leone
- Occupations: Slave, soldier, politician, colonizer
- Spouse: Jenny Washington
- Military career
- Allegiance: Kingdom of Great Britain
- Rank: Sergeant
- Unit: Black Company of Pioneers
- Conflicts: American Revolutionary War

Harry Washington (c. 1740–1800) was a Black Loyalist in the American Revolutionary War, enslaved for a time by Virginia planter George Washington, later the first President of the United States. After the British lost the war, he was evacuated to Nova Scotia. In 1792 he joined nearly 1,200 freedmen for resettlement in Sierra Leone, where they set up a colony of free people of color.

Harry had been born in what is now Gambia and sold into slavery as a war captive. He was purchased by George Washington, who had plantations in Virginia. During the American Revolutionary War, Harry Washington escaped from slavery in Virginia and served as a corporal in the Black Pioneers attached to a British artillery unit. After the war he was among Black Loyalists resettled by the British in Nova Scotia, where they were granted land. There Washington married Jenny, another freed American slave.

In 1792 the couple were among more than 1,000 freedmen chosen to migrate to Sierra Leone, West Africa, where the British had established a new colony of people of African descent. In 1800 Washington joined a rebellion against the British colonial authorities in the Sierra Leone Colony. He was exiled to the Bullom Shore, where he subsequently died.

== Biography ==
=== Early life ===
Washington was born in the Gambia River in West Africa around 1740. Because of this, he was termed a saltwater slave, used to describe slaves born in Africa, rather than in North America. In the colony of Virginia, he was purchased in 1763 to be part of George Washington's workforce in the Great Dismal Swamp of southeastern Virginia and northeastern North Carolina.

Washington later went to work on one of the Washington plantations in Mount Vernon, Virginia Colony. In 1771 he escaped from Mount Vernon and took refuge in New York, but later returned to the Washingtons.

=== American Revolutionary War ===
He had been working in the stables at Mount Vernon, caring for Washington's horses, when he fled again in 1776 to join the Virginia Ethiopian Regiment, made up of escaped slaves and established by Royal Governor of Virginia Lord Dunmore during the American Revolutionary War. Dunmore had recruited slaves of rebel masters, promising them freedom if they joined the British military effort.

Moving to New York in late 1776, Washington served as corporal in the Loyalist Black Pioneers, attached to a British artillery unit and part of the British forces in Governor Lord Dunmore's fleet. The Black Pioneers unit was tasked mainly with "cleaning the Streets & Removing all Nuisances being thrown into the Streets." The British occupied New York City through much of the war.

At the end of the American Revolution, Washington was one of about 3,000 Black Loyalists evacuated from New York by the British and resettled in Nova Scotia, along with two other former Mount Vernon slaves, a man and a woman. Sir Guy Carleton's officials included him on the list for evacuation in the Book of Negroes.

=== Emigration to Nova Scotia ===
The Crown granted the Loyalists land in Nova Scotia and Washington lived for several years in Birchtown, Nova Scotia, Canada, which had become the largest free African-American city in North America. There he married Jenny, another freed slave, and they began to plan for their future.

=== Emigration to Sierra Leone ===
Denied the right to vote and facing inadaquete protections against violence in Nova Scotia, in 1792, Harry and his wife joined 1,192 black colonists who migrated to Sierra Leone in West Africa to found a new colony. These colonists were known as the Nova Scotian Settlers. He planned to begin a farm, using scientific farming techniques he had learned at Mount Vernon.

In 1800, Washington was among several hundred settlers who rose up in a brief rebellion against British rule. The precipitating issue was one familiar from the American Revolution: taxation. The Sierra Leone Company, which ran the colony for the British government, required the settlers to pay taxes, called quitrents, for using their land, which land remained the property of the company. The rebels formed a provisional government and wrote a set of laws, which they nailed to the office door of a company administrator.

=== Internal exile and death ===
The Sierra Leone Company responded by sending a corps of recently arrived black Jamaican Maroons against the rebels. In the trials that followed the defeat of the rebellion, Washington was among the rebels sentenced to banishment to Bullom Shore, a flat but fertile area north of the new colony where Lungi Airport is located today. He became one of the two leaders of a new settlement but died there of disease. His descendants and those of other African Americans make up a portion of the Sierra Leone Creole people.

== See also ==
- George Washington and slavery
- List of enslaved people of Mount Vernon
- List of slaves
