= Black Loyalist Heritage Centre =

Museum in Nova Scotia, Canada

- Coat of arms of the Black Loyalist Heritage Society
- Location: 119 Old Birchtown Road, Birchtown, Nova Scotia, Canada
- Coordinates: 43.744378°N 65.382374°W
- Owner: Nova Scotia Museum
- Website: blackloyalist.com

The Black Loyalist Heritage Centre is a Canadian historic site and museum in Birchtown, Nova Scotia, documenting the history of the Black Loyalists. The heritage centre is maintained by the Black Loyalist Heritage Society and is part of the Nova Scotia Museum system.

== History ==
The Black Loyalists Heritage Centre and Historical Site was established in the late 1980s. In 2006, the offices of the Black Loyalist Heritage Society were destroyed by fire in what appeared to be an act of arson, destroying many photographs and genealogical records. In 2012, a new 10,000 square foot heritage centre opened to the public, built using CA$4 million of funding acquired from the provincial and federal governments, the District of Shelburne, and fundraising efforts of the Black Loyalist Heritage Society.

In 2022, the Halifax-based artist Kordeena Clayton became the first artist-in-residence at the Black Loyalist Heritage Centre, holding the position for the month of May.

== Exhibits ==
The Black Loyalist Heritage Centre is located on a 2-acre property with heritage buildings and trails, with guided tours available. The Lindsay Exhibition Gallery is a multimedia gallery which displays the names of the 3,000 Black Loyalists recorded in the Book of Negroes, and features a glass floor to view an archaeological pit below. The old school house, a one-room building erected in 1835, was used as a school until 1961 and later purchased by the Black Loyalist Heritage Society, becoming the first Black Loyalist Heritage Museum.

Also located on the property is St. Paul's Anglican Church, erected between 1888 and 1905 on the site of the meeting hall used by the first generation of Black Loyalists who settled in Birchtown. In 1996, a National Monument was erected on the property in honour of these settlers.

The Black Loyalist Heritage Museum displays a variety of artifacts brought to Nova Scotia by Black Loyalists from New York City, alongside British goods they purchased from the nearby town of Shelburne. Archaeologists have discovered 13,000 artifacts across Birchtown, with majority of the artifacts on display at the museum coming from the area known as the Acker site.

The museum holds several pieces of period clothing which were used as costumes in the 2015 Canadian television miniseries The Book of Negroes.

== See also ==
- Africville Museum
- Black Cultural Centre for Nova Scotia
- New Brunswick Black History Society
