= Moses Wilkinson =

American Wesleyan Methodist preacher and Black Loyalist

- Born: 1746/47
- Other name: Daddy Moses Old Moses
- Occupation: Wesleyan Methodist preacher

Moses "Daddy Moses" Wilkinson or "Old Moses" (c. 1746/47 – ?) was an American Wesleyan Methodist preacher and Black Loyalist. His ministry combined Old Testament divination with African religious traditions such as conjuring and sorcery. He gained freedom from slavery in Virginia during the American Revolutionary War and was a Wesleyan Methodist preacher in New York and Nova Scotia. In 1791, he migrated to Sierra Leone, preaching alongside ministers Boston King and Henry Beverhout. There, he established the first Methodist church in Settler Town and survived a rebellion in 1800.

== Early life ==
Circa 1746, Moses Wilkinson was born enslaved on a plantation in Nansemond County, Virginia. He was enslaved by Miles Wilkinson.

Wilkinson was blind and unable to walk without assistance, possibly due to surviving smallpox.

== Self-liberation ==
The 1775 Dunmore's Proclamation promised slaves of American rebels their freedom if they would join the British forces fighting in the American Revolutionary War. The following year, Wilkinson led a band of slaves to freedom, also freeing himself. He reached New York City, which the British forces occupied for years during the war.

== Ministry ==
=== New York ===
In New York, the self-appointed, illiterate Wesleyan Methodist preacher gathered together a congregation. He was "a very fiery preacher, so much that some who watched him feared for his health."

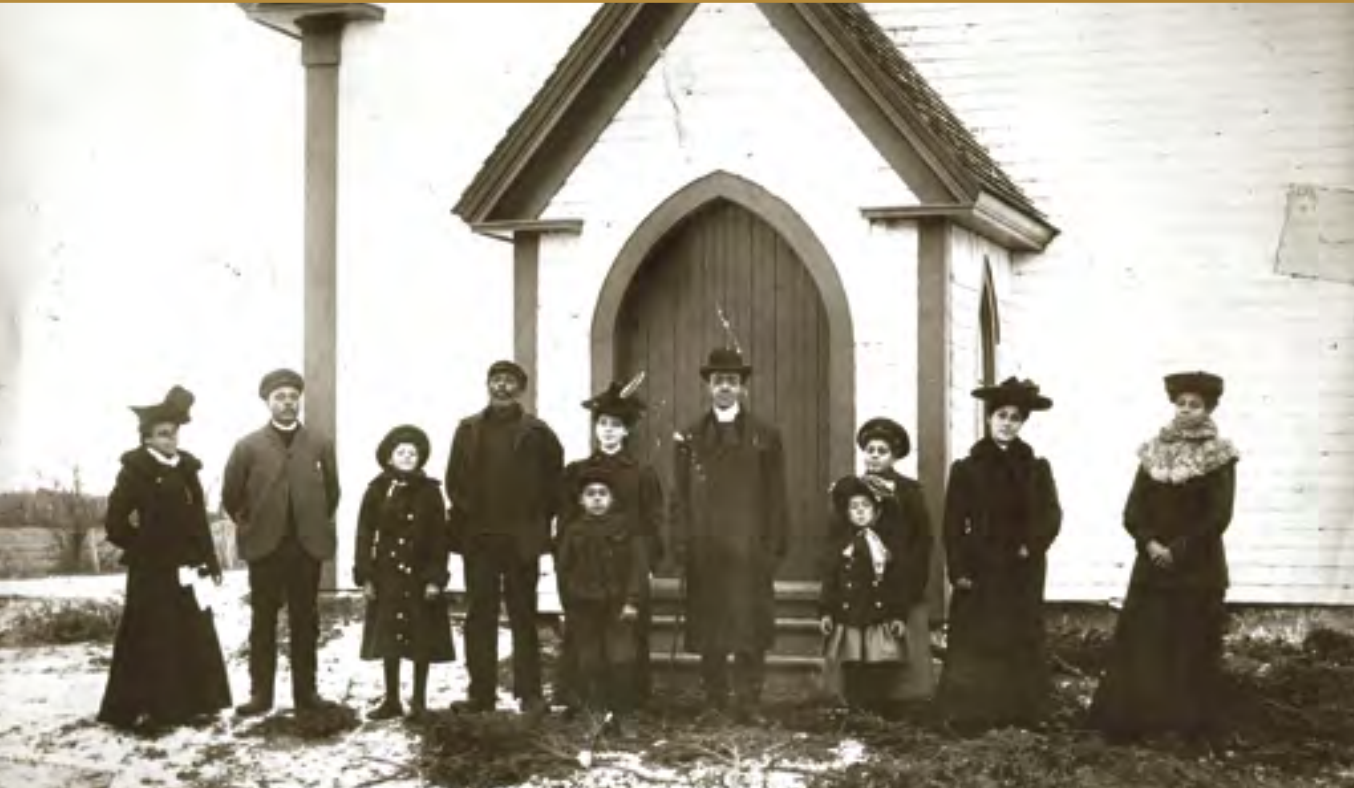
Congregants of the Shelburne Methodist Episcopal Church (1873-1940s), the "spiritual descendant of Moses Wilkinson's original congregation."

=== Nova Scotia ===
When the British were defeated in 1783, they fulfilled their promise of freedom to thousands of former slaves, evacuating them to other colonies and England. Wilkinson joined some 3,000 other Black Loyalists in on L'Abondance to Halifax in Nova Scotia; he is listed with them in the Book of Negroes. The largest Black Loyalist settlement in Nova Scotia was established in Birchtown, but the refugees found the climate and conditions harsh, and the Crown was slow to grant them land.

In the spring of 1784, Shelburne was visited by William Black, the province's future Methodist leader. Shelburne reported preaching to 200 Blacks at Birchtown, sixty of whom were converted by Wilkinson. His first convert was Violet "Peggy" King, a self-liberated freedwoman from North Carolina, whom he had met on L'Abondance; she was married to Boston King.

In July 1786, Wilkinson and others organized a Methodist church with seventy-eight members, sixty-six of whom were black.

=== Sierra Leone ===
On 26 October 1791, 350 people gathered in Wilkinson's church to hear John Clarkson from England explain the Sierra Leone Company's plans to reestablish a colony in West Africa, in what is now Sierra Leone. The previous attempt in 1787 had failed and he was recruiting Black Loyalists who wanted to try creating their own settlement in Africa. Displeased with the cold climate and discrimination from the resident whites, who included Loyalist slaveholders, Wilkinson, members of his Methodist congregation, and many blacks of other congregations emigrated; some 1196 Nova Scotian Settlers set sail from Halifax on 15 January 1792.

The ships made landfall on March 9, 1792. Wilkinson established the first Methodist church in Settler Town. The officers of the Sierra Leone Company clashed with members of the independent-minded Christian denominations, and matters came to a head with a failed rebellion led by Methodists in 1800. Two Methodists were executed; a number of others, mostly Methodist, were exiled elsewhere in West Africa. Wilkinson's brand of Methodism lost favour in the colony.

== Legacy ==
His ministry inspired Gowan Pamphlet, minister and freedman who founded the Black Baptist Church in Williamsburg, Virginia.

As detailed above, Wilkinson's preaching led to the creation of the Black Methodist community of Halifax.

== See more ==
- List of Black Loyalists
