= Royal Gazette and Sierra Leone Advertiser =

The Royal Gazette and Sierra Leone Advertiser was a paper published in Freetown, Sierra Leone from 1817 to 1827. In all, 457 issues were printed between the first (2 August 1817) and the final edition (29 September 1827).

The paper was printed and published by Abraham Hazeley, Nova Scotian settler.
