= Book of Negroes =

1783 British document

- The National Archives, London; Nova Scotia Museum, Halifax; National Archives and Records Administration, Washington, DC
- Date: 1783

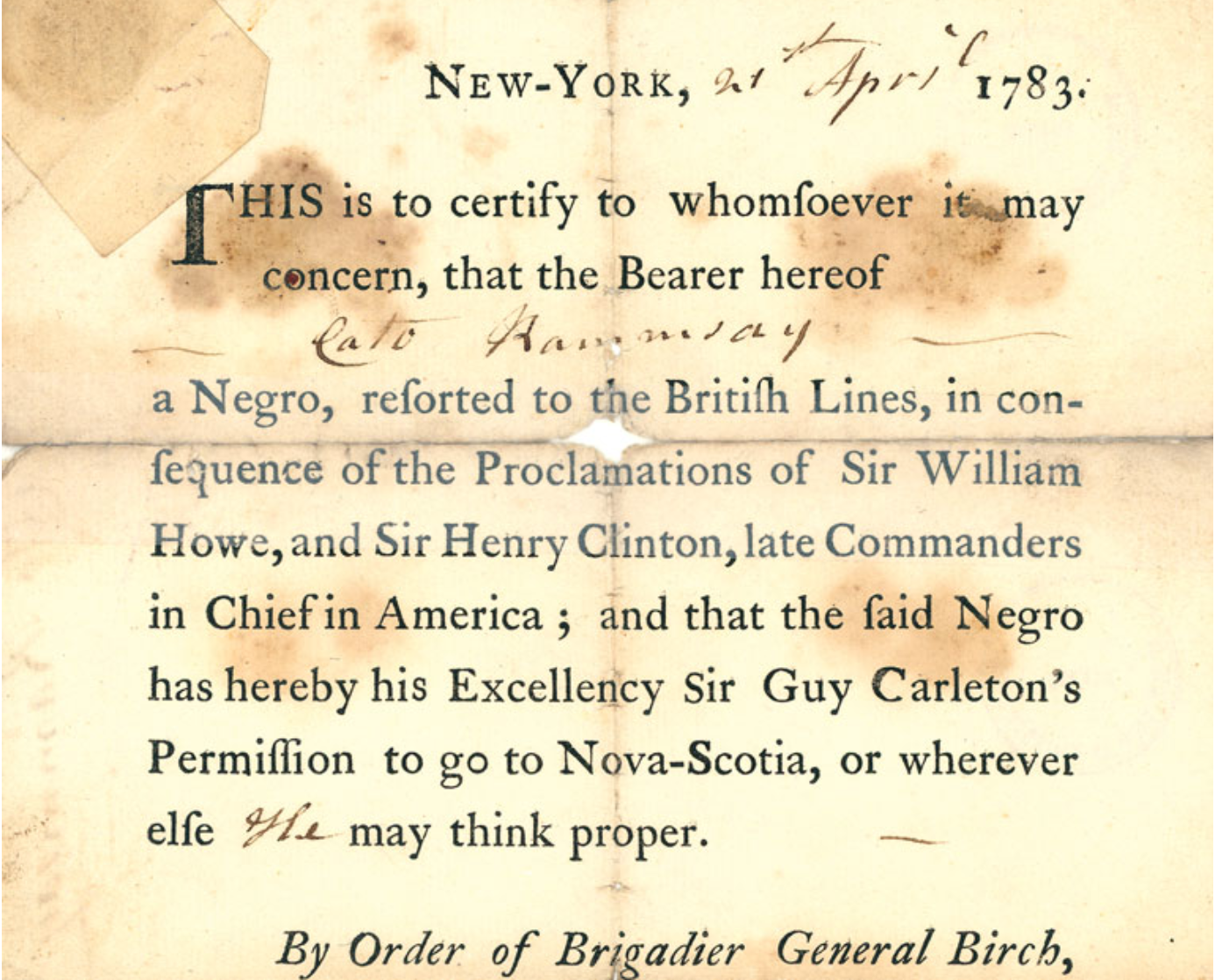
Freedom certificate issued by Brigadier-general Samuel Birch to Cato Ramsay, whose name was entered into the Book of Negroes

The Book of Negroes was a document created by Brigadier-general Samuel Birch, under the direction of Sir Guy Carleton, that records names and descriptions of 3,000 Black Loyalists who fled to British lines during the American Revolutionary War and were evacuated to other parts of the British Empire as free people of colour.

== Background ==
The first African person in Nova Scotia arrived with the founding of Port Royal in 1605. African people were then brought as slaves to Nova Scotia during the founding of Louisbourg and Halifax. The first major migration of Black Americans to Nova Scotia happened during the American Revolution. Enslaved Black Americans in America who escaped to the British during the American Revolutionary War became the first settlement of Black Nova Scotians and Black Canadians. Other Black Loyalists were transported to settlements in several islands in the West Indies and some to London. Recorded in 1783, this 150-page document is the only one to have recorded Black Canadians in a large, detailed scope of work.

== Contents ==
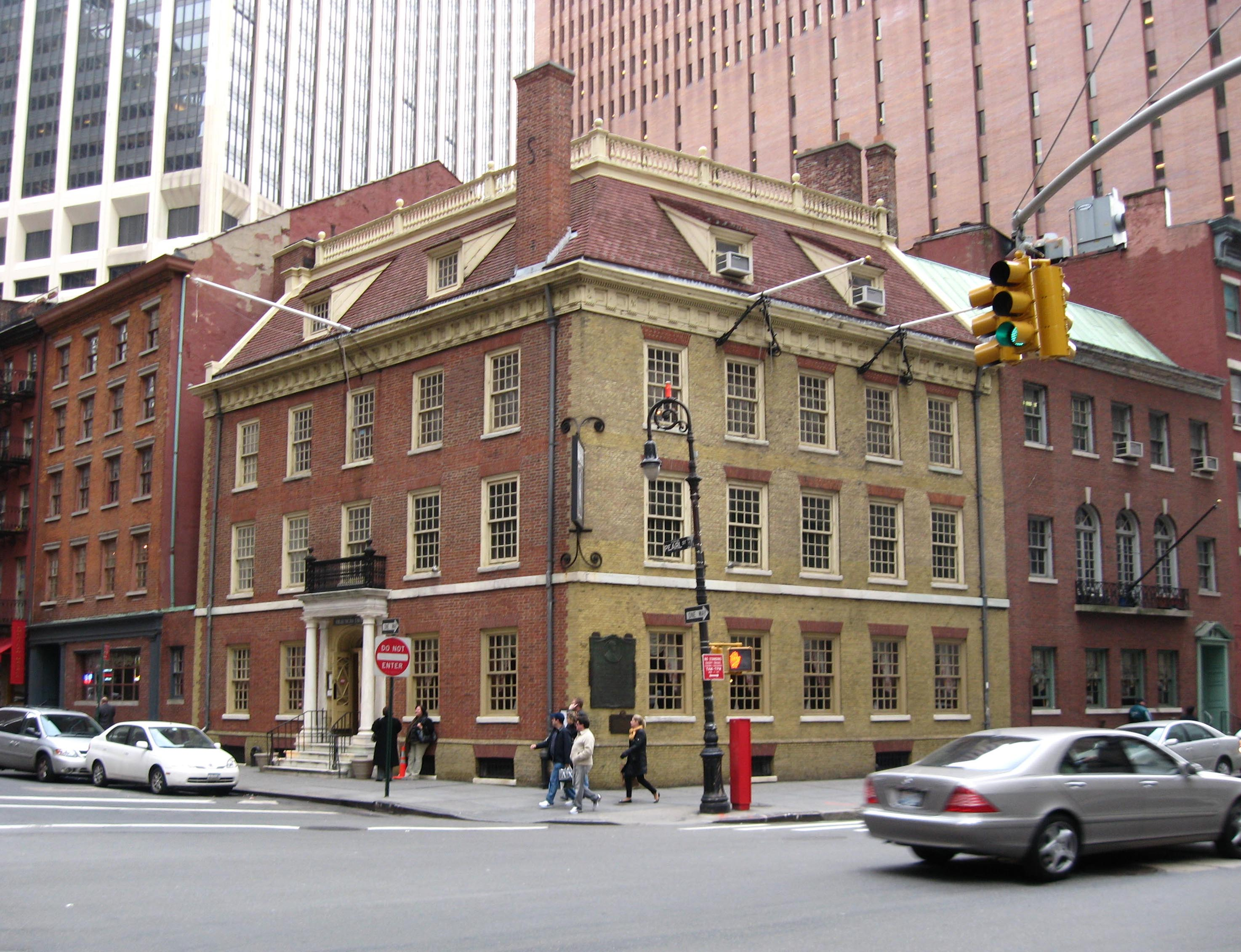
Fraunces Tavern, where Birch assembled the Book of Negroes

The document contains records on 2,800 African Americans; the former slaves recorded in the Book of Negroes were evacuated to British North America, where they were settled in the newly established Birchtown and other places in the colony. According to the Treaty of Paris (1783), the United States argued for the return of all property, including slaves. The British refused to return the slaves, to whom they had promised freedom during the war for joining their cause. The detailed records were created to document the freed people whom the British resettled in Nova Scotia, along with other Loyalists. The book was assembled by Brigadier-general Samuel Birch, the namesake of Birchtown, Nova Scotia, under the direction of Sir Guy Carleton.

Some freedmen later migrated from Nova Scotia to Sierra Leone, where they formed the original settlers of Freetown, under the auspices of the Sierra Leone Company. They are among the ancestors of the Sierra Leone Creole ethnic group.

Notable people recorded in the Book of Negroes include Boston King, Harry Washington, Moses Wilkinson and Cato Perkins.

As the Book of Negroes was recorded separately by American and British officers, there are two versions of the document. The British version is held in The National Archives in Kew, London. The American version is held by the National Archives and Records Administration in Washington, D.C. It was published under the title The Black Loyalist Directory: African Americans in Exile After the American Revolution (1996), edited by Graham Russell Hodges, Susan Hawkes Cook, and Alan Edward Brown.

== Representation in other media ==
The Canadian novelist Lawrence Hill wrote The Book of Negroes (2007, published in the United States as Someone Knows My Name). It is inspired by the 3,000 former Black American Slaves from America, many of whom were owned by White American slave owners. The former enslaved Black Americans were given free land and housing by the British, in a Nova Scotia town called Birchtown, named after the original author of "The Book of Negros" British Brigadier General Samuel Birch.

In 1792 1,200 Black American residents of Birchtown chose to emigrate to another British Colony called Sierra Leone, which was founded by a British Lieutenant John Clarkson for freedmen in Sierra Leone.

During the 1784 Shelburne riots that lasted 5 days—no fatalities. The American refugees were upset the free land and jobs were only being given to the former black African slaves who worked for less pay.

He features Aminata Diallo, a young African woman captured as a child; she is literate and acts as a scribe to record the information about the former slaves. The book won the top 2008 Commonwealth Writers' Prize.

Canadian director Clement Virgo adapted the book into a six-hour television mini-series of the same title. The series premiered on CBC in Canada on 7 January 2015 and on BET in the United States on 16 February 2015 and starred Aunjanue Ellis, Lyriq Bent, Cuba Gooding Jr. and Louis Gossett Jr.

== See also ==
- Black Nova Scotians
- Rough Crossings (subtitle: Britain, the Slaves and the American Revolution), a history book and television series by Simon Schama.
