= Kaffu Bullom Chiefdom =

Kaffu Bullom Chiefdom is an administrative area located in Port Loko District, Northern Province, Sierra Leone.

== History ==
Kaffu Bullom has also been known as Bullom Shore, and was one of the areas inhabited by the Bullom people. Bullom means low-lying land, and the Bullom shore stretches from Leopard Island in the North West to Tagrin Point.

John Macaulay Wilson, one of the first Africans trained in European medicine was the son of a Kaffu Bullom chief. Following the death of his father, King George, he was elected King on 4 March 1827 in the presence of James Holman.

Gustavus Reinhold Nyländer was based here between 1812 and 1818, and worked on his Grammar and Vocabulary of the Bullom Language during his stay.

== Contemporary ==
In November 2015 the Cameroonian footballer Samuel Eto'o was crowned paramount chief. He was visiting Sierra Leone as part of the FIFA "11 for Health and 11 against Ebola" programme in the country.
