= Charles Wenzel =

Lutheran missionary from Silesia (born 1769)

Charles Frederic Wenzel (1769–19th century) was a German Lutheran missionary who worked in Sierra Leone. He worked under the auspices of the Anglican Church Missionary Society (CMS).

Wenzel was from Breslau, Silesia and attended a seminary in Berlin. He left for England in 1807, where he presented himself to the CMS who found him suitable missionary material.

In 1816, he was appointed to the missionary facilities at Kissy, Sierra Leone. This village had been founded to accommodate liberated enslaved Africans who had been freed by the Royal Navy's West Africa Squadron. In 1818, Wenzel ran a school at which 74 boys and 72 girls attended.

He married Frances Beverhout, the daughter of Henry Beverhout. Gustavus Reinhold Nyländer was his brother-in-law.
