= John Macaulay Wilson =

African King

John Macaulay Wilson was an African King, and one of the first Africans to receive a European medical training. He was sent from Sierra Leone to Britain for medical training in either 1794 or 1796. He returned to fill a number of roles, including Assistant Colonial Surgeon at the hospital in Leicester, Sierra Leone.

Macaulay Wilson was the son of King George, chief of Kaffu Bullom, and joined the household of Zachary Macaulay and later that of Thomas Masterman Winterbottom.

He was a juror during the trial of Samuel Samo in 1812.

Following the death of his father, King George, he was elected King on 4 March 1827 in the presence of James Holman.
