= Gustavus Reinhold Nyländer =

German Lutheran missionary and linguist (1776-1825)

Gustavus Reinhold Nyländer (1776–1825, Kissy, Sierra Leone) was a German Lutheran missionary and linguist who worked in Sierra Leone. He worked under the auspices of the Anglican Church Missionary Society (CMS).

Nyländer grew up in Lithuania and then attended a seminary in Berlin. He came to London in 1805.

Nyländer arrived in Sierra Leone in September 1806 with Leopold Butscher and Johann Prasse, all three of them Lutherans. Their instructions were to leave the settlement to work amongst the Susu people as soon as possible.

Between 1812 and 1818 Nyländer was based on the Bullom Shore (Kaffu Bullom). In 1814 he published Grammar and Vocabulary of the Bullom Language and Spelling-book of the Bullom Language: With a Dialogue and Scripture Exercises He subsequently moved to Kissy a village founded to cater for recaptives, enslaved Africans liberated by the Royal Navy's West Africa Squadron near Freetown. He died here in 1825 from an illness which affected many missionaries.

== Family ==
He married Anne Beverhout, the daughter of the African-American Methodist minister Henry Beverhout. Charles Wenzel was his brother-in-law.

He had two daughters, Hannah and Anne. Both daughters married missionaries; Hannah married Edward Jones while Anne went on to marry James Schön.

== Bibliography ==
- Spelling-book of the Bullom Language: With a Dialogue and Scripture Exercises London: For the Church Missionary Society, 1814.
- Grammar and Vocabulary of the Bullom Language London: For the Church Missionary Society, 1814.
- Book Hoa Matthew: The Gospel According to Saint Matthew, in Bullom & English London: Tilling and Hughes, 1816.
- Good Word to All People Who Wish to Go to Heaven London: For the Church Missionary Society, 1816.
- Select Portions of the Book of Common Prayer, according to the Use of the United Church of England and Ireland (1816), translated by Gustavus Reinhold Nyländer, digitized by Richard Mammana
