= Cato Perkins =

African-American slave and missionary

Cato Perkins was an enslaved African-American man from Charleston, South Carolina, who became a missionary to Sierra Leone.

Cato was enslaved by John Perkins. Cato Perkins self-emancipated by joining the British during the Siege of Charleston, and he joined General Clinton in New York and worked as a carpenter there. Perkins was evacuated to Birchtown, Nova Scotia, in 1783, and he is listed in the Book of Negroes. Upon arriving in Nova Scotia, he was converted by John Marrant of the Countess of Huntingdon's Connexion, which was a Methodist splinter group. Perkins was ordained into the church and later took over the running of it.

Perkins migrated to Sierra Leone, where he led a strike of carpenters against the Sierra Leone Company. The new life in Sierra Leone was not what the group had expected and Perkins petitioned the SLC to improve Freetown; In 1793 Perkins travelled with Isaac Anderson to London to make their petition heard. By 1800, inflated price-fixing was leading to food riots and Perkins negotiated between the rioters and the council.

Perkins established the first Huntingdon's Connexion church, with William Ash and John Ellis and later on, other Nova Scotian settler preachers established churches in the Liberated African villages.

Perkins died in Sierra Leone in 1805, although some sources state that he lived until 1820; his churches are the remnant of Huntingdon's Connexion church worldwide.

== Sources ==
- Sanneh, L.O. (1997). The Crown and the Turban: Muslims and West African Pluralism. Westview Press. ISBN 9780813330594.
- Director of Language Centre University of Ghana Mary Esther Kropp Dakubu Professor of Linguistics, L. (1997). Korle Meets the Sea : A Sociolinguistic History of Accra: A Sociolinguistic History of Accra. Oxford University Press, USA. ISBN 9780195345186.
- Sillinger, B. (2003). Sierra Leone: Current Issues and Background. Nova Science. ISBN 9781590336625.
- Schama, S. (2006). Rough Crossings: Britain, the Slaves and the American Revolution. HarperCollins. ISBN 9780060539160.
- Olson, J.S.; Shadle, R. (1991). Historical Dictionary of European Imperialism. Greenwood Press. ISBN 9780313262579.
- Ware, S. (1999). Forgotten Heroes: Inspiring American Portraits From Our Leading Historians. Free Press. ISBN 9780684868721.
- Clarke, G.E. (2002). Odysseys Home: Mapping African-Canadian Literature. University of Toronto Press. ISBN 9780802081919.
- Pybus, C. (2007). Epic Journeys of Freedom: Runaway Slaves of the American Revolution and Their Global Quest for Liberty. Beacon Press. ISBN 9780807055151.
- Tony Pace. "Cato Perkins". blackloyalist.com. Archived from the original on 19 February 2008.
- Tony Pace. "Freetown". blackloyalist.com. Archived from the original on 29 July 2013.
- Pybus, C. (2007). Epic Journeys of Freedom: Runaway Slaves of the American Revolution and Their Global Quest for Liberty. Beacon Press. ISBN 9780807055151.
- Clendenen, C.C.; Duignan, P. (1964). Americans in black Africa up to 1865. Hoover Institution on War, Revolution, and Peace, Stanford University.
- Religious Tract Society (Great Britain) (1880). The Sunday at Home. Religious Tract Society.
- Butt-Thompson, F.W. (1926). Sierra Leone in History and Tradition. Witherby.
- Forna, A. (2003). The Devil That Danced on the Water: A Daughter's Quest. Grove Press. ISBN 9780802140487.
- Lunn, K. (1985). Race and Labour in Twentieth-century Britain. Cass. ISBN 9780714632384.
