= Hartz Point, Nova Scotia =

Community in Nova Scotia, Canada

Coordinates: 43.741337°N 65.363238°W

Hartz Point is a community in the Canadian province of Nova Scotia, located in Shelburne County near Birchtown.
