= Shelburne riots =

Race riots in colonial Nova Scotia in 1784

- Location: Shelburne, Nova Scotia and Birchtown, Nova Scotia
- Date: July 25th 1784 – August 31st 1784
- Target: Black Nova Scotians, established landowners and government officials
- Attack type: Labour riot
- Deaths: Zero recorded

The Shelburne riots were attacks in July 1784 by landless Loyalist veterans of the American War of Independence against Black Loyalists and government officials in the town of Shelburne, Nova Scotia, and the nearby village of Birchtown. They have been characterized as the first race riots in Canada, and one of the earliest recorded race riots in North America.

== Origins ==
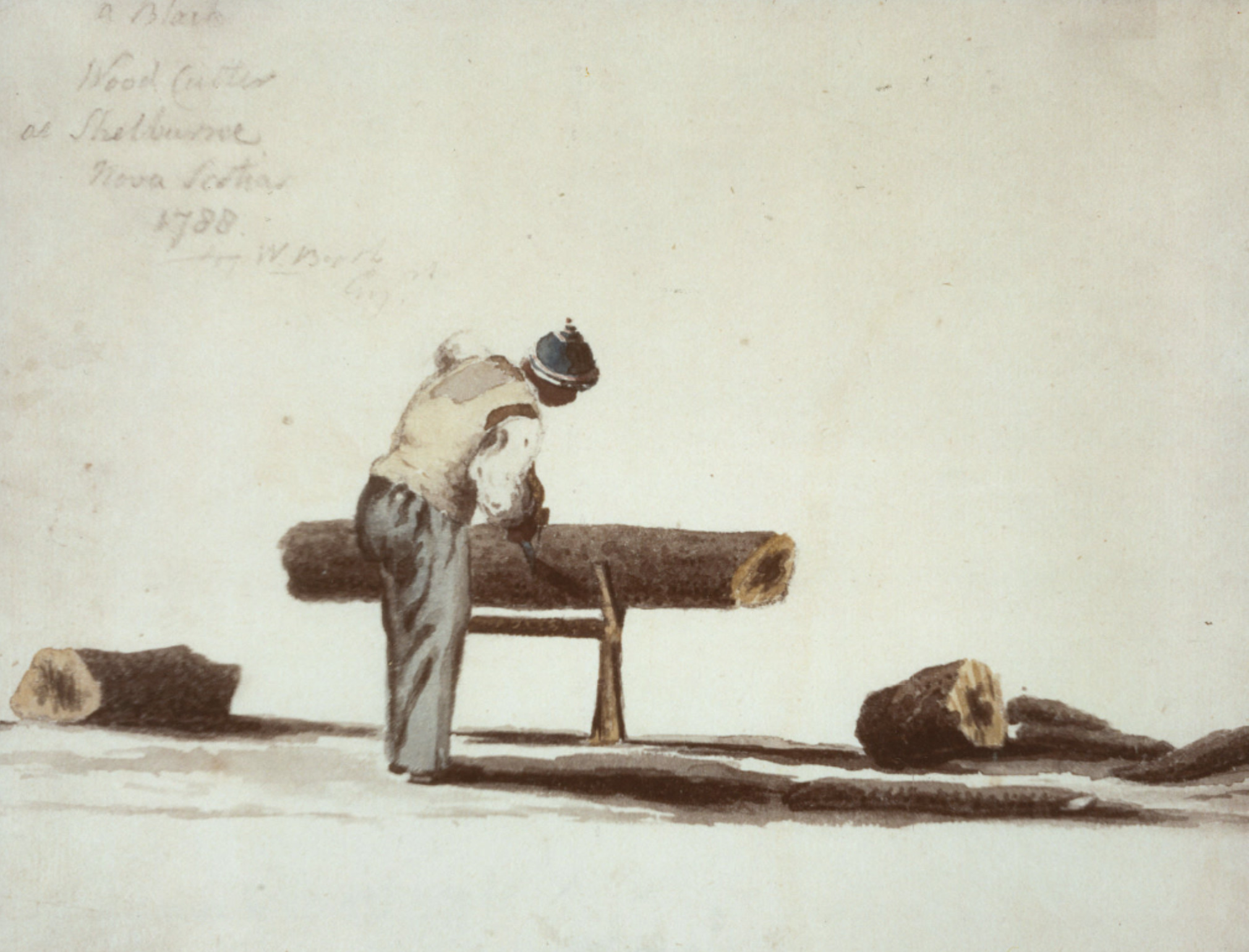
1788 illustration of a Black woodcutter in Shelburne, Nova Scotia

The town of Shelburne was created in 1783 as a settlement for United Empire Loyalists, who were American colonists who had sided with the British during the American War of Independence. Briefly the fourth-largest city in North America and the largest British North American city in the continent, the city of 10,000 people included over 1,500 African American slaves who ran away from their American masters to join the British. The British had promised them freedom, and the Crown granted them land in Birchtown, six miles outside Shelburne, but many also worked and lived in the town. The Black Loyalists faced a variety of racist disadvantages from denial of voting rights to harsher punishment before the courts. Tensions rose in Shelburne in the spring of 1784. Delays in supplies and awarding land grants created anger and frustration among the many disbanded soldiers, who suffered in the frontier town. They sought jobs while waiting for the land grants promised for their military service, but were faced with Black Loyalists, who received even fewer land grants and smaller rations and were thus willing to work for smaller wages.

David George, a popular black Baptist clergyman, became a lightning rod for racist anger. He had founded a Baptist church in Shelburne and attracted many followers, both black and white. In the spring of 1784, as David George prepared to baptize white couple William and Deborah Holmes, a small mob of Deborah's relatives disrupted the service to stop the event. Shelburne magistrates were called and ruled that the couple were free to be baptized in a church of their choosing. The baptism went ahead, but racial tension grew among landless white Loyalists.

== The Riot ==
On the night of July 25, the riot began as a large group of white men attacked David George and the Black Loyalists in Shelburne.

Several of the black people had houses upon my lot, but forty (40) or fifty (50) disbanded soldiers were employed, who came with the tackle of ships, and turned my dwelling house, and every one of their houses, quite over, and the meeting house they would have burned down, had not the ringleader of the mob himself prevented it. But I continued to preaching it till they came one night, and stood before the pulpit, and swore how they would treat me If I preached again. But I stayed and preached, and the next day they came and beat me with sticks and drove me into the swamp. I returned in the evening, and took my wife and children over to the river to Birchtown.

— David George

George's home and 20 other homes of free Blacks in Shelburne were destroyed in the first night of rioting. Many of the free Blacks fled to Birchtown for safety. George stayed and continued to preach in Shelburne but at his next service a number of white rioters stormed into the church and threatened him. The next day they attacked him, beating him with sticks until he escaped into swampy area outside of Shelburne. He returned at night to rescue his wife and children and they sought shelter in Birchtown along with most of the free Blacks who had formerly lived and worked in Shelburne.

The Loyalist land agent in Shelburne, Benjamin Marston, wrote after the first day of rioting, "Great Riot today. The disbanded soldiers have risen against the free negroes to drive them out of town because they labour more cheaply." The next day the rioters attacked Marston's house. He escaped to the military barracks across the harbour and that afternoon boarded a coastal schooner headed for Halifax, shortly before rioters arrived at the barracks reportedly intent on hanging him. Attacks by rioters continued in town for ten days, targeting some white Loyalists, such as Thomas and James Courtney, who had received large land grants on the Roseway River to set up a sawmill. The Courtneys were wealthy enough to hire armed guards to protect their properties.

Attacks continued for another month against Black Loyalists, as rioters made incursions against the Black settlement at Birchtown. Black Loyalists, many of whom were also army veterans, organized into militia companies. Initially they could defend themselves but were unable to quell the continuing violence. Attacks on Blacks traveling along the road between Birchtown and Shelburne for work and supplies continued for a month. Reports of the attacks spread around Nova Scotia; Simeon Perkins, in the town of Liverpool to the east, wrote, "An extraordinary mob or riot has happened at Shelburne. Some thousands of people assembled Clubs and Drove the Negroes out of the Town." The mob was stopped by the arrival of troops from the 17th Regiment of Foot, later assisted by crew of a frigate.

== Aftermath ==
Dozens of homes, mostly of Black Loyalists, had been destroyed in the riots while others were looted. An unknown number of people were injured. No deaths were recorded. Most rioters wounded and threatened their targets; few owned firearms. Free Blacks had essentially been driven out of the town of Shelburne, firmly establishing it as a segregated white community, aside from Black slaves and indentured servants. Black Loyalists were forced to seek a livelihood in the poor lands and overcrowded settlement of Birchtown.

The Governor of Nova Scotia, John Parr, traveled to Shelburne on August 23 to attempt to settle the disputes and delays in land grants. Parr blamed the riot on delays in awarding land. He blamed Marston, calling him "a shark trying to prey on helpless settlers". Marston was dismissed from his post. None of the rioters who attacked the Black Loyalists or Marston were identified or brought to justice. When whites attacked some Mi'kmaq people at Shelburne in November, the ringleader Edward Cavan was put in the stocks and sentenced to six months in prison.

Despite the eventual settlement of Loyalist land grants in 1785, the economy of Shelburne collapsed in the late 1780s. It suffered the lack of agricultural land, a collapse of the whale fishery, and poor inland trade routes: four-fifths of the population left for other settlements. David George and more than 1200 Black Loyalists fled the racism and poverty of Shelburne in 1792 to settle Freetown, Sierra Leone where they became known as the Nova Scotian Settlers.

Scholars such as James Walker have interpreted the riots as caused by the economic predicaments of the Loyalists, which aggravated racial hostility. Marston is regarded by many scholars as a scapegoat for the larger problems of Loyalist land settlements and racism in the community. Some white Loyalists still held slaves; others resented competing with blacks for the limited number of jobs.

== Depictions in popular culture ==
The Shelburne riots were dramatized in the BBC Two docudrama series Rough Crossings, based on the history of the same name by Simon Schama.

The riots are also depicted in fiction in the novel The Book of Negroes by Lawrence Hill and the adapted television miniseries of the same name. The authors changed the date of the riot in the latter two works to fit the fictional narrative. In addition, the riots are depicted as a mass lynching with hangings, multiple murders, and a church burning, which was not documented in fact.

== See also ==
- List of incidents of civil unrest in Canada
