= David George (Baptist) =

Historical figure

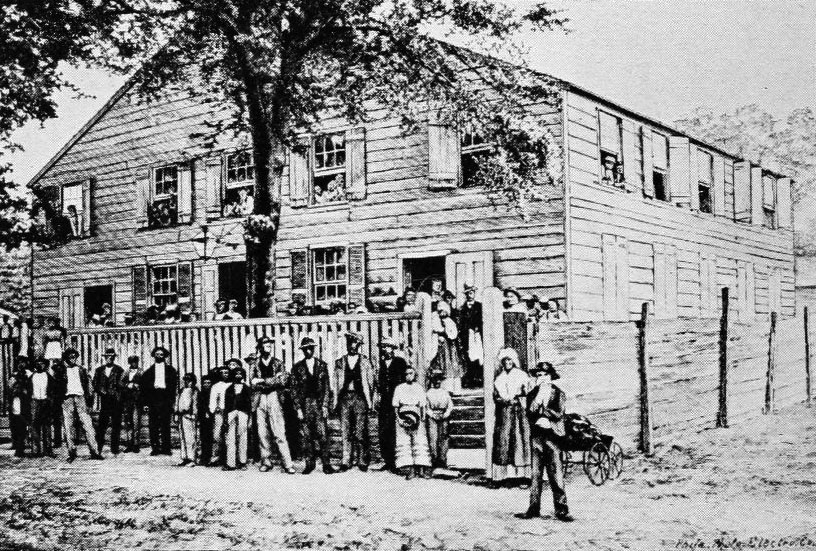
David George helped found the Silver Bluff Baptist Church, one of the first black churches in America. No known images exist of David George.

David George (c. 1742–1810) was an African-American Baptist preacher and a Black Loyalist from the American South who escaped to British lines in Savannah, Georgia; later he accepted transport to Nova Scotia and land there. He eventually resettled in Freetown, Sierra Leone where he would eventually die. With other enslaved people, George founded the Silver Bluff Baptist Church in South Carolina in 1775, the first black congregation in the present-day United States. He was later affiliated with the First African Baptist Church of Savannah, Georgia. After migration, he founded Baptist congregations in Nova Scotia and Freetown, Sierra Leone. George wrote an account of his life, an important early slave narrative.

== Early life and escapes ==
David George was born in Essex County, Virginia, in 1742, to African-American parents John and Judith, enslaved by a man called 'Chapel'. George ran away after witnessing his mother's horrible whipping. He also personally experienced a traumatic severe whipping. George received help to run away from some white travelers and worked for these men for some time. It was not until his enslaver offered a reward for George that he ran away and worked for another white man whom he encountered (this time for many years). Because his enslaver continued to pursue him, George migrated to South Carolina.

He was captured by a Creek Indian chief named Blue Salt. He considered George his prize and made him work. When George's enslaver found out he was working for Blue Salt, he brought rum, linen, and a gun to exchange for George, but Blue Salt refused to give him up. For several years, George worked for Creek and Natchez Indians.

George escaped and ran away again, this time encountering a Scottish trader named George Galphin (appears in some records as Gaulfin, Gaulphin), for whom he worked four years at Silver Bluff, South Carolina. Because of his close association with the Native Americans, Galphin enslaved many people who had intermarried with the Creek.

George received help to read and write from the children of Galphin. He primarily used the Bible while learning how to read and write.

== Marriage and family ==
During this time, George met and married Phyllis, who was part Creek. Together they had four children born in what is now the United States. They had two more children born while in Nova Scotia and four more children born in Sierra Leone.

== Baptism ==
In 1773, George met a formerly enslaved old childhood friend, George Liele, who had converted to the Baptist faith. During the Great Awakening, Baptist preachers had traveled throughout the Southern United States, converting both whites and blacks, free and enslaved. Brother Palmer was a white Minister who uplifted and spread the word of God to David George and other Black people. Palmer was the start of the Church in Silver Bluff. Impressed with Liele's conversion, George, his wife, and eight others were baptized at Silver Bluff. In 1775, George and eight other enslaved people formed one of the first African-American Baptist congregations in the United States.

A somewhat different account of George during these years is presented by Mark A. Noll, American church historian:

"The first continuing black church was the Silver Bluff Church in Aiken County, South Carolina, where an African-American preacher, David George (1742–1810), established a congregation around 1773 or 1774. George's pilgrimage marked him as one of the most remarkable religious figures of his century. After serving as a slave, he was converted through the influence of an-other slave named Cyrus. Soon George began to exhort his fellow bondsmen, an activity that led to his becoming, in effect, the pastor of the Silver Bluff Church. ... American patriots were trying to throw off the "slavery" of Parliament, but for those in chattel bondage like David George, the British were the agents who combated racial, chattel slavery."

Three years later, during the American Revolutionary War, the enslaved people escaped to Savannah, where they gained freedom behind British lines, as they had occupied the city. George continued to minister to a Baptist congregation.

== Nova Scotia and Sierra Leone ==
As they had promised, in 1782, the British began transportation of Black Loyalist freedmen to Nova Scotia and other colonies. They transported George, his wife, and three children (Jesse, David, and Ginny) to Shelburne, Nova Scotia for freedom after the defeat of the British during the American War of Independence. This was part of an evacuation of nearly 3500 formerly enslaved people from the United States to Nova Scotia. George established a church in Shelburne and became the leader of the Baptist contingent of the African-American Loyalists, and he also attracted whites to his congregation. Some whites resented his influence in the community. His house and those of many of his followers were attacked and destroyed in July 1784 by racist mobs in the Shelburne Riots. George and his wife moved to the nearby Free Black settlement of Birchtown. They became an influential African-American family at the center of black settlement.

Several years later, the George family chose to migrate with other Black Loyalists to Freetown, Sierra Leone, where the British provided some assistance in setting up a new colony and settlement in West Africa.

William Gwinn, his wife and daughter also emigrated to Sierra Leone. George founded the first Baptist church there. George was very influential; he was elected a tythingman, a position of power in the colony then. George wrote a memoir that is considered an important slave narrative. He died in Freetown in 1810.

His descendants are part of the Sierra Leone Creole people of the Western Area of Freetown. Many of George's descendants belong to the Masonic Lodges of Sierra Leone. One of his descendants, also named David George, is a member of Amistad Sankofa, which educates students about international issues and bridges the racial divide.

In August 2007, the African United Baptist Association of Nova Scotia and the Atlantic Baptist Convention had a joint convention and liturgy to acknowledge earlier racism by the white convention and seek reconciliation. They had had separate associations since the 19th century.

== George in film ==
- George was portrayed by Joseph Marcell in the BBC television production of Rough Crossings (2007), based on the history of Black Loyalists and the formation of Freetown by Simon Schama.

== See also ==
- Black Nova Scotians
