= Africville Museum =

Museum in Halifax, Nova Scotia, Canada

- Location: Halifax, Nova Scotia, Canada
- Coordinates: 44.67386°N 63.61950°W
- Type: History museum
- Website: africvillemuseum.org

The Africville Museum is a museum in Halifax, Nova Scotia, which shares the history of the Africville community.

In 2010, a compensation agreement was made between the City of Halifax and the Africville Genealogical Society, as the City had relocated residents and demolished the long-standing Africville community in the 1960s. Compensation funds were used to construct a replica of the Seaville United Baptist Church, which now houses the museum.

== Background ==
The Africanville neighborhood was condemned and demolished in the 1960s. The Africville Genealogy Society was founded in 1983, to remember the demolished community. In March 1996, the Africville Genealogy Society filed a lawsuit against the City of Halifax for compensation for the harm caused by the relocation and demolition.

Africville was designated a National Historic Site by Parks Canada in 1997.

== Development and construction ==
Between 2005 and 2009, plans were developed for the reconstruction of the Seaville United Baptist Church and the creation of an Africville Interpretive Centre.

In February 2010, the Mayor of Halifax apologized to former Africville residents and their families. The settlement of the lawsuit included $3mil to support the construction plans.

Construction was completed on the church and museum in July 2012. The site is operated by the Africville Heritage Trust Board, including members of former Africville families.

In June 2023, the Government of Nova Scotia announced $150,000 in funding to support the museum's further development.

== See also ==
- Black Loyalist Heritage Centre
- Black Cultural Centre for Nova Scotia
- List of museums in Nova Scotia
