= Bullom Shore =

Region of Sierra Leone

Bullom Shore is a geographical area in Sierra Leone facing the Atlantic Ocean and the estuary of Sierra Leone River. Its name is derived from the Bullom people who traditionally speak the Bullom language. It is the location of the Kaffu Bullom Chiefdom. Bullom means low-lying land, and the Bullom shore stretches from Leopold Island in the North West to Tagrin Point.
