= Abraham Hazeley =

Nova Scotian Settler

Abraham Hazeley (1784–1847) was a Nova Scotian settler in Sierra Leone. He was the founder of what was to become one of the most prominent Creole families in the country.

Abraham Hazeley Junior was born in Birchtown, Nova Scotia to Abraham Hazeley and Martha 'Patty' Hazeley. Abraham Hazeley Sr. (1754–1809) was born in Charleston, South Carolina, and was one of the African Americans who settled in Nova Scotia in 1783.
