= Boston King =

American clergy and writer

Boston King (c. 1760–1802) was an American slave and Black Loyalist, who gained freedom from the British and settled in Nova Scotia after the American Revolutionary War. He later immigrated to Sierra Leone, where he helped find Freetown and became the first Methodist missionary to African indigenous people.

He published his autobiography in 1798, which was one of only three by Black Nova Scotians and also notable among slave narratives as a work that was trans-Atlantic. King, who had been born a slave in South Carolina, was apprenticed as a carpenter. He joined the British when they occupied Charleston, as they promised freedom to slaves.

== Early life and education ==
Boston King was born in South Carolina, the son of a literate slave taken from Africa. His mother knew of herbal preparations from the Native Americans. Boston first joined the British near Charleston; after surviving smallpox, he made his way to New York during the American Revolution, twice escaping capture. In New York, he met and married Violet, an enslaved woman from North Carolina who had also joined the British. They had each made their way to New York on the promise of freedom for their contribution to the war effort. The Kings were among the 3,000 black American slaves who were given certificates of freedom, entered into the Book of Negroes, and evacuated with the British; they were resettled in Nova Scotia.

== Migration to Nova Scotia ==
King, a master carpenter, helped to form a community with his wife in Birchtown, where he worked a number of odd jobs to survive. The Black Loyalists especially struggled through the early years of the colony; there were delays in their land grants and supplies, and it turned out that the soil was too poor to support much farming. Before the Kings decided to leave Nova Scotia, Boston King was appointed as Methodist minister to a congregation at Preston, near Halifax.

== Immigration to Sierra Leone ==
Although conditions were improving for them in Nova Scotia, King and his wife decided to immigrate to the new British colony, the Province of Freedom (now Sierra Leone) in 1792. It was established for blacks from London and Canada. The Black Canadians, numbering nearly 1200 and traveling on several ships, established their own settlement of Freetown, Sierra Leone. Violet King died of fever soon after arrival.

At first Boston was employed by the company to preach to the native Africans in Sierra Leone, despite the fact that he could not understand their language. Soon he opened a school, later traveling to England to be schooled himself as a teacher.

In 1794, the Sierra Leone Company sent King to England for education as a teacher and missionary at the Methodist Kingswood School near Bristol. He returned to Sierra Leone in 1796 to teach other settlers and act as a missionary to local native peoples. During that period, he wrote his autobiography, which was published in London.

== Marriage and family ==
King married again in Sierra Leone after Violet died of malaria. While serving as a missionary to the Sherbro people, who were located in the coastal area about 100 miles south of Freetown, he and his second wife died about 1802. King was survived by two sons and a daughter, according to the 1802 census of Sierra Leone.

== Autobiography ==
While studying in Bristol, England, he wrote an autobiography, Memoirs of the Life of Boston King (1798), which was published in four installments in the Wesleyan Methodist Magazine in London. It was one of the genre of African American slave narratives, notable as one of three by Black Nova Scotians and one that spanned the Atlantic, as he wrote about his emigration to Sierra Leone. A new edition was published as The Life of Boston King, Black Loyalist, Minister, and Master Carpenter (2003), by Nimbus Publishing Ltd. and the Nova Scotia Museum.
