= Henry Beverhout =

African-Caribbean Metrologist Minister

Henry Beverhout was an African-Caribbean methodist minister who led a company of Nova Scotian settlers who settled in Sierra Leone.

Beverhout was an African-Caribbean person born free in St Croix, an island in the Danish West Indies. He moved to Charleston, South Carolina but aligned himself with the Black Loyalists with whom he migrated to New Brunswick, Canada, following the defeat of the British in the American War of Independence. Here he organised a methodist congregation which joined the migration to Sierra Leone in Halifax, Nova Scotia. He became the leader or captain of a "company", a social unit of self-government the Nova Scotian settlers developed and was to become a vociferous critic of the Sierra Leone Company after the settlers had arrived in Africa.

His daughter, Ann, married the Anglican missionary Gustavus Reinhold Nyländer. A second daughter, Frances, married another Anglican missionary, Charles Wenzel.
