= Birchtown, Nova Scotia =

Birchtown
- Community
- Location of Birchtown, Nova Scotia
- Coordinates: 43.744444°N 65.3825°W
- Country: Canada
- Province: Nova Scotia
- County: Shelburne
- Municipal district: Shelburne

Population (2011)
  - Total: 200
- Time zone: UTC-4 (AST)
  - Summer (DST): UTC-3 (ADT)
- Postal code(s): B0T 1W0
- Area code: 902
- Access Routes: Trunk 3

Birchtown is a community and National Historic Site in the Canadian province of Nova Scotia, located near Shelburne in the Municipal District of Shelburne County. Founded in 1783, the village was the largest settlement of Black Loyalists and the largest free settlement of ethnic Africans in North America in the eighteenth century. The two other significant Black Loyalist communities established in Nova Scotia were Brindley town and Tracadie. Birchtown was named after British Brigadier General Samuel Birch, an official who helped lead the evacuation of Black Loyalists from New York. (Note: Also named after the general was a much smaller settlement of Black Loyalists in Guysborough County, Nova Scotia called Birchtown.)

== Creation ==
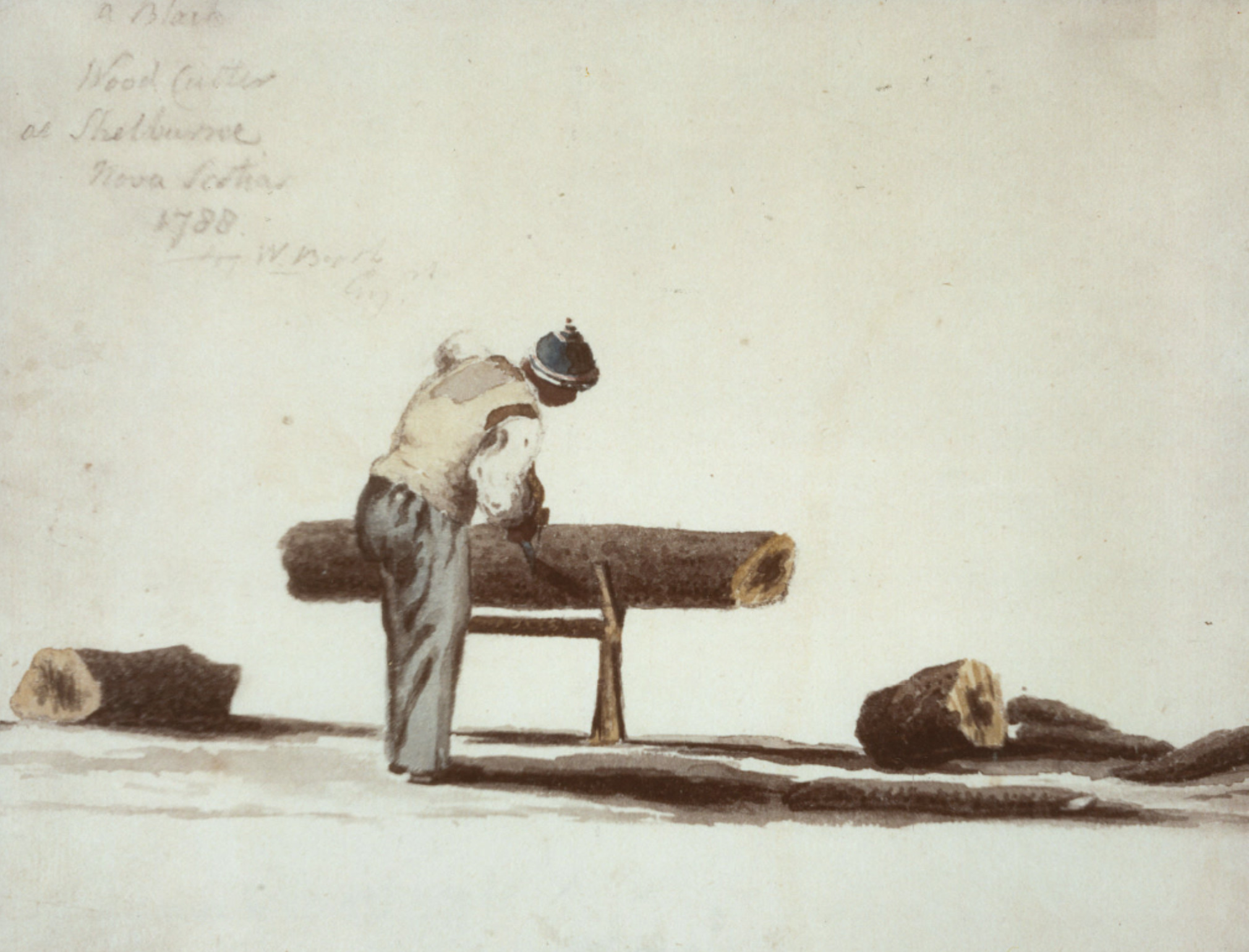
1788 illustration of a Black woodcutter in Shelburne, Nova Scotia

Birchtown was first settled by Stephen Blucke, who has been referred to as "the true founder of the Afro-Nova Scotian community". Birchtown was the major settlement area of the African Americans known as Black Loyalists who escaped to the British lines during the American War of Independence. These were Africans who escaped from slavery and fought for the British during the war. The majority of Nova Scotian settlers who later immigrated to the new colony of Sierra Leone in 1792 were such African Americans who had lived first in Birchtown. Most of Birchtown's black population entered Nova Scotia through the nearby town of Port Roseway, soon renamed Shelburne. Brigadier General Samuel Birch recorded the names of these African-American settlers in the Book of Negroes. They were issued passports which established their freedom; these were signed by General Birch, and became known as General Birch Certificates.

The core of the settlement were five companies of the Black Pioneers who were Black Americans who helped the British forces during the American War of Independence. More than two thirds of the Black population who immigrated to Canada were from the American South. Birchtown was acknowledged as being the largest settlement of free African Americans in the world by newspapers in New York City and in London. Birchtown's population grew further in July 1784 when free Black women and men who lived in Shelburne were attacked by whites in the Shelburne Riots. Many black individuals, such as the clergyman David George, fled to Birchtown for safety.

== The departure for Sierra Leone ==
Poor land, inadequate supplies, harsh climate, discrimination and broken promises of assistance led many Birchtown residents (led by Thomas Peters) to petition the British Government for a remedy. As a result of these grievances, many Birchtown residents chose to accept Britain's offer and join a 1792 migration to found a free ethnic African settlement in Sierra Leone in West Africa. The majority of black individuals who left for Sierra Leone were from Birchtown. Of the ones who left for Sierra Leone, 600 were from the Birchtown and Digby areas, 220 were from Preston, 200 were from New Brunswick, and 180 were from the Annapolis-Digby area. Fifty-five had been born into slavery in Virginia. The descendants of the settlers form part of the Sierra Leone Creole ethnicity.

== Later history ==
Although the population of Birchtown was greatly reduced by the migration to Sierra Leone, many settlers remained. They formed the ancestral basis of the Black Nova Scotian population of Shelburne County today. Employment opportunities in the nearby town of Shelburne attracted many families to move to Shelburne in later years.

Birchtown stayed as a small rural community of a few hundred based on farming, fishing and forestry. A two-room schoolhouse was built in 1829. A new eight-room school was built in 1959.

Birchtown was declared a National Historic Site in 1997. A seasonal museum complex commemorating the Black Loyalists was opened in that year by the Black Loyalist Heritage Society; it included the historic Birchtown school and church. The offices and archives of the museum were largely destroyed by an arson attack in 2006. The remaining archives were moved to temporary quarters on the site.

A new facility, the Black Loyalist Heritage Centre, opened its doors in June 2015; it tells the story of the Black Loyalists in America, Nova Scotia and Sierra Leone through their staff and interactive digital displays.

== In literature ==
The community's history of being given freedom by the British was the subject to British historian Simon Schama's non-fiction book Rough Crossings, which won the National Book Critics Circle Award. Lawrence Hill wrote a novel, The Book of Negroes, whose fictional narrator, Aminata Diallo, resides in Birchtown and describes its founding.

== Notable residents ==
- Stephen Blucke - "founder of Afro-Nova Scotian community"
- David George - African-American Baptist preacher who founded Silver Bluff Baptist Church
- Boston King, first Methodist missionary to African indigenous people
- John Marrant - the first African-American preacher; a Methodist
- Moses Wilkinson - African- American Methodist preacher

== See also ==
- Hartz Point
- List of communities in Nova Scotia
- John Clarkson (abolitionist)
- Sierra Leone Creole people
