= John Clarkson (abolitionist) =

Royal Navy officer, colonial administrator and abolitionist (1764–1828)

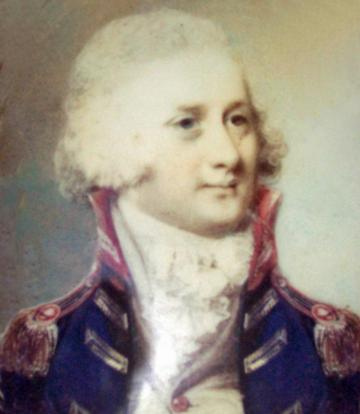
- c. 1791 miniature portrait of Clarkson
- Born: 4 April 1764; Wisbech, Isle of Ely
- Died: 2 April 1828 (aged 63); Woodbridge, Suffolk
- Occupations: Naval officer, colonial administrator
- Known for: Founding Freetown, Sierra Leone
- Spouse: Susannah Lee
- Children: 10
- Parents: Rev. John Clarkson; Anne
- Relatives: Thomas Clarkson (brother)
- Military career
- Allegiance: Great Britain
- Branch: Royal Navy
- Service years: c. 1777–
- Rank: Lieutenant
- Unit: HMS Monarch
- Conflicts: American War of Independence

Lieutenant John Clarkson (4 April 1764 – 2 April 1828) was a Royal Navy officer, colonial administrator and abolitionist. He was the younger brother of Thomas Clarkson, one of the central figures in the British abolitionist movement. As a Sierra Leone Company agent, John Clarkson was instrumental in the founding of Freetown, Sierra Leone as a haven for chiefly formerly enslaved African Americans first relocated to Nova Scotia by British military authorities following the American War of Independence.

Clarkson not only founded Freetown, but was also the first governor of the settlement. Because of his work in establishing Freetown, Clarkson is considered to be one of the founding fathers of Sierra Leone, alongside Granville Sharp, Thomas Peters and Henry Thornton. To this day, the last prayer by Clarkson at Freetown can be found in the houses of Creoles and other Sierra Leoneans alike. To the Nova Scotians, 'Governor Clarkson' was both 'Father' and their 'Moses' who delivered them into the promised land.

Clarkson became a pacifist in 1816 and, together with his brother Thomas, became a founder of the Society for the Promotion of Permanent and Universal Peace.

== Early life and career in the navy ==
Clarkson was the second son of Rev. John Clarkson, headmaster of Wisbech Grammar School in Cambridgeshire. He was born in the Headmaster's house and, despite the early death of his father, continued to attend the school until 1777 when, aged 12, he entered the Royal Navy as a midshipman on Captain Joshua Rowley's ship HMS Monarch. Serving in the American War of Independence, Clarkson was commissioned as a lieutenant in 1783.

He served primarily in the West Indies and observed at first hand the brutality and inhumanity of the Atlantic slave trade. Initially unmoved by what he had witnessed he later, likely influenced by his brother Thomas' passionate views concerning the immorality of slavery, came to abhor the institution and rendered practical assistance to the cause of abolition.

== Mission to America ==
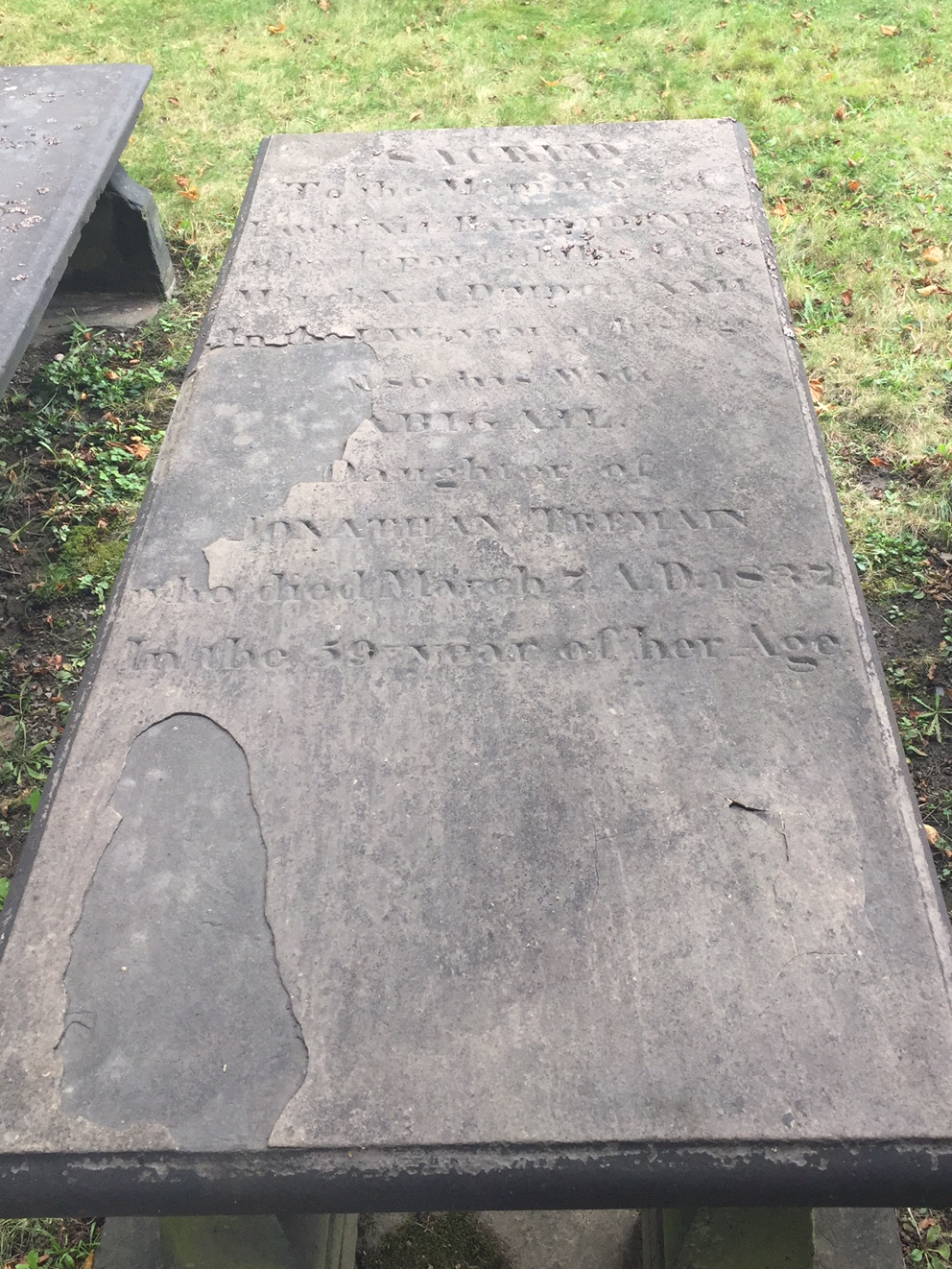
The gravestone of Lawrence Hartshorne, a Quaker who was the chief assistant of John Clarkson in Nova Scotia.

His brother Thomas, along with William Wilberforce and other members of the Committee for Effecting the Abolition of the Slave Trade, had incorporated the Sierra Leone Company with a view to resettling certain free and formerly enslaved blacks on the west coast of Africa. Lieutenant Clarkson's charge was to secure among black communities of Nova Scotia, Canada, volunteers to settle in the area of the mouth of the Sierra Leone River.

The blacks in Nova Scotia were chiefly former African-American slaves, relocated there after the American Revolutionary War, known as Black Loyalists. They had escaped to the British and fought alongside them to secure their own freedom. The British promised resettlement, land and provisions for the first year. Despite promises from the military, the settlements were underfunded, and authorities tended to favor white Loyalists, especially those from the South who had brought slaves with them to Nova Scotia, complicating the social situation. They competed with the freedmen for land and power.

After arriving in Nova Scotia from England in October 1791, Clarkson worked with the Black Loyalist leader Thomas Peters and gathered a group of close to 1,200 African Nova Scotians who wanted to leave for better opportunities in Sierra Leone. Some wanted to return home, having been kidnapped and enslaved from Africa as children. They departed in fifteen ships for Africa on 15 January 1792, meeting terrible conditions at sea. After a harrowing transatlantic passage in winter, the flotilla of 15 ships arrived in Sierra Leone in March 1792. The Africans from Nova Scotia, who became known as the Nova Scotian Settlers, established Freetown. Clarkson remained at the settlement until returning to England at the end of December 1792. He served as governor from August 1792 until his departure.

== The founding of Freetown, and Governor of Sierra Leone ==
Clarkson was noted to be respected by the Settlers and even among the Creole people and is remembered as a fair administrator. Clarkson was a popular governor of Sierra Leone and was noted to be respected by the Nova Scotians. From his work with the settlers in Nova Scotia and Sierra Leone, he grew to have great respect for them and struggled to ensure the company representatives did not take advantage of them.

His advocacy for the settlers upon his return to England and recrimination of the company's actions, or lack thereof, resulted in his final dismissal by the company. Clarkson had submitted objections to actions of the company that were inconsistent with the representations and assurances he had made to the settlers. Clarkson never returned to Freetown but he received settlers who traveled to England to fight for their rights in the colony. They succeeded in carving out a political community and rights for themselves even with governors who were much less flexible than Clarkson.

== Later life ==
On April 24, 1793, John married Susan Lee, the daughter of a wealthy banker. They moved to Purfleet, Essex and John took charge of the estate of Mr. Whitbread, a local brewery. He also became the manager of Whitbread's chalk and lime quarry. The couple had ten children, six of whom died in childhood. From 1816 to 1819 he was treasurer of the Peace Society. In 1820 he left the Whitbread Company and became a banker at Woodbridge, Suffolk, not far from his brother's home in Playford.

== Death and legacy ==
Clarkson died on 2 April 1828 in Woodbridge, Suffolk, and was buried in the churchyard of St Mary's. The unassuming Clarkson's last words in reaction to a report of the unrelenting abuse of slaves in the West Indies were reported to be, "It is dreadful to think, after my brother and his friends have been working for forty years that such things should still be."

Clarkson was portrayed by Stephen Campbell Moore in the BBC television drama documentary Rough Crossings (2007).

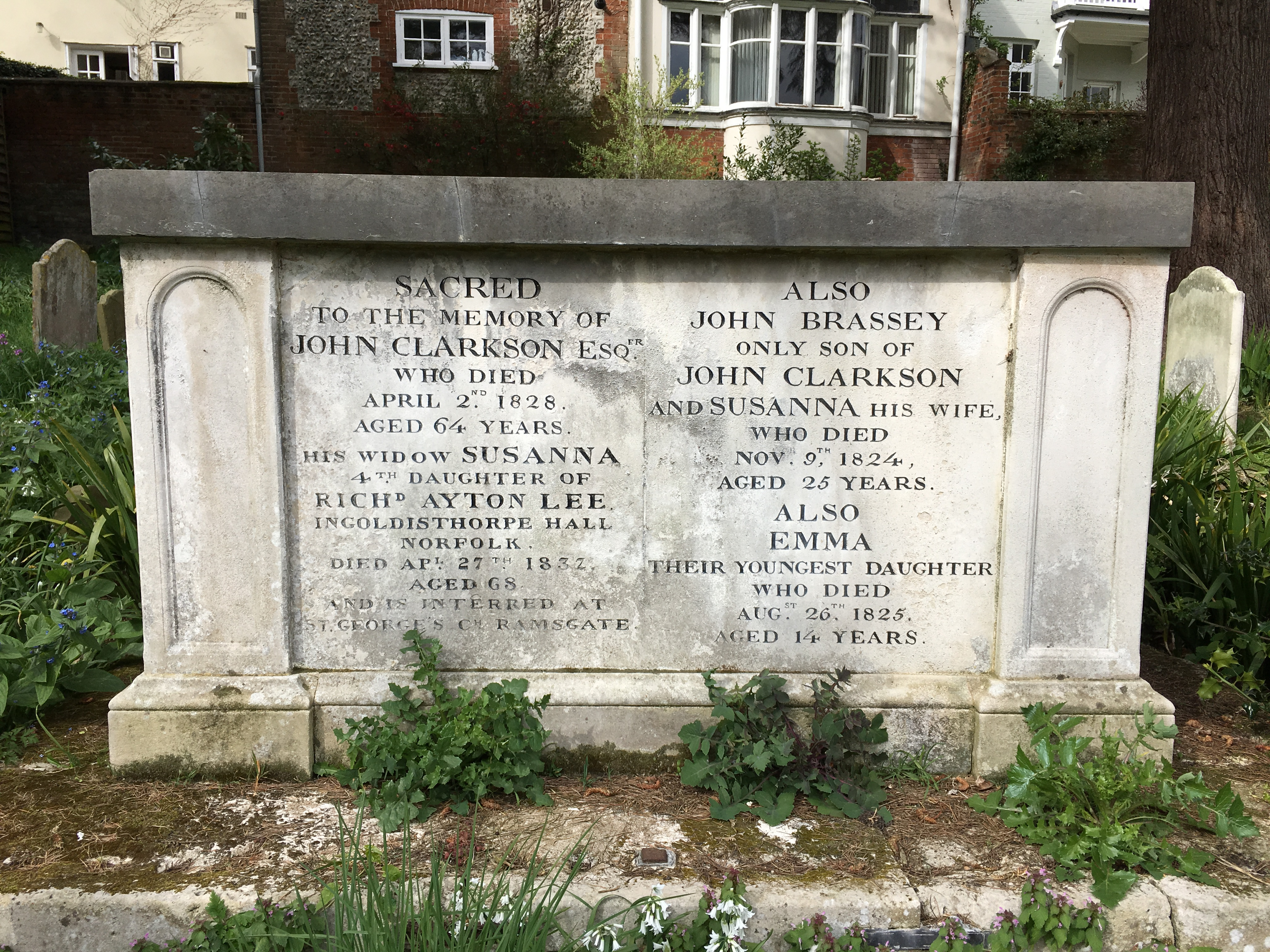
The grave of John Clarkson in the graveyard of St Mary the Virgin, Woodbridge
