= Rough Crossings =

2005 history book about slavery and the USA, by Simon Schama

Rough Crossings: Britain, the Slaves and the American Revolution
- Author: Simon Schama
- Language: English
- Subject: History
- Genre: Non-fiction
- Publisher: BBC Books
- Publication date: 2005
- Publication place: United Kingdom
- Media type: Print (book)
- Pages: 445
- ISBN: 0-06-053916-X
- OCLC: 61652611
- Dewey Decimal: 326.0973/09033 22
- LC Class: E269.N3 S33 2006

Rough Crossings: Britain, the Slaves and the American Revolution is a history book by Simon Schama. It was the 2006 National Book Critics Circle Award winner for general nonfiction. A 2007 drama-documentary television programme was based on it.

== Synopsis ==
Rough Crossings gives an account of the history of thousands of African-American slaves who escaped slavery in the American colonies to fight for the British cause during the American Revolutionary War. It tells of the legal battles which established that slavery was not valid in England itself, and how the British government offered freedom to enslaved African Americans if they would fight for Britain and King George III. The book discusses the many ambiguities involved—some white Loyalists were slaveowners, and some blacks were recruited for the War of Independence.

Rough Crossings then follows the fate of the Black Loyalists after the war's end, who, following the British defeat, were sent to Nova Scotia (then still a colony within British North America), where they received a cold welcome, including suffering the first race riots on the continent. Some remained in Nova Scotia, but others returned to Africa to settle in what was to become Sierra Leone. The descendants of those who settled in Freetown are part of the Sierra Leone Creole people, with strong ancestral ties with the United States, the Caribbean, and Canada.

== Reception ==
The reviews were very favourable.

Alex Butterworth wrote in The Guardian:

The early chapters of Rough Crossings still bear traces of the television habit - the scene-setting rhetoric, a tendency to over-emphasis [sic] vivid 'moments', precise character thumbnail ... As the book weaves through London, America, Nova Scotia and Africa, though, Schama's technique relaxes, to be laid, most strikingly, at the service of the book's black characters. ... At the end of this immaculately controlled, brave and important work, only the most callous of readers could fail to shed a tear.

James Walvin, in his Guardian review, stated:

Parts of the story have been well rehearsed by earlier historians, but never like this. One of Schama's great talents is the ability to fit together distinct episodes into a much broader and more telling narrative. He also brings to the story his characteristic flair and historical imagination.

The New York Times' Brent Staples praised the book as well, describing it as "a stirringly ambitious reconsideration of the Revolution with the question of slavery set at the very heart of the matter".

== Adaptations ==
In 2007, BBC Two aired the drama-documentary Rough Crossings, based on Schama's book. A reviewer stated that the "success of this endeavour is unfortunately limited as the programme fails to inform its audience which this history should be remembered apart from its perceived strangeness and neglect". "The programme's weakness in delivering an effective message is also let down in its use of Schama's pieces to camera and the dramatic reconstructions of the story." The two halves of the production, with "different styles", "do not sit well together".

It was released to DVD by BBC Home Entertainment.

In 2007, Headlong Theatre produced a stage adaptation, adapted by Caryl Phillips, which toured the UK. The British Theatre Guide review stated, "This play attempts to take a big book with many strands and meld them into a satisfying three hour play", but "is too diffuse to make for a coherent drama".

== See also ==
- Slavery in the colonial United States
- Abolitionism in the United Kingdom
- History of Sierra Leone
- Book of Negroes, a historical document
- The Book of Negroes (2007), a fictional telling of this story
