= Cornelius Hatfield =

Cornelius Hatfield may refer to:

- Cornelius Hatfield Jr. (c. 1755–1823), Loyalist spy, guide, intelligence gatherer, and raider in the American Revolution
- Cornelius Forman Hatfield (1828–1910), merchant, shipbuilder, ship owner and political figure in Nova Scotia, Canada
