= Stephen Blucke =

Black Loyalist commander of the American Revolutionary War

- Born: c. 1752; Barbados, British Empire
- Died: after 1796; British Canada, British Empire
- Occupations: soldier and teacher
- Years active: 1777–1792
- Title: Colonel
- Spouse: Margaret Coventry
- Children: Isabel Gibbons
- Military career
- Allegiance: Kingdom of Great Britain
- Branch: British Army
- Service years: 1775–1783
- Rank: Colonel (honorary rank)
- Commands: Black Company of Pioneers (1777-1780) and Black Brigade (1780-1783)
- Conflicts: American Revolutionary War: Raids in Monmouth County, Province of New Jersey (1779-1780)

Signature
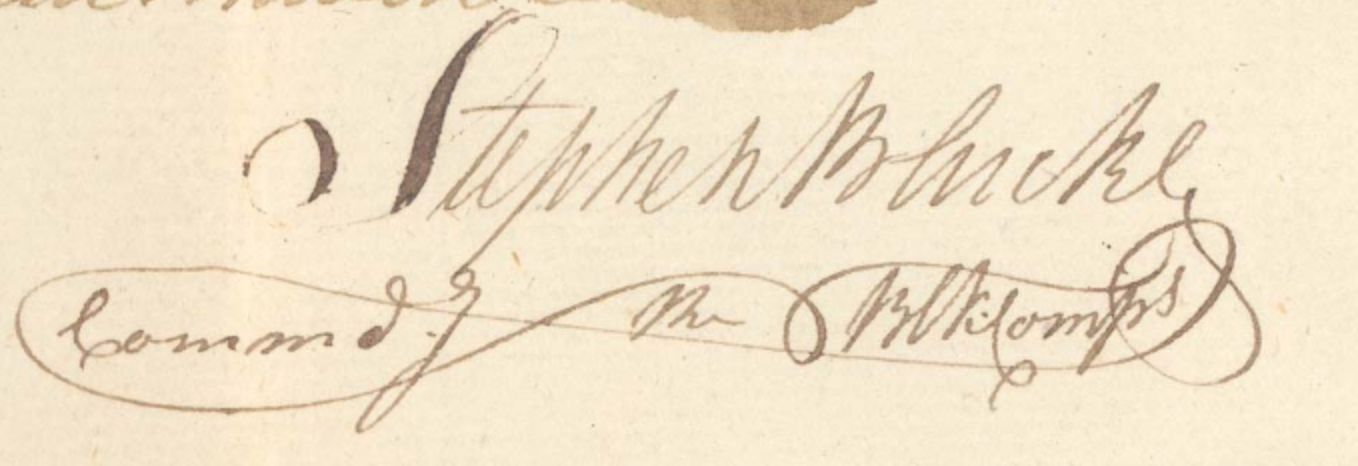

Stephen Blucke or Stephen Bluck (born c. 1752–after 1796) was a Black Loyalist in the American Revolutionary War and one the commanding officers of the British Loyalist provincial unit, the Black Company of Pioneers. He was one of 3,000 people who left New York for Nova Scotia on British ships. He settled in a town designed for African-Americans, Birchtown, Nova Scotia. He was a leader in the town, called a magistrate and commissioned as lieutenant colonel of the Black Militia of the greater Shelburne district by Governor John Parr. He worked with a surveyor to identify the area that would become Birchtown and was involved in coordinating labour for roads and other public works. He lived the life of a middle-class person while his neighbors lived a life of poverty. He had a substantial well-built house, while most people lived in simple housing. He was a go-between for employment of some of the townspeople in labor or similar jobs.

When Blucke arrived in Birchtown, he was a married man with an adopted daughter and a man servant. Within a few years, he developed a relationship with the adopted daughter and his wife moved back to New York. He later had a daughter with his adopted daughter, Isabel, who took his surname. Birchtown's population decreased significantly when many of the townspeople left for Sierra Leone in 1792. Once a schoolteacher, he closed the school after several years because there were so few students. He left Birchtown quietly about 1796 or 1797.

== Early and personal life ==
Stephen Blucke, born about 1752, was a literate mulatto, the son of a black mother and a white father from Barbados. After he came to the colonies he made his way to New Jersey, where he became acquainted with Stephen Skinner, later a prominent citizen of Port Roseway. Blucke fought with the British against the rebelling colonists.

He married Margaret, born about 1743, a black woman who had been born free in the household of Mrs. Coventry in New York. She also purchased her own freedom when she was 14 years of age. Most of her family were free and financially comfortable. Margaret purchased Isabel Gibbons from Mrs. Coventry's daughter to free her and she became Stephen and Margaret's adopted daughter. Isabel was born about 1763. Living in the Birchtown, Nova Scotia household in 1784 were Stephen, Margaret, Isabel, Richard Wilkinson, and William Monday. There were nine other households in Blucke's Company. Richard Wilkinson what Blucke's servant who may have traveled with them from New York. Blucke's mother came to live with him in Birchtown by 1789.

While in Birchtown, Nova Scotia, Blucke became involved with Isabel. Margaret left her husband around 1788 and moved to New York. Margaret wrote to Rev. Mr. John Marrant, a free black minister who was often in Birchtown, from New York asking for information about Isabel, who she called a "poor unhappy girl" and asked whether Isabel could be removed from Blucke's household, optimally to Boston. She had previously written to Blucke to let her leave him, without a favorable response. (Note: Margaret lived at 40 Smith's Street in New York, perhaps near her sister, who was Peter Gray's mother. Peter seemed to live in the Birchtown area.) In 1788, Blucke had also become unpopular because it was believed that he misappropriated funds. Stephen and Isabel had a daughter, Frances by April 21, 1796, when Frances was baptized at the Anglican Church and Isabel took Blucke's surname.

== American Revolutionary war ==
During the American Revolution, Black Loyalist and guerrilla leader Colonel Tye died in 1780 and Stephen Blucke was given the honorary rank of "Colonel" and took command, of another Black Loyalist unit, a group of military associators, known as the infamous Black Brigade, until the end of the war. (Note: There are no regimental records for the Black Brigade or Black Pioneers, though, that mention Blucke. But, he was known as a leader of the blacks who came to Nova Scotia.) The Black Brigade was an elite group of guerillas within the Black Pioneers, who were a Black Loyalist company of soldiers who worked labor detail for the British Army. At first the Black Brigade fought independently, but later fought with the Queen's Rangers, an all white group of the British Army. The Black Brigade operated in Long Island, New York and in Monmouth County, New Jersey. They targeted specific people who they would kill or kidnap. Before he left for Nova Scotia, Blucke received his certificate of freedom from General Samuel Birch.

== Black and White Loyalists ==
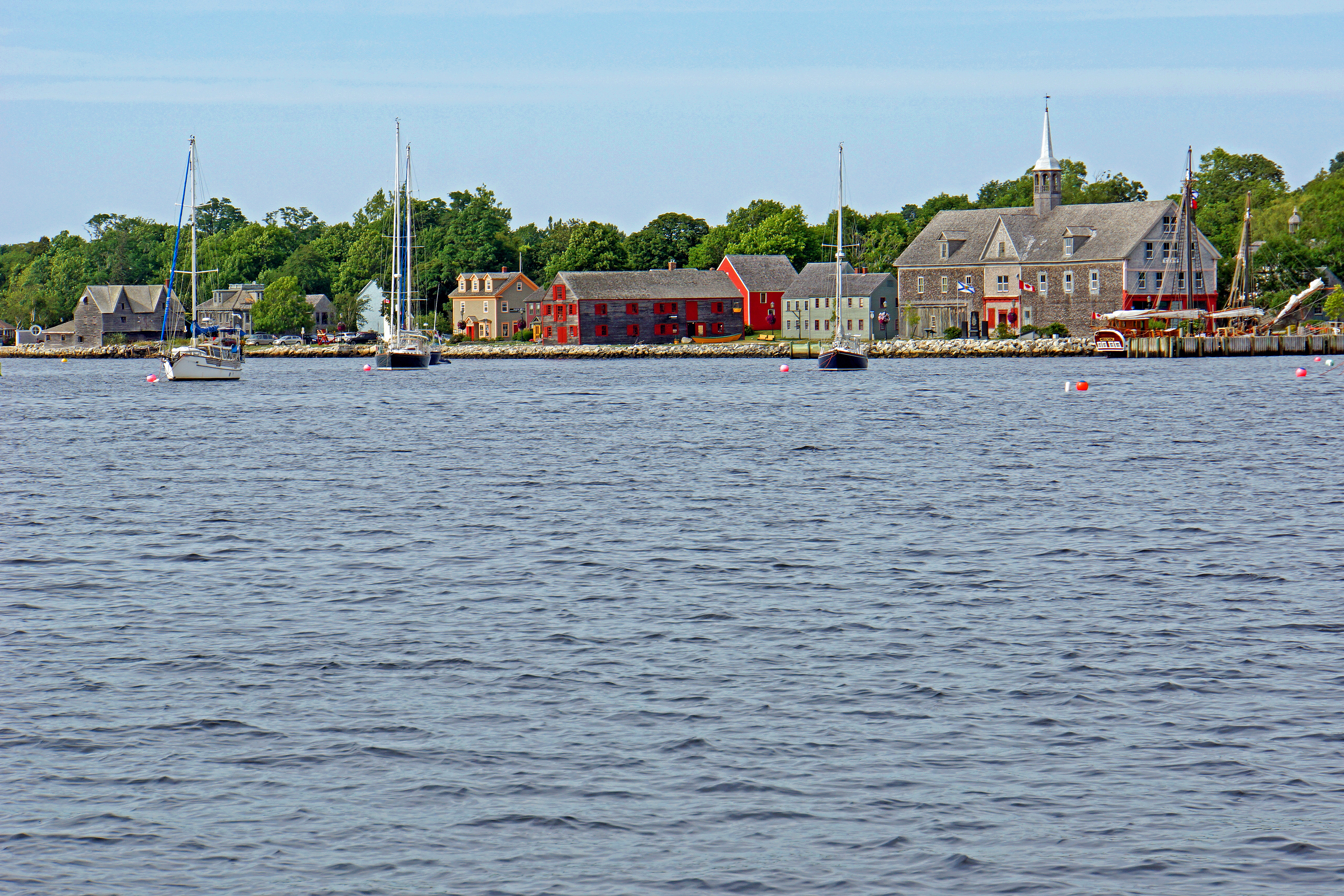
Port Rosey, now Shelburne, today

During the Revolutionary War, the British realized that they were outnumbered and promised freedom to any slaves of rebel colonists if they would serve behind their lines. Many slaves heard of the offer and about 30,000 slaves ran away from their owners to become cooks, pilots, laborers, musicians, and soldiers for the British Army.

A group of white Loyalists decided to flee the United States and settle at Port Roseway (now Shelburne, Nova Scotia). They formed the Port Roseway Associates. There were 3037 people, 415 of whom were servants, when they arrived at Port Roseway in May 1783. Of those, some of the servants were slaves.

== Nova Scotia settlement ==
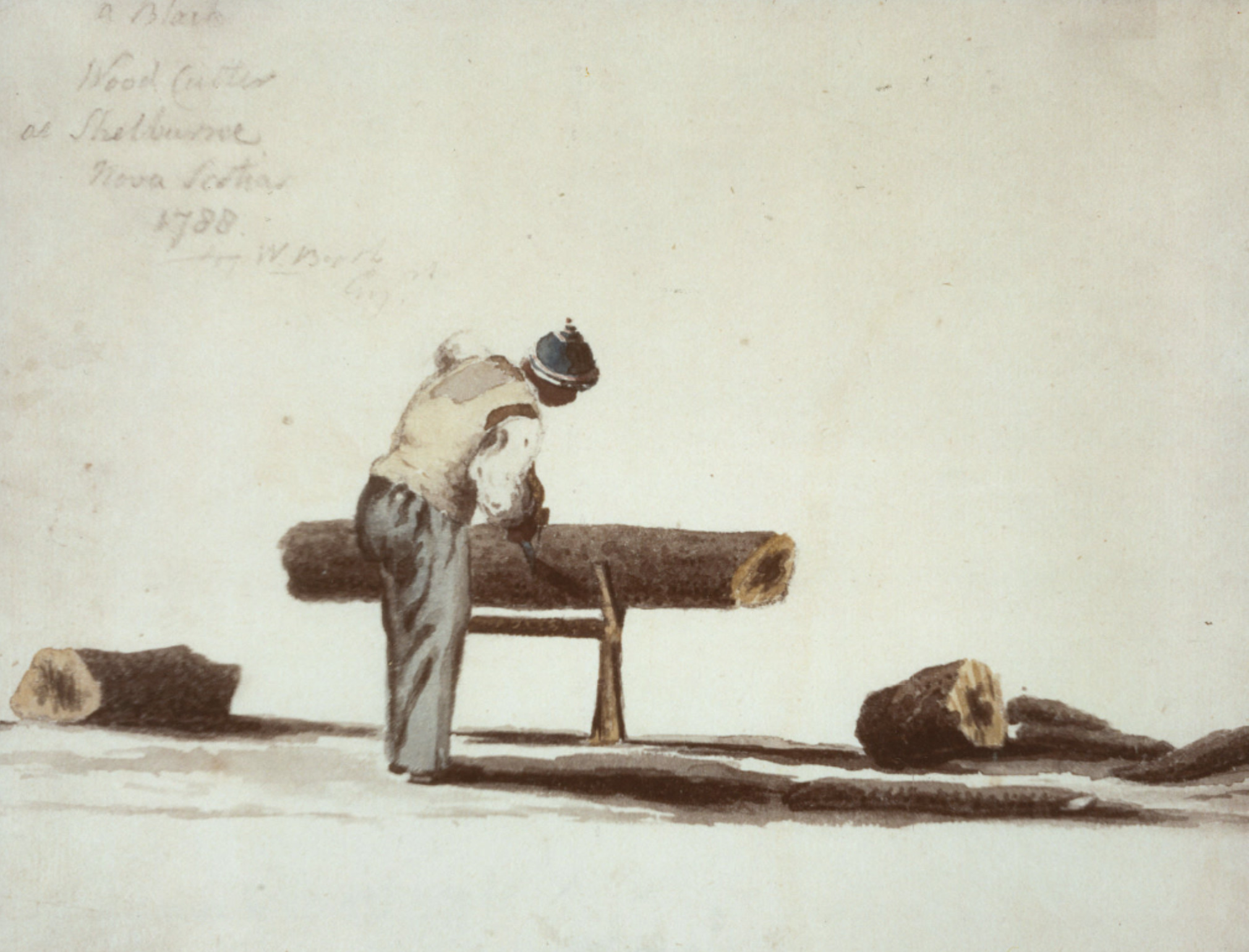
1788 illustration of a Black woodcutter in Shelburne, Nova Scotia

One of about 3,000 free or emancipated Black Loyalists eligible to go to Nova Scotia, he came to The Maritimes in British Canada in August 1783 aboard the L'Abondance. He first settled with several hundred Black Pioneers in Port Roseway (now Shelburne, Nova Scotia). With Benjamin Marston, the chief surveyor, he identified the parcel of land to be used for the blacks. It was near a swamp and the land and the bay had sharp granite rocks. It is suggested that he may have accepted that land to avoid getting into a conflict with wealthy whites and to expedite getting settled. Six companies of African Americans were formed. Each company had a captain, and they were all under the leadership of Stephen Blucke. On September 3, 1783, they began to establish themselves in what became Birchtown, Nova Scotia, named after Samuel Birch who signed the certificates for the Black Loyalists.

Birchtown was established specifically for people of African descent and its residents, including Blucke, were recorded in 1784 on the Birchtown Muster roll. (Note: His name was Colonel Bluke on the Birchtown Muster roll of 1874.) They built rough shelters that were not suitable for people from southern climates. Blucke constructed the only well-built house in Birchtown. There was a four-year delay in actually getting their land, residents received up to 40 acres, while Blucke had a 200-acre lot, likely because of his role coordinating activities with white and black communities. He may have also had some savings from the Revolutionary war. Although the soil in and around Birchtown was of poor quality for large-scale farming, Blucke had a substantial garden at his house.

Blucke built a boat so that he could fish. He developed a friendship with Stephen Skinner, a local merchant, who went through Blucke to hire blacks, most of whom did not receive their promised land and had to work as laborers or domestics. Some became sharecroppers. Skinner may have acted as Blucke's patron. There was an Anglican church in town, but to attend the church, members had to rent a pew. Blucke was the only resident who could afford to pay for the rental.

Birchtown held together for eight years, despite the famine, a violent race riot, widespread poverty, and the realisation that, despite being free, African-Nova Scotians were in a desperate fight for material and political equality.

Sometimes referred to as the "Birch Magistrate", he helped people petition the authorities, witnessed the sale of property, and enforced a level of justice. Governor John Parr of Nova Scotia commissioned him as lieutenant-colonel of the Black Militia in the Shelburne District in September 1784. Under his leadership, he ran the Black Militia, which performed public works, like building a road to Annapolis. He has been referred to as "the true founder of the Afro-Nova Scotian community".

He became a teacher and taught at one of the Bray Schools, for which he received a favorable review by the inspector of schools. After many of the blacks left Nova Scotia for Sierra Leone in early 1792, there were few students left and the schoolhouse closed in 1796. The remaining blacks, about one fifth of the original residents, left Birchtown for other areas, as there were few jobs or prospects by staying in Birchtown. In 1796 or 1797, Blucke quietly left Birchtown.

== Archaeological study ==
From the evidence found at the site of Blucke's house, he had a comfortable and substantial house, living the life of a middle-classed person while those around him in Birchtown were living a life of poverty. More than 13,000 artifacts were found during the archaeological excavation in 1998. The largest group of artifacts represented kitchen items used to prepare, store, or consume food and drinks. The next biggest portion of artifacts were architectural items used in the construction of the house. There were also tobacco pipe, clothing, arms, personal goods, and items for activities from the Blucke household. There were also some pre-contact artifacts of First Nations people. The articles are unique to other sites in Birchtown in that they are of particularly good quality, such as the quality of the kitchen ware, and the quantity of artifacts.

== See also ==
- Deborah Squash, another Black Loyalist who lived in Birchtown, Nova Scotia
