= Associators =

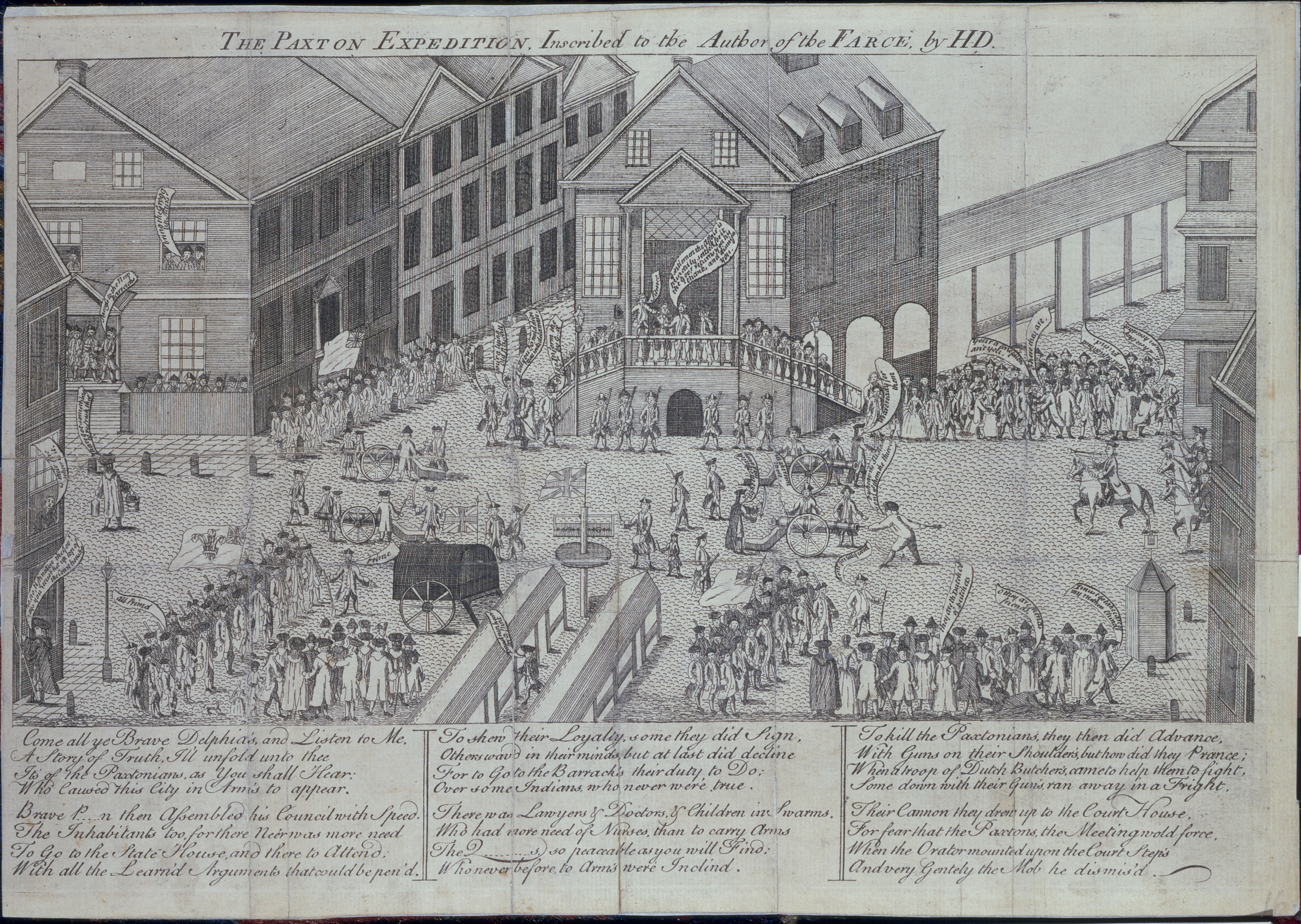
- 1764 illustration of the Pennsylvania Associators assembling in Philadelphia after news of the Paxton Boys marching on the city
- Active: 1689-1784
- Country: British America; United States
- Allegiance: Great Britain; United States
- Branch: Colonial militia, independent volunteers, military association, refugees, partisans, (auxiliary troops)
- Type: Infantry, dragoons (mounted infantry), artillery
- Size: Company-regiment
- Engagements: Maryland Protestant Rebellion (1689) King George's War (1744-1748) French and Indian War (1754-1763) American Revolutionary War (1775-1783)

Commanders
- Notable commanders: Maryland Colonial Governor Nehemiah Blakiston; Colonel Stephen Blucke; Captain Joseph Brant; Colonel Tye; Maryland Colonial Governor John Coode; Brigadier General Oliver De Lancey; Benjamin Franklin; Brigadier General Cortlandt Skinner

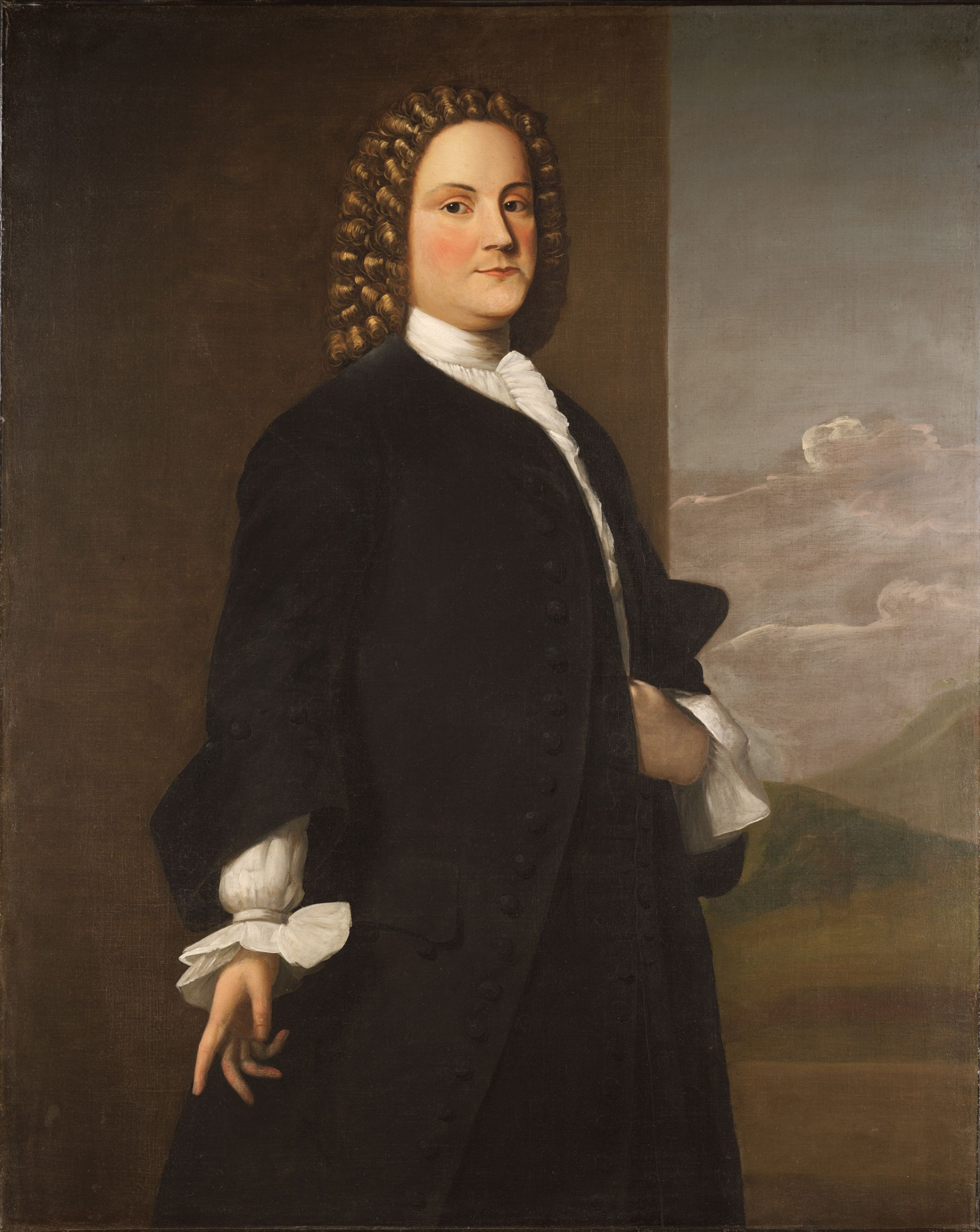
Benjamin Franklin, during King George's War, wrote and published the pamphlet, Plain Truth, calling for a voluntary association to defend Philadelphia.

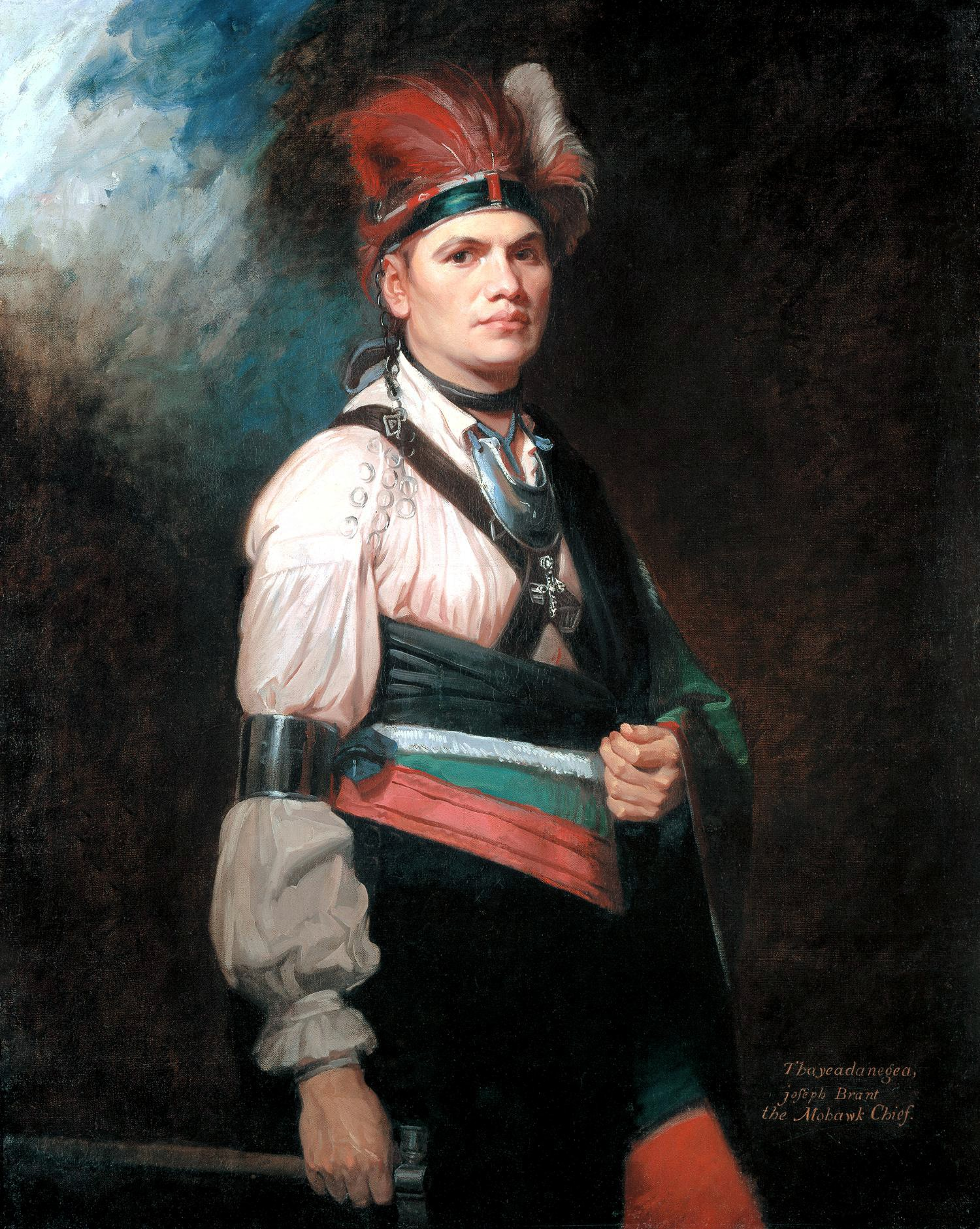
Joseph Brant, a Native American led Brant's Volunteers an irregular British Loyalist associators unit, of mixed Mohawk Indians and white soldiers raised during the American Revolutionary War who fought on the British side in the Province of New York.

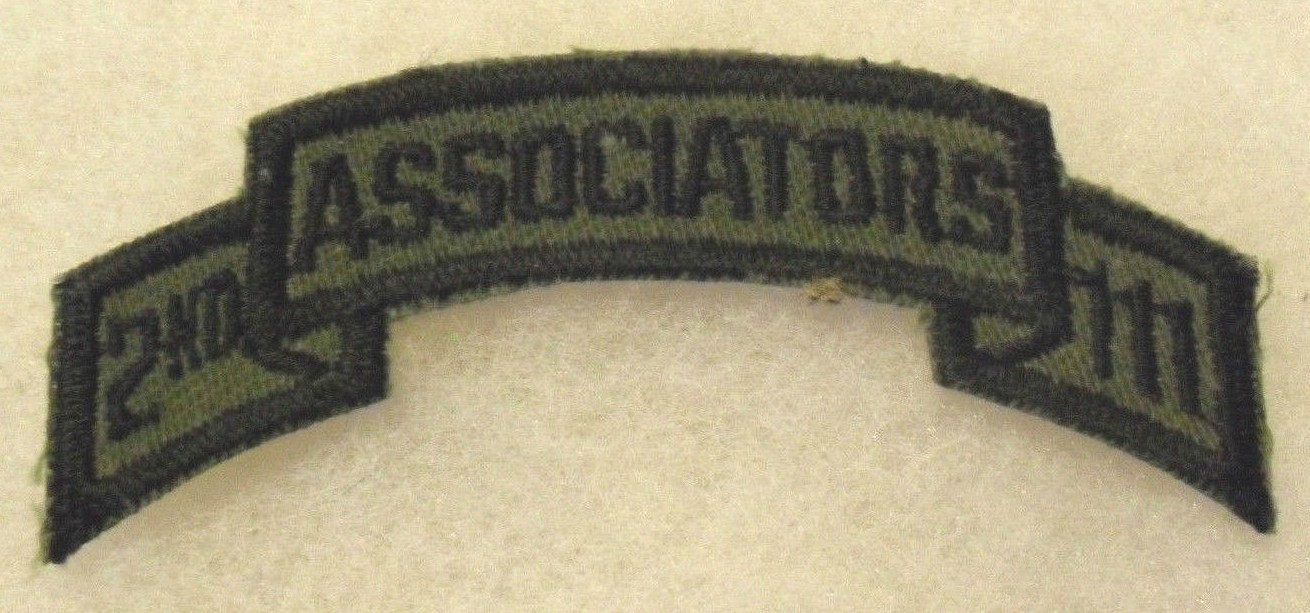
2nd Battalion, "Associators", Pennsylvania National Guard, U.S. Army 111th Infantry Regiment insignia patch

Associators were members of 17th- and 18th-century volunteer military associations in the British American thirteen colonies and British Colony of Canada. These were more commonly known as Maryland Protestant, Pennsylvania, and American Patriot and British Loyalist colonial militias. But unlike militias, the associator military volunteers were exempt from regular mandatory military service. Other names used to describe associators were "Associations", "Associated", "Refugees", "Volunteers", and "Partisans".

The term "Non-Associators" was applied to American colonists who refused to support and sign "military association" charters. They were not affiliated with associators, or would choose instead, to pay a fine and suffer possible retaliation. During the American Revolutionary War, some associator units were said to operate more like, or were in fact loose-knit criminal gangs, taking advantage of the disruption of warfare.

The present-day U.S. Army 111th Infantry Regiment Pennsylvania Army National Guard's 56th Stryker Brigade Combat Team, 28th Infantry Division is nicknamed the "Associators", helping to preserve the volunteer associators' ancestral legacy in Pennsylvania.

== Philadelphia and Pennsylvania Associators ==
During King George's War, Benjamin Franklin, in 1747, wrote and published the pamphlet, "Plain Truth", calling for a voluntary association to defend Philadelphia. This was in line with his earlier formation of volunteer fire-companies. This organization was formed and approved by the council and the officers would be commissioned by the Council President. In 1755 these groups were re-established in response to Braddock's defeat. The 103rd Engineer Battalion (United States) and the U.S. Army 111th Infantry Regiment Pennsylvania Army National Guard's 56th Stryker Brigade Combat Team, 28th Infantry Division, nicknamed the "Associators", traces their lineages to these Pennsylvania Associators.

== Associators in American Revolutionary War ==
=== American Patriot Associators ===
==== Province of Pennsylvania ====
In 1776, the Province of Pennsylvania's Patriot, volunteer, military groups, in the tradition of earlier, colonial, associator militias, used the name the Pennsylvania Associators. The following year, in 1777, it was renamed the Pennsylvania State Militia.

- Hanover Associators (1774)
- Bucks County Associators (1775-1776)
- Lancaster County Associators (1775)
- Northumberland County Associators (1776)
- Artillery Battalion, Pennsylvania Militia (Philadelphia) (1747)
- 4th Battalion of Philadelphia County Militia (1776)
- Philadelphia Brigade of Militia (1747)
- 2nd Battalion, Philadelphia Associators
- 3rd Battalion, Philadelphia Associators

=== British Loyalist Associators ===
Many Loyalist irregulars who fought with the British in the American Revolutionary War were "associators". These units were sometimes commissioned by the commander in chief but could also be commissioned by the commander of a garrison or a royal colonial governor. They received no pay, and often no uniforms; they were usually issued provisions, but relied on labor or looting to earn money. Loyalist Associators often served in mixed-race units, composed of whites, escaped slaves, and even American Indians.

Perhaps one of the most famous Loyalist associators was Colonel Tye, a former slave and leader of the infamous "Black Brigade". He was the first known black officer in North American military history.

==== Province of Georgia ====
- Augusta Associators (Augusta) (1781)

==== Province of Massachusetts ====
- Loyal American Association (Boston) (1775-1776)
- Loyal Associated Refugees (1779)
- Loyal Irish Volunteers (Boston) (1775-1776)
- Pepperell's Corps (Boston) (1779-?)
- Royal North British Volunteers (Boston) (1775-1776)

==== Province of Maryland ====
- Maryland Royal Retaliators (raised in Philadelphia) (1780-1781)

==== Province of New Jersey ====
- Associated Loyalists, also known as Governor Franklin's Associated Loyalists (1780–1782)
- Black Brigade (Black Loyalists) led by Colonel Tye and later, Colonel Stephen Blucke) (Monmouth County) (1779-1783)
- King’s Militia Volunteers (Monmouth County) (1779–1780)
- Pine Robbers (outlaw gangs) (New Jersey Pine Barrens) (1776–1783)
- Refugees (unit of New Jersey Royal Governor William Franklin's Associated Loyalists and Pine Robbers gang) (New Jersey Pine Barrens), (Ocean County) (1780–1782)

==== Province of New York ====
- Associated Refugees, also known as the King's American Regiment) (Long Island) (1776-1783)
- Brant's Volunteers (New York) (1777-1779)
- De Lancey's Refugees (also known as "Cowboys" and part of De Lancey's Brigade) (Long Island) (1776-1783)
- Hatfield's Company of Partisans (partisans irregulars led by Captain Cornelius Hatfield, Jr., and part of the New Jersey Volunteers (Skinner's Greens) (Long Island) (1779-1782)
- Hazard's Corps of Refugees (Long Island) (1780–1782)
- Loyal Refugee Volunteers (Albany) (1779–1782)

==== Province of Pennsylvania ====
- Doan Gang (outlaws) (Bucks County) (1774–1783)

==== Province of Rhode Island ====
- Loyal Newport Associators (also known as the Loyal Newport Volunteers) (Newport) (1777–1779)

==== Other Loyalist Associators ====
- Robins Company of Partisans (partisan irregulars) (1780-1782?)
- Sharp's Refugee Marines (marines - naval infantry force) (1779)
- James Stewart's Company of Refugees (1780-1781)
- Uzal Ward's Company of Refugees (1780-1783)

== Notable Associators ==
- Nehemiah Blakiston
- Stephen Blucke
- Peter Etter
- Joseph Brant
- Colonel Tye
- John Coode
- Oliver De Lancey
- Doan Brothers
- Benjamin Franklin
- Harpe Brothers
- Cortlandt Skinner

== See also ==
- Provincial troops in the French and Indian Wars

== Sources ==
- Farrelly, Maura Jane. Papist Patriots: The Making of an American Catholic Identity. Oxford: Oxford University Press, 2012.
- Newland, Samuel J. The Pennsylvania Militia: Defending the Commonwealth and the nation, 1669-1870. Commonwealth of Pennsylvania, Dept. of Military and Veterans Affairs, 2002.
- Ryan, William R. The World of Thomas Jeremiah: Charles Town on the Eve of the American Revolution. Oxford: Oxford University Press, 2010.
- Seymour, Joseph. The Pennsylvania Associators, 1747-1777. Yardley, PA: Westholme Publishing, 2012.
- Verenna, Thomas. "Explaining Pennsylvania's Militia", Journal of the American Revolution, June 17, 2014.
- List of British Loyalist Associators - The On-Line Institute for Advanced Loyalist Studies
