= Colonel Tye =

American Emancipated slave and Black Loyalist commander

Titus Cornelius
- Born: c. 1753; Colt's Neck, New Jersey, British America
- Died: September 1780 (aged c. 27); Monmouth County, New Jersey, United States
- Cause of death: Tetanus and lockjaw from gunshot wound
- Military career
- Allegiance: Great Britain
- Service years: 1778-1780
- Conflicts: American Revolutionary War Battle of Monmouth

Titus Cornelius, also known as Titus, Tye, and famously as Colonel Tye (c. 1753 – September 1780), was a enslaved man of African descent in the Province of New Jersey who escaped from his master and fought as a Black Loyalist during the American Revolutionary War; he was known for his leadership and fighting skills. He fought with a volunteer corps of escaped Virginia Colony slaves in the Ethiopian Regiment, and he led the Black Brigade associators. Tye died from tetanus from a musket wound in the wrist following a short siege in September 1780 against Captain Joshua Huddy. He was one of the most feared and effective guerrilla leaders opposing the American patriot forces in central New Jersey.

== Early life and slavery ==
Titus Cornelius was born into slavery in Colt's Neck, Monmouth County, New Jersey and originally owned by John Corlies, a Quaker. Corlies' farm was located along the Navesink River, near the town of Shrewsbury, and Titus was enslaved there in his early life. At the onset of the American Revolution, there were about 8,200 slaves in the New Jersey, second only to New York among the northern American colonies, in both the number and percentage of African Americans. Corlies, Titus's owner, held slaves despite his denomination's increasing opposition to slavery.

By the 1760s, it was Quaker practice to teach slaves how to read and write and to free them at age 21. Yet, Corlies gave his slaves "no learning [and was] not inclined to give them any". Known to be hard on his slaves, Corlies severely whipped them for minor causes. Corlies also kept his slaves past the age of 21, and was one of the last slaveholders in the region. In late 1775, a delegation from the Shrewsbury Meeting of the Society of Friends approached Corlies about his treatment of his slaves.

Later that year, Titus escaped from slavery and found exile with the British occupants of the colonies. A reward for his capture was put out by his master reading:

Run away from the subscriber, living in Shrewsbury, in the county of Monmouth, New Jersey, a Negroe man, named Titus, but may probably change his name; he is about 21 years of age, not very black, near 6 feet high; had on a grey homespun coat, brown breeches, blue and white stockings, and took with him a wallet, drawn up at one end with a string, in which was a quantity of clothes. Whoever takes said Negroe, and secures him in any jail, or brings him to me, shall be entitled to the above reward of Three Pounds, proc. And all reasonable charges paid by John Corlis.

The group of Quakers disapproved of Corlies' refusal to provide his slaves an education and his lack of adherence to the 1758 Quaker edict to end slavery. Corlies responded by saying that "he has not seen it his duty to give [the slaves] their freedom". Titus learned on his own about property, wealth, commodities, and the political leanings of the families in the area. Later, in 1778, the Society of Friends revoked Corlies' membership because of his unyielding refusal to emancipate his slaves.

== Prelude to Revolution ==
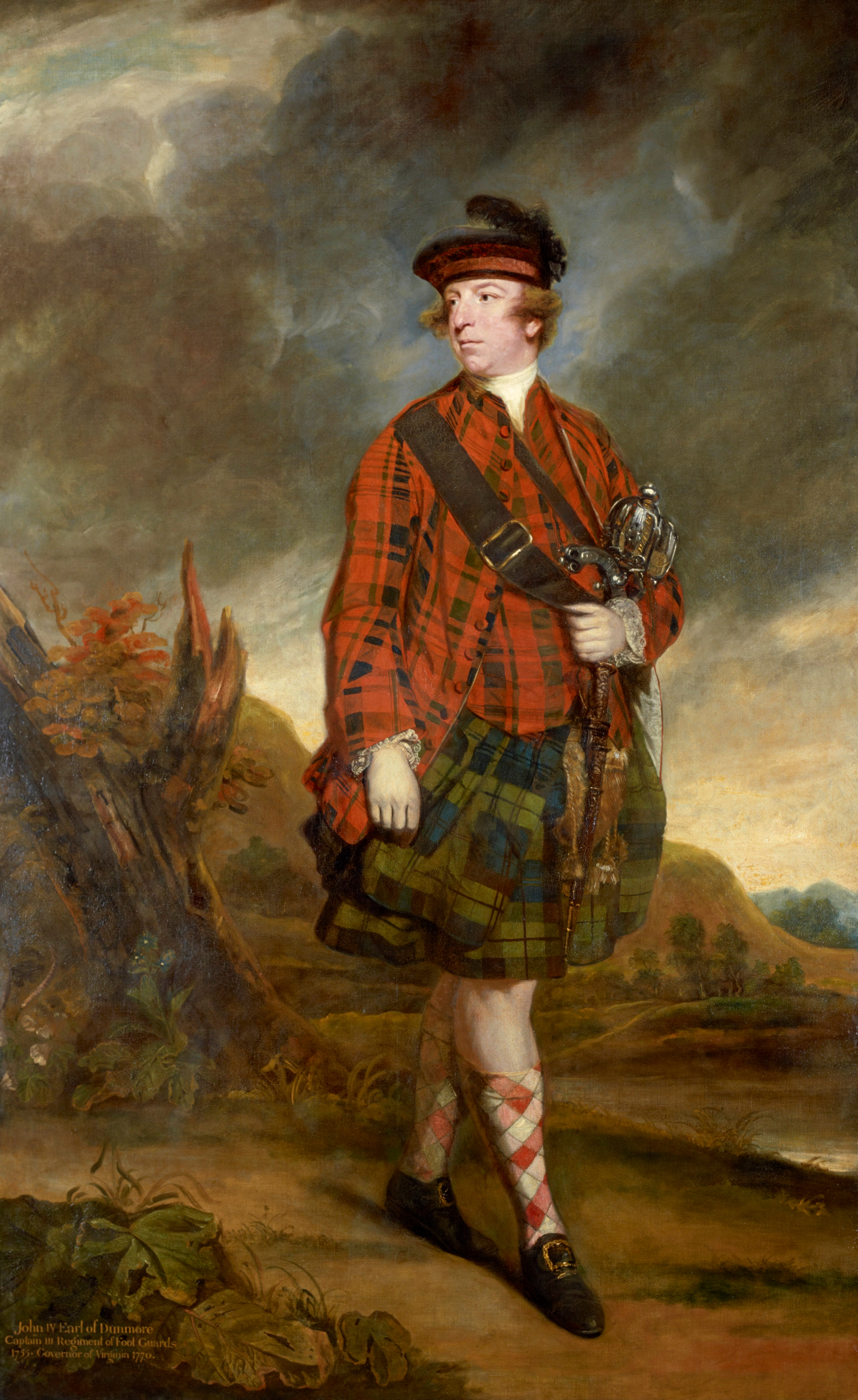
Lord Dunmore

In November 1775, John Murray, 4th Earl of Dunmore, the royal governor of Virginia, issued a proclamation offering freedom to all slaves and indentured servants who would leave American masters and join the British cause to suppress the insurrection. Lord Dunmore's act successfully prompted conspiracy among slaves in the Atlantic region, as many African Americans left their rebel masters to join the British. The proclamation and the disruption of the war contributed to an estimated nearly 100,000 slaves escaping during the Revolution, some to join the British. Planters considered Dunmore's offer a "diabolical scheme"; it contributed to their support for the Patriot cause.

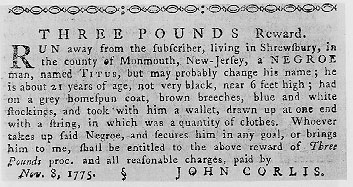
John Corlies's runaway advertisement for Tye

Titus Cornelius coincidentally escaped from Corlies' property the day after Dunmore's proclamation and he joined British forces. Titus observed the Quakers' unsuccessful attempts to persuade Corlies to free his slaves. Reaching his twenty-first birthday also inspired Titus to escape, as it marked the age when most Quakers freed their slaves. Carrying only a small amount of clothing "drawn up at one end with string", Titus left Corlies' property and walked toward Williamsburg, Virginia. Corlies placed advertisements in Pennsylvania newspapers, promising a reward of "three pounds of proclamation money" for capturing Titus.

== American Revolutionary War ==
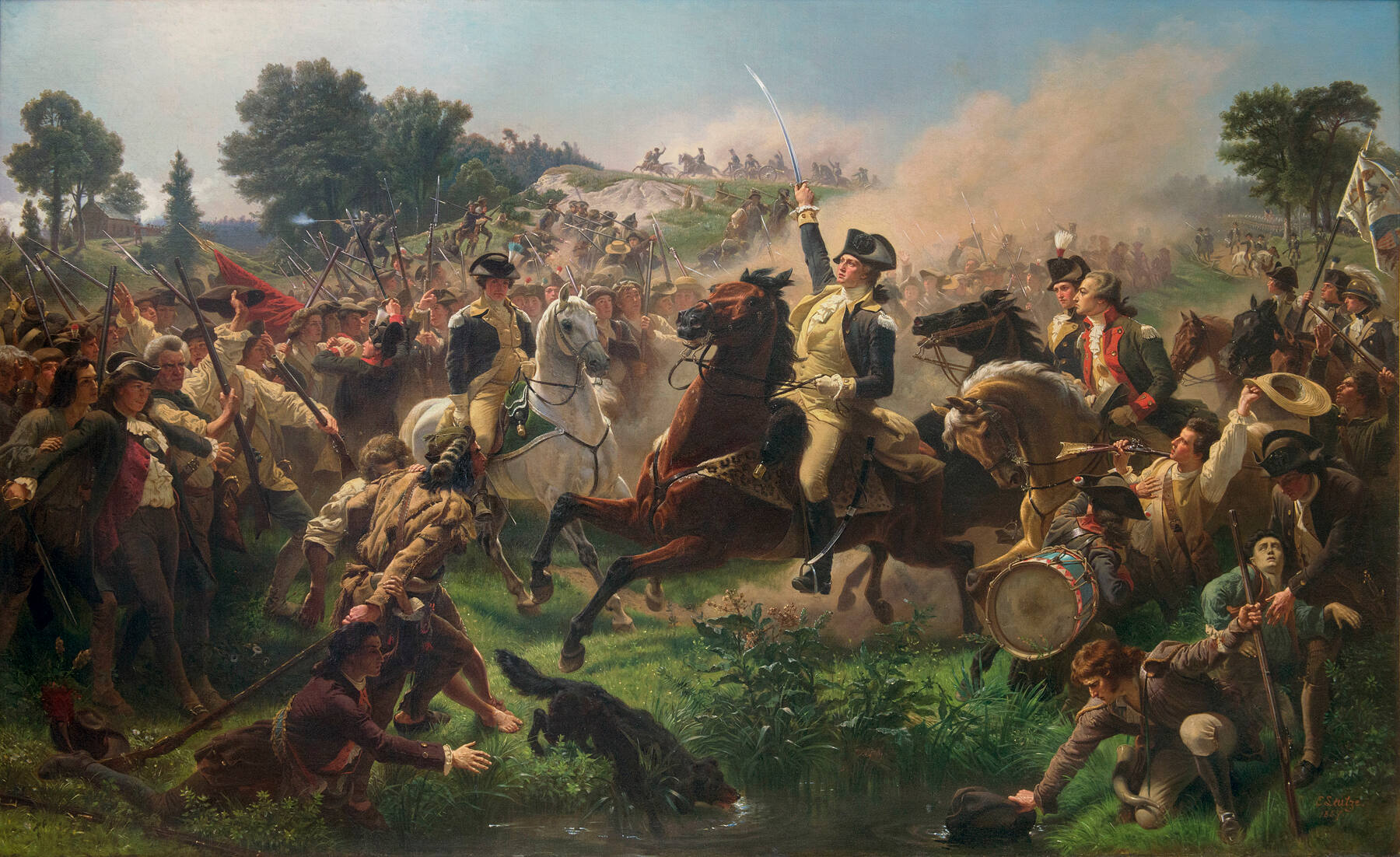
Battle of Monmouth

=== Ethiopian Regiment service ===
Assuming the adopted name of "Tye", Titus enlisted in the Ethiopian Regiment. Here is when he would also join and become the leader of the "Black Brigade". This group was a "mixed race" militia and consisted of both whites and blacks. The "Black Brigade" had a home base in a camp known as "Refugeetown" in Sandy Hook on the Atlantic coastline. In his first experience seeing action at the Battle of Monmouth in June 1778, Tye captured Captain Elisha Shepard of the Monmouth militia and brought him to his imprisonment at the Sugar House in British-occupied New York City. Fought near Freehold, New Jersey, the Battle of Monmouth proved to be indecisive militarily, but it introduced British and American forces to Tye's great ability as a soldier.

=== Leadership of Black Brigade ===
Colonel Tye's knowledge of the topography of Monmouth County and his bold leadership soon made him a well-known and feared Loyalist guerrilla commander. The British paid him and his group, consisting of blacks and whites, to destabilize the region. Orchestrated by Royal Governor William Franklin, the Loyalist son of Benjamin Franklin, this plan was an act of retaliation, in response to the American confiscation of Tory properties. When Monmouth Patriots began to hang captured Tories under the vigilante law that governed Monmouth County, Franklin and other British officials raided American towns. On 15 July 1779, accompanied by a Tory named John Moody and 50 African Americans, Tye executed a daring raid on Shrewsbury, New Jersey, during which they captured 80 cattle, 20 horses, and William Brindley and Elisha Cook, two well-known inhabitants. British officers paid Tye and his men five gold guineas for their successful raids. Tye and his fellow guerrilla fighters operated out of a forested base called Refugeetown in Sandy Hook. They often targeted wealthy, slaveholding Patriots during their assaults, which frequently took place at night. Tye led several successful raids during the summer of 1779, seizing food and fuel, taking prisoners, and freeing many slaves.

By the winter of 1779, Colonel Tye served with the "Black Brigade", a group of 24 black Loyalists. Tye's group worked in tandem with a white Loyalist unit, known as the "Queen's Rangers", to defend British-occupied New York City. Traveling undetected into the towns of Monmouth County, Tye and his men seized cattle, forage, and silverplate, and returned the resources to the weakened British forces. The Black Brigade also helped to usher escaping slaves to their freedom inside British lines, and later assisted their transportation to Nova Scotia for resettlement. They also raided patriot sympathizers in New Jersey, captured them, and brought them to the British in return for rewards. Due to their unjust treatment as slaves, the Black Brigade often aimed their raids at former masters and their friends. Because the members of the Black Brigade knew the homes of Patriots from their time as slaves, the Patriots feared the Black Brigade more than the regular British army.

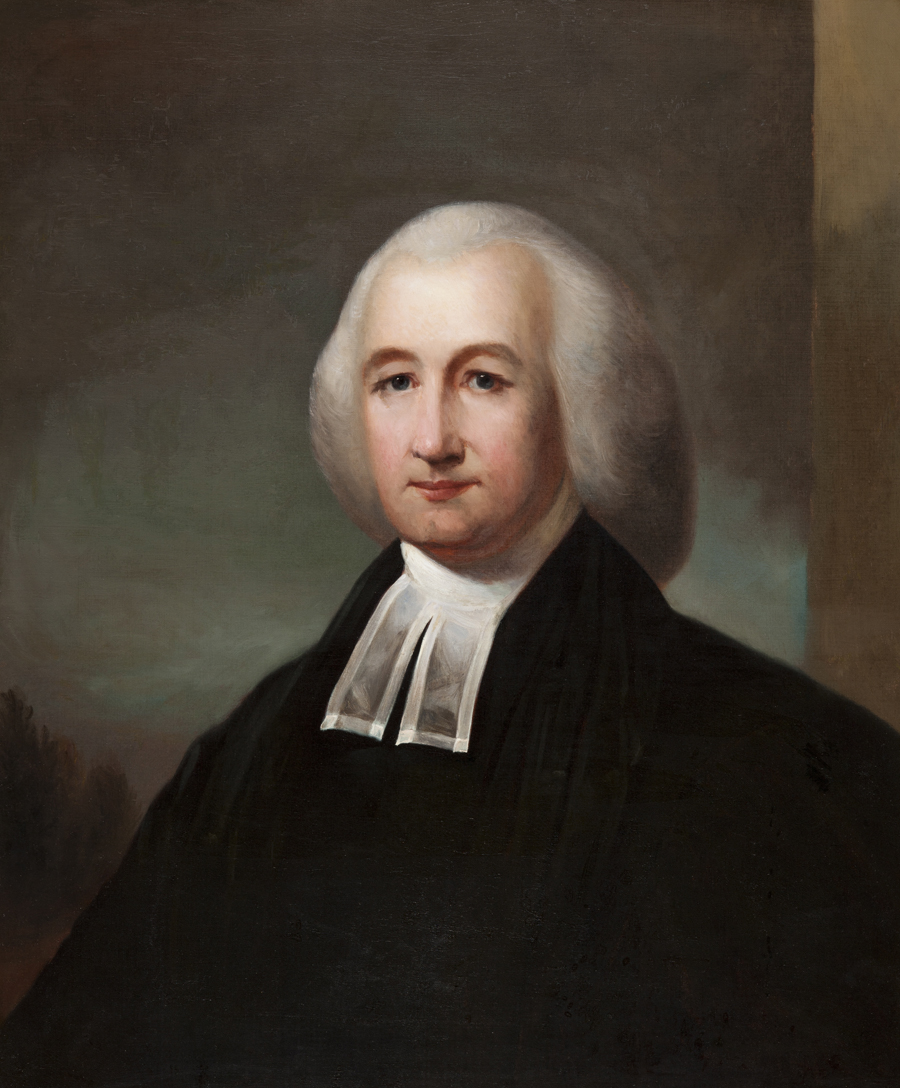
German Lutheran Pastor Henry Muhlenberg

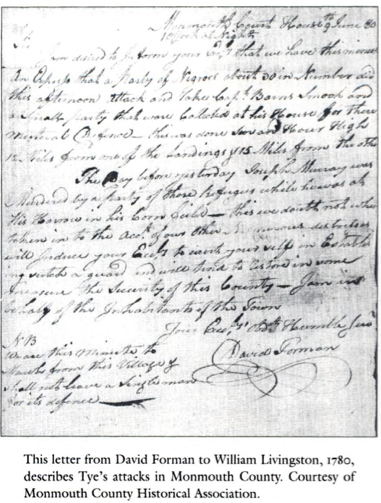
Letter from David Forman to Governor Livingston describing Tye's attacks

Henry Muhlenberg, a German Lutheran pastor sent to the colonies as a missionary, commented on how formidable the Black Brigade was: "The worst is to be feared from the irregular troops whom the so-called Tories have assembled from various nationalities– for example, a regiment of Catholics, a regiment of Negroes, who are fitted for and inclined towards barbarities, are lack in human feeling and are familiar with every corner of the country." Reports that African Americans planned massacres of whites in Elizabeth and in Somerset County inflamed the local population's fear of Tye and his men. Led by David Forman, the brigadier general of the New Jersey militia, the Monmouth County Whigs organized the Association for Retaliation to protect themselves against Tye and other Loyalist raids. Panicked white Patriots pleaded with Governor William Livingston to send assistance. For example, David Forman wrote to Livingston detailing the extent of Tye's attacks. Livingston responded by invoking martial law. This was a catalyst that convinced more African Americans to flee to British-held New York. For example, 29 male and female African Americans left slave owners in Bergen County during this time. In response, Livingston and his officials encouraged slaveholders to remove their slaves to more remote parts of New Jersey.

On 30 March 1780, the Black Brigade captured Captain James Green and Ensign John Morris. In the same raid, Tye and his men looted and burned the home of John Russell, an American known for his raids on Staten Island. Shortly thereafter, Tye and his men killed Russell and wounded his young son.

Beginning in June 1780, Tye led more attacks in Monmouth County. His forces attacked and killed Joseph Murray in his home in retaliation for Murray's vigilante executions of loyalists. He also raided Barnes Smock, a leader of Patriot militia in Monmouth County. Tye captured 12 of Smock's supporters and destroyed his artillery. In one noteworthy raid on 22 June 1780, Tye and his men captured James Mott, the second major in the Monmouth's militia regiment; James Johnson, a captain in the Hunterdon militia, and 6 other militia men. On 1 September 1780, Tye led a small group of African Americans and Queen's Rangers to Colt's Neck, New Jersey, with the aim of raiding the home of Captain Joshua Huddy. Known for his swift execution of captured Loyalists, Huddy was an important target for Tye and his band. Tye briefly captured Huddy, but in a surprise attack, a party of Patriots helped Huddy escape. Huddy and a female servant had managed to resist Tye's band for two hours before the Loyalists set fire to the house. The Patriots injured Tye in the fight, firing a musket ball through his wrist.

== Death ==
Colonel Tye developed tetanus and gangrene from the wound suffered in the raid against Huddy. Tye died two days later from the infection.

== Colonel Blucke, the new leader of Black Brigade ==
Colonel Stephen Blucke, who commanded the Black Loyalist unit, the Black Company of Pioneers, led Tye's troops following his death. Blucke successfully led the group for the rest of the war, even operating after the British surrender at Yorktown. On 24 March 1782, a group of avenging Tories captured the rebel Huddy and interned him aboard a British prison ship. On 12 April 1782, the Tories hanged Huddy on a beach at the foot of the Navesink Highlands. Soon after the death of Colonel Tye, the "Black Brigade" disbanded and most sought refuge in Canada.

== Legacy ==
Often considered one of the most effective and respected African American soldiers of the Revolution, Tye made significant contributions to the British cause. Although never commissioned an officer by the British Army, Colonel Tye earned his honorary title as a sign of respect for his tactical and leadership skills. The British often gave such titles to noteworthy black fighters in Jamaica and other parts of the British West Indies. Tye's knowledge of the swamps, rivers, and inlets in Monmouth County was integral to the British efforts in New Jersey during the war. As the commander of the Black Brigade, he led raids against American Patriots, seized supplies, and assassinated Patriot leaders during the war.

Tye had served a crucial role for the British forces in the area as he led numerous successful raids and battles against the local patriots. It can also be noted that he did a great deed in the slaves that he freed along with a few that he enlisted to fight alongside himself. The legacy of Colonel Tye can be seen through a quote of historian Robert Mayers in his chapter about Tye and Huddy from his book The Patriot and the Pine Tree. Mayers concluded, "Tye's reputation lived on among his comrades, as well as among his enemies. Many Americans contended that the war at the New Jersey shore would have been won much sooner had Tye been enlisted on their side. Others observed that had he lived on for the rest of the war, it would have been a disaster for the Patriots of Monmouth County. Ironically, Tye and other African-American Loyalists fought against the Patriots not because of their loyalty to the Crown but for many of the same freedoms the Patriots had demanded from the King."

Colonel Tye served as an example of the role of African Americans during the Revolutionary War. Dunmore's Proclamation involved the African American population in the war in a manner not yet seen. The promise of freedom inspired African American men like Tye to join the Loyalist cause. Tye and his men captured important Patriot militiamen, launched numerous raids, and seized scarce resources from the local population. Their actions gained the attention of Governor William Livingston, who invoked martial law in New Jersey as a result in an attempt to restore order. The actions of Tye and other former slaves provoked whites' fear that wartime abolition would cause further dislocation and disorder in the region. Further, Tye's exploits intensified white anxieties about slave revolt and served to reinforce anti-abolition sentiment.

== Representation in popular culture ==
- Colonel Tye and other Black Loyalists are among the subjects of PBS' Slavery and the Making of America.
- Colonial Williamsburg actor-interpreters portray the Royal Ethiopian Regiment of Virginia in their reenactments.

== See also ==
- List of slaves
- African Americans in the Revolutionary War
- New Jersey in the American Revolution
- Black Loyalist
