= Benjamin Etter =

Canadian silversmith and military officer (1763–1827)

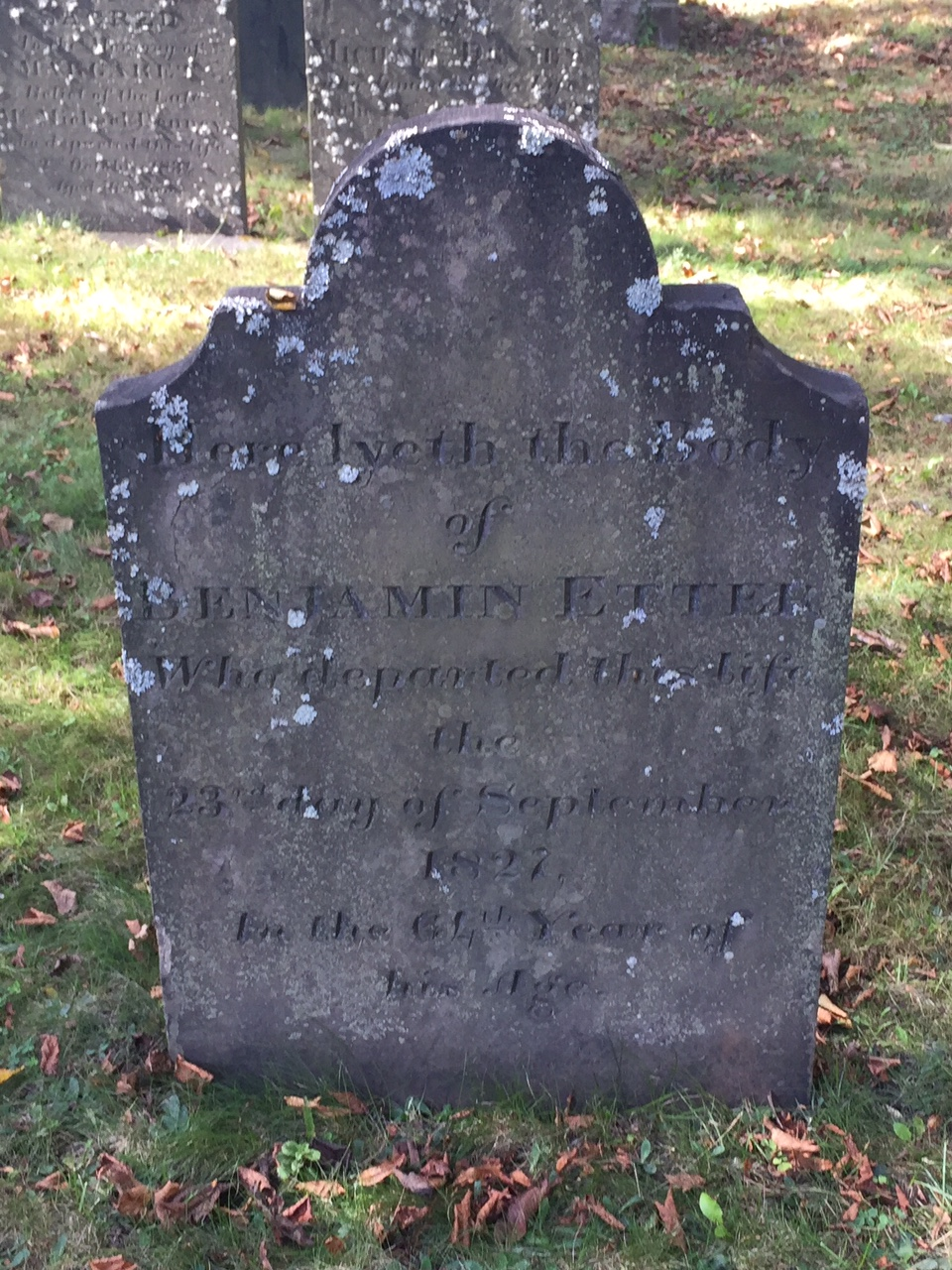
Benjamin Etter, Old Burying Ground (Halifax, Nova Scotia)

Benjamin Etter (1763 – 1827) was an American-born Canadian silversmith and military officer, in Halifax, Nova Scotia. Born in Braintree, Massachusetts, to Peter Etter, Etter arrived in Halifax from Boston at the outbreak of the American Revolution. He was an officer in the Nova Scotia militia (1796–1808), and served as an honorary aide-de-camp to Prince Edward. He purchased with James Woodill the privateer Earl of Dublin and the General Bowyer.
