= Slavery and the Making of America =

2004 documentary series

Slavery and the Making of America is a 2004 PBS four-part documentary series on African American slaves and their contributions to the United States. Famous African Americans, such as Colonel Tye, and historical figures, such as George Washington and John Murray, are documented in the series. The series also covers Black Loyalists and Black Patriots.

== Music ==
Emmy Award winning composer Michael Whalen wrote the film's original soundtrack.

== Slaveryinamerica ==
Slaveryinamerica was a website archive associated with the documentary series. It was jointly funded by PBS and New York Life. Slavery was being practiced throughout America in the 17th and 18th century, and the slaves built the foundation of the new nation.

== See also ==
- List of films featuring slavery
