= Jans Martense Schenck house =

Historic house in New York City

Coordinates: 40°36′56″N 73°54′43.6″W

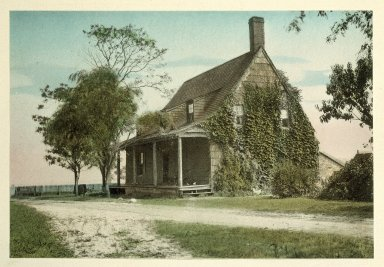
Jans Martense Schenck house

The Jan Martense Schenck house was built by a Dutch settler named Jan Martense Schenck (1631-1687), within what is now the Mill Basin section of Brooklyn, New York City. Believed to be one of New York City's oldest houses, the structure was later moved to the Brooklyn Museum, where it is used as a public exhibit.

Schenck was born in Amersfoort in the Dutch Republic. In 1675, Schenck bought a parcel of land on Molen Eylandt (Mill Island) in the Dutch town of Nieuw Amersfoort (now Flatlands), and his family owned the house for over a century. The area around the old house started to become heavily developed in the 1920s. In 1952, the Brooklyn Museum made a commitment to save the house, dismantled it, and stored it for about ten years until plans to install it in the Brooklyn Museum were finalized. The house was opened to the public in 1964.

== House ==
The Jan Martense Schenck house is believed to be one of the oldest houses in New York City. According to Schenck family tradition, its namesake arrived in New Netherland in 1650. He is first documented in Flatlands in 1660. On December 29, 1675, he purchased the land on which he built the house, along with a half interest in a nearby grist mill. The gristmill was purchased from Elbert Elbertse Stoothoff who had arrived in Nieuw Amsterdam in 1637 aboard the Vrede (Peace). The land was half of a tract Stoothoff purchased from Englishmen John Tilton Jr. and Samuel Spicer, who in turn had bought the land from the Canarsee Native Americans in 1664. Schenck built a pier so he could load and unload cargo to or from the Netherlands. A tide mill had been built on the land by the time Schenck bought the land, but the exact date of the mill's construction is not known; sources give dates between 1660 and 1675.

The Schenck family owned the house for three generations, finally selling it in 1784. Beginning in the 1920s, as real-estate development increased, a number of preservation plans that might have maintained the house on site were put forward but were never realized. Finally in 1952, the Brooklyn Museum made a commitment to save the house, dismantled it, and stored it for about ten years until plans to install it in the Brooklyn Museum were finalized. The house was opened to the public in 1964.

The house originally stood in the town of Flatlands, one of six rural towns that were to become the borough of Brooklyn. Established under the Dutch colony of New Netherland, which became the English colony of New York in 1664, Flatlands was first called New Amersfoort, after Amersfoort in the Netherlands. The area was originally inhabited by the Carnarsie Indians.

The house is a simple two-room structure with a central chimney. Its framework is composed of a dozen heavy so-called H-bents, visible on the interior of the house, that resemble goal posts with diagonal braces. This is an ancient northern European method of construction that contrasts with the boxlike house frames that evolved in England. The house had a high-pitched roof that created a large loft for storage. The roof was covered with shingles, and the exterior walls were clad with horizontal wood clapboard siding. A section of the clapboard has been removed at one corner to expose a reconstruction of the brick nogging used as insulation. The interior walls were stuccoed between the upright supports of the H-bents.

A kitchen was added at a right angle to the house probably in the late 1790s. In the early nineteenth century a porch with four columns was also added. Finally, sometime about 1900, dormer windows were installed above the porch. The interior of the house was also changed. The large central chimney was removed, probably about the same time as the kitchen wing was added, and new chimneys and fireplaces were built on the outer walls. Old photographs of the interior of the house on site in Flatlands show it with early twentieth century wallpapers and an assortment of nineteenth-century furniture, all of which was discarded when the house went to the Brooklyn Museum.

== Museum ==
During the 275 years that the house stood in its original location, it underwent many changes to accommodate the needs and tastes of new generations. The Brooklyn Museum’s curators might have chosen to exhibit and interpret the house to any point in its long history, but they wanted to add an early Dutch colonial house to the series of existing period rooms. This necessitated stripping away later additions and changes, such as the kitchen wing and porch, to rediscover the original two-room structure. The present reconstruction is based on careful analysis of surviving original elements and other surviving Dutch colonial houses. About 1730, when Martin Schenck, Jan’s eldest son, owned the house, it underwent several changes to accommodate his growing family. For a long period after about 1730, the two-room core of the house changed very little, and therefore the curators chose this moment in the early eighteenth century to which to interpret the house.

Many conjectural decisions were made, such as the precise locations of the exterior doors and the size and locations of the windows. On the interior, the location of the staircase to the loft and the form of the large open hearths and built-in bed box also involved conjecture, but were based on historical precedent. In the original Brooklyn Museum installation, there were two box-beds on the exterior wall of the north room. When the house was moved to its present location in 2006, it was decided that if the house did have a bed box it more logically was on an interior wall next to the hearth.

None of the original Dutch colonial furniture owned by the Schencks is known to have survived. The curators have assembled the interior-decorating scheme utilizing objects from the collection to typify an interior of a prosperous family of Dutch descent living in colonial English Flatlands. There are, therefore, both Dutch and English objects and furniture.

The curators use many clues to assemble an accurate interior. Wills and inventories of possessions of families of a similar economic level inform us about what might be found in a similar household. Period paintings help answer questions concerning the disposition of furniture about the room, possible color schemes, and the sort of textiles that might have been used. Through paintings, for example, visitors learn that mid-Eastern carpets were too valuable to place on the floor but rather were displayed on tabletops and then in turn covered with white linen cloths during meals.

For many years the house was painted gray. Recent analysis of the exterior paint layers on the original clapboard surviving in the corner at the short end of the building revealed that the house was originally white and then red. Since the interior of the house is interpreted to the first decades of the eighteenth century, the Brooklyn Museum decided that the house might have received its second coat of paint, the red layer, by that time.

== Property history ==
In 1672, Schenck married Jannetjie Stephens van Voorheis with whom he had eight children; His house (ca. 1675) was constructed around this time.

Named in will of Jan Martense Schenck; dated 28 Jan 1688/9; (*);

- (*) Jannetje born about 1673; married 20 May 1692 Gerret Janse Dorlandt.
- (*) Marten born 1675; married 2 Dec 1703 Cornelia Van Wessel.
- (*) Willemtje born about 1677; married Pieter Wyckoff.
- Stephen born 2 Oct 1681; died young.
- Jan/Johannes bp 5 Nov 1682; died young.
- (*) Neeltje bp 23 Nov 1683; married 5 Oct 1712 John Wyckoff.
- (*) Stephen born 22 Jan 1686; died 6 Nov 1767; married 26 Sep 1713 Antje Wyckoff; daughter of Nicholas Wyckoff. Left will dated 7 June 1758; proved *25 Feb 1768.
- Aaltje/Aelken.
- Antje.

On April 20, 1688, Roelof bought one half interest in the mill and half of the land of Mollen Eyelandt from his brother Jan Martense.

Marten married Cornelia Wesselen, widow of Domine Lupardus on December 2, 1703. On December 13, 1705, their son John was born.

John, who married Femmetie Hegeman on November 15, 1728, inherited the property from his father. On April 15, 1784, his heirs sold it for £2300 to Joris Martense of Flatbush, who rented out the mill and house.

Joris Martense's daughter Susan, wife of Patrick Caton, inherited the house and mill. She left it to her daughter Margaret who married General Philip S. Crooke. The property became known as Crooke's Mill and Crooke's Island. The mill eventually fell into disuse. The house and a small parcel of land it sat on was eventually inherited by Franklin Crooke who sold to the Atlantic, Gulf and Pacific Company in 1909.

During the American Revolution, the house was occupied by British Major James Moncrief, an engineer with the 7th Regiment of Foot. On June 18, 1778 an American raiding party under Captain William Marriner formerly a private in the Continental Army, who became a privateer, along with Lieutenant John Schenck of the New Jersey Militia landed on the shore of New Utrecht with 28 militia-men from Middletown Point, N. J. in two whaleboats as part of the informal Whaleboat War. They marched to New Utrecht were William Marriner stopped by the Van Pelt Manor house to inform his friend Peter van Pelt of is intentions, they then marched to Flatlands and took Moncrief prisoner while he was at the house. Moncrief was taken across Raritan Bay and up the Raritan River to New Brunswick, New Jersey where Marriner had a tavern. Lieutenant Schenck was familiar with the location as he had visited often and was a close relative.

After the Brooklyn Museum's purchase of the house, its site became the location of elementary school P.S. 236. The house was still extant after the school was built; it was located behind the school.

From the (1939) WPA Guide to New York City:

Schenck-Crooke House, Avenue U between East Sixty-third and sixty-fourth Streets, is considered one of the oldest houses in New York City, the original section having been built in 1656. A white house with green shutters and red brick chimneys, it stands in a little hollow back of Public School 236, surrounded by old pine trees. Its Dutch origins are evident in the small twelve-paned windows and early round-end shingles. The slender-pillared front porch formed by an overhanging roof is an eighteenth-century addition.

== Image gallery ==
Early views

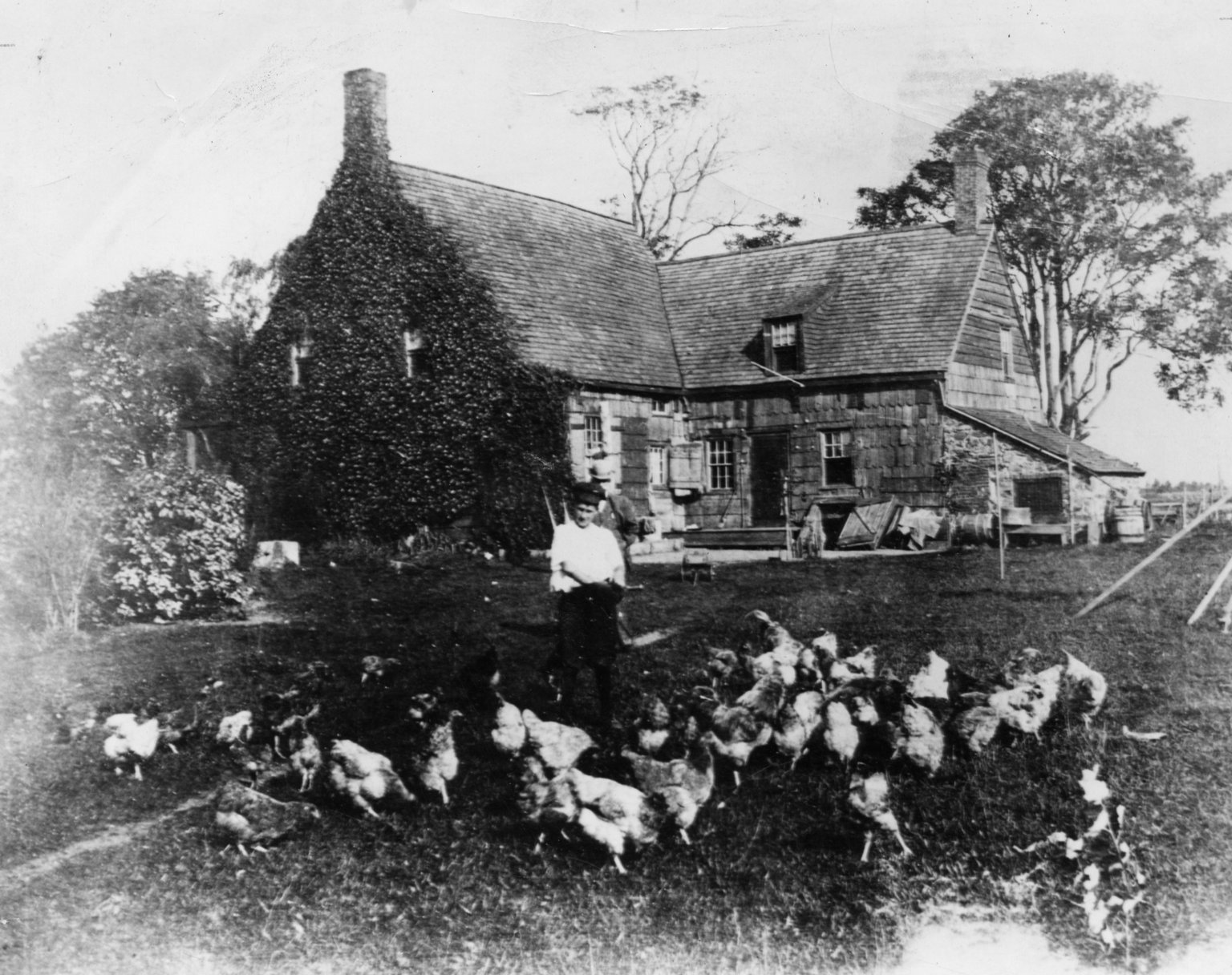
Exterior, Schenck House, 19th century. Brooklyn Museum

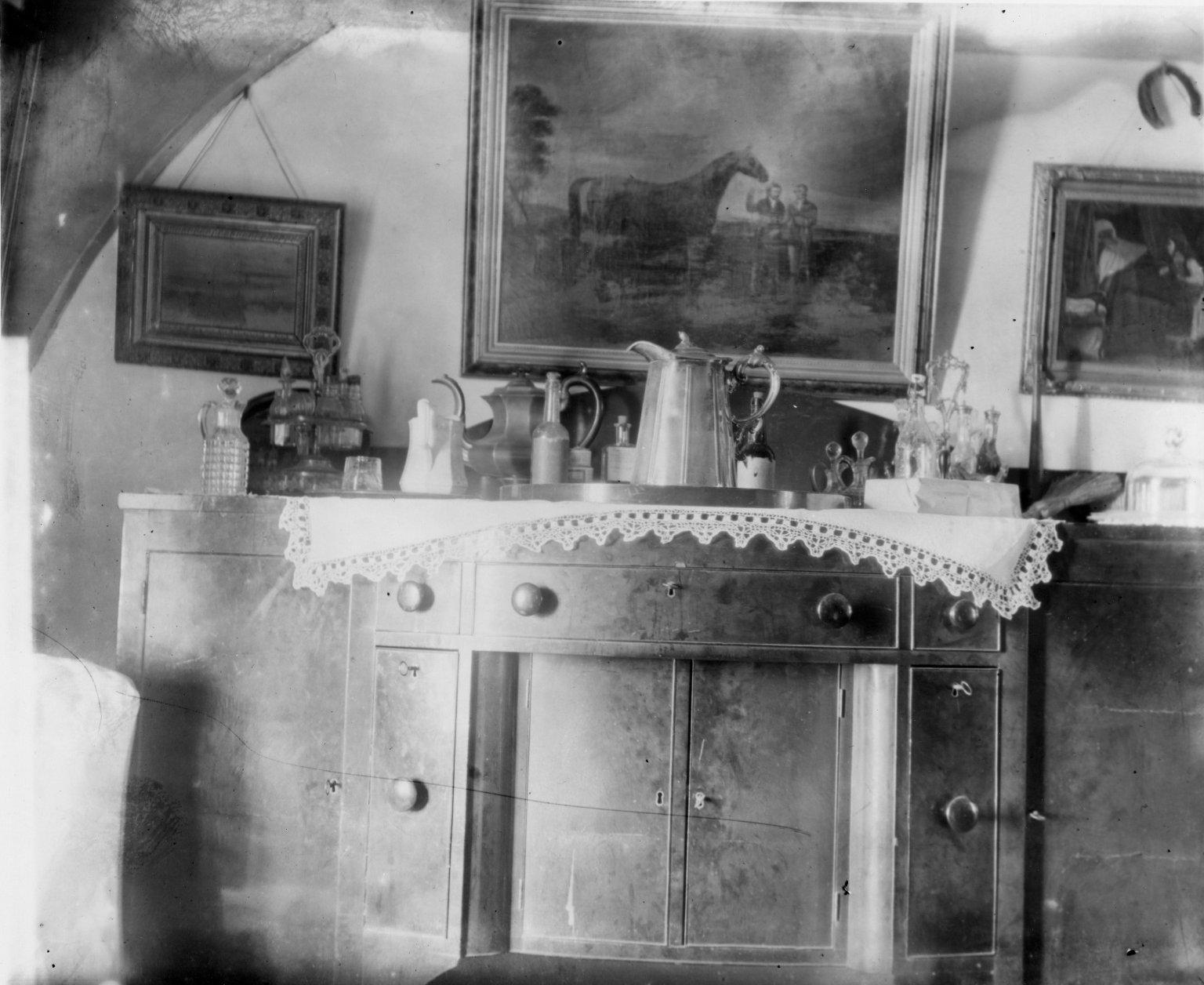
In situ interior, Schenck House, 19th century. Brooklyn Museum

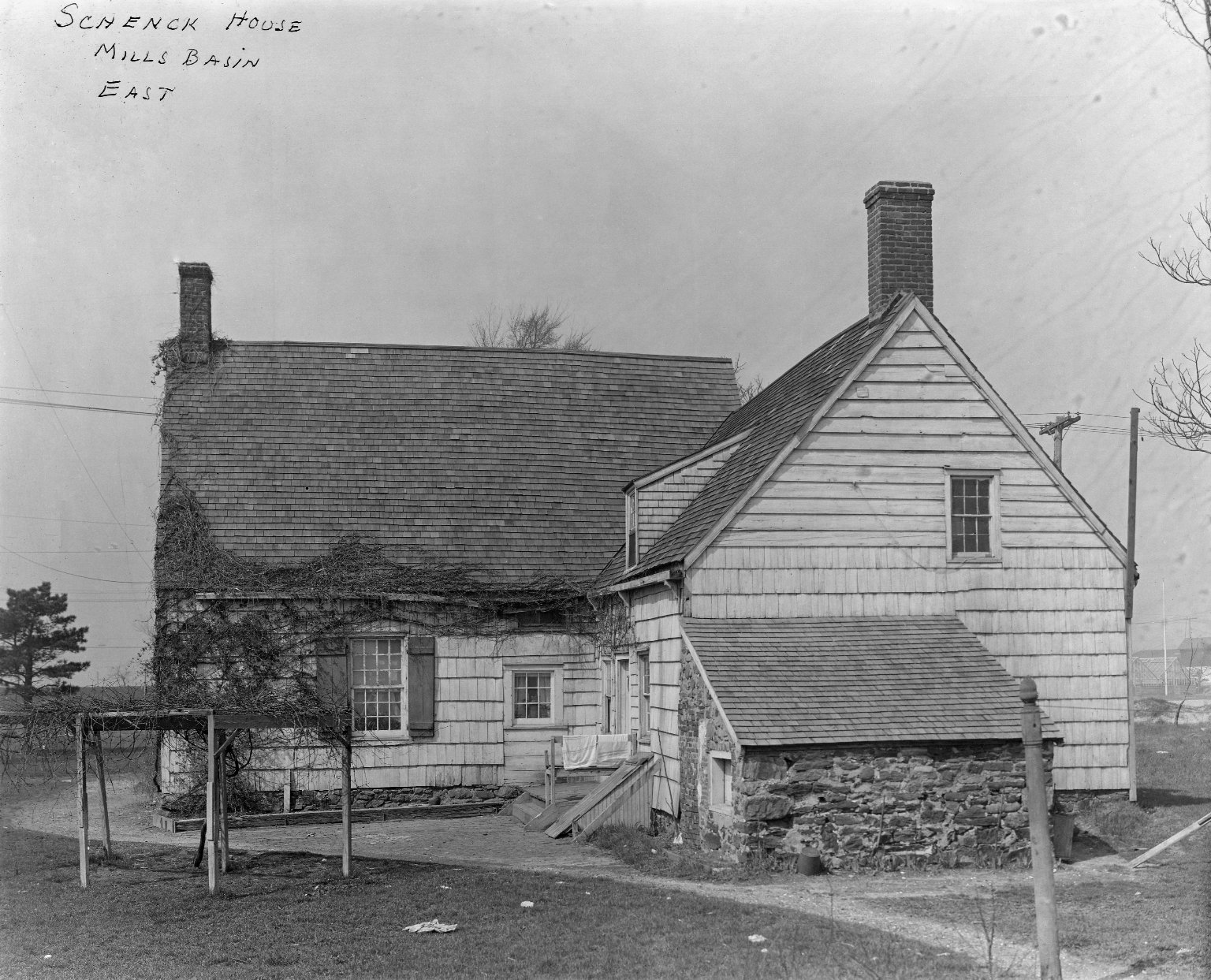
East view of Schenck House, 19th century. Brooklyn Museum

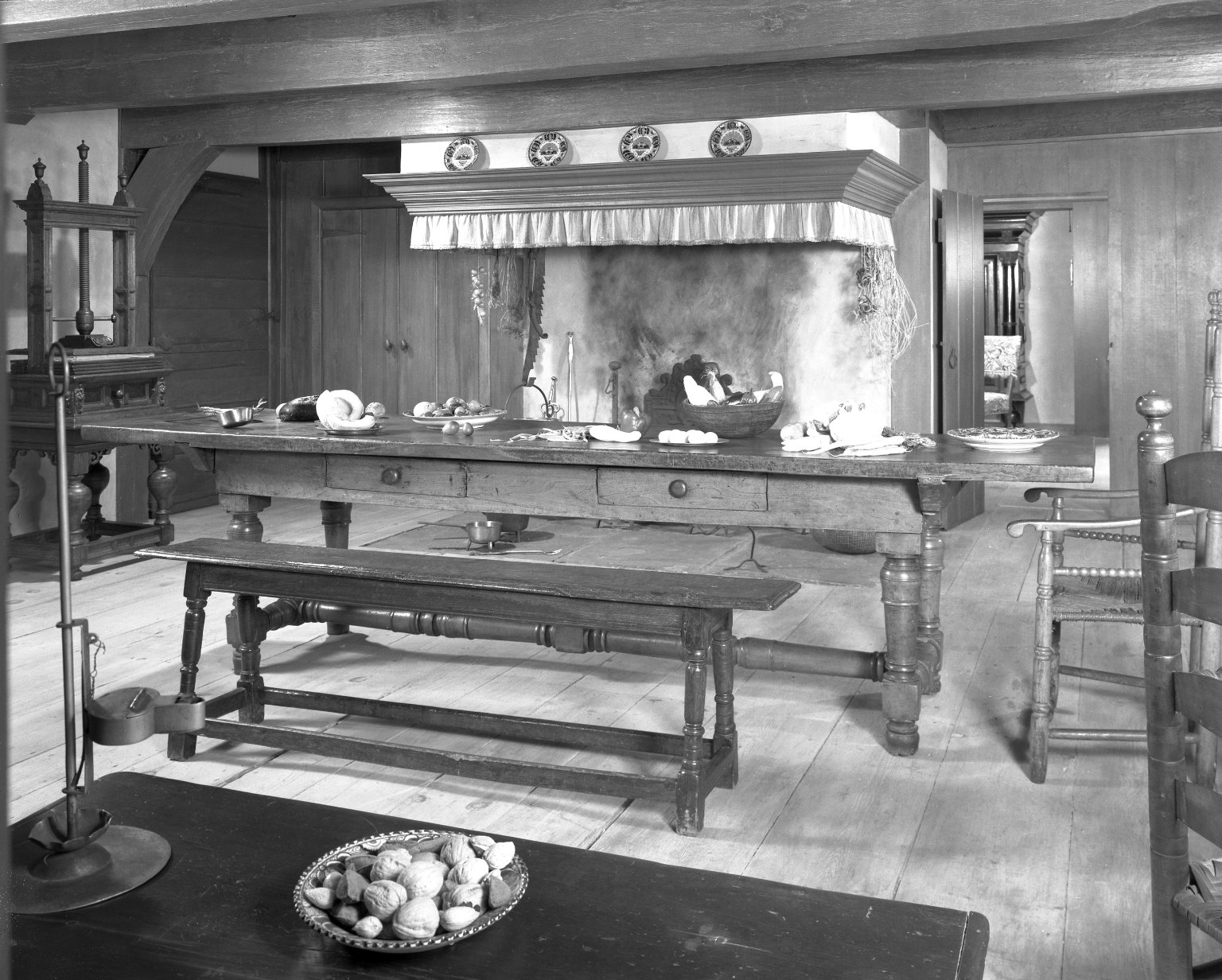
1987 installation of South Room, Brooklyn Museum

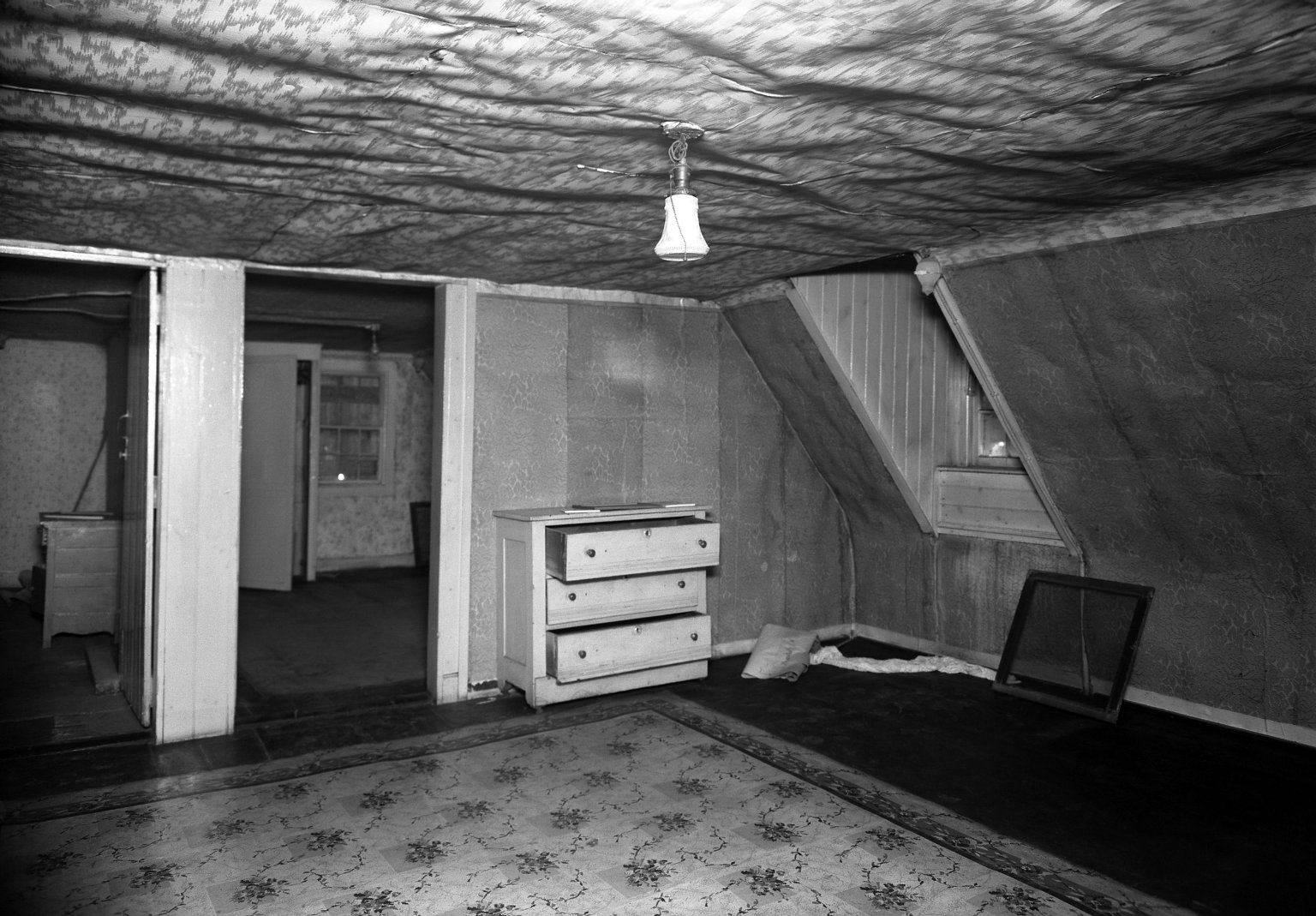
original interior space of Schenck House

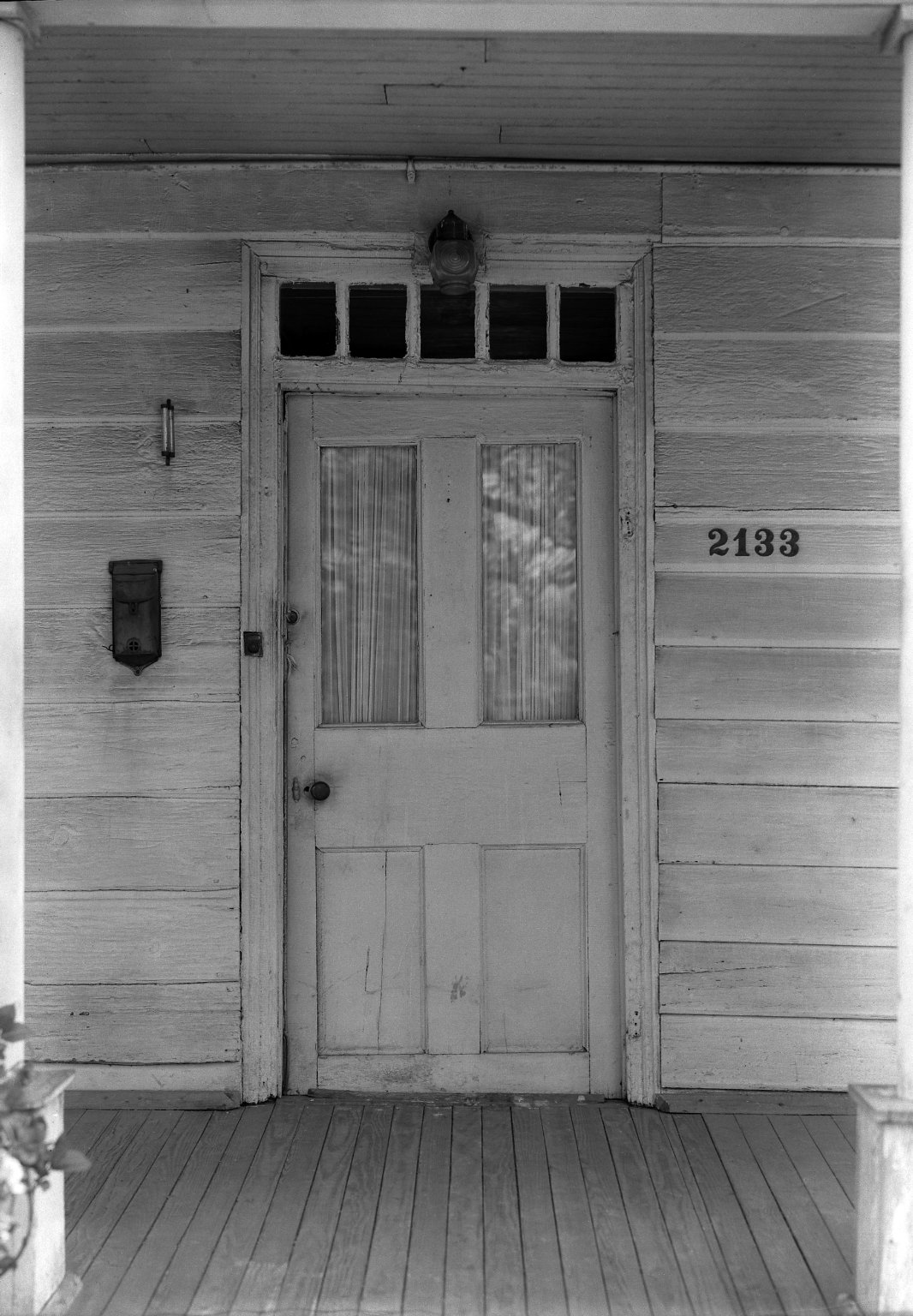
exterior front porch of Schenck House

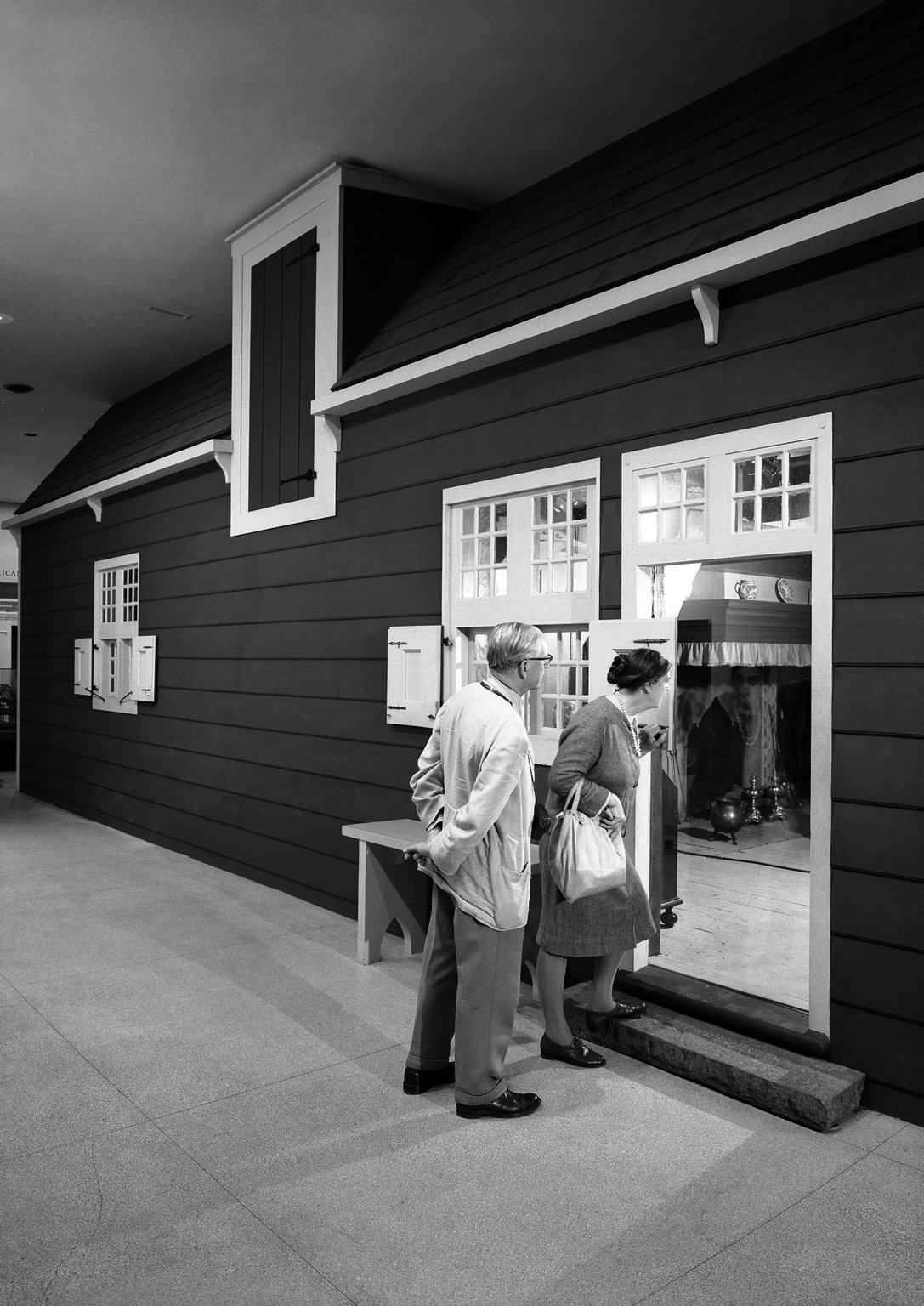
1964 Installation of Schenck House in the Brooklyn Museum

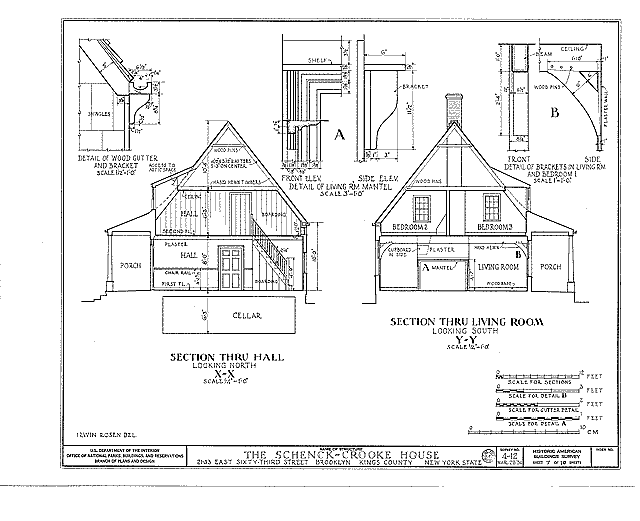
Jans Martense Schenck house plans

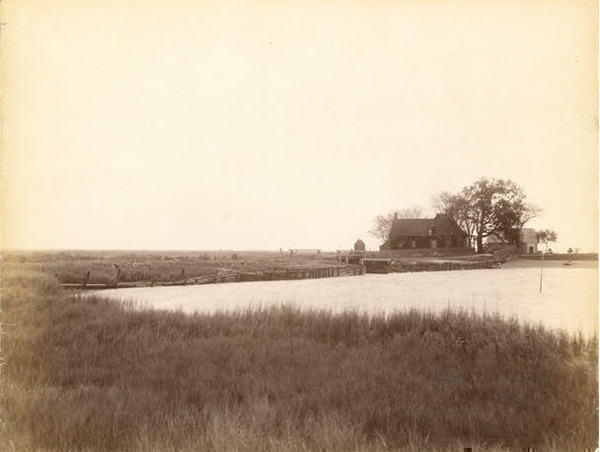
1891. Photograph by the Reverend William Edward Schenck
Current installation

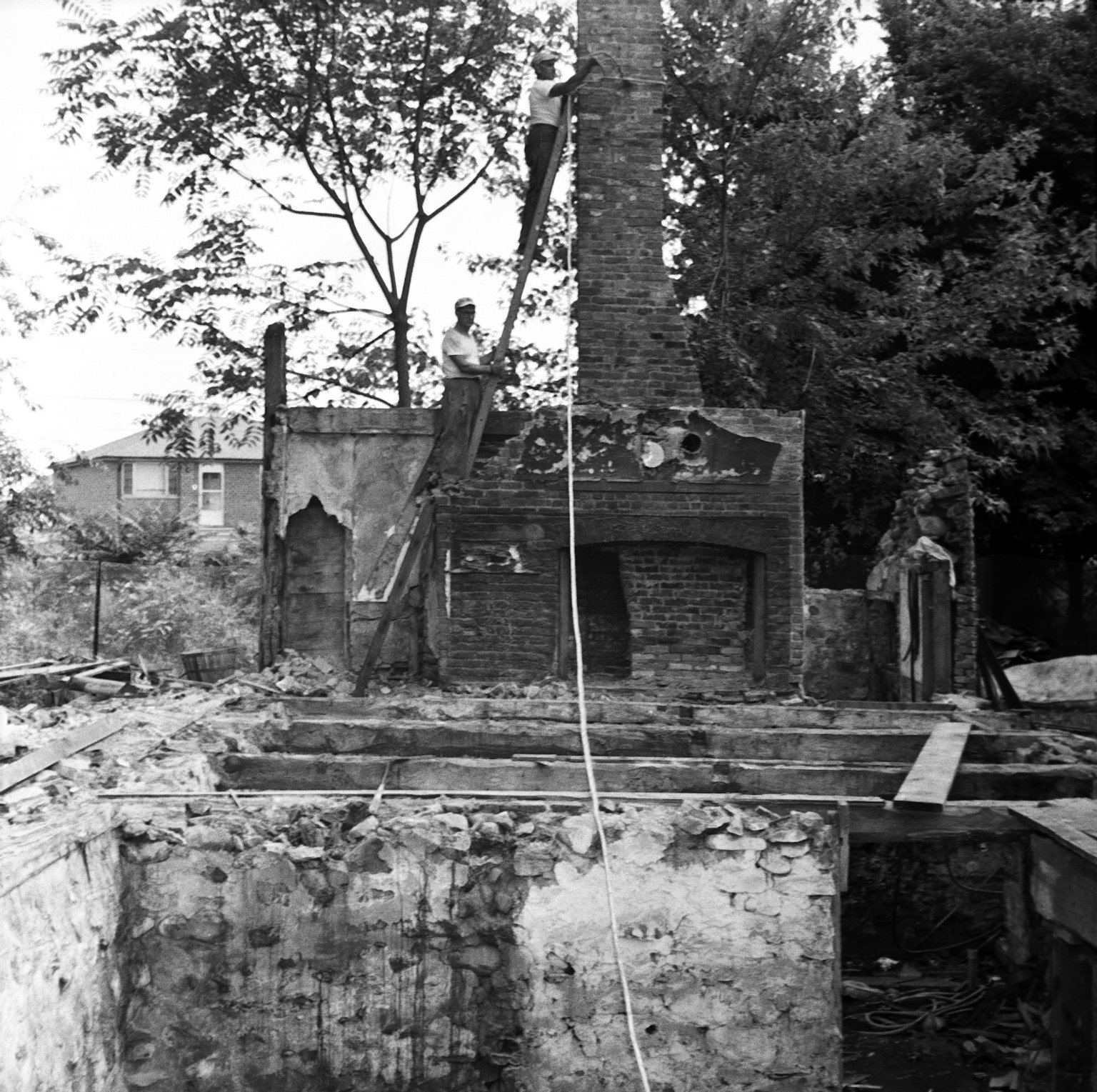
Schenck House disassembly

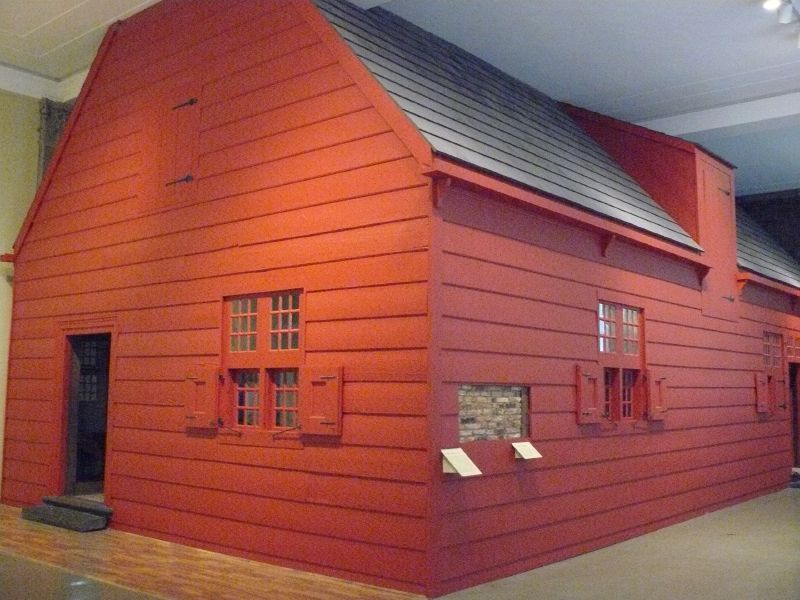

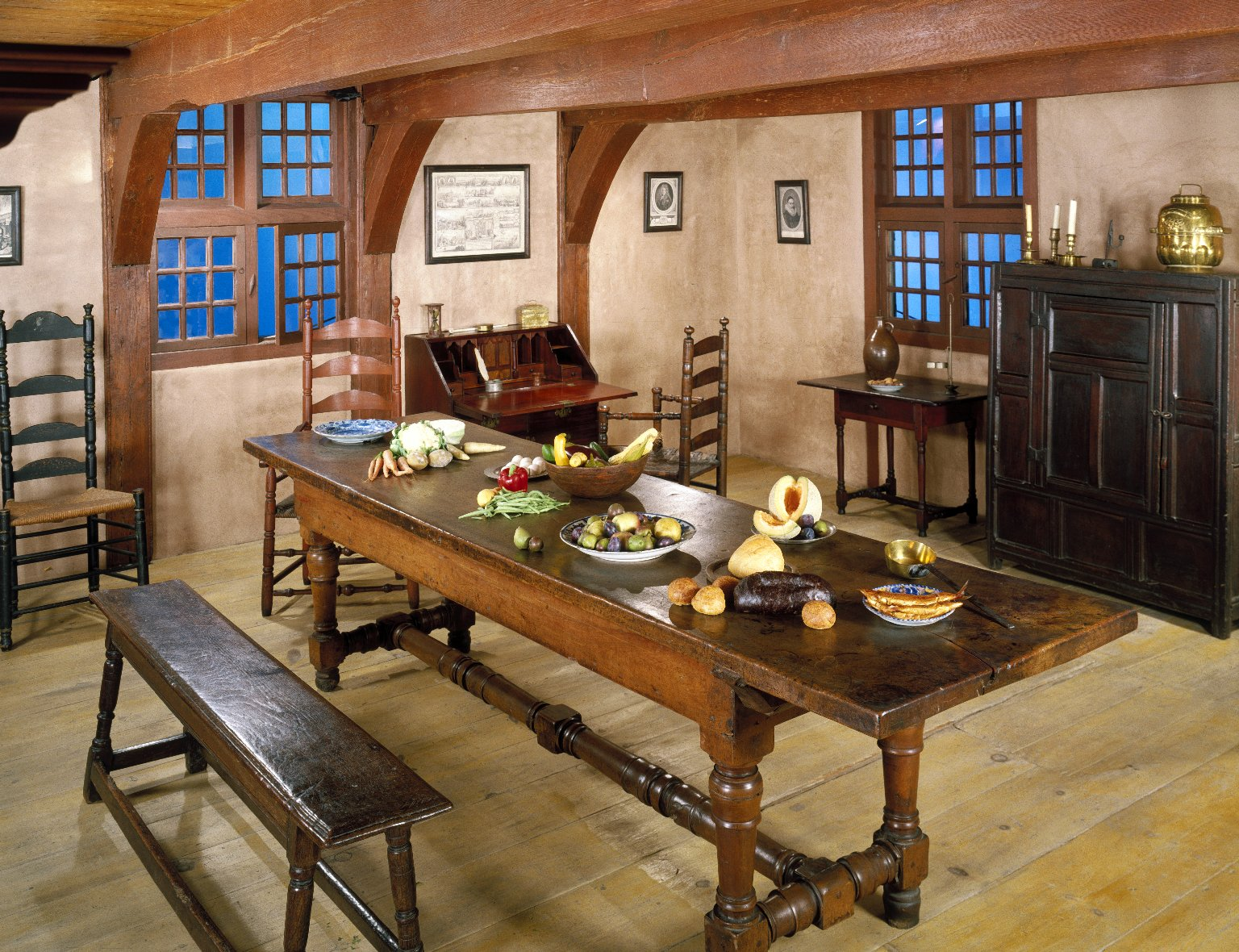
House installation in Brooklyn Museum 1985

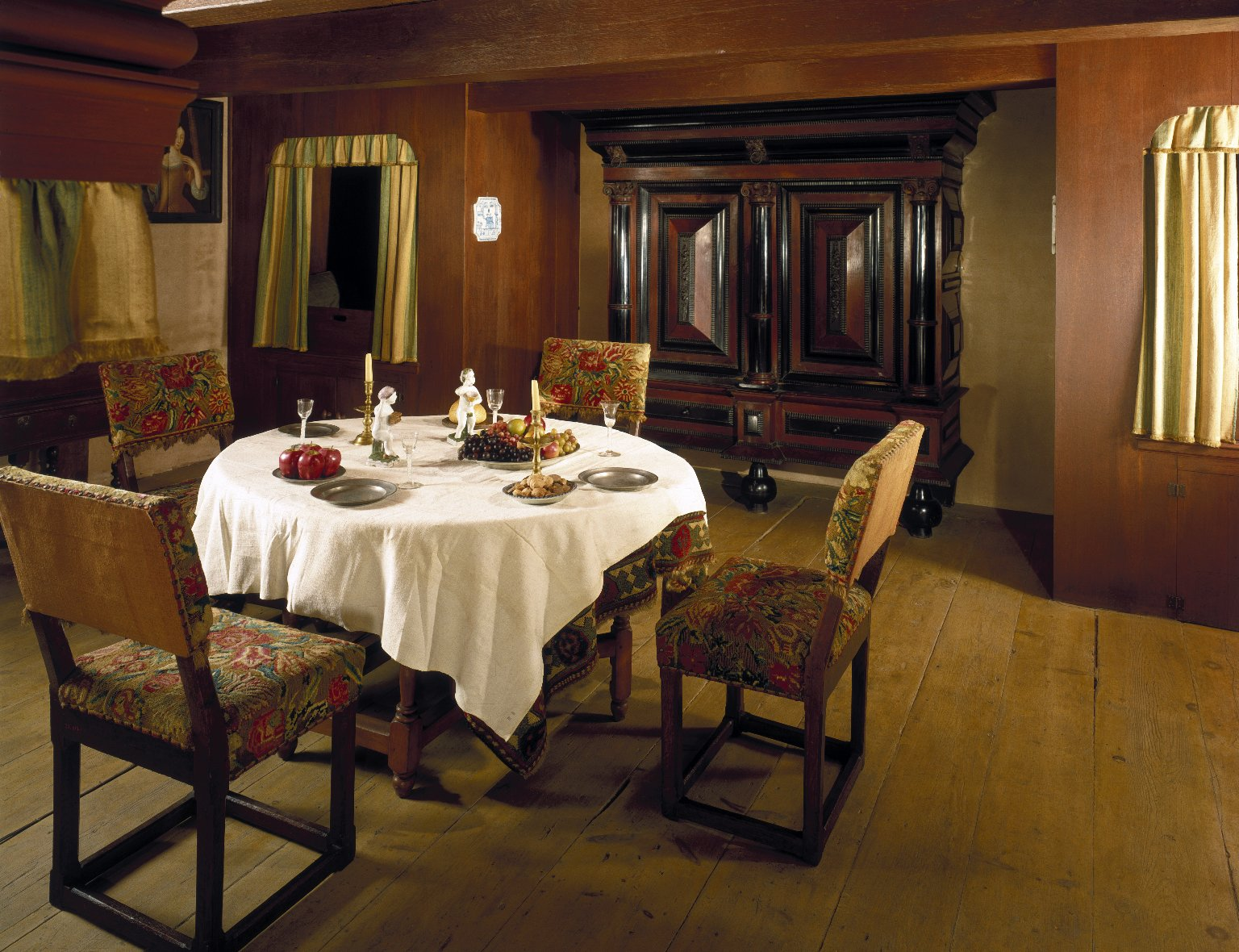
House installation in Brooklyn Museum 1985

== See also ==
- Vander Ende-Onderdonk House Site
- Hendrick I. Lott House
- Abraham Manee House
- List of the oldest buildings in New York
