= Royal Ethiopian Regiment =

- Active: 1775–1776
- Country: British America
- Allegiance: Great Britain
- Branch: infantry, dragoons (mounted infantry), labor duty
- Type: British provincial unit
- Role: guerrilla warfare, maneuver warfare
- Size: company (300)
- Nicknames: Lord Dunmore's Ethiopian Regiment, Dunmore's Ethiopian Regiment, Royal Ethiopian Regiment
- Motto: Liberty to Slaves
- Engagements: American Revolutionary War: Battle of Kemp's Landing (1775); Battle of Great Bridge (1775); Raids in Virginia Colony (1775–1776)

Commanders
- Ceremonial chief: King George III
- Notable commanders: Governor Lord Dunmore; Captain Samuel Leslie; Captain Charles Fordyce

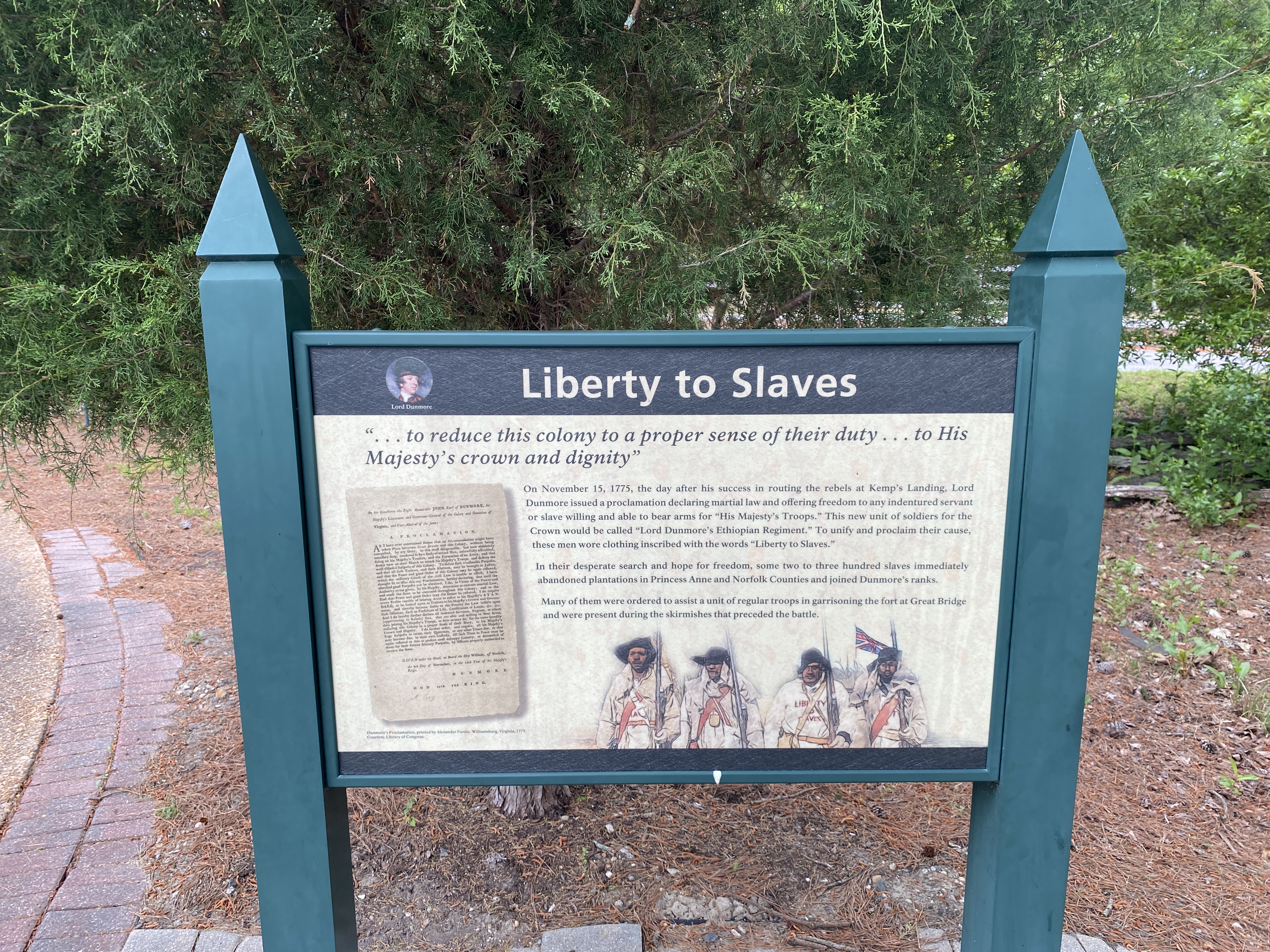
Plaque for Lord Dunmore’s Ethiopian Regiment

The Royal Ethiopian Regiment, also known as Lord Dunmore's Ethiopian Regiment, was a British military unit formed of "indentured servants, negros or others" organized after the April 1775 outbreak of the American Revolution by the Earl of Dunmore, last Royal Governor of Virginia. Dunmore issued a proclamation in November 1775, promising freedom to enslaved Blacks held by Patriots in Virginia, who joined the British cause to suppress the insurrection. Hundreds of enslaved men left their enslavers to join the new regiment led by British officers and sergeants. The regiment's uniforms were inscribed with the "incendiary words 'Liberty to Slaves'". Enlisted men were not only emancipated but also paid one pound, one guinea for joining. The regiment was disbanded in 1776, though many of its soldiers probably went on to serve in other Black Loyalist units.

== Unit formed ==
In 1775, Lord Dunmore, Royal Governor of Virginia, issued a proclamation offering freedom to all slaves of revolutionaries who were willing to join him under arms against the rebels in the American Revolutionary War. Five hundred Virginia slaves immediately abandoned their Revolutionary masters and joined Dunmore's ranks. The governor formed them into the Royal Ethiopian Regiment, also known as Lord Dunmore's Ethiopian Regiment.

During the war, tens of thousands of slaves escaped, having a substantial economic effect on the American South. An estimated 25,000 slaves escaped in South Carolina; 30,000 in Virginia, and almost one-quarter of the slave population in Georgia. Slaves also escaped in New England and New York, often joining the British forces occupying New York for freedom. While thousands went to the British lines for freedom (and the British evacuated nearly 4,000 Black Loyalists to Nova Scotia and other colonies after the war), others took advantage of the wartime confusion to migrate to other areas of the colonies.

"Smallpox also ruined the British plan to raise an army of slave and indentured servants by promising them freedom after the war - the disease killed off most of the Ethiopian Regiment even as it assembled."

Lord Dunmore's Royal Ethiopian Regiment, composed of escaped slaves, was probably the first black regiment in the service of the Crown during the revolution. By December 1775, the regiment had nearly 300 black people, including its most famous member, an escaped slave called Titus, then known as Tye. In later years, he became known as Colonel Tye, an honorary title for his military skills. Private Tye and his comrades believed that they were fighting not just for their own individual freedom but for the freedom of enslaved black people in North America.

== Campaigns ==
The Ethiopian Regiment saw service from 1775 to 1776. The Ethiopians perhaps saw action for the first time at the Battle of Kemp's Landing in November 1775. The Earl of Dunmore defeated the rebellious colonial militia. Two of its colonels were captured. One colonel was taken by one of his former slaves. The black regiment in British service was a symbol of hope for Americans of African descent. That black people were trained to bear arms and kill was a revolutionary idea at the time, especially as they were with one of the world's best armies.

In 1775 the Queen's Own Loyal Virginia Regiment, the Ethiopian Regiment, and the 14th Regiment of Foot occupied Norfolk, Virginia, and Dunmore established his headquarters there. Virginia's Committee of Safety ordered Colonel William Woodford in command of 500 Virginia rebels to Norfolk to oppose Dunmore. His men and others gathered at one end of a key bridge (at Great Bridge), on a causeway that connected the mainland to the port of Norfolk. Dunmore's forces, including some of the Ethiopians, had constructed Fort Murray at the other end of the bridge, and Colonel Woodford entrenched on his side of Great Bridge. Woodford sent a black man to Dunmore as a double agent with false news of Woodford's strength (he was to report they had only 300 men.) The spy further said the force were "green" recruits who would be easily frightened off.

Captain Samuel Leslie ordered Captain Charles Fordyce to lead 120 men of the 14th Foot down the causeway to attack the rebel position. The Ethiopian Regiment stood ready on Great Bridge supported by British cannon. Rebel sentries, notably William Flora, slowed the British advance with "buck and ball". Alerted by the noise of battle, the rebels manned the breastwork. The Revolutionaries did not fire, and waited until the British were close. Emboldened by the lack of an all-out assault, the British rushed forward. "The day is ours!" declared Captain Fordyce.

Silence was followed by gunfire. The Americans cut down Fordyce and 12 privates. Of the wounded, two were former slaves who belonged to the Ethiopian Regiment: James Sanderson was wounded in the forearm; and Cesar was wounded in the thigh. Woodford marched some of his men through the swamps and attacked the Ethiopian Regiment's flank, forcing them back in confusion. The revolutionaries seized two British cannon, and the British retreated back into their fort. In the following days, the British evacuated the fort and then Norfolk, which was then occupied by revolutionary forces including Woodford and his men.

== Colonel Tye ==
Titus was a slave who had run away from his master in Monmouth County, New Jersey before Lord Dunmore's proclamation of emancipation to slaves of rebels who would join his ranks. He heard of Lord Dunmore's proclamation and went to Virginia to enlist in Dunmore's Ethiopian Regiment.

== Unit disbanded ==
Dunmore's defeat was the first significant engagement of the American Revolutionary War in the South. Dunmore's Ethiopian Regiment was formed under white officers and non-commissioneds, although it is probable that some of the black recruits later became sergeants. Dunmore disbanded the Ethiopian Regiment in 1776 on Staten Island, although many of its members likely served as Black Pioneers during the occupation of New York

Nothing is known of Tye's activities until he returned to New Jersey. He took part in the Battle of Monmouth in June 1778, and for the next two year was the Black Loyalist guerrilla leader called "Colonel" Tye. He led the Black Brigade, which served with the Loyalist Queen's Rangers in defending British-held New York in the winter of 1779. Tye led numerous raids in Monmouth County, New Jersey, disrupting American supply lines, capturing rebel officers, and killing suspected Patriot leaders. He died in 1780 of tetanus from a bullet wound in his last raid.

== See also ==
- Black Loyalists
- Black Nova Scotians
- African Americans in the Revolutionary War
- List of British units in the American Revolutionary War
