= Peter Etter =

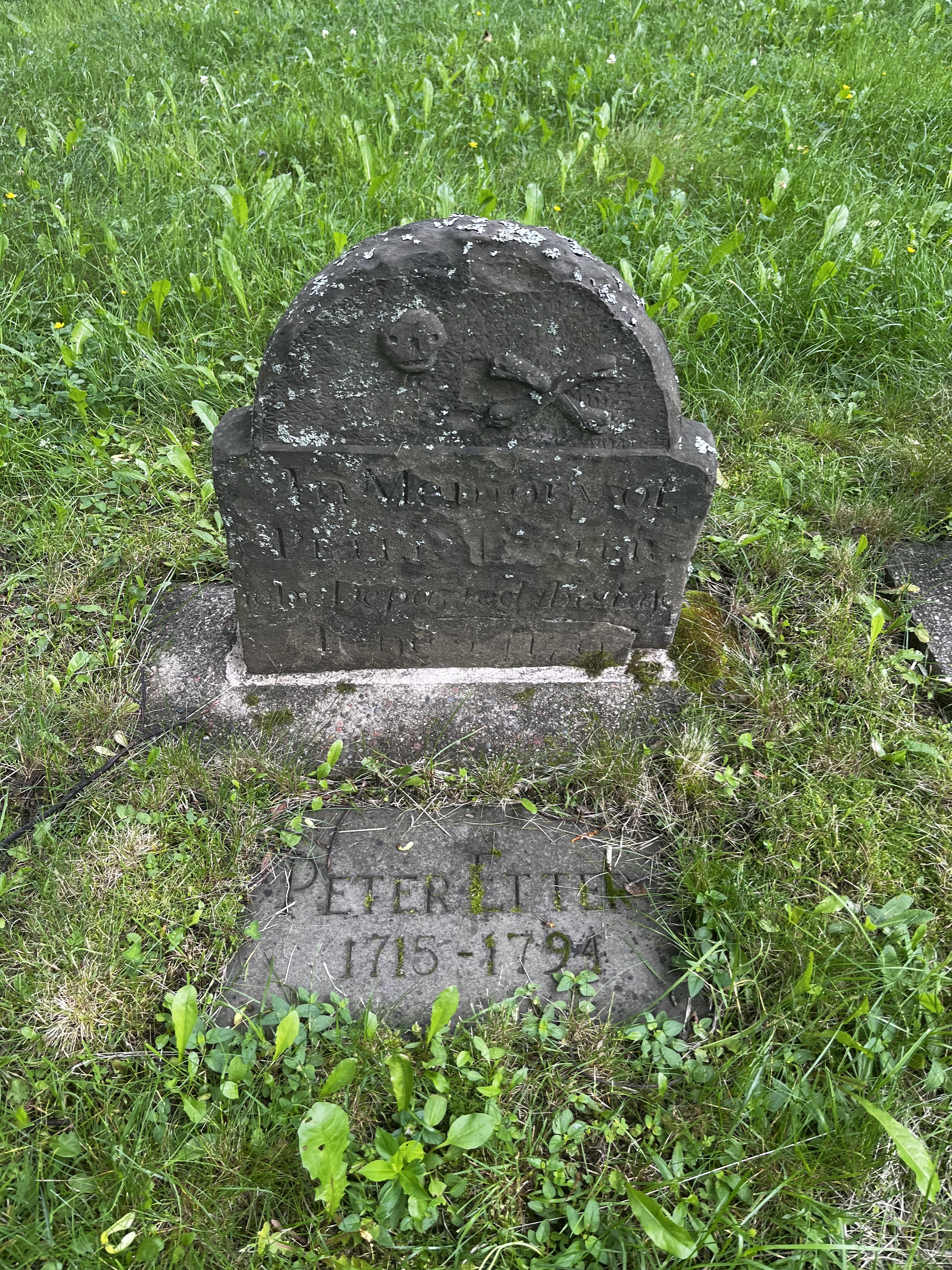
Peter Etter, Old Burying Ground (Halifax, Nova Scotia)

Peter Etter (1715–1794) was a loyalist who was a long-term friend of both Benjamin Franklin and future President John Adams. His friendship with Adams broke over Adams decision to support the American Patriots in the American Rebellion. Etter's son Peter Jr. fought with Joseph Gorham against the Eddy Rebellion; another son was Benjamin Etter who became a silversmith.

Etter was born in Bern, Switzerland and his father received a land grant in Philadelphia Pennsylvania in 1737. Peter became a well known business man in the city and the owner of a small factory of looms that created stockings for the military. He became a member of the Unitas Fratrum of Movavian Brethren.

He was recruited by Benjamin Franklin in 1747 to become an officer in the militia to defend Philadelphia during King George's War. His military unit was known as the Philadelphia Associators, who established two forts on the Delaware. Peter remained a friend of the Franklin family, naming his second son Franklin Etter (b. 1752).

Etter moved to Braintree, Massachusetts about 1750. He built his factory again and was a business associate of Benjamin Franklin’s brother, John. While in Braintree he became friends with John Adams, who mentions Etter numerous times in his diary. In 1766, Etter was instrumental in getting Adams elected as a select man of the town. In March 1772, Etter was elected as one of six wardens for the town of Braintree. By January 1775, however, the Etter family was forced to flee to Boston as loyalist refugees, abandoning his house and factory. By March the family was evacuated to Halifax, Nova Scotia. While in Halifax for the next 18 years, he was employed as a messenger of the Nova Scotia House of Assembly.

He died on 28 June 1794 and is buried in the Old Burying Ground (Halifax, Nova Scotia).

== See also ==
- Nova Scotia in the American Revolution
