= Black Company of Pioneers =

- Active: 1777–1783
- Country: British America
- Allegiance: Britain
- Branch: British provincial unit
- Type: Labour detail, (auxiliary troops)
- Role: Construction, street cleaning, garbage collection
- Size: Company (50–70)
- Nicknames: Black Pioneers, Clinton's Black Pioneers
- Motto: Liberty to Slaves
- Engagements: American Revolutionary War (no combat experience, except for former soldiers, coming from the disbanded Ethiopian Regiment)

Commanders
- Notable commanders: General Sir Henry Clinton Major James Moncrief; Captain Allen Stewart; Captain Donald McPherson; Colonel Stephen Blucke; Sergeant Thomas Peters Sergeant Harry Washington

The Black Company of Pioneers, also known as the Black Pioneers and Clinton's Black Pioneers, were a British Provincial military unit raised for Loyalist service during the American Revolutionary War. The Black Loyalist company was raised by General Sir Henry as a non-combatant replacement force for the disbanded Ethiopian Regiment in Philadelphia in late 1777 or early 1778. Pioneers were soldiers employed to perform engineering and construction tasks. In 1778, the Pioneers merged into the Guides and Pioneers, led by Colonel Beverley Robinson in New York. Its company commanders were Captain Allen Stewart and Captain Donald McPherson. In 1783, the company was disbanded in Port Roseway, Canada, now Shelburne, Nova Scotia.

== Company formed ==
The Black Pioneers were an African American military unit, established, in May 1776, out of Lord Dunmore's disbanded Loyalist unit, the Royal Ethiopian Regiment. The Pioneers retained the Ethiopian regimental motto, which was embroidered on their uniforms: "Liberty to Slaves."

== Duties of service ==
During the American Revolution, the Black Pioneers would "Assist in Cleaning the Streets & Removing all Nuisances being thrown into the Streets." The company followed the British troops, under the command of General Clinton, as they moved from New York to Philadelphia, to Charleston, and, after the fall of Charleston, back to New York once again.

== Commanders ==
The Black Pioneers were commanded, for a time, by Major James Moncrief of the Royal Engineers. Moncrief had great faith in the ability of African-American slaves to fight. In a letter to Clinton, at the close of the war, he offered to continue the war with a brigade of African-American troops. He also advocated for their freedom, in light of their service in the British Army. One of the most famous commanders of the Company of Black Pioneers was Colonel Stephen Blucke, who commanded them for a number of years. In 1780, Blucke would go on to command the small Loyalist military unit known as the Black Brigade, after their leader, Colonel Tye, died of lockjaw. Blucke received the honorary rank of "Colonel".

== Uniforms and weapons ==
The Pioneers wore black, wool, tricorn hats, trimmed with white bunting, black spatterdashes, and originally blue, wool, short coats later replaced with provincial green wool that retained the former Ethiopian Regimental motto, which embroidered on their uniforms: "Liberty to Slaves". The Black Company of Pioneers may have been trained to use the standard British Army-issue Brown Bess musket.

== Military recruitment, evacuation, and resettlement of escaped American Loyalist slaves ==
After Lord Dumore's proclamation of freedom to escaped slaves that helped the British Army, Harry Washington, a slave, ran away from General George Washington's Mount Vernon plantation to join the Black Pioneers in 1776. After the Pioneers arrived in New York in 1783, many former slaves escaped from the harbor, in fear of being repossessed by their former masters. It is still unknown how many former slaves escaped from New York during this period.

Tens of thousands of slaves, up to one hundred thousand, escaped during the war and joined the British military; others simply moved off during the chaos. In South Carolina, nearly 25,000 slaves, being 30% of the enslaved population, fled, migrated, or died from the disruption of the war. When the British withdrew their forces from Savannah and Charleston they also evacuated 10,000 slaves belonging to Loyalists.

The British evacuated nearly 20,000 blacks at the end of the war. More than 3,000 of them were freedmen and resettled in Nova Scotia, many under the leadership of Stephen Blucke, a prominent Black leader of the battalion.

== See also ==
- African Americans in the Revolutionary War
- Black Nova Scotians
- List of British units in the American Revolutionary War
