= James Moncrief =

James Moncrief (1743 in Scotland – 1793 in Ostend, Flanders) was a trained engineer and military officer of Scottish Highlander descent in the British Royal Engineers.

== Education ==
Moncrief graduated from the Royal Military Academy at Woolwich, England, in 1762 at the age of 21.

== Military service ==
Moncrief, after his graduation from the Royal Military Academy, would become a career military man who would rise to the rank of colonel. He saw extensive service in the American colonies in the late 18th century and upon Britain's takeover of Spanish Florida in 1763, he drafted a current map of St. Augustine the capital of East Florida, and its defenses while serving under military governor James Grant.

During the American Revolution Moncrief served in various campaigns throughout the colonies. In 1776 he served as guide to the 4th Regiment of Foot (now King's Own Royal Border Regiment) during a river crossing on the march to Philadelphia and participated in the Battle of Brandywine.

From the journal of Captain John Montresor, concerning action at Fort Mifflin:

Captain James Moncrief Engineer and 50 Hessians, recovered the gun unspiked and all the detachment except 2 subalterns, 5 grenadiers and 2 artillery men. During this day the Rebels fired 3,000 Cannon Shot at this battery from the instant day broke. The Troops being few and harassed no work this night. This morning cold and white frost.

Moncrief was briefly captured by an American raid on the Flatlands Jans Martense Schenck house as part of the Whaleboat War in 1778. He later became Chief Engineer responsible for the defenses during the Siege of Savannah by combined American and French forces in 1779 and took part in the Battle of Stono Ferry in South Carolina.

In 1780 he took part in the successful Siege of Charleston by the British Army which resulted in the capture of 5,000 troops of the Continental Army.

Moncrief took command of the Black Pioneers a black Loyalist force, and had strong faith in the African American's ability to fight. After Lord Cornwallis' surrender at Yorktown he wrote General Clinton in New York to remind him of the invaluable service to Britain performed by those under his command while building the defenses at Savannah and Charleston and offered to continue the war with a brigade of African American soldiers.

After the American Revolution Moncrief was placed in command of a company at Gosport from 1785 to 1787. He then served under the Duke of York and Albany in the Low Countries during the War of the First Coalition against Revolutionary France and took part in the Siege of Valenciennes in 1792. He was wounded during the unsuccessful Siege of Dunkirk on 6 September 1793 and died a few days later at Ostend.
