= Stephen Skinner (Canadian politician) =

Canadian politician (1725–1808)

Stephen Skinner (1725 – October 27, 1808) was a judge and political figure in New Jersey and Nova Scotia. He represented Shelburne County in the Nova Scotia House of Assembly from 1793 to 1799.

He was born in Perth Amboy, New Jersey, the son of the Reverend William Skinner. He was a judge in the Inferior Court of Common Pleas for Middlesex County, New Jersey from 1763 to 1774. Skinner was treasurer for New Jersey in 1763. He was named to the New Jersey Council in 1774. Skinner raised a loyalist company in New Jersey during the American Revolution. Skinner moved to Nova Scotia in 1783. He married Catherine Johnstone. He died in Shelburne.
