= Cornelius Hatfield Jr. =

Loyalist spy, guide, intelligence gatherer, and raider in the American Revolution

Cornelius Hatfield, Jr. (c. 1755 – 13 August 1823) was a Loyalist spy, guide, intelligence gatherer, and raider in the American Revolution. Hatfield was commissioned a captain and leader of an independent company of Refugee partisans in February 1779 by British Commander-in-Chief Sir Henry Clinton. A native of Elizabethtown, New Jersey, Hatfield and his partisans operated from British-held Staten Island until the end of the war. An expert in surprise night raids along the northern New Jersey coast, Hatfield claimed to have "captured nearly three hundred officers of rank and soldiers, the chief part of which were at different times exchanged for British of the same rank."
