= Battle of Kemp's Landing =

Skirmish in the American Revolutionary War

- Part of the American Revolutionary War
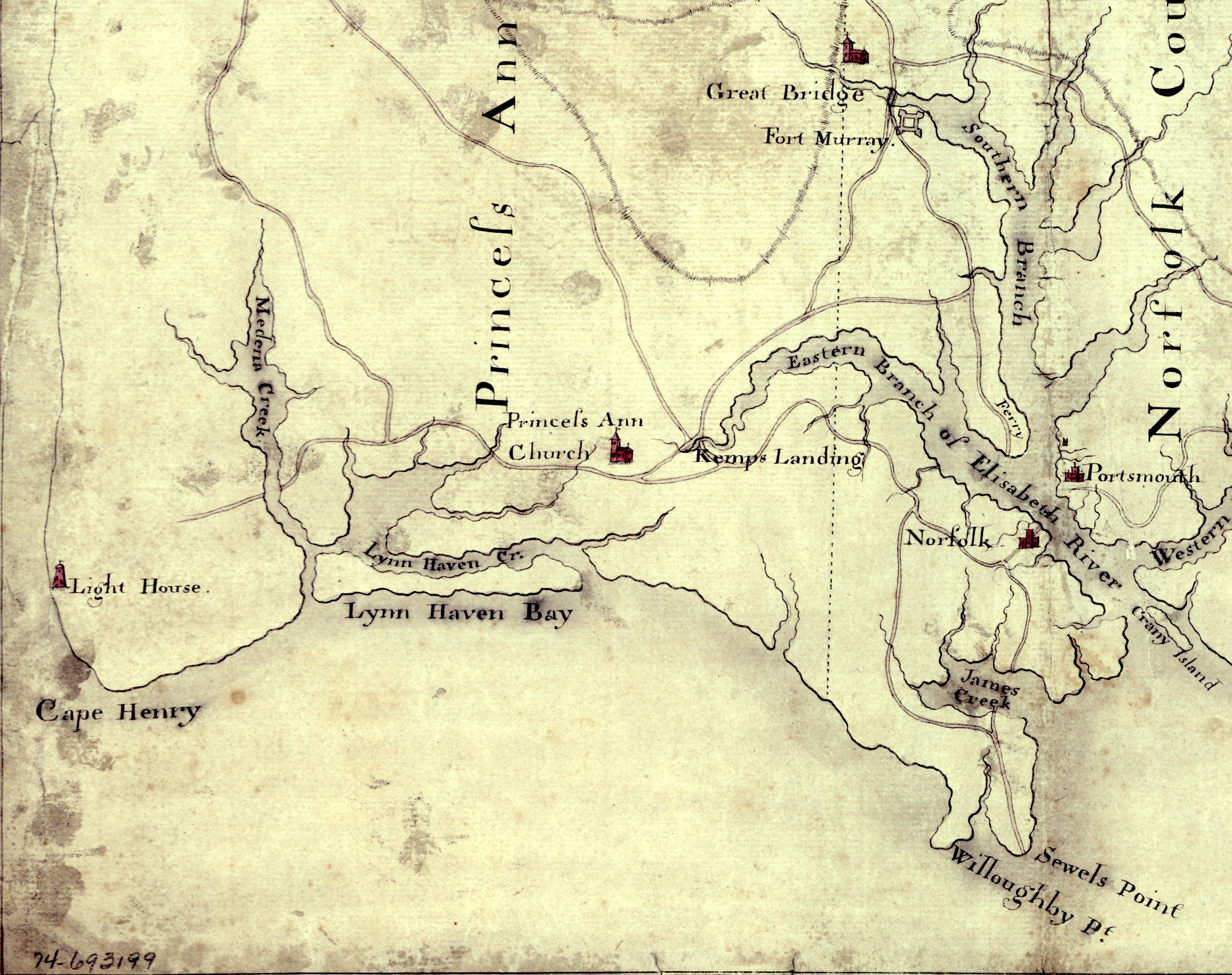
- Detail of a 1770s map of eastern Virginia. Oriented with North at the bottom of the map, Kemp's Landing is near the center of the map, and Norfolk is to its right (west).
Date	November 15, 1775
Location	Kemp's Landing, Virginia; now in Virginia Beach, Virginia 36°49′37″N 76°09′37″W
Result	British victory

Belligerents
Virginia Committee of Safety: Patriot militia	(Kingdom of Great Britain) Province of Virginia: British army; Loyalist militia / Lord Dunmore Ethiopian regiment (term use for African American troops)

Commanders and leaders
Joseph Hutchings (POW); Anthony Lawson	John Murray, 4th Earl of Dunmore

Strength
170 militia	100 infantry 20 militia

Casualties and losses
7 killed 18 captured	1 wounded

The Battle of Kemp's Landing, also known as the Skirmish of Kempsville, was a skirmish in the American Revolutionary War that occurred on November 15, 1775. Militia companies from Princess Anne County in the Province of Virginia assembled at Kemp's Landing to counter British troops under the command of Virginia's last colonial governor, John Murray, Lord Dunmore, that had landed at nearby Great Bridge. Dunmore was investigating rumors of Patriot troop arrivals from North Carolina that turned out to be false; he instead moved against the Princess Anne militia, defeating their attempt at an ambush and routing them.

Dunmore followed up the victory with a reading of his proclamation declaring martial law and promising freedom to slaves belonging to Patriot owners if they served in the British military. This increased opposition to his activities, and he was eventually forced to leave Virginia.

== Background ==
Tensions in the British Colony of Virginia were raised in April 1775 at roughly the same time that the hostilities of the American Revolutionary War broke out in the Province of Massachusetts Bay with the Battles of Lexington and Concord. Rebellious Whigs in control of the provincial assembly had begun recruiting troops by March 1775, leading to a struggle for control of the colony's military supplies. Under orders from John Murray, 4th Earl of Dunmore, the royal governor of Virginia, British troops removed gunpowder from the colonial storehouse in Williamsburg, alarming the Whigs that dominated the colonial legislature. Although the incident was resolved without violence, Dunmore, fearing for his personal safety, left Williamsburg in June 1775 and placed his family on board a Royal Navy ship. He then assembled a small British fleet at Norfolk, a port town whose merchants had significant Loyalist (Tory) tendencies. The threat posed by this fleet may have played a role in minimizing Whig activity in the town.

Incidents continued between Whigs on one side and Tories on the other until October, when Dunmore had acquired enough military support to begin operations, and the rebellious Whigs had accumulated a significant body of men at Williamsburg. General Thomas Gage, the British commander-in-chief for North America, had ordered small detachments of the 14th Regiment of Foot to Virginia in response to pleas by Dunmore for military help. These troops began raiding surrounding counties for rebel military supplies on October 12. This activity continued through the end of October, when a small British ship ran aground and was captured by Whigs during a skirmish near Hampton. Navy boats sent to punish the townspeople were repulsed by Continental Army troops and militia in a skirmish that resulted in the killing and capture of several sailors. Dunmore reacted to this event by writing a proclamation on November 7 in which he declared martial law, and offered to emancipate Whig-held slaves in Virginia willing to serve in the British Army. Although he did not immediately publicize the proclamation, Dunmore was able to recruit enough slaves to form the Ethiopian Regiment, as well as raising a company of Tories he called the Queen's Own Loyal Virginia Regiment. These local forces supplemented the two companies of the 14th Foot that were the sole British military presence in the colony.

== Prelude ==
Virginia's Committee of Safety began organizing troops at Williamsburg to send to Norfolk in response to Dunmore's actions. The forces raised, led by Continental Army Colonel William Woodford, did not leave Williamsburg until November 7 due to shortages of equipment and supplies. They were prevented from crossing the James River for a week by British ships sent by Dunmore to patrol the river. Dunmore, who was operating from a Royal Navy ship, landed "109 Rank and file, with 22 Voluntteers from Norfolk" near Great Bridge on November 14, to investigate rumors that Patriot militia had arrived in the area from North Carolina. His landing prompted the militia of Princess Anne County to be called out. About 170 men responded to the militia call issued by Joseph Hutchings, the local militia commander, and Anthony Lawson, a prominent local landowner. They mustered at Kemp's Landing, about 10 miles (16 km) from Great Bridge, and set up an ambush along the road to Great Bridge.

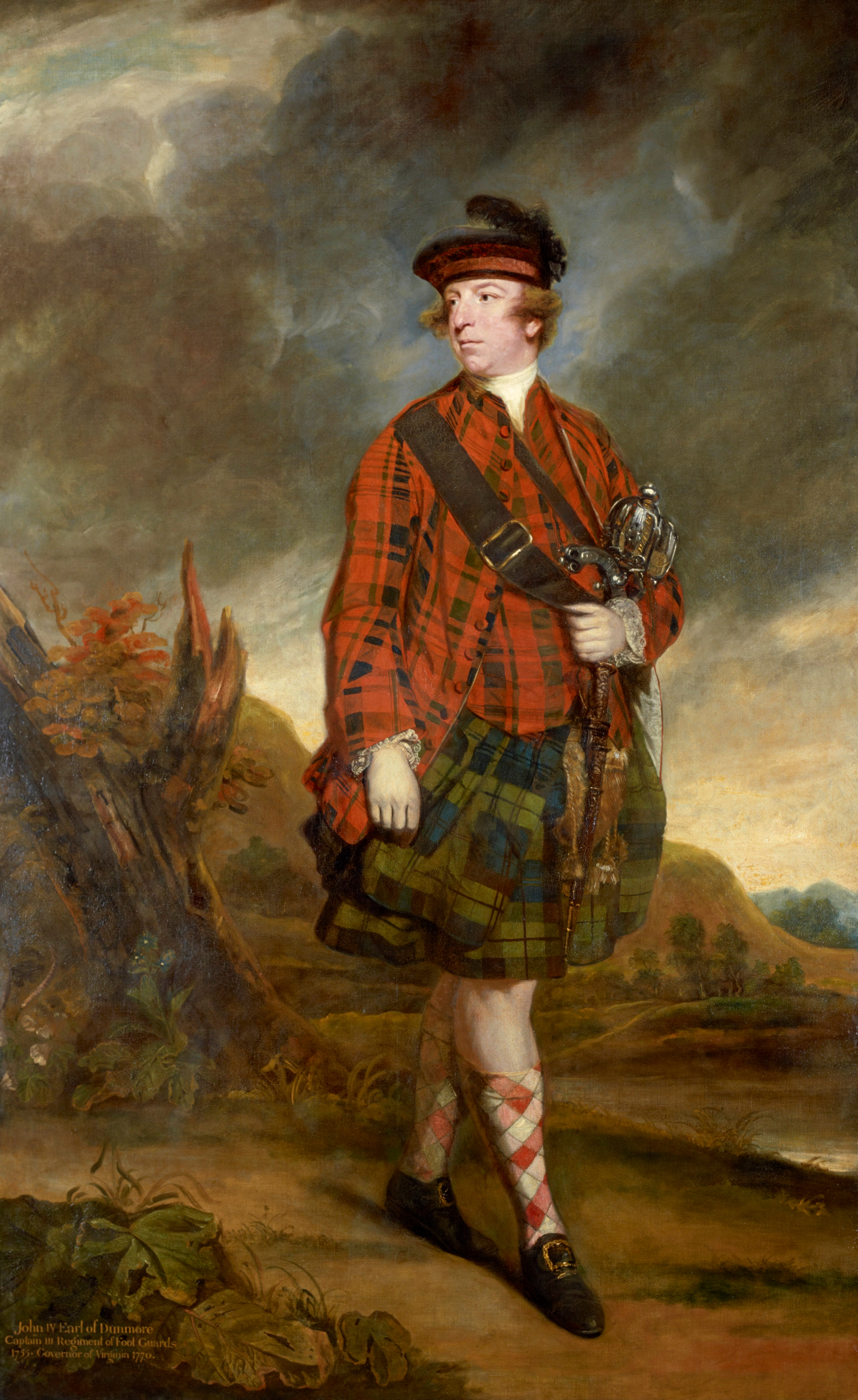
John Murray, 4th Earl of Dunmore

Dunmore's search of the Great Bridge area the next day confirmed that the rumors were false, but heard of the militia mustering at Kemp's Landing. Leaving a company of troops to defend the causeway to the bridge and begin construction of defenses, he took 100 regulars and 20 Loyalists toward Kemp's Landing.

== Skirmish ==
The Patriot ambush was spoiled when Hutchings' inexperienced militiamen opened fire too early. Dunmore's disciplined regulars returned fire, moving through the woods to flush out the rebels. The militia scattered, and in the ensuing chase, Hutchings was captured by one of his former slaves. Lawson was able to escape the battle, but was captured a few days later. In total, 18 Patriots were captured and seven were killed; one British soldier suffered a single minor wound.

== Aftermath ==
After securing the town, Dunmore raised the British standard, and read out the text of his proclamation. The next day more than 100 militiamen who had previously opposed him swore an oath to the Crown, claiming that they had been forced into arms by the Patriots. Dunmore then moved on to Norfolk, where he again raised the standard, and began developing defenses in and around the town.

Woodford's force eventually reached Great Bridge, and was joined by companies from North Carolina. This threat prompted Dunmore to order an attack against them; in the December 9 Battle of Great Bridge Woodford won a decisive victory. Dunmore afterward withdrew from Norfolk, which was then burned on January 1, 1776, by a combination of Patriot and Loyalist action. He continued raiding operations against Virginia coastal communities until August 1776, when he departed for New York City.

Kemp's Landing incorporated in 1778 as Kempsville, and became the county seat for Princess Anne County. Princess Anne County was merged into Virginia Beach in 1963; Kempsville is now an urban neighborhood of the city.
