= Kempsville, Virginia =

Kempsville
- Unincorporated community
- Location within the Commonwealth of Virginia Kempsville (the United States)
- Coordinates: 36°49′37″N 76°09′37″W
- Country: United States
- State: Virginia
- Independent city: Virginia Beach
- Time zone: UTC−5 (Eastern (EST))
  - Summer (DST): UTC−4 (EDT)
- ZIP codes: 23464, 23462

Kempsville is a borough in the City of Virginia Beach, Virginia, a historic section with origins in US colonial times located in the former Princess Anne County. In modern times, it is a community within the urbanized portion of the independent city of Virginia Beach, the largest city in Virginia.

== History ==
Kempsville was originally called Kempe's Landing, and subsequently Kemp's Landing, after George Kempe, an industrious English immigrant, who in the 1600s acquired land along the Eastern Branch of the Elizabeth River and developed it into a port for the shipment of tobacco and other goods. Kemp's Landing was laid out into half acre lots which were sold at public auction after being advertised in the Virginia Gazette. The purchasers held the lots subject to building within three years a dwelling house at least 20 feet square with a brick chimney.

Tugs and sailing vessels (frequently two masted schooners) often came to Kempsville. A large drawbridge crossed the Eastern Branch of the Elizabeth River where the much smaller bridge of Princess Anne Road now crosses the river.

Kempsville was the shipping point for most of the products of Princess Anne County. The county was then a very large producer of corn and wheat. Several large warehouses lined the banks of the river which was then much wider than today. Great quantities of oak “knees” and all kinds of timber were shipped from Kempsville to Norfolk Navy Yard.

Until 1861 Kempsville was quite a busy place. It had a tobacco warehouse and an inspector whose salary was £35 a year. The warehouse receipts were used as currency. However, the growing of tobacco made little headway in the sandy soil of Princess Anne County.

A canal company was incorporated to connect the headwaters of the Eastern Branch of the Elizabeth River with the headwaters of the Lynnhaven River. The Commonwealth of Virginia government bought part of the stock of the canal company, but the Civil War put an end to digging of the canal and it was never finished.

From 1762 to 1770, George Logan, a Scot, was the Princess Anne County High Sheriff. From 1772 to 1775, George Logan was one of the Princess Anne County Justices. During the Revolution, George Logan was a Loyalist.

On November 14 or 15, 1775, John Ackiss, the son of a former member of the Virginia House of Burgesses and six others were killed by Colony of Virginia Governor Lord Dunmore's British forces during the Battle of Kemp's Landing. These seven men were the first American Revolutionary War casualties in Virginia. In 1929, the Daughters of the American Revolution erected a plaque "Skirmish of Kempsville" near the site.

On November 16, 1775, Lord Dunmore entered Kempsville in triumph. Dunmore captured the Colonial commander, then set up his headquarters at Logan's home. Those who swore an oath of allegiance to King George III wore a red badge on their breasts.

After the November 16, 1775, Battle of Kempsville, George Logan entertained Lord Dunmore at his home. This house became the home of Dr. R. E. Whitehead.

In 1778, the Princess Anne County Court House was moved to Kemp's Landing from New Town. From 1778 to 1824, Kempsville was the location of the county seat of Princess Anne County.

On August 13, 1779, nine African slaves were sold at public auction at Kempsville. They had been taken by the Continental frigates Boston and Deane then transported in the privateer Enterprise.

Also on August 13, 1779, the British sloop of war Mermaid was sold at public auction at Kempsville by order of the Admiralty Court then held at Hampton.

On May 5, 1783, the town of Kempsville was incorporated in Princess Anne County, Virginia.

On September 5, 1814, during the War of 1812, the Princess Anne County Court ordered that its records be moved to safety in North Carolina. On March 6, 1815, the Court ordered the clerk to retrieve its records from North Carolina. On July 28, 1815, the Court allocated money to six men to retrieve the records. In 1824, the county seat of Princess Anne County was moved to its current location at Princess Anne, Virginia.

In July 1843 the construction of Emmanuel Episcopal Church was completed on land that had been donated by David Walke. On November 27, 1843, the Right Reverend William Meade consecrated the Emmanuel Episcopal Church building.

Portions of the Emmanuel Episcopal Church's outer walls are original. The cemetery on the church grounds includes the graves of nine veterans of both the Confederate States of America and United States of America Armies who fought in the American Civil War. It also contains the more recent grave of Allen Jones "Al" "Two Gun" Gettel, a local boy who made his first pitch on the ball fields now preserved as Kempes Landing Park, and grew up to be a major league pitcher for the New York Yankees, the Cleveland Indians, and the Chicago White Sox over a 10-year career (1945–55).

The Princess Anne Academy was located at the old jail in Kempsville. The academy closed in 1850. The ancestors of many of the prominent families of the city of Norfolk and Princess Anne County attended the academy. For example, in December 1835 then again in 1838, the academy's principal trustee, Mr. Rogers, advertised in the Norfolk and Portsmouth Herald for a teacher for 1836 then 1839 of Latin, Greek, English and math, including the elements of Euclid if required.

In 1850, a number of prominent citizens of Kempsville advocated for a turnpike road from Norfolk to Kempsville. However, the road was not constructed until 1871 or 1872.

After Reconstruction, during an election, several African Americans were killed and many wounded in a riot. A number of European Americans were brought before the court but nothing came from this proceeding. In 1897, the tavern that had been erected on the former courthouse land was destroyed by fire.

In 1922, the former courthouse and jail were still in use. The former courthouse was remodeled in 1902.

In 1922, Kempsville was described as a charming rural village, featuring two churches, several general stores, and a modern brick school. The area boasted fertile soil, primarily supporting the cultivation of potatoes, cotton, corn, and various market crops.

== Formation of the City of Virginia Beach ==
In 1963, when the "new" city of Virginia Beach was created from the merger of the small oceanfront resort city of Virginia Beach and Princess Anne County, Kempsville became one of seven boroughs of the new city. The other six were Bayside, Blackwater, Lynnhaven, Princess Anne, Pungo, and Virginia Beach (oceanfront).

Kempsville grew in population during the explosive economic growth of the 1960s and 1970s. Kempsville transformed into a sprawling suburban community of the largest independent city in Virginia.

Many of the important historical buildings of Kempsville were either moved or torn down during this transformation. Only two buildings remain from the Revolutionary War period, including the Carraway House (built 1734) on South Witchduck Road and Pleasant Hall (1779).

== Present day ==
Kempsville is one of seven residence districts in the City of Virginia Beach, and is thereby associated with one seat on the city council. Although the official land area of the Kempsville district is small relative to the size of the City of Virginia Beach, Kempsville's historical influence stretches the entire span of Princess Anne Road from the Norfolk border to the Courthouse and Pungo areas of the city.

== Schools ==
The community of Kempsville operates under the Virginia Beach City Public School System. There are three public high schools, four public middle schools, and ten public elementary schools, respectively: Kempsville High School, Tallwood High School, Salem High School, Kempsville Middle School, Brandon Middle School, Larkspur Middle School, Salem Middle School, Arrowhead Elementary, Centerville Elementary, College Park Elementary, Fairfield Elementary, Indian Lakes Elementary, Kempsville Elementary, Kempsville Meadows Elementary, Point O'View Elementary, Providence Elementary, Tallwood Elementary, and Woodstock Elementary.

Catholic High School is a Roman Catholic high school located on Princess Anne Road.

Regent University, a private Christian facility founded in 1977 by Pat Robertson, is located in Kempsville, as are the Christian Broadcasting Network headquarters and The Founders Inn & Spa.

Virginia Beach Theological Seminary, a small Christian seminary offering a number of graduate degrees, is also located in this area.

== Public safety ==
The 4th Precinct is based in Kempsville giving the community police protection by the Virginia Beach Police Department. Fire protection is provided by the Virginia Beach Fire Department through Fire Station 9 and Fire Station 10 in the VBFD system. The Kempsville Volunteer Rescue Squad provides ambulance transportation and EMS services as part of the Virginia Beach Department of EMS.

== Commerce ==
The two major shopping centers in the Kempsville community are located directly across the street from each other on the Southwest and Northwest Corners of the Kempsville Road and Providence Road intersection. They are Providence Square and Fairfield Shopping Centers, respectively

About 0.1 miles north from the Kempsville Road and Providence Road intersection is the 4th VBPD Police Precinct Station, which is located next to the Kempsville Public Library. Also, across Kempsville Road is the Kempsville Presbyterian Church.

Kemps River Crossing is another major shopping center, taking its name from its location at the intersection of Kempsville and Indian River Roads.

Woods Corner is another major shopping center, located in "West Kempsville", at the intersection of Kempsville Road and Centerville Turnpike.

== Neighborhoods ==
Kempsville residential neighborhoods include Acredale, Arrowhead, Avalon Hills, Bellamy Manor, Bellamy Woods, Brandon, Brigadoon, Brigadoon Pines, Carolanne Farms, Charleston, Charleston Woods, Charleston Lakes South, College Park, Fairfield, Fox Run, Indian Lakes, Lake Christopher, Lake James, Larkspur Farms, Point O' View, Ridglea, Salem, Stratford Chase, and Whitehurst Landing.

Bellamy Woods is in the lowest 0.0% of neighborhoods dealing with child poverty. 86.2% of households speak English, with 7.5% speaking the Philippine language of Tagalog. The neighborhood features a public park that hosts regular annual events.

Point O' View is situated on the banks of Kemps Lake that formed from the construction of Interstate 264/Virginia Beach Expressway. Kemps Lake provides opportunities for water sports with its deepest point of 19 ft (5.8 m).
