= Burning of Norfolk =

1776 American Revolutionary War incident

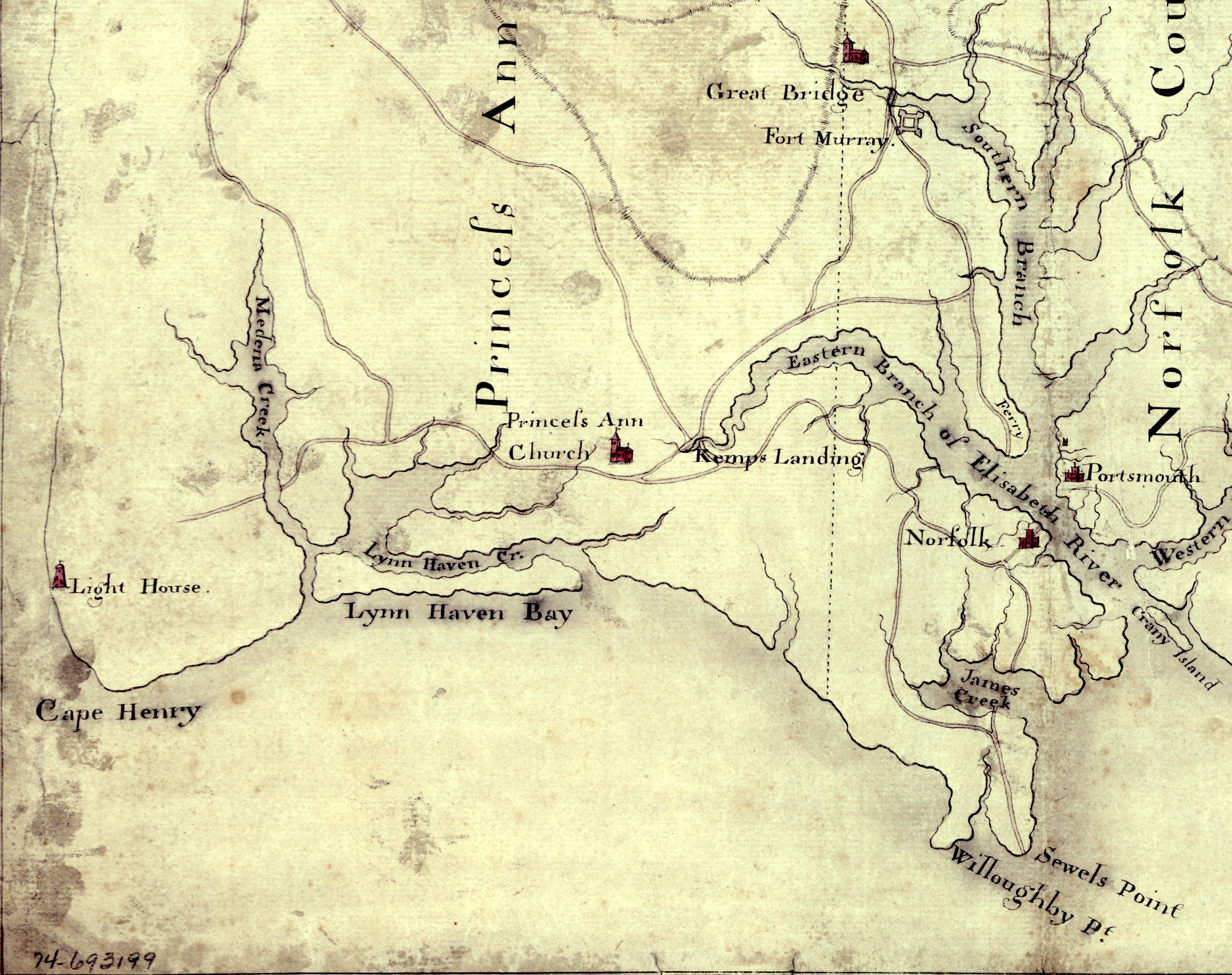
- Detail from a 1775 map showing the Norfolk area. Oriented with North to the bottom, Great Bridge is visible near the top of the map, and Norfolk is center-right.
- Date: January 1, 1776; 250 years ago
- Location: Norfolk, Virginia; 36°50′51″N 76°17′06″W
- Participants: (United States) Robert Howe (Kingdom of Great Britain) Lord Dunmore
- Outcome: Destruction of the town by combined action of British and Patriot forces

On January 1, 1776, during the American Revolutionary War, British Royal Navy ships began shelling Norfolk, Virginia, and landing parties came ashore to burn specific properties. The town, whose significantly Loyalist population had fled, was occupied by Patriot forces from Virginia and North Carolina. Although the Patriots worked to drive off the British landing parties, they did nothing to impede the progress of the flames, and began burning and looting Loyalist-owned property instead.

After three days, most of the town had been destroyed, mostly due to the action of Patriot forces. The destruction was completed by the Patriots in early February to deny use of even the remnants of the town to the British. Norfolk was the last significant foothold of British authority in Virginia; after raiding Virginia's coastal areas for a time, its last royal governor, Lord Dunmore, left for good in August 1776.

== Background ==
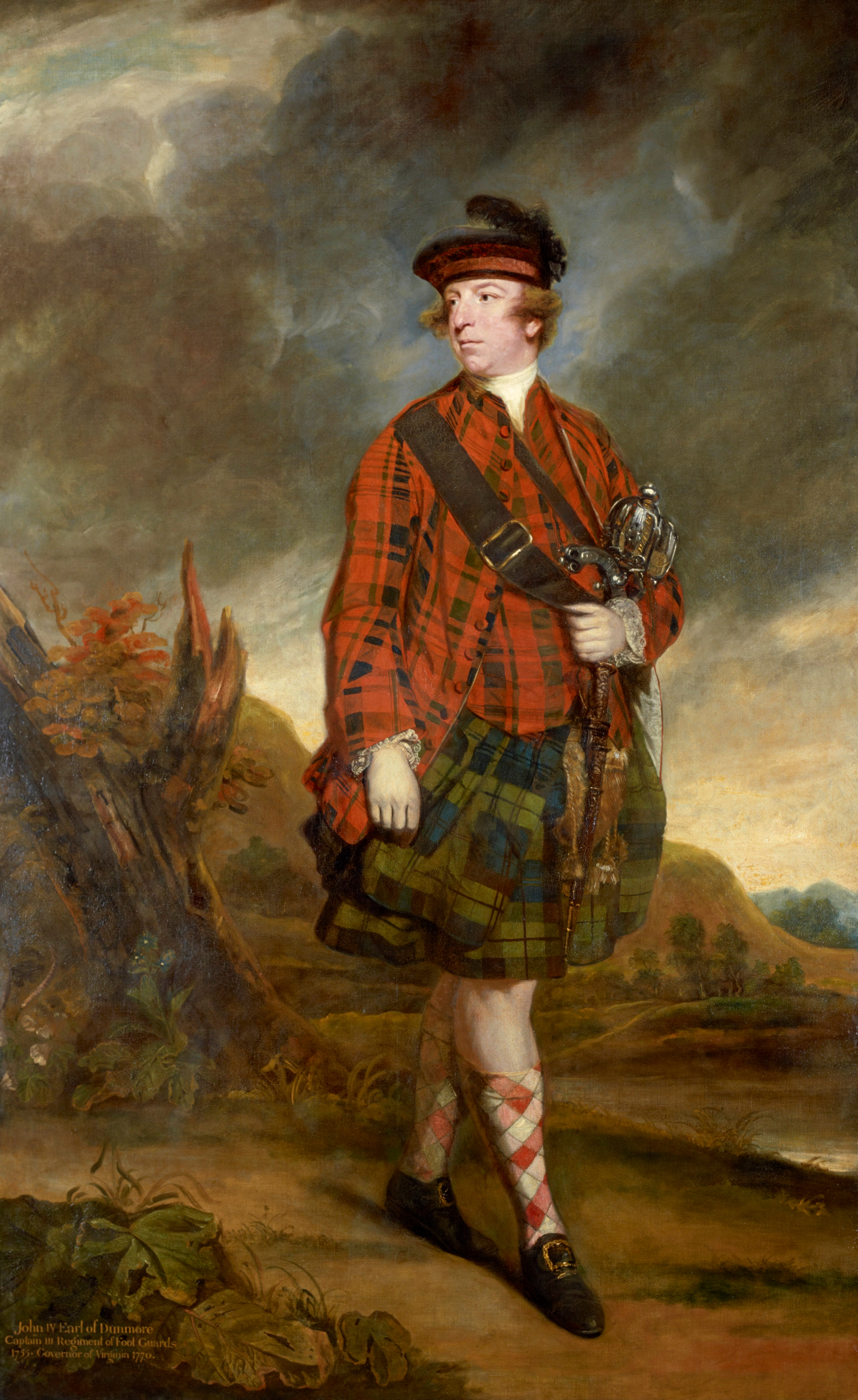
John Murray, 4th Earl of Dunmore

Tensions in the British Colony of Virginia were raised in April 1775 at roughly the same time that the hostilities of the American Revolutionary War broke out in the Province of Massachusetts Bay with the Battles of Lexington and Concord. Rebellious Patriots in control of the provincial assembly had begun recruiting troops in March 1775, leading to a struggle for control of the colony's military supplies. Under orders from John Murray, 4th Earl of Dunmore, the royal governor of Virginia, British marines removed gunpowder from the colonial storehouse in Williamsburg to a Royal Navy ship, alarming colonial legislators and prompting a militia uprising. Although the incident was resolved without violence, Dunmore, fearing for his personal safety, left Williamsburg in June 1775 and placed his family on board a Royal Navy ship. A small British fleet then took shape at Norfolk, a port town whose merchants had significant Loyalist tendencies. Although the town did have some Patriot support, the threat posed by the British fleet may have played a role in minimizing their activity in the town.

1781 British map showing forts in the Norfolk/Portsmouth area. Fort Nelson is the fort on "Mill Point". The Revolutionary War fort on the site of the later Fort Norfolk is also shown.

Confrontations and minor skirmishes continued in Virginia between Patriots on one side and Tories on the other until October, when Dunmore had acquired enough military support to begin organized operations against the Patriots. General Thomas Gage, the British commander-in-chief for North America, had ordered a small detachment of the 14th Regiment of Foot to Virginia in response to pleas by Dunmore for military help. These troops began raiding surrounding counties for rebel military supplies on October 12. This activity continued through the end of October, when a small British ship ran aground and was captured by Patriot forces during a skirmish near Hampton. Navy boats sent to punish the townspeople were repulsed by Continental Army troops and militia in a brief gunfight that resulted in the killing and capture of several sailors. Dunmore reacted to this event by issuing a proclamation on November 7 in which he declared martial law, and offered to emancipate Patriot-owned slaves in Virginia willing to serve in the British forces. The proclamation alarmed Tory and Patriot slaveholders alike, concerned by the idea of armed former slaves and the potential loss of their property. Nevertheless, Dunmore was able to recruit enough slaves to form the Ethiopian Regiment, as well as raising a company of Tories he called the Queen's Own Loyal Virginia Regiment. These local forces supplemented the two companies of the 14th Foot that were the sole British military presence in the colony. This successful recruiting drive prompted Dunmore to write on November 30, 1775, that he would soon be able to "reduce this colony to a proper sense of their duty."

Virginia's assembly had sent companies of militia to Hampton under the command of William Woodford, the colonel of the 2nd Virginia Regiment in October, and further militia continued to arrive at Williamsburg. Woodford, his force swollen to 700 men, advanced toward Great Bridge in early December. Some of Dunmore's troops had fortified the north side of the bridge, so Woodford began entrenching the position on his side of the bridge, while more and more militia companies arrived from the surrounding counties and North Carolina. On December 9, British troops attempted to disperse Woodford's force, and were decisively repulsed. Following the battle, the British retreated back into Norfolk, and shortly after, Dunmore and his entire force withdrew to Royal Navy ships anchored in Norfolk's harbor, along with most of the remaining Loyalist population of the town. Woodford's force continued to grow with the arrival of Colonel Robert Howe and North Carolina regulars the day after the battle.

== Continental Army occupation of Norfolk ==
On December 14, with the Patriot ranks being swelled by further militia arrivals to about 1,200, Howe and Woodford moved into Norfolk. Since Colonel Howe held a senior Continental Army commission, he outranked Woodford, and assumed command of the occupying forces. He adopted a hard line in dealings with Dunmore and the Royal Navy captains, denying the delivery of supplies to the overcrowded ships, and insisting on parity in the exchange of prisoners.

Howe and Woodford were also concerned about the possibility of a British attack, and at first appealed for additional troops. However, on further consideration they realized that the British fleet could easily maneuver around the town and isolate the garrison. They consequently recommended to the Virginia assembly that the town be abandoned and rendered useless to their enemy.

On December 20 the Liverpool arrived, accompanied by a store ship loaded with supplies and munitions. Dunmore positioned four ships, the Dunmore, the Liverpool, the Otter, and the Kingfisher in a threatening line along the town's waterfront, setting off an exodus of people and possessions from the town. On Christmas Eve, Liverpool's captain, Henry Bellew, sent what amounted to an ultimatum into the town, stating that he preferred to purchase provisions instead of taking them by force. Howe rejected the ultimatum, and prepared for a bombardment. On December 30, Bellew demanded that Patriot forces cease parading and changing the guard on the waterfront because he found it offensive, and suggested that it would "not be imprudent" for women and children to leave the town. Howe refused to withdraw his men, telling Bellew "I am too much an Officer [...] to recede from any point which I conceive to be my duty."

== Burning and looting ==
On New Year's Day 1776, Howe's guards paraded as they had before. Between 3:00 and 4:00 pm, the four ships of the British fleet opened fire on the town. Mounting more than 100 guns, they cannonaded the town well into the evening hours. Landing parties were sent ashore, some to obtain provisions, others to set fire to buildings that Patriot marksmen had been using as posts from which to fire on the fleet. Although the British movements were not particularly well coordinated, they succeeded in setting most of the waterfront ablaze.

Patriot militiamen resisted the landing parties, but did little to stop the flames, which were spread by advantageous winds. Some Loyalist properties were targeted for burning and looting by the Patriots shortly after the bombardment began, including a local distillery. Although the British ended their operations that day, the fires continued to rage; the next morning Colonel Howe reported that "the whole town will I doubt not be consum'd in a day or two." The burning and looting by the occupying Patriots continued for three days. By the time order was restored, much of the town had been destroyed.

== Aftermath ==
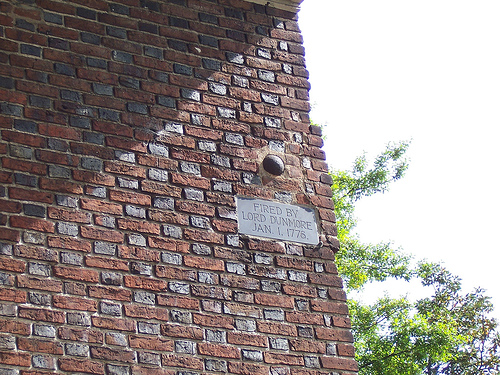
Cannonball on display where it struck St. Paul's Episcopal Church in Norfolk

Damage to the town by Patriot forces significantly exceeded that done by the British, destroying 863 buildings valued at £120,000 (an estimated £17 million in modern pounds sterling). In comparison, the British bombardment destroyed only 19 properties worth £3,000 (£430,000); this was in addition to £2,000 (£280,000) in damages done by Lord Dunmore during the British occupation of Norfolk. Howe's report to the Virginia Convention omitted the role of Patriot forces in the burning, and repeated the recommendation that the town be destroyed. A newspaper account published by Lord Rawdon prompted some questions in Patriot circles about the event, but many assumed that British forces were responsible for most of the damage, and no inquiries were made in the immediate aftermath. The convention approved Howe's plan, and by February 6 the remaining 416 structures had been destroyed. It was not until 1777 that the full extent of Patriot participation in the burning was acknowledged.

Patriot forces withdrew from the ruins of the town after completing its destruction, and took up posts in other nearby towns. They were further organized in March, when General Charles Lee arrived to take command of the Continental Army's Southern Department. He mobilized the militia to evict Dunmore from a camp he had established near Portsmouth; Dunmore finally abandoned Virginia for good in August 1776. While the lands at an already established Fort Nelson and what would later become Fort Norfolk had been fortified, these defensive positions were too weak to prevent the British Royal Navy from bombarding Norfolk. As a result, following the war, the U.S. Federal Government bought the fortified land in Norfolk and established Fort Norfolk. Both fortifications were reinforced and used to prevent any further naval assaults on the cities which lie on the Elizabeth River. There is a marker at St. Paul's Boulevard and City Hall Avenue in Norfolk commemorating the action.

== See also ==
- Burning of Falmouth
- List of American Revolutionary War battles

== General references ==
- Kranish, Michael (2010). Flight from Monticello: Thomas Jefferson at War. New York: Oxford University Press USA. ISBN 978-0-19-537462-9. OCLC 320524730.
- Russell, David Lee (2000). The American Revolution in the Southern colonies. Jefferson, NC: McFarland. ISBN 978-0-7864-0783-5. OCLC 248087936.
- Salmon, John S; Peters, Margaret; Virginia Department of Historic Resources (1994). A Guidebook to Virginia's Historical Markers. Charlottesville, VA: University of Virginia Press. ISBN 978-0-8139-1491-6. OCLC 29182310.
- Selby, John E; Higginbotham, Don (2007). The Revolution in Virginia, 1775–1783. Williamsburg, VA: Colonial Williamsburg. ISBN 978-0-87935-233-2. OCLC 124076712.
- Ward, Christopher (1952). The War of the Revolution. New York: Macmillan. OCLC 214962727.
- Wilson, David K (2005). The Southern Strategy: Britain's conquest of South Carolina and Georgia, 1775–1780. Columbia, SC: University of South Carolina Press. ISBN 1-57003-573-3. OCLC 232001108.
