= Porto Bello (Williamsburg, Virginia) =

Historic hunting lodge in Virginia, US

- U.S. National Register of Historic Places
- Virginia Landmarks Register
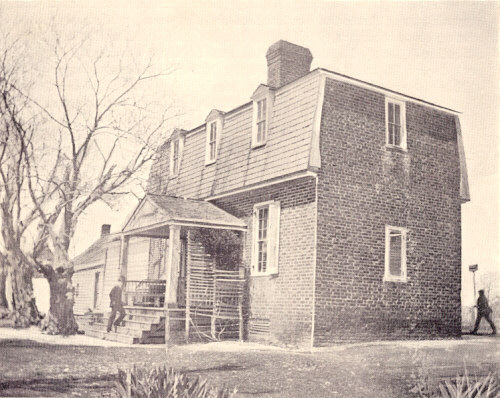
- Porto Bello, photograph taken approximately 1900

- Location within Virginia Location within the United States
- Location: Camp Peary, York County, Virginia, United States of America
- Nearest city: Williamsburg, Virginia
- Coordinates: 37°18′2.2″N 76°38′40.28″W
- Area: 15 acres (6.1 ha)
- Built: Before 1774
- Architectural style: Colonial Farmhouse
- Demolished: Late 1700s
- Restored: Early 1800s
- NRHP reference No.: 73002068
- VLR No.: 099-0050

Significant dates
- Added to NRHP: April 13, 1973
- Designated VLR: November 9, 1972

Porto Bello was the hunting lodge of the last Royal Governor of the British Colony of Virginia, John Murray, 4th Earl of Dunmore. The name commemorates the battle of Porto Bello, a 1739 British naval victory in Panama. Lord Dunmore fled to Porto Bello to escape the early stages of the American Revolution in Williamsburg, Virginia. He later boarded a British ship lying at anchor near Porto Bello in the York River.

Porto Bello is located in York County, Virginia on the grounds of Camp Peary. It was listed on the National Register of Historic Places in 1972, but is closed to visitors because of the restricted access to Camp Peary.

== Geography and history of property ==
Porto Bello was a 2-story brick farmhouse owned by Lord Dunmore from 1773 to the late 1770s. It is located in central York County on a wooded hill north of Queen's Creek.

In a 1782 map, the building is shown to have five buildings, consisting of a residence, a kitchen, and three other much smaller outbuildings; however, it was written to have up to ten outbuildings while under the ownership of Dunmore including a large barn, cow houses, stables, and work shops.

The complex, despite its size, was never truly used as a permanent residence, and it was instead used as a hunting lodge or retreat.

Although usually considered the actual house occupied by Lord Dunmore, the house exhibits properties that resemble features of houses built in the early 1800s. Instead, a geographic depression north of the structure may be the site of the earlier house. In 1915, the modern house had an internal fire that left everything decimated but the walls. As a result of the fire, the roof was replaced from a gambrel roof to a mansard roof and the interior plan was changed.

The original plan, remembered by a former occupant, was described as having two floors each with two rooms. In the center was a chimney. Between the chimney and the front wall was an entrance hall, and behind it were stairs to the second floor.

The date of construction of the house was never written, but it was known to have been constructed in or before 1774.

== Significance and ownership ==
The earliest known owner of the land that would become Porto Bello was John James Hullotte. In 1758 the York County court ordered that Hullotte give back gambling money that he had gained. Hullotte refused and his land was repossessed and given to Alexander Finnie, the man whom he owed money to. Finnie died 11 years later, in 1769. The land was then auctioned off to John Prentis in December. Prentis then, for reasons unknown, conveyed Porto Bello to William and Rachel Drummond in November 1770.

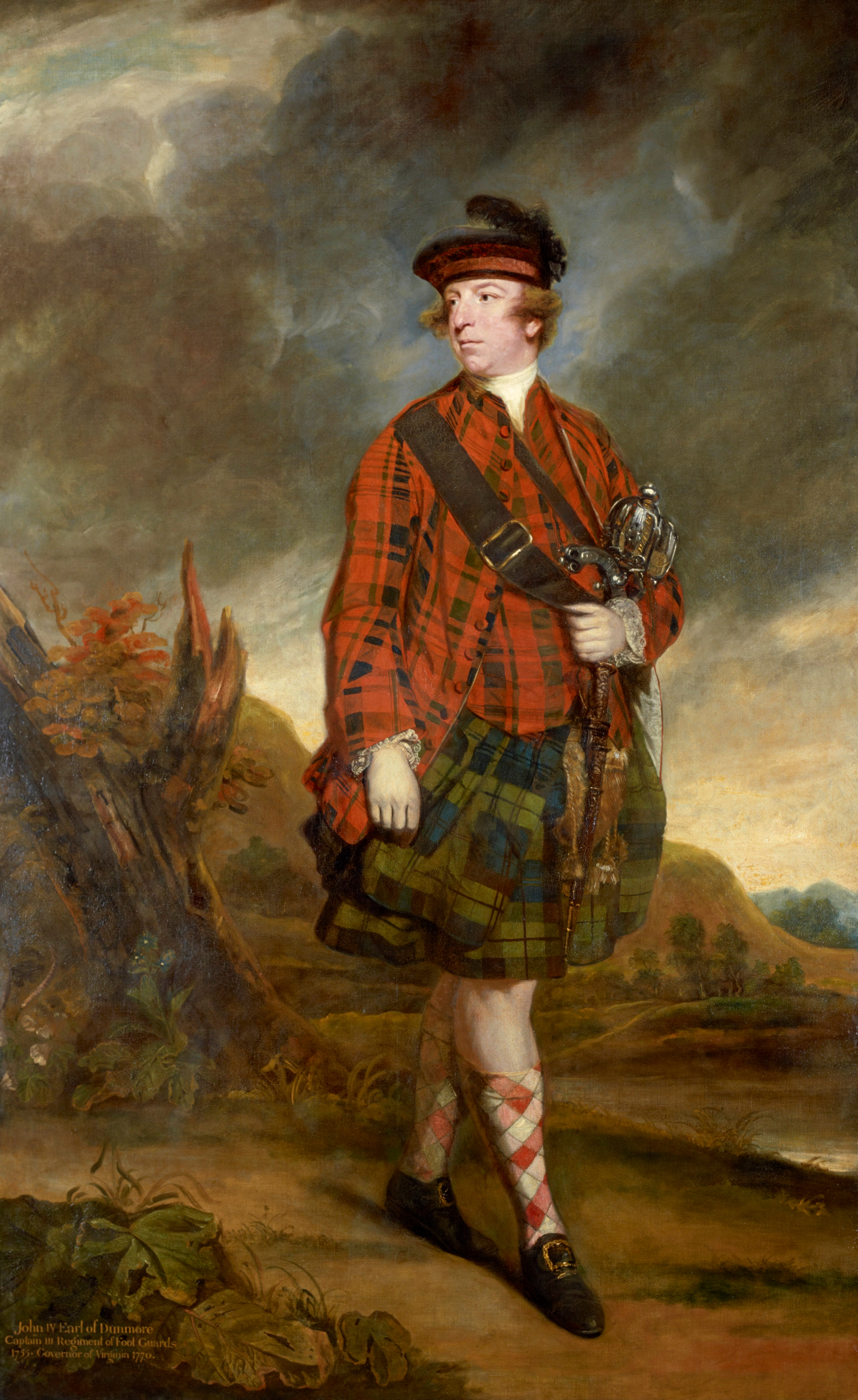
John Murray, Fourth Earl of Dunmore, 1765

William Drummond died in 1773 and it was bought by Lord Dunmore some time later that year after a short controversy with Drummond's wife who accused him of interfering with the sale of the property.

Lord Dunmore retained ownership of the house for the next two years despite only utilizing it as his retreat or hunting lodge.

In early 1775 Virginians began to organize militia companies and equip themselves. Lord Dunmore, who was a loyalist and sought to end the growing resistance, ordered Lieutenant Henry Collins to take the guns within the Williamsburg Magazine and place them on the British armed schooner Magdalen. The Virginian populous, angry with the distrust and loyalty of Dunmore, grew to rebellion and Patrick Henry placed a militia outside of Williamsburg on May 2. Dunmore then fled to Porto Bello and then to HMS Fowey.

Two months later, on July 7, Dunmore returned to Porto Bello, but was quickly chased out by a group of irate citizens from Williamsburg whom he narrowly avoided. He never returned to Porto Bello.

After Lord Dunmore fled, the Virginian authorities rented the land to a Dr. James Carter until 1779 when the county escheator sold it to a man named Francis Bright. The Bright family owned the property for about half to three quarters of a century. After Francis Bright died sometime in the early 1800s, his son, Samuel Bright, gained the property until he died in the mid-1800s.

The property was owned by multiple people for the rest of the nineteenth century, and was owned by the Mahone family in 1915 when a fire gutted the property. Later, the property was sold to the United States Federal Government in the beginning of World War II for the construction of Camp Peary.
