= Abaco Slave Revolt =

Date	1787 or 1788
Location	Abaco Islands
Result	British victory. Granted amnesty to rebel slaves who could prove their freedom.

Belligerents
Britain	Slaves

Commanders and leaders
John Murray	Unknown

Units involved
Unknown	Unknown

Strength
Unknown	Unknown

The Abaco Slave Revolt was the first recorded slave revolt in the Bahamas. It occurred in 1787 or 1788 and on the Abaco Islands.

== Revolt ==
On 1787 or 1788, multiple black slaves revolted against their white counterparts on the Abaco Islands with firearms and other weapons.
