= Dunmore's Proclamation =

1775 declaration by the governor of Virginia

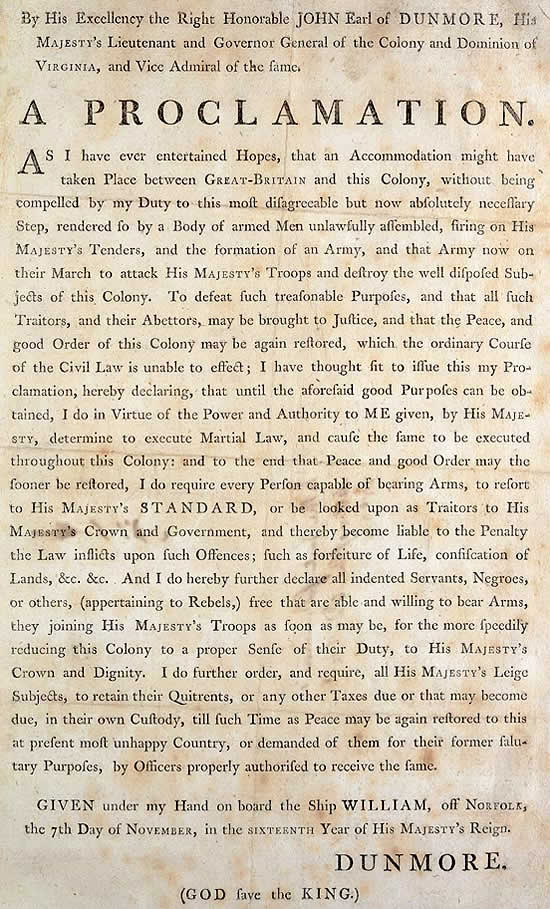
- Created: November 7, 1775
- Presented: November 14, 1775
- Author: John Murray, 4th Earl of Dunmore
- Purpose: To declare martial law, and to encourage indentured servants and slaves of rebels in Virginia to leave their masters and support the Loyalist cause.

Full text
- Dunmore's Proclamation at Wikisource

Dunmore's Proclamation is a historical document signed on November 7, 1775, by John Murray, 4th Earl of Dunmore, royal governor of the British colony of Virginia. The proclamation declared martial law in the colony, and promised freedom for "all indented servants, negroes, or others", who joined the British Army (see also Black Loyalists).

Formally proclaimed on November 15, its publication prompted between 800 and 2,000 slaves to run away and enlist with Dunmore. It also raised a furor among Virginia's slave-owning elites (including those who had been sympathetic to Britain), to whom the possibility of a slave rebellion was a major fear. The proclamation ultimately failed in meeting Dunmore's objectives; he was forced out of the colony in 1776, taking about 300 former slaves with him.

Later British commanders over the course of the American Revolutionary War followed Dunmore's model in enticing slaves to defect—the 1779 Philipsburg Proclamation, which applied across all the colonies, was more successful. By the end of the war, at least 20,000 slaves had escaped from plantations into British service.

== Background ==
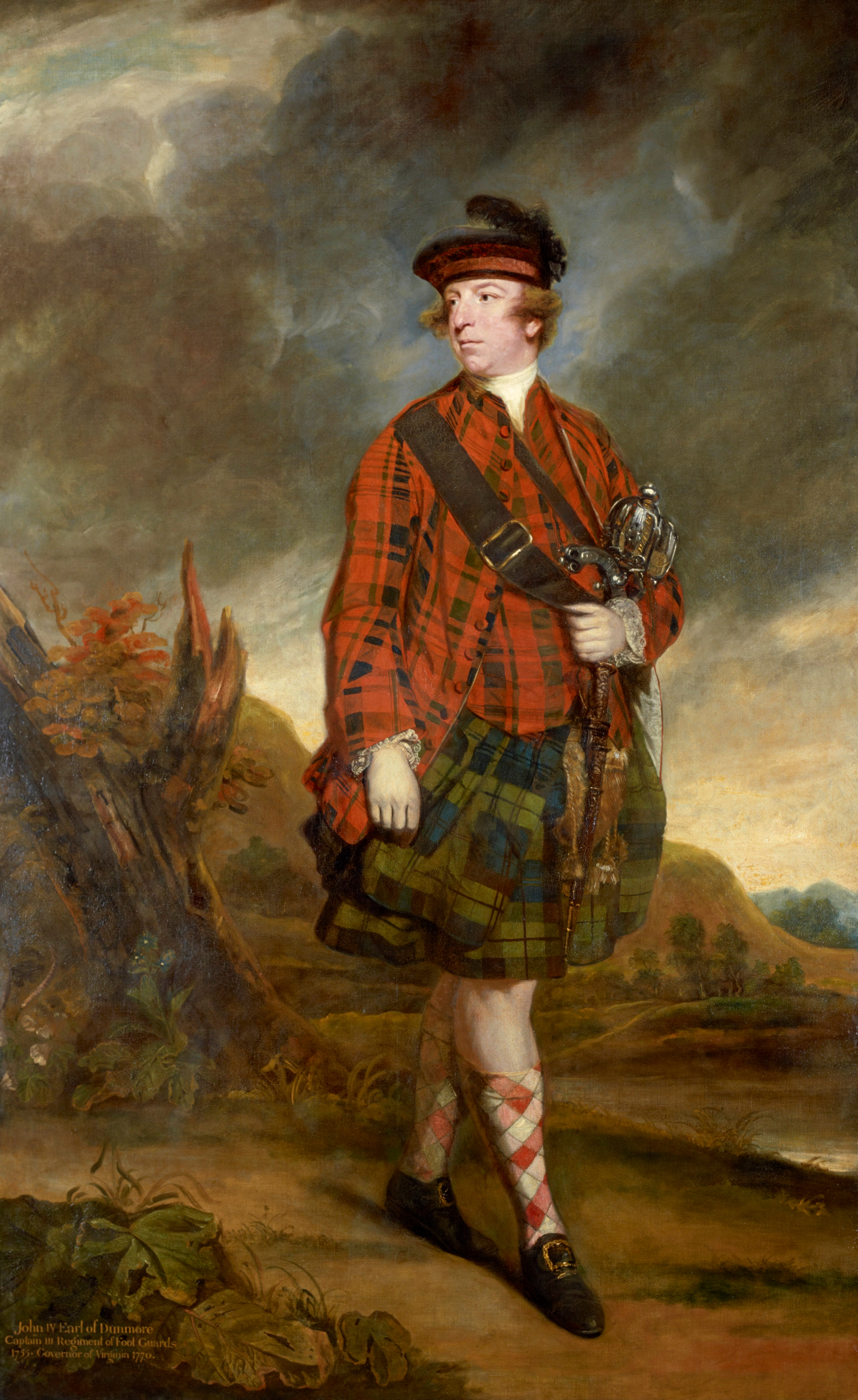
Portrait of Lord Dunmore by Joshua Reynolds, 1765

John Murray, 4th Earl of Dunmore, originally from Scotland, was briefly the royal governor of the Province of New York before being named governor of Virginia in 1771 after the previous governor, Norborne Berkeley, 4th Baron Botetourt died. During his tenure, he worked proactively to extend Virginia's western borders past the Appalachian Mountains, despite the British Royal Proclamation of 1763. He notably defeated the Shawnee nation in Dunmore's War, gaining land south of the Ohio River. As unpopular legislation, such as the Stamp Act 1765, engendered growing discontent with British rule, Dunmore changed his attitude towards the colonists; he became frustrated with the lack of respect towards the British Crown. Dunmore's popularity worsened after, following orders, he attempted to prevent the election of representatives to the Second Continental Congress.

On April 21, 1775, he ordered the seizure of the colony's store of gunpowder, an action that resulted in the formation of an angry mob in Williamsburg, the capital city. The colonists argued that the ammunition belonged to them, not to the British Crown, and demanded compensation or its return. The crowd was calmed before violence erupted and payment for the powder was eventually extracted, but Dunmore angrily swore that "if any injury or insult was offered to himself [...] he would declare freedom to the slaves and reduce the City of Williamsburg to ashes". This undiplomatic threat alienated many of the slaveholding class who had been his most important supporters, and accelerated Dunmore's loss of effectiveness as actual governor of the colony.

As the continuing unrest threatened to become violent, Dunmore fled the Governor's Palace on June 8 and took refuge aboard the frigate HMS Fowey at Yorktown. For several months, Dunmore's small navy raided the rebels' military supplies and looted riverside plantations, while inviting the slaves working in the fields to enlist. On November 14, 1775, Dunmore seized on the success of a minor skirmish with rebel militiamen to officially publicize his proclamation, making it known that Virginia was in a state of martial law, and that slaves desirous of freedom could obtain it by joining the British Army.

== Dunmore's Proclamation ==
By His Excellency the Right Honorable JOHN Earl of DUNMORE, His / Majesty's Lieutenant and Governor General of the Colony and Dominion of / Virginia, and Vice Admiral of the same.

A PROCLAMATION.

As I have ever entertained Hopes that an Accommodation might have / taken Place between Great-Britain and this colony, without being / compelled by my Duty to this most disagreeable but now absolutely necessary / Step, rendered so by a Body of armed Men unlawfully assembled, bring on His / MAJESTY'S Tenders, and the formation of an Army, and that Army now on / their March to attack His MAJESTY'S troops and destroy the well disposed Sub- / jects of this Colony. To defeat such unreasonable Purposes, and that all such / Traitors, and their Abetters, may be brought to Justice, and that the Peace, and / good Order of this Colony may be again restored, which the ordinary Course / of the Civil Law is unable to effect; I have thought fit to issue this my Pro- / clamation, hereby declaring, that until the aforesaid good Purposes can be ob- / tained, I do in Virtue of the Power and Authority to ME given, by His MAJE- / STY, determine to execute Martial Law, and cause the same to be executed / throughout this Colony: and to the end that Peace and good Order may the / sooner be restored, I do require every Person capable of bearing Arms, to resort / to His MAJESTY'S STANDARD, or be looked upon as Traitors to His / MAJESTY'S Crown and Government, and thereby become liable to the Penalty / the Law inflicts upon such Offences; such as forfeiture of Life, confiscation of / Lands, &c. &c. And I do hereby further declare all indentured Servants, Negroes, / or others, (appertaining to Rebels,) free that are able and willing to bear Arms, / they joining His MAJESTY'S Troops as soon as may be, for the more speedily / reducing this Colony to a proper Sense of their Duty, to His MAJESTY'S / Crown and Dignity. I do further order, and require, all His MAJESTY'S Leige / Subjects, to retain their Quitrents, or any other Taxes due or that may become / due, in their own Custody, till such Time as Peace may be again restored to this / at present most unhappy Country, or demanded of them for their former salu- / tary Purposes, by Officers properly authorised to receive the same.

GIVEN under my Hand on board the ship WILLIAM, off Norfolk / the 7th Day of November, in the sixteenth Year of His MAJESTY'S Reign.

DUNMORE.

(GOD save the KING.)

In the official document, he declared martial law and adjudged all Patriots as traitors to the Crown. Furthermore, the document declared "all indentured servants, Negroes, or others [...] free that are able and willing to bear arms." Dunmore expected such a revolt to have several effects. Primarily, it would bolster his own forces, which, cut off from reinforcements from British-held Boston, numbered only around 300 men. Secondarily, he hoped that such an action would create a fear among the colonists of a general slave uprising and would force them to abandon the revolution.

== Colonial reaction ==
Colonial leaders were quick to express their outrage over this escalation. On December 4, the Continental Congress recommended to Virginia that they resist Dunmore "to the uttermost". Edward Rutledge wrote that the proclamation was more effective in working "an eternal separation between Great Britain and the Colonies... than any other expedient." Virginia's chief statesmen, assembled in the Fourth Virginia Convention, responded on December 14, 1775, with a declaration that all fugitive slaves would be executed:

WHEREAS Lord Dunmore, by his proclamation, dated on board the ship William, off Norfolk, the 7th day of November 1775, hath offered freedom to such able-bodied slaves as are willing to join him, and take up arms, against the good people of this colony, giving thereby encouragement to a general insurrection, which may induce a necessity of inflicting the severest punishments upon those unhappy people, already deluded by his base and insidious arts; and whereas, by an act of the General Assembly now in force in this colony, it is enacted, that all negro or other slaves, conspiring to rebel or make insurrection, shall suffer death, and be excluded all benefit of clergy: We think it proper to declare, that all slaves who have been, or shall be seduced, by his lordship's proclamation, or other arts, to desert their masters' service, and take up arms against the inhabitants of this colony, shall be liable to such punishment as shall hereafter be directed by the General Convention. And to that end all such, who have taken this unlawful and wicked step, may return in safety to their duty, and escape the punishment due to their crimes, we hereby promise pardon to them, they surrendering themselves to Col. William Woodford, or any other commander of our troops, and not appearing in arms after the publication hereof. And we do farther earnestly recommend it to all humane and benevolent persons in this colony to explain and make known this our offer of mercy to those unfortunate people.

Newspapers such as The Virginia Gazette published the proclamation in full, and slave patrols were organized to look for any slaves attempting to take Dunmore up on his offer; Patriot newspapers claimed without evidence that Dunmore was actually planning on selling the escaped slaves in the West Indies. The Virginia Gazette cautioned slaves to "be not then... tempted by the proclamation to ruin your selves", and stated that those who attempted to seek freedom with the British would "provoke the fury of the Americans against their defenceless fathers and mothers, their wives, and children". Ironically, due to the pressing American need for war funds, the penalty of execution for runaways was frequently set aside so that they could be sold into slavery in the West Indies or Bay of Honduras. The American historian Gary B. Nash argued that "Dunmore's Proclamation reverberated throughout the colonies and became a major factor in convincing white colonists that reconciliation with the mother country was impossible", and noted that Dunmore became an "African Hero" who led Black Americans across the Thirteen Colonies to challenge the existing racial hierarchy.

Estimates of the number of slaves that reached Dunmore vary, but generally range between 800 and 2,000. The escaped slaves Dunmore accepted were enlisted into what was known as Dunmore's Ethiopian Regiment. The only notable battle in which Dunmore's regiment participated was the Battle of Great Bridge in early December 1775, which was a decisive British loss. Dunmore's dream of a massive slave army was ultimately unrealized, as his forces were decimated by outbreaks of smallpox and typhoid fever almost as soon as they started gathering in cramped ships and encampments. When Dunmore finally left the colony in 1776 he took only 300 former slaves with him, all that remained of about 2,000 that had flocked to his promise of freedom. In 1779, British General Sir Henry Clinton issued the Philipsburg Proclamation, which freed slaves owned by American Patriots throughout the rebel states, even if they did not enlist in the British Army. It resulted in a significantly larger number of runaways. It is estimated that approximately 20,000 attempted to leave their owners and join the British over the course of the entire war. At the end of the war, the British relocated about 3,000 former slaves to Nova Scotia.

== Parliament ==
In England, also, a reaction was garnered to Dunmore's Proclamation. Edmund Burke stood in opposition to the measure arguing that it could lead to the slaughter of the king's own subjects, noting "what murders, rapes, and enormities of all kinds, were in the contemplation of all negroes who meditated an insurrection" as a result of the proclamation by Lord Dunmore.

A petition to the Crown was issued by a group of merchants based in London with interests in the slave colonies of the West Indies, expressing their "indignation and horror" at the prospect of slaves being pitted against masters in armed conflict.

== See also ==
- Black Loyalist
- Emancipation Proclamation
- Slavery in the colonial history of the United States

== Bibliography ==
- David, James Corbett (2013). Dunmore's New World: The Extraordinary Life of a Royal Governor in Revolutionary America. University of Virginia Press. ISBN 978-0-8139-3425-9.
- Gilbert, Alan. Black Patriots and Loyalists: Fighting for Emancipation in the War for Independence (University of Chicago Press, 2012)
- Kukla, Jon (2017). Patrick Henry: Champion of Liberty. New York, NY: Simon and Schuster. ISBN 978-1-4391-9081-4.
- Piecuch, Jim. Three Peoples, One King: Loyalists, Indians, and Slaves in the Revolutionary South, 1775–1782 (Univ of South Carolina Press, 2008)
- Pybus, Cassandra (2005). "Jefferson's Faulty Math: The Question of Slave Defections in the American Revolution". The William and Mary Quarterly. 3. 62 (2): 243–264. doi:10.2307/3491601. JSTOR 3491601.
- Quarles, Benjamin (1958). "Lord Dunmore as Liberator". The William and Mary Quarterly. 3. 15 (4): 494–507. doi:10.2307/2936904. JSTOR 2936904.
