= Joseph Hutchings =

18th-century Virginia politician and militia colonel

Member of the Virginia House of Burgesses
- In office 1761–1775
- Constituency: Norfolk Borough

Personal details
- Died: c. December 1775 Elizabeth River, Province of Virginia
- Party: Patriot / Whig
- Occupation: Merchant, politician, militia officer
- Military career
- Allegiance: Virginia (Committee of Safety)
- Branch: Virginia Militia / Minutemen
- Rank: Colonel
- Commands: Norfolk County Minutemen
- Conflicts: Battle of Kemp's Landing

Joseph Hutchings (died c. December 1775) was an American merchant, politician, and militia officer from Norfolk, Virginia, who served as a long-standing member of the Virginia House of Burgesses. He supported the Patriot movement. Hutchings also co-signed the Virginia Nonimportation Resolutions and helped organize the call for the First Continental Congress. During the American Revolutionary War, he commanded the Patriot forces at the Battle of Kemp's Landing in 1775, where he was captured and subsequently died in British custody.

== Civic and political career ==
Hutchings was born into a prominent, wealthy tidewater mercantile family, the son of Colonel John Hutchings, who served thrice as the mayor of Norfolk and as a burgess. Hutchings entered politics and was elected to represent the Norfolk Borough in the Virginia House of Burgesses in 1761. He served continuously across multiple legislative assemblies for fourteen years until royal governance collapsed in 1775.

As tensions grew, Hutchings joined the Whig movement. In May 1769, after the royal governor dissolved the assembly, Hutchings joined George Washington, Thomas Jefferson, and Patrick Henry at the Raleigh Tavern to sign the Virginia Nonimportation Resolutions, an embargo protesting the Townshend Acts. In 1774, he signed the Association of Members of the Late House of Burgesses, which officially called for a convention of the colonies, directly resulting in the formation of the First Continental Congress. he ran a shipping business and was appointed Colonel of the newly formed Norfolk County Minutemen.

== Revolutionary War and capture ==
Following the outbreak of the American Revolution in April, 1775, the Virginia Committee of Safety tasked Hutchings with regional defense against the royal governor, Lord Dunmore. On November 15, 1775, upon learning that Dunmore had landed a detachment of British infantry near Great Bridge, Hutchings and fellow officer Anthony Lawson mobilized approximately 170 local militiamen to intercept them.

During the ensuing Battle of Kemp's Landing, the militiamen fired early and ruined their ambush.British forces counter-attacked and broke the line and routed the militia into the surrounding swamps. During the retreat, Hutchings fired point-blank at an approaching royal soldier and missed; the soldier, an escaped slave formerly held by the Hutchings family, wounded Hutchings with a sword and took him prisoner.

== Imprisonment and death ==
Hutchings was held as a P.O.W. in the Norfolk gaol. After a fire destroyed the building on November 30, 1775, British forces transferred Hutchings and other prisoners to crowded military prison ships anchored in the Elizabeth River. He became sick because of the poor conditions on the ships. Although a formal parole exchange had been successfully negotiated by his allies, Hutchings died in British custody aboard the prison fleet in December 1775 before he could be released.
