= HMS Fowey (1749) =

Frigate of the Royal Navy

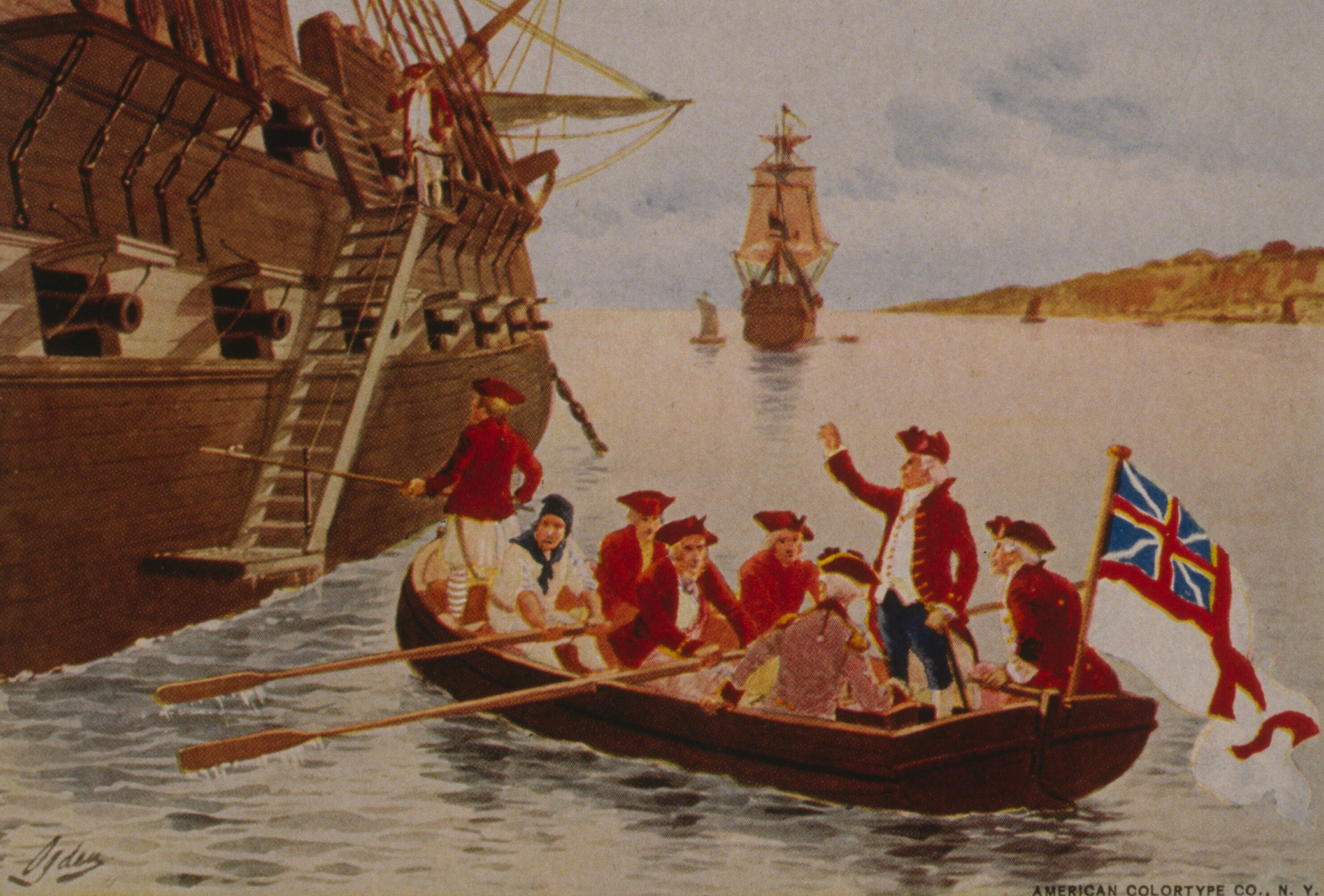
- Lord Dunmore fleeing to Fowey on 8 June 1775

History

Great Britain
- Name: HMS Fowey
- Owner: Royal Navy
- Builder: Janvrin, Lepe
- In service: 1749
- Fate: Sunk in action October 10, 1781

General characteristics
- Class & type: 6th rate frigate
- Tons burthen: 513 bm
- Length: 113 ft 6 in (34.6 m)
- Beam: 32 ft (9.8 m)
- Propulsion: Sail (three masts, ship rig)
- Sail plan: Full-rigged ship
- Armament: 24 cannons

HMS Fowey was a 24-gun sixth-rate frigate of the Royal Navy. Built in 1749, the ship was sunk in action with the French during the Siege of Yorktown in 1781. Mark Robinson was appointed to the Fowey, a 6th Rate of 24 guns, on 13 June 1767, at Sheerness, and sailed via Spithead, to Plymouth, and thence to Madeira in September, and on to the East Coast of the American colonies, arriving at Charleston on 28 October 1767, relieving the Sardoine. "Pennsylvania Gazetter December 1767 Nov. 6. Captain Mark Robinson, of his Majesty ship Fowey, of 28 guns, who arrived here last week from Great Britain, is commanding officer, or Commodore of all his Majesty’s ships from Virginia to Cape Florida, including the Bahama Islands. Commodore Hood, stationed at Halifax, commands as far south as New York, and, it is said, a third Commodore will be stationed at Virginia." The itinerary of the Fowey, with Mark Robinson in command was Charleston in 1768, Rebellion Roads (July 1768), Charleston, Sandy Hook, Louisburg (October 1768, Halifax, Charleston (January 1769) Cape Fear Charleston, Fort Royal (June 1769), Charleston, Halifax, Charleston, leaving the Fowey on 31 January 1771. (ADM 36/ 7374)

Mark Robinson believed that the small coasting vessels engaged in a great deal of smuggling, and he asked the Admiralty to buy a tender to examine creeks and islets (15 November 1767 ADM1/2388). He was put straight by the Merchants of South Carolina on the matter of intra-colony trade, after the Sardoine and Captain Hawker affair, and was asked not to stop interior trade. He seems to have heeded that advice, as there is no record that he seized any coasting vessels while he was in South Carolina.

On 29 April 1770 Sir William Draper embarked in the Fowey, to visit Governor Tryon at the Cape Fear. Mark Robinson on the Fowey is also stated as having arrived in Charles Town 8 October 1770, from Virginia and sailed for Virginia again on 29 January 1771. Whilst he was on this coast he had the satisfaction of preserving Charleston from the effects of an alarming conflagration, a service for which the Merchants of South Carolina expressed their gratitude by a public vote of thanks, dated 14 January 1771. He sailed from Charleston on the 22 (29) January 1771.

Fowey's captain on 1 January 1775 is listed as Cpt. George Montagu. The ship is noted as having received Lord Dunmore, the governor of the Colony of Virginia, when he fled the colony for safety after the Gunpowder Incident during the beginning of the American Revolution, marking the last departure of a Royal Governor from the colony, effectively ending British rule in Virginia. The National Park Service has identified it as a probable candidate for a wreck located off Yorktown, Virginia, in the York River.
