= Portrait of Lord Dunmore =

Painting by Joshua Reynolds

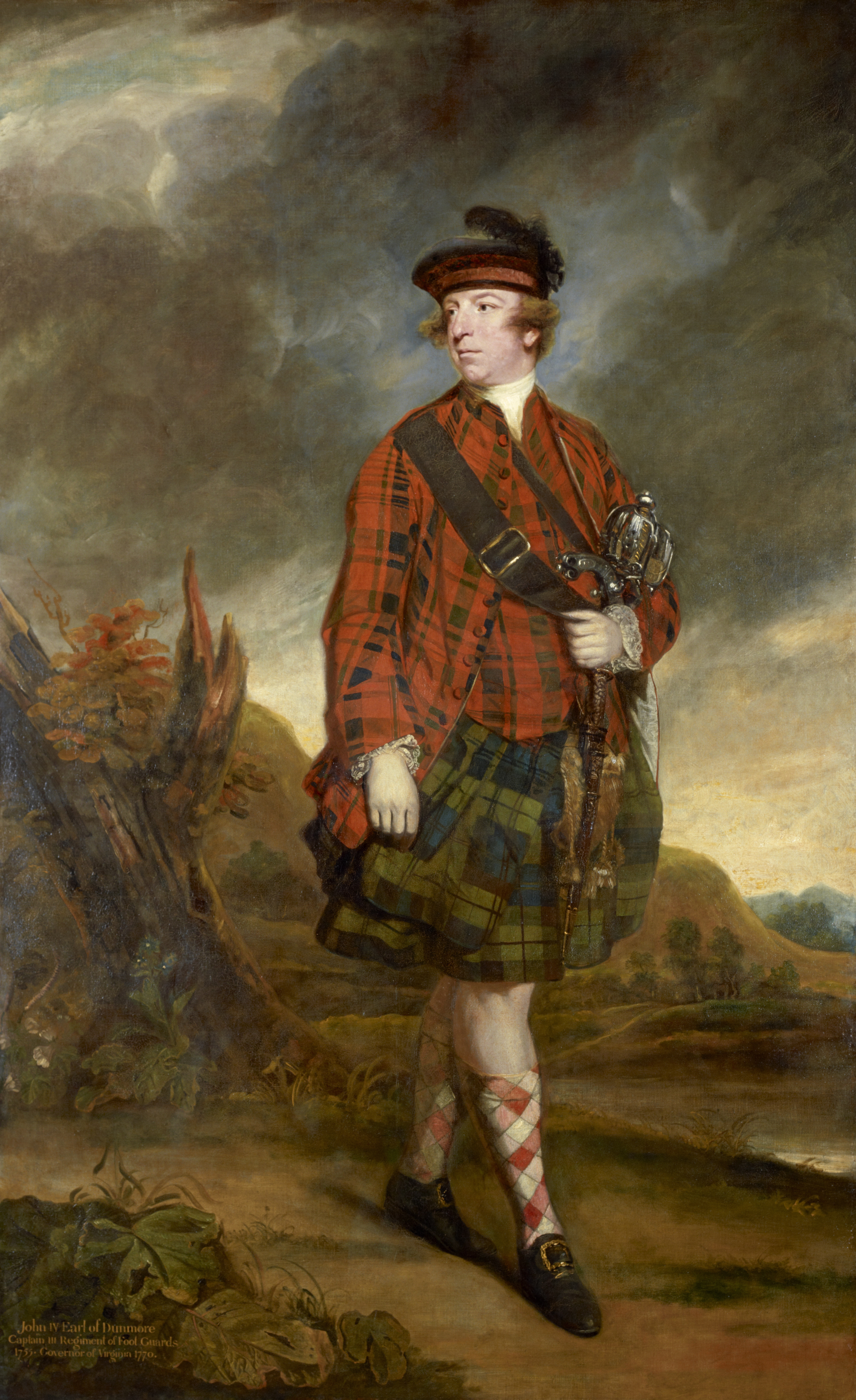
- Artist: Joshua Reynolds
- Year: 1765
- Type: Oil on canvas, portrait painting
- Dimensions: 238.1 cm × 146.2 cm (93.7 in × 57.6 in)
- Location: Scottish National Portrait Gallery; Edinburgh

Portrait of Lord Dunmore is a 1765 portrait painting by the British artist Joshua Reynolds. It depicts the Scottish aristocrat and soldier John Murray, 4th Earl of Dunmore, best known for his role as Governor of Virginia during Dunmore's War and the early stages of the American War of Independence. A former Jacobite, he served in the British Army during the Seven Years' War. As Governor of Virginia he issued Dunmore's Proclamation in 1775, encouraging escaped slaves to take up arms for the Loyalist cause.

Dunmore is shown at full-length as a Highland magnate, with a claymore and other weapons. Reynolds was a leading portraitist of Georgian Britain, who was elected the first President of the Royal Academy in 1769. The painting is today in the collection of the Scottish National Portrait Gallery in Edinburgh, having been acquired in 1992.

== Bibliography ==
- David, James Corbett. Dunmore's New World. University of Virginia Press, 2013.
- Frye, John. Hampton Roads and Four Centuries as a World's Seaport. Edwin Mellen Press, 2007.
- Postle, Edward (ed.) Joshua Reynolds: The Creation of Celebrity. Harry N. Abrams, 2005.
