= John Murray, 4th Earl of Dunmore =

British Army officer and colonial administrator (1730–1809)

The Right Honourable The Earl of Dunmore PC
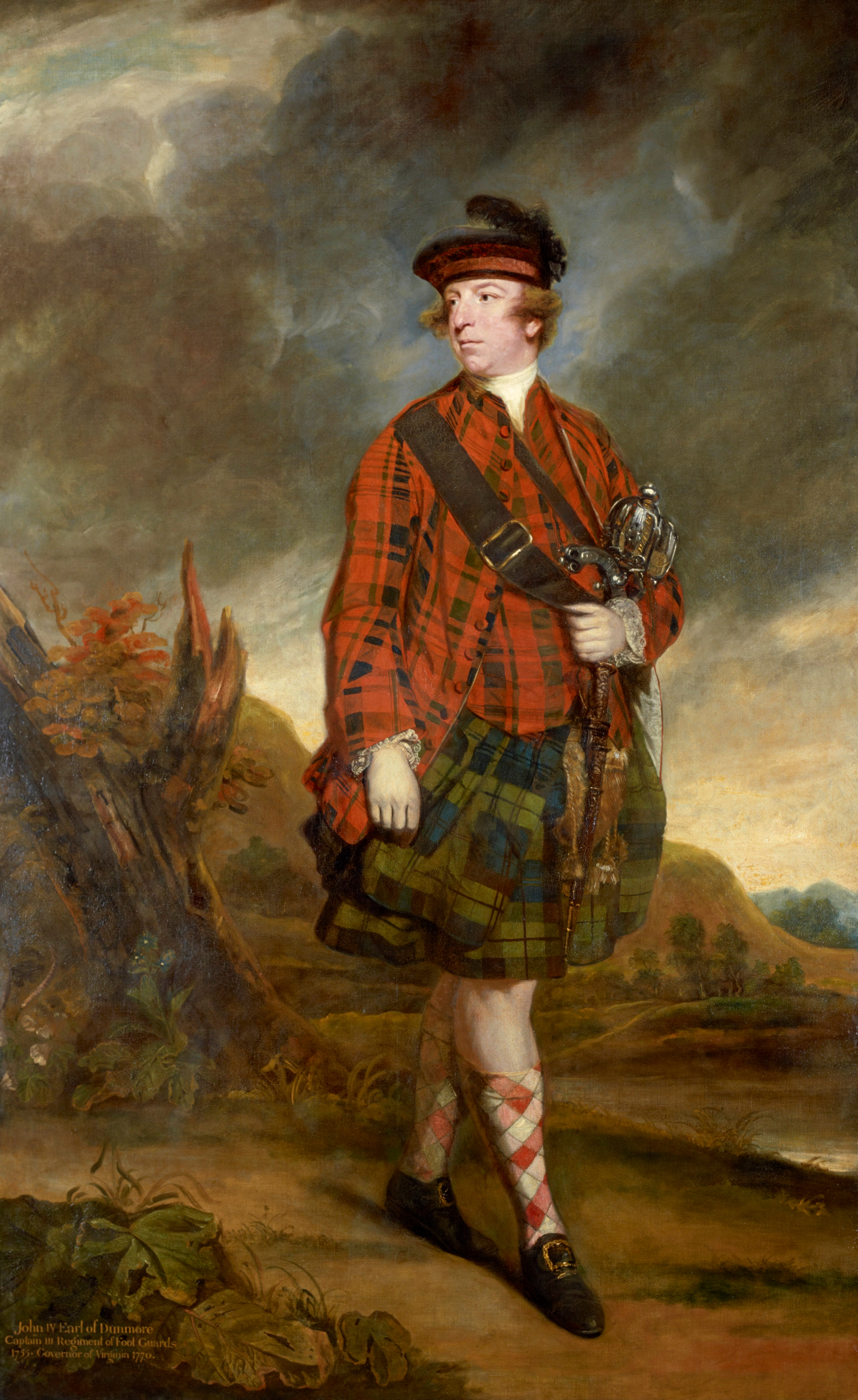
- Portrait of Lord Dunmore by Sir Joshua Reynolds, 1765

Governor of New York
- In office 1770–1771
- Monarch: George III
- Preceded by: Sir Henry Moore
- Succeeded by: William Tryon

Governor of Virginia
- In office 1771–1776
- Monarch: George III
- Preceded by: William Nelson
- Succeeded by: Patrick Henry

Governor of the Bahamas
- In office 1787–1796
- Monarch: George III
- Preceded by: James Edward Powell
- Succeeded by: John Forbes

Personal details
- Born: 1730 Taymouth, Fearnan, Scotland
- Died: 25 February 1809 (aged 78–79) Ramsgate, Kent, England
- Resting place: St Laurence's Church, Ramsgate

John Murray, 4th Earl of Dunmore (1730 – 25 February 1809) was a British Army officer and colonial administrator who served as the governor of Virginia from 1771 to 1776. Dunmore was named governor of New York in 1770. He succeeded to the same position in the colony of Virginia the following year after the death of Norborne Berkeley, 4th Baron Botetourt. As Virginia's governor, Dunmore directed a series of campaigns against the trans-Appalachian Indians, known as Lord Dunmore's War. He is noted for issuing a 1775 document, Dunmore's Proclamation, offering freedom to slaves who fought for the British Crown against Patriot rebels in Virginia. Dunmore fled to New York after the burning of Norfolk in 1776 and later returned to Britain. He was Governor of the Bahamas from 1787 to 1796.

== Early life ==
Murray was born in Taymouth, Scotland, the eldest son of William Murray, 3rd Earl of Dunmore, by his marriage to Catherine Nairne; he was a nephew of John Murray, 2nd Earl of Dunmore. In 1745, both Murray, then only 15, and his father joined the ill-fated Rising of "Bonnie Prince Charlie" (Charles Edward Stuart). The young Murray was appointed as a page to Prince Charles. The second Earl, his uncle, remained loyal to the Hanoverians.

After the Jacobite Army was defeated at the Battle of Culloden in 1746, William Murray was imprisoned in the Tower of London, and his family was put under house arrest. By 1750, William Murray had received a conditional pardon. John Murray was now aged twenty and joined the British Army. He served as a captain in the Seven Years' War, leading raids on the coast of France until resigning his commission around 1760.

In 1756, after the deaths of his uncle and father, he became the fourth Earl of Dunmore. In 1759, Dunmore married Lady Charlotte Stewart (1740 – 11 November 1818), a daughter of Alexander Stewart, 6th Earl of Galloway. They had five sons and three daughters:

- Lady Catherine Murray (23 January 1760 – 7 July 1783) married the Hon. Edward Bouverie, son of William de Bouverie, 1st Earl of Radnor. They had no issue.
- Lady Augusta Murray (27 January 1761 – 5 March 1830) in 1793 secretly married Prince Augustus Frederick, Duke of Sussex, son of King George III. Under the Royal Marriages Act 1772, the marriage was void, and the children were illegitimate – Sir Augustus d'Este and Augusta d'Este (later Baroness Truro).
- George Murray, 5th Earl of Dunmore (30 April 1762 – 11 November 1836)
- Hon. William Murray (22 August 1763 – 27 May 1773)
- Lt.-Col. Hon. Alexander Murray (12 October 1764 – July 1842). He married Deborah Hunt, daughter of Robert Hunt, Governor of the Bahamas. They had three sons and two daughters.
- Hon. John Murray (25 February 1766 – 14 December 1824). Unmarried.
- Lady Susan Murray (17 June 1767 – April 1826). She married, firstly, John Tharp, heir to a Jamaica sugar fortune. Secondly, she married John Drew, son of the Chichester banker John Drew; and lastly, a clergyman in Ireland, the Reverend Archibald Edward Douglas. She had children by each, including John Tharp, who married Lady Hannah Charlotte Hay, daughter of George Hay, 7th Marquess of Tweeddale.
- Hon. Leveson Granville Keith Murray (16 December 1770 – 4 January 1835). He married three times, the first of which was Wemyss Dalrymple, daughter of Sir William Dalrymple of Cousland, 3rd Baronet, and together they had a daughter, Jane. Secondly, Anne, by whom he had two sons and a daughter. His last wife was Louisa Mitty Abraham.

== Colonial governor of New York ==
The British appointed Dunmore governor of the Province of New York in 1770, but soon after his appointment, Virginia's governor, Norborne Berkeley, 4th Baron Botetourt (Lord Botetourt), died, and Dunmore replaced him. William Tryon, the governor of the Province of North Carolina, was correspondingly transferred to replace Dunmore in New York. Dunmore, who had already well-established himself in New York and owned over 50,000 acres of land in the colony, was unhappy to lose the lucrative post, complaining "I asked for New York—New York I took, and they have robbed me of it without my Consent." Two places in present-day Vermont, which was delineated from the New York and New Hampshire grants, took his name, and one retains it: Waterford was formed from "Dunmore" (which also included parts of today's St. Johnsbury and Concord) in Caledonia County, and there is still Lake Dunmore in Addison County.

== Colonial governor of Virginia ==
=== Lord Dunmore's War ===
Dunmore arrived in Williamsburg to take up the post of royal governor of the Colony of Virginia on 25 September 1771. Despite growing issues with Great Britain, his predecessor, Lord Botetourt, had been a popular governor, even though he served only two years. Integrating himself into Virginia's slavocracy, Dunmore purchased two slave plantations in the colony, owning almost 100 slaves. As Virginia's colonial governor, Dunmore directed a series of campaigns against the Indians known as Lord Dunmore's War. The Shawnee were the main target of these attacks. He aimed to strengthen Virginia's claims in the west, particularly in the Ohio Country. However, as a byproduct, it was known he would increase his power base. Some even accused Dunmore of colluding with the Shawnees and arranging the war to deplete the Virginia militia and help safeguard the Loyalist cause, should there be a colonial rebellion. Dunmore, in his history of the Indian Wars, denied these accusations.

=== Battle for control ===
Lacking diplomatic skills, Dunmore tried to govern without consulting the House of Burgesses of the Colonial Assembly for more than a year, which exacerbated an already tense situation. Richard Henry Lee would later write of the deeply unpopular governor that, if British administrators had "searched through the world for a person the best fitted to ruin their cause and procure union and success for these Colonies, they could not have found a more complete Agent than Lord Dunmore."

When Dunmore finally convened the Colonial Assembly in March 1773, which was the only way he could deal with fiscal issues to finance his war through additional taxation, the burgesses instead first resolved to form a committee of correspondence to communicate their continued concerns about the Townshend Acts and Gaspee Affair to Great Britain. Dunmore immediately postponed the Assembly. Many burgesses gathered a short distance away at the Raleigh Tavern and continued discussing their problems with the new taxes, perceived corruption, and lack of representation in England. When Dunmore reconvened the Assembly in 1774, the burgesses passed a resolution declaring 1 June 1774 a day of fasting and prayer in Virginia. In response, Dunmore dissolved the House.

The burgesses again reconvened as the Second Virginia Convention and elected delegates to the Continental Congress. Dunmore issued a proclamation against electing delegates to the Congress but failed to take serious action. In March 1775, Patrick Henry's "Give me Liberty or give me Death!" speech delivered at St. John's Episcopal Church in Richmond helped convince delegates to approve a resolution calling for armed resistance.

In the face of rising unrest in the colony, Dunmore sought to deprive Virginia's militia of military supplies. Dunmore gave the key to the Williamsburg magazine to Lieutenant Henry Colins, commander of HMS Magdalen, and ordered him to remove the powder, provoking what became known as the Gunpowder Incident. On the night of 20 April 1775, royal marines loaded fifteen half-barrels of powder into the governor's wagon, intent on transporting it down the Quarterpath Road to the James River and the British warship. Local militia rallied, and word of the incident spread across the colony.

=== Confrontation with the Hanover militia ===
The Hanover militia, led by Patrick Henry, arrived outside Williamsburg on 3 May. That same day, Dunmore evacuated his family from the Governor's Palace to his hunting lodge, Porto Bello, in nearby York County. On 6 May, Dunmore issued a proclamation against "a certain Patrick Henry ... and a Number of deluded Followers" who had organised "an Independent Company ... and put themselves in a Posture of War."

Dunmore threatened to impose martial law and eventually retreated to Porto Bello to join his family. Dislodged by the Virginia rebels and wounded in the leg, on 8 June, Dunmore took refuge on the British warship HMS Fowey in the York River. Over the following months, Dunmore sent many raiding parties to plunder plantations along the James, York, and Potomac rivers, particularly those owned by rebels. The British raiding parties exacerbated tensions by plundering Patriot supplies and encouraging their slaves to rebel. In December, George Washington, who had been installed only months before as commander in chief of the Continental Army, commented, "I do not think that forcing his lordship on shipboard is sufficient. Nothing less than depriving him of life or liberty will secure peace to Virginia, as motives of resentment actuate his conduct to a degree equal to the total destruction of that colony."

=== Dunmore's Proclamation ===
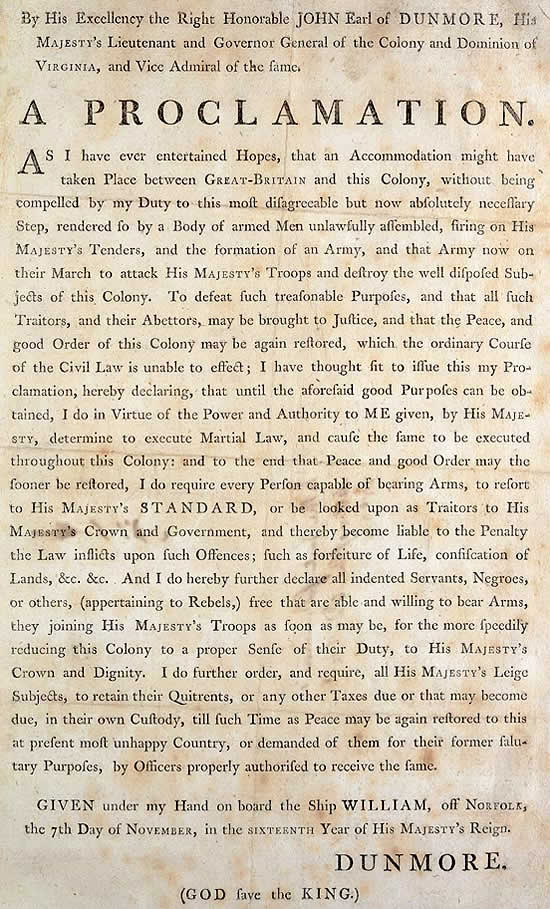
A copy of Dunmore's Proclamation

Dunmore is noted for Dunmore's Proclamation, also known as Lord Dunmore's Offer of Emancipation. Dated 7 November 1775 but proclaimed a week later, Dunmore thereby formally offered freedom to slaves who abandoned their Patriot masters to join the British. The proclamation appeared to respond to the legislature's proclamation that Dunmore had resigned his position by boarding a Royal Navy warship off Yorktown nearly six months earlier. However, by the end of the war, an estimated 800 to 2000 formerly enslaved people sought refuge with the British; some served in a military role, though the majority served in noncombatant roles.

Dunmore organized these Black Loyalists into the Ethiopian Regiment. However, despite winning the Battle of Kemp's Landing on 17 November 1775, Dunmore lost decisively at the Battle of Great Bridge on 9 December 1775. Following that defeat, Dunmore loaded his troops and many Virginia Loyalists onto Royal Navy ships waiting offshore. Smallpox spread in the confined quarters, and some 500 of the 800 members of the Ethiopian Regiment died.

=== Final skirmishes and return to Britain ===
On New Year's Day in 1776, Dunmore gave orders to burn waterfront buildings in Norfolk from which patriot troops were firing on his ships. However, the fire spread. The city burned, and with it, any hope that Dunmore's loyalists could return to Virginia. Dunmore retreated to New York. Some ships of his refugee fleet were sent south, mainly to Florida. Esek Hopkins, the new commander of the American navy, was given orders in early January 1776 to pursue Dunmore, who the Virginians viewed as a pirate, but Hopkins selected the Bahamas as a better target. When Dunmore realized he could not regain control in Virginia, he returned to Britain in July 1776. Dunmore continued to draw his pay as the colony's governor until 1783, when Britain recognized American independence.

== Colonial governor of the Bahamas ==
From 1787 to 1796, Dunmore served as governor of the Bahamas. During his tenure as governor, the British issued land grants to American Loyalists who went into exile. The sparse population of the Bahamas tripled within a few years. The Loyalists developed cotton as a commodity crop, but it dwindled from insect damage and soil exhaustion. In addition to the slaves they brought with them, the Loyalist planters' descendants imported more enslaved people from Africa for labour.

== Peerage ==
Dunmore sat as a Scottish representative peer in the House of Lords from 1761 to 1774 and from 1776 to 1790.

== Death ==
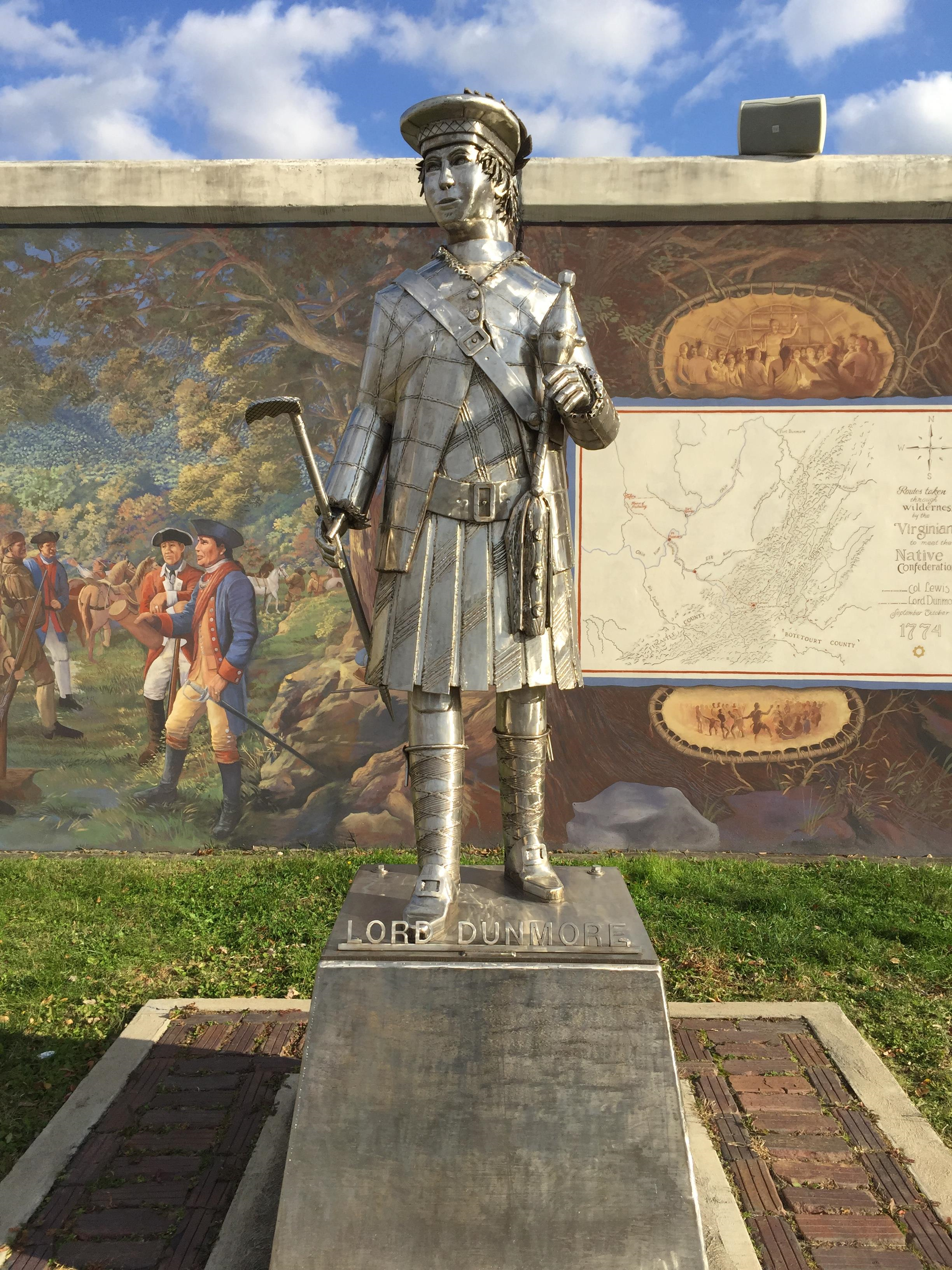
Statue of Dunmore at Point Pleasant

Dunmore died on 25 February 1809 in Ramsgate in Kent. He was succeeded in the earldom by his eldest son, George. The Countess of Dunmore died in 1819.

== Legacy ==
- Dunmore County, Virginia, formed in 1772, was named in his honour. However, during the American Revolutionary War, the citizens changed its name to Shenandoah County in 1778.
- Lake Dunmore in Salisbury, Vermont, was named after him in 1773 since he had claimed ownership of the area while he was Governor of New York.
- Porto Bello, the hunting lodge of Lord Dunmore, still stands on the grounds of Camp Peary in York County, Virginia. It is listed on the National Register of Historic Places. Access to the base is highly restricted, so the structure is not available for public viewing.
- The Dunmore Pineapple was built in 1761 before he left Scotland. The building is now owned by the National Trust for Scotland and is leased to the Landmark Trust who use it to provide holiday accommodation. The gardens are open to the public year-round.
- Dunmore Street in Norfolk, Virginia, was named for him. It is said that the naming of Dunmore Street was not to honour the ex-governor but to celebrate the place in Norfolk where he had last set foot.
- The borough of Dunmore in Lackawanna County, Pennsylvania, is named after Dunmore Park in Scotland, the location of the Dunmore Pineapple.
- Lord Dunmore Drive in Virginia Beach, Virginia.
- Dunmore Town, Harbour Island, North Eleuthera, Bahamas.

Government offices
Preceded by Sir Henry Moore, Bt	Governor of the Province of New York; 1770–1771	Succeeded by William Tryon
Preceded by William Nelson	Governor of the Province of Virginia; 1771–1776	Succeeded by Patrick Henry as Governor of Virginia
Preceded by John Brown	Governor of the Bahamas; 1787–1796	Succeeded by Robert Hunt
Peerage of Scotland
Preceded by William Murray	Earl of Dunmore; 1756–1809	Succeeded by George Murray
