= Gunpowder Incident =

1775 conflict of the American Revolutionary War

Coordinates: 37°16′14.66″N 76°41′59.98″W

- Part of the American Revolutionary War
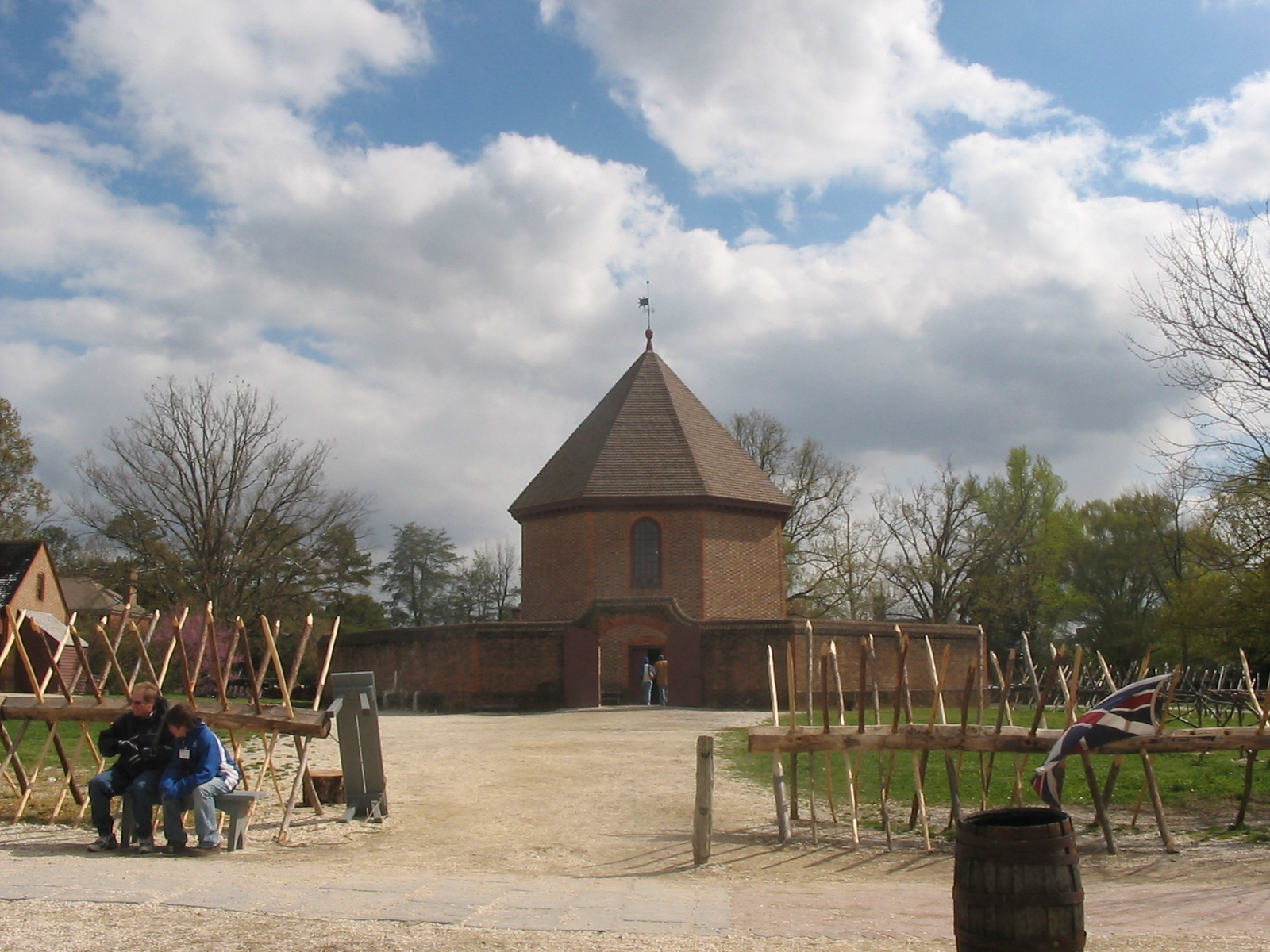
- The powder magazine in Williamsburg from which the gunpowder was removed
Date	April 21, 1775
Location	Williamsburg, Virginia
Result	British sailors remove military supplies Militia uprising peacefully resolved

The Gunpowder Incident (or Powder Alarm or Gunpowder Affair) was a conflict early in the American Revolutionary War between Lord Dunmore, the Royal Governor of the Colony of Virginia, and militia led by Patrick Henry. On April 21, 1775, two days after the Battles of Lexington and Concord (and well before news of those events reached Virginia), Lord Dunmore ordered the removal of the gunpowder from the magazine in Williamsburg, Virginia, to a Royal Navy ship.

This action sparked local unrest, and militia companies began mustering throughout the colony. Henry led a small militia force toward Williamsburg to force return of the gunpowder to the colony's control. The matter was resolved without conflict when a payment of £330 was made to Henry. Dunmore, fearing for his personal safety, later retreated to a naval vessel, ending royal control of the colony.

== Background ==
Military tensions began to rise in the British colonies of North America in 1774 when a series of legislative acts by the British Parliament known as the Intolerable Acts began to be implemented in the colonies. The colonies, in solidarity with the Province of Massachusetts Bay—which had been singled out for punishment by those acts in the wake of the Boston Tea Party—had organized a Congress to meet in September 1774. During the meeting of the First Continental Congress, word arrived of a militia uprising in Massachusetts that became known as the Powder Alarm. In early September, General Thomas Gage, the royal governor of Massachusetts, had removed gunpowder from a powder magazine in Charlestown (in a location now in Somerville), and militia from all over New England had flocked to the area in response to false rumors that violence had been involved. One consequence of this action was that the Congress called for the colonies to organize militia companies for their defense. Another was that Lord Dartmouth, the Secretary of State for the Colonies, advised the colonial governors to secure their military supplies and prohibited importation of further supplies of powder.

In early 1775, Virginians began to organize militia companies and seek out military supplies (weapons, ammunition, and gunpowder) to arm and equip them. Lord Dunmore, Virginia's royal governor, saw this rising unrest in his colony and sought to deprive Virginia militia of these supplies. It was not until after Patrick Henry's "Give me liberty or give me death!" speech at the Second Virginia Convention on March 23 that Dunmore "[thought] it prudent to remove some Gunpowder which was in a Magazine in this place." Although British Army troops had been withdrawn from Virginia in the wake of the Powder Alarm, there were several Royal Navy ships in the Virginia waters of Chesapeake Bay. On April 19, Lord Dunmore quietly brought a company of British sailors into Williamsburg and quartered them in the governor's mansion. Dunmore then ordered Captain Henry Collins, commander of HMS Magdalen, to remove the gunpowder from the magazine in Williamsburg.

== Removing the gunpowder ==
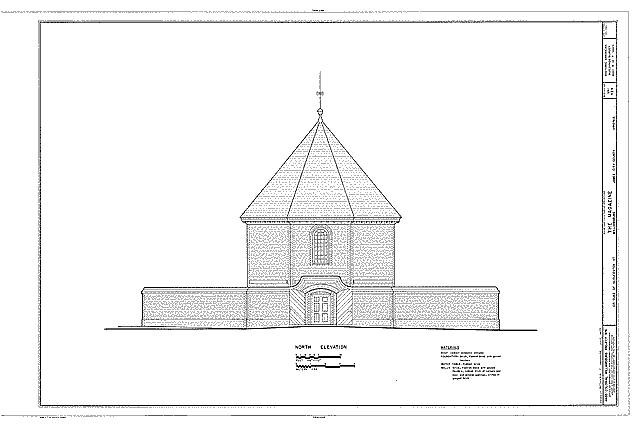
Drawing of the octagonal Williamsburg Magazine

On the early morning of April 21, 1775, Royal Navy sailors went to the Williamsburg powder magazine, loaded 15 half-barrels of powder into the governor's wagon, and transported it to the eastern end of the Quarterpath Road to be loaded aboard the Magdalen in the James River. The act was discovered by townsfolk while underway, and they sounded an alarm. Local militia rallied to the scene, and riders spread word of the incident across the colony. Dunmore had as a precaution armed his servants with muskets, and it was only the calming words of Patriot leaders, including the Speaker of the House of Burgesses, Peyton Randolph, that prevented the assembling crowd from storming Dunmore's mansion. The city council demanded the return of the powder, claiming it was the property of the colony and not the Crown. Dunmore demurred, stating that he was moving the powder as protection against its seizure during a rumored slave uprising, and would eventually return it. This seemed to satisfy the assembled crowd, and it dispersed peacefully.

Unrest however persisted in Williamsburg and spread throughout the countryside. After a second crowd was convinced to disperse by Patriot leaders, Dunmore reacted angrily, warning on April 22 that if attacked, he would "declare Freedom to the Slaves, and reduce the City of Williamsburg to Ashes." He also told a Williamsburg alderman that he had "once fought for the Virginians" but "By God, I would let them see that I could fight against them."

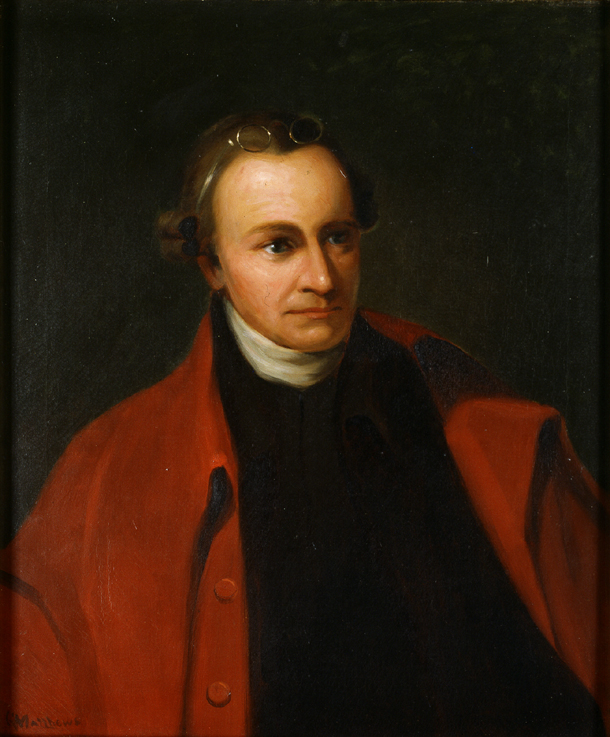
Patrick Henry, portrait by George Bagby Matthews c. 1891 after an original by Thomas Sully

By April 29, militia mobilizing in the countryside had learned of the battles at Lexington and Concord. Nearly 700 men mustered at Fredericksburg and decided to send a messenger to Williamsburg to assess the situation before marching on the capital. Randolph advised against violence, and George Washington, a longtime leader of the Virginia militia, concurred. In response to their advice, the Fredericksburg militia voted by a narrow margin not to march. However, militia from other parts of the colony did march to Williamsburg. The Hanover County militia, led by Henry, voted on May 2 to march on Williamsburg. Henry dispatched a small company to the home of Richard Corbin, who was the deputy collector of the royal revenue in Virginia, in a bid to force him to pay for the powder from Crown revenue in his possession; the remainder of the Hanover County militia, numbering about 150, marched toward Williamsburg, arriving about 15 miles (24 km) away on May 3. That day Dunmore's family escaped Williamsburg to Porto Bello, Lord Dunmore's hunting lodge on the York River, and from there to HMS Fowey, lying at anchor in the York River.

Corbin was not at home—he was in Williamsburg, meeting with Dunmore. Henry was advised by Carter Braxton, Corbin's son-in-law and a Patriot member of the House of Burgesses, not to enter the city, while Braxton rode into the city and negotiated a payment. The next day, May 4, Henry received a bill of exchange for £330 (equivalent to £46,091 in 2025) signed by a wealthy plantation owner, as payment for the powder (he refused the offer of payment from Crown accounts). Henry then departed to take his place as a member of Virginia's delegation to the Second Continental Congress, promising to deliver the money to "the Virginia Delegates at the General congress". On May 6 Dunmore issued a proclamation charging Henry with extortion of the £330 and forbidding the citizenry to assist Henry in any way. Henry was offered protection by several counties and was escorted by several companies of militia to the Maryland border as he made his way to Philadelphia.

== Aftermath ==
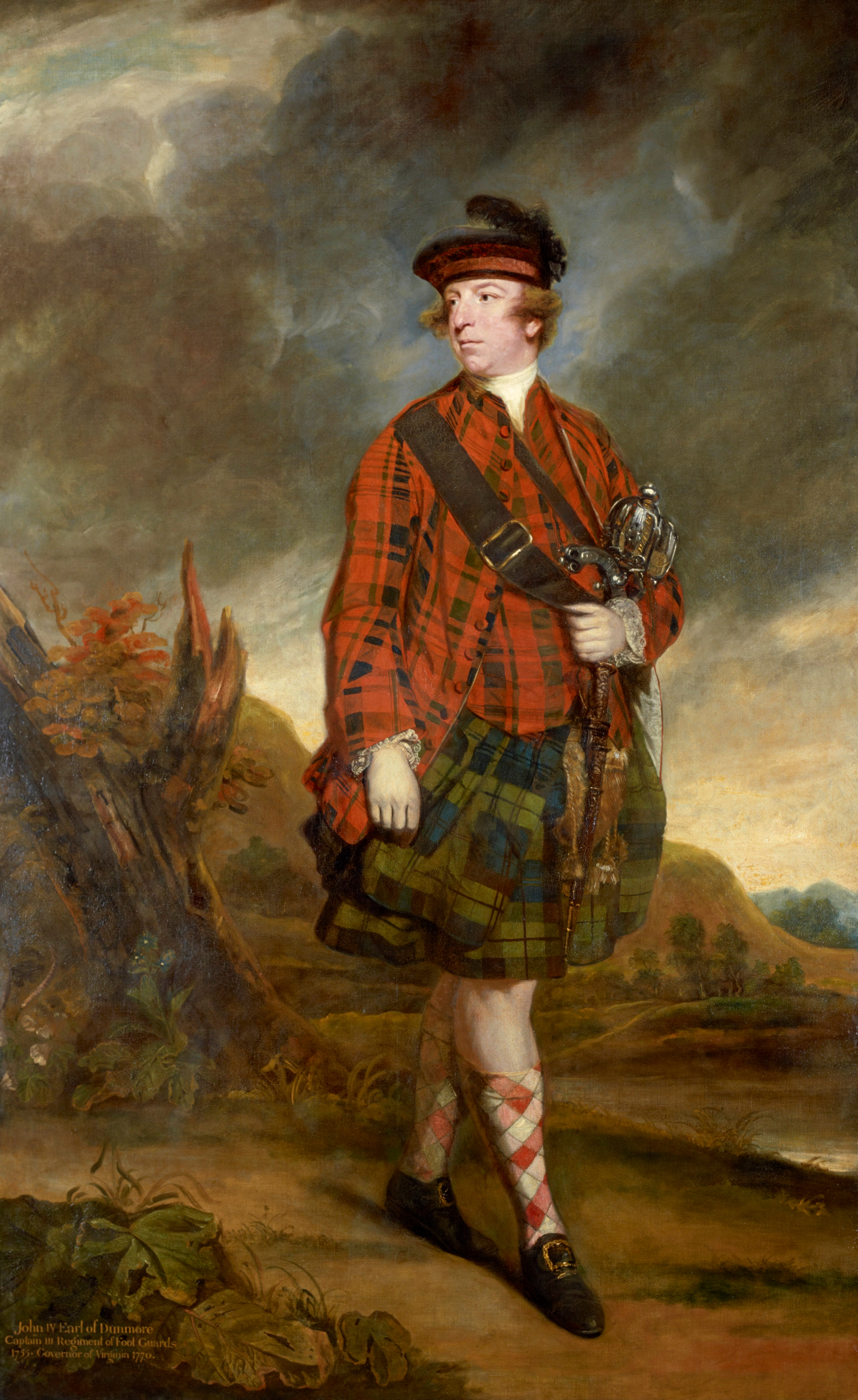
Portrait of Lord Dunmore by Sir Joshua Reynolds, 1765

The incident burnished Henry's reputation while worsening Dunmore's popularity. Although his family briefly returned to Williamsburg on May 12 as a sign of good faith, relations between Dunmore and the House of Burgesses continued to deteriorate. During the night of June 3 or early morning of June 4, 1775, a spring-gun set by the British to protect the military stores in the magazine in Williamsburg wounded two young men who had broken in. The subsequent outrage by the local population proved to be the final act of the Gunpowder Incident, leading Governor Dunmore to flee the city to a British warship and declare the Commonwealth of Virginia in a state of rebellion. On June 8, Dunmore and his family fled the Governor's Palace in the middle of the night and took up residence aboard the Fowey. The Burgesses had been deliberating the Conciliatory Resolution, a proposal that was an attempt by the North Ministry to divide the colonies. In the wake of Dunmore's flight, the Burgesses rejected the proposal.

Dunmore continued to make vigorous attempts to regain control of the colony, but after a decisive defeat of British forces at Great Bridge in December, he was reduced to raiding operations and eventually abandoned the colony for good in August 1776. Virginia's government was first taken over by a Committee of Safety, chosen by the Third Virginia Convention in July 1775; Henry became the independent state's first governor in July 1776.
