= Ancient Egyptian race controversy =

Question of the race of ancient Egyptians

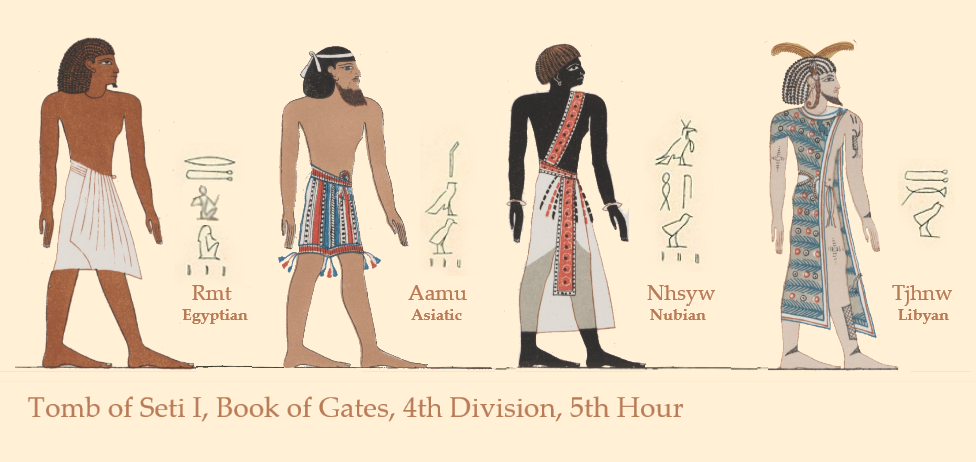
Illustration from the Book of Gates depicting four ethnic groups being led by the god Horus (not pictured) into the afterworld based on a wall painting in the tomb of Seti I, a pharaoh of the 19th dynasty. From left to right: an Egyptian, an Asiatic, a Nubian, and a Libyan. It is based on an illustration from Richard Lepsius (1849–1856). In the tomb each group is repeated four times for a total of sixteen figures. The representation of ethnic groups in Egyptian iconography has been a source of dispute among scholars.

The question of the race of the people of ancient Egypt was raised historically as a product of the early racial concepts of the 18th and 19th centuries, and was linked to models of racial hierarchy primarily based on craniometry and anthropometry. A variety of views circulated about the racial identity of the Egyptians and the source of their culture.

Some scholars argued that ancient Egyptian culture was influenced by other Afroasiatic-speaking populations in North Africa, the Horn of Africa, or West Asia, while others pointed to influences from various Nubian groups or populations in Europe. In more recent times, some writers continued to challenge the mainstream view, some focusing on questioning the race of specific notable individuals, such as the pharaoh represented in the Great Sphinx of Giza, the native Egyptian pharaoh Tutankhamun, the Egyptian queen Tiye, and the Greek Ptolemaic queen Cleopatra VII.

Mainstream Western scholars reject the notion that Egypt was a "white" or "black" civilization; They maintain that applying modern notions of black or white races to ancient Egypt is anachronistic. In addition, scholars reject the notion—implicit in a black or white Egypt hypothesis—that ancient Egypt was racially homogeneous; instead, skin colour varied between the peoples of Lower Egypt, Upper Egypt, and Nubia, who rose to power in various eras of ancient Egypt. Within Egyptian history, despite multiple foreign invasions, the demographics were not shifted substantially by large migrations. Other scholars have suggested there may have been a gradual period of demographic change from Syria via the eastern Delta region.

International scholarship reflected in the General History of Africa, a multi-volume historical project of UNESCO, have expressed a comparable position. A majority of the scholars that contributed to the Volume II edition (1981) considered Egypt an indigenous African civilisation with a mixed population that originated largely in the Sahara and featured a variety of skin colours from north and south of the Saharan region. In the view of Egyptian scholar and featured editor Gamal Mokhtar, Upper Egypt and Nubia held "similar ethnic composition" with comparable material cultures. An updated Volume IX publication launched in 2025 maintained that Egypt had both African and Eurasian populations. The review section which focused on the 1974 "Peopling of Egypt" symposium stated that accumulated research over three decades had confirmed the migration from Southernly African along with Saharan populations into the early Nile Valley. Upper Egypt was now positioned as a origin point of pharaonic unification, with supporting archaeological, anthropological, genetic, and linguistic sources of evidence having identified close affinities between Upper Egypt and other sub-Saharan African populations.

== Background ==
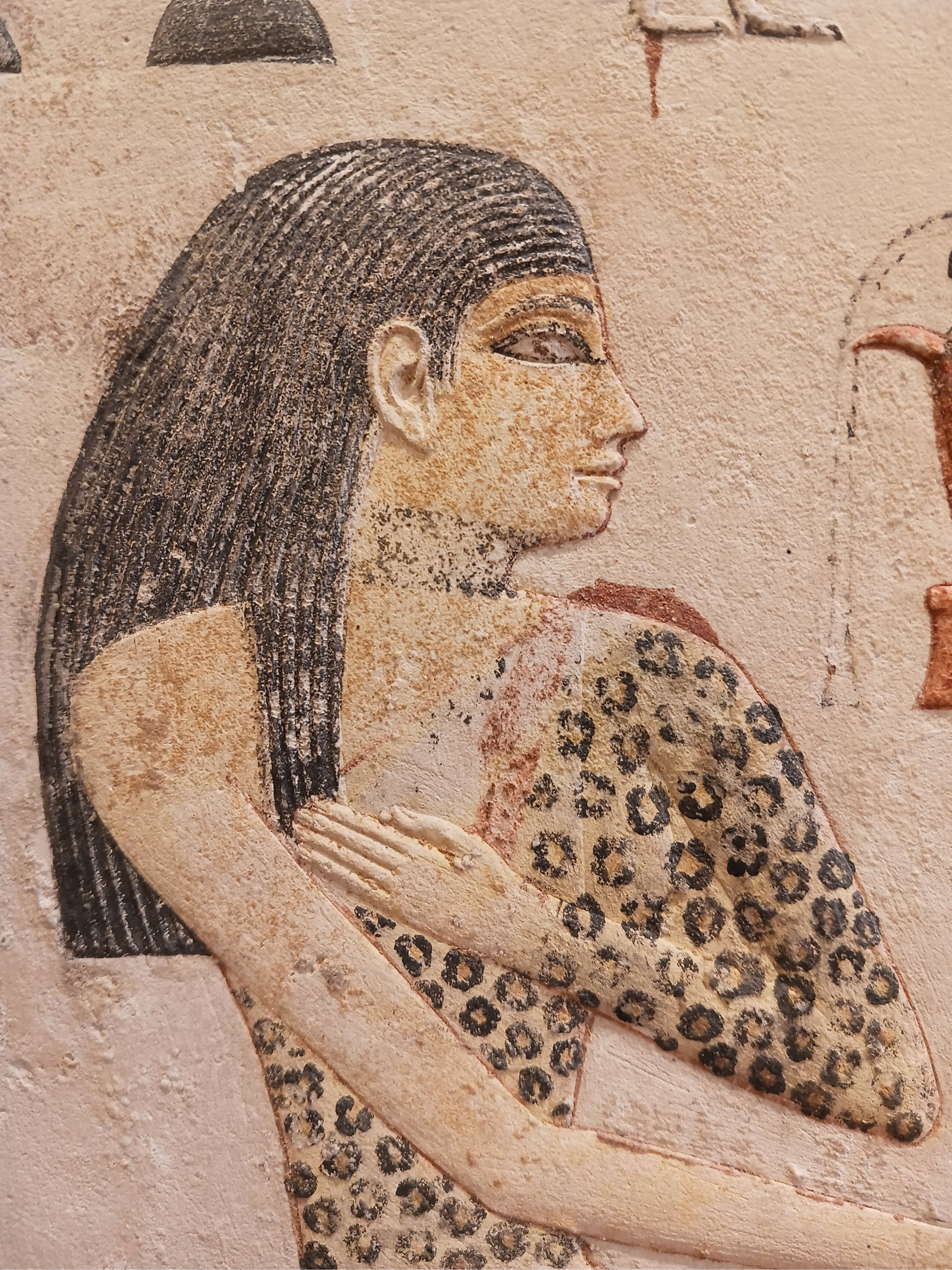
Princess Nefertiabet, likely daughter of king Sneferu, sister of king Khufu ("Cheops"), ca. 2589-2566 BCE. The original colors of the stele were well preserved to this day, including her skin color. Louvre Museum

In the 18th century, French philosopher and abolitionist Constantin François de Chassebœuf, comte de Volney, wrote that "the Copts are the proper representatives of the Ancient Egyptians due to their jaundiced and fumed skin, which is neither Greek nor Arab, their full faces, their puffy eyes, their crushed noses, and their thick lips...the ancient Egyptians were true Negroes of the same type as all native born Africans". Volney also said that the Sphinx gave him the key to the riddle as to why all the Egyptians he saw across the country "have a bloated face, puffed-up eyes, flat nose, thick lips – in a word, the true face of the mulatto." He wrote he was tempted to attribute it to the climate, but upon visiting the Sphinx, its appearance gave him the answer; "seeing that head, typically negro in all its features", Volney saw it as the "true solution to the enigma (of how the modern Egyptians came to have their 'mulatto' appearance)". He goes on to postulate, "the Copts were "true negroes" of the same stock as all the autochthonous peoples of Africa" and they "after some centuries of mixing..., must have lost the full blackness of its original color." Jacques Joseph Champollion-Figeac criticized Volney and called his conclusion "evidently forced and inadmissible".

The leading French scientist of the 18th century, Georges Cuvier, considered the Egyptians to be Caucasian, and it was with Cuvier that Augustus Granville sided in the dissection and first scientific autopsy of an ancient Egyptian mummy in 1825. Another early example of the controversy is an article published in The New-England Magazine of October 1833, where the authors dispute a claim that "Herodotus was given as authority for their being negroes." They point out with reference to tomb paintings: "It may be observed that the complexion of the men is invariably red, that of the women yellow; but neither of them can be said to have anything in their physiognomy at all resembling the Negro countenance."

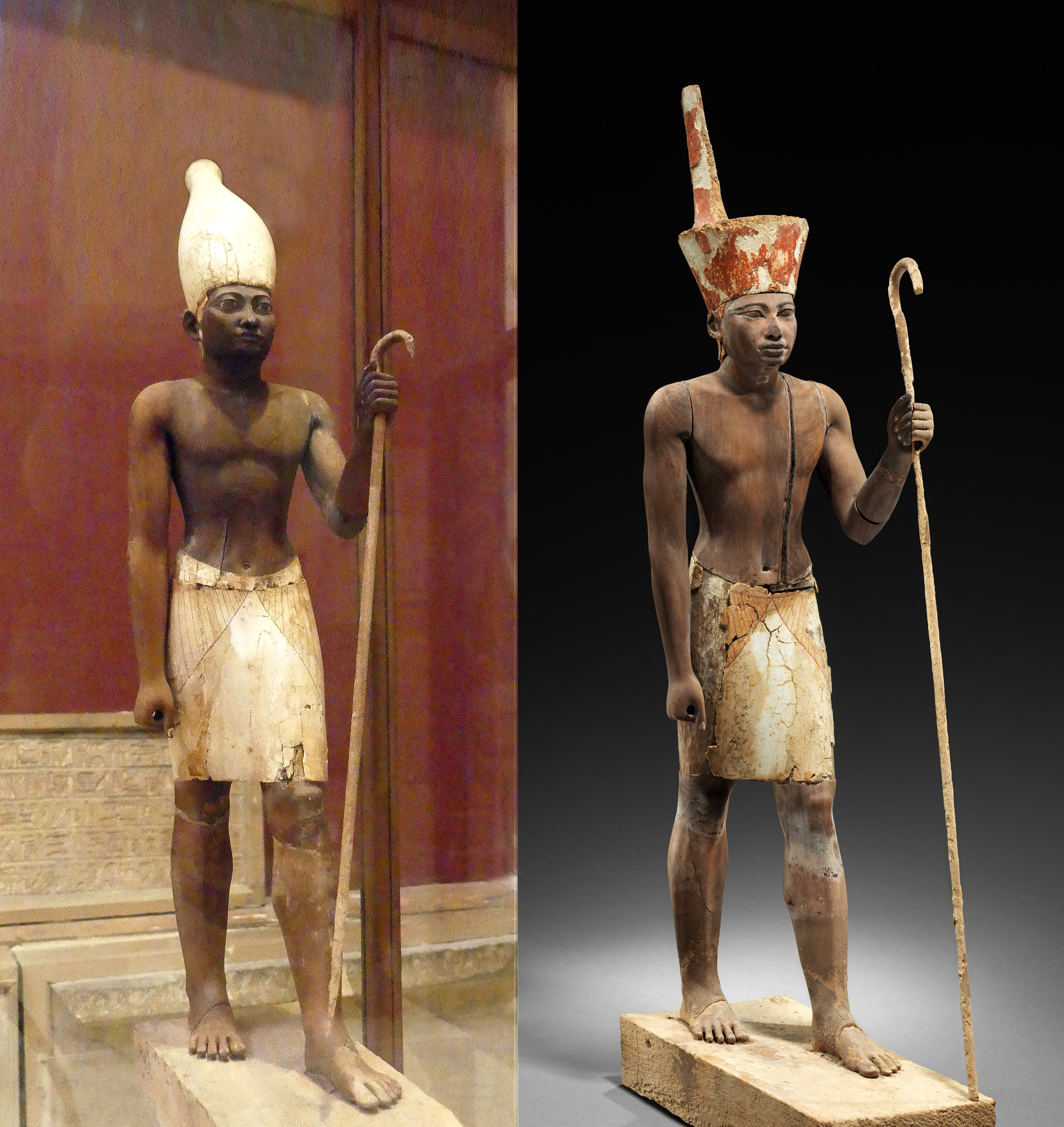
Pair of guardian statuettes, depicting Middle Kingdom pharaohs, presumably Senusret I or Amenemhat II, with the white crown of Upper Egypt (left), the other with the red crown of Lower Egypt. Wood, from el-Lisht, ca. 1919–1885 BCE, 12th dynasty, Middle Kingdom (Egyptian Museum, main floor, room 22, JE44951, and Metropolitan Museum of Art, 14.3.17). The 12th dynasty had origins in Ta-Seti, Upper Egypt.

In 1839, Jean-François Champollion suggested that: "In the Copts of Egypt, we do not find any of the characteristic features of the ancient Egyptian population. The Copts are the result of crossbreeding with all the nations that successfully dominated Egypt. It is wrong to seek in them the principal features of the old race."

This memoir was made in the context of the first tribes that would have inhabited Egypt, his opinion was noted after his return from Nubia. In 1839, Champollion's and Volney's claims were disputed by Jacques Joseph Champollion-Figeac, who blamed a misunderstanding of the ancients for spreading a false impression of a "Negro" Egypt, stating "the two physical traits of black skin and woolly hair are not enough to stamp a race as negro" and "the opinion that the ancient population of Egypt belonged to the Negro African race, is an error long accepted as the truth. ... Volney's conclusion as to the Negro origin of the ancient Egyptian civilization is evidently forced and inadmissible."

Gaston Maspero, a 19th-century French Egyptologist, stated that "by the almost unanimous testimony of ancient Greek historians, they (Ancient Egyptians) belonged to the African race, which settled in Ethiopia." Heinrich Karl Brusch, a 19th-century German Egyptologist stated that "according to ethnology, the Egyptians appear to form a third branch of the Caucasian race... and this much may be regarded as certain". E.A. Wallis Budge, a 19th-century British Egyptologist, argued that "There are many things in the manners and customs and religions of the historic Egyptians that suggest that the original home of their ancestors was in a country in the neighbourhood of Uganda and Land of Punt".

The debate over the race of the ancient Egyptians intensified during the 19th century movement to abolish slavery in the United States, as arguments relating to the justifications for slavery increasingly asserted the historical, mental and physical inferiority of black people. For example, in 1851, John Campbell directly challenged the claims by Champollion and others regarding the evidence for a black Egypt, asserting "There is one great difficulty, and to my mind an insurmountable one, which is that the advocates of the negro civilization of Egypt do not attempt to account for, how this civilization was lost.... Egypt progressed, and why, because it was Caucasian." The arguments regarding the race of the Egyptians became more explicitly tied to the debate over slavery in the United States, as tensions escalated towards the American Civil War.

In 1854, Josiah C. Nott with George Gliddon set out to prove "that the Caucasian or white, and the Negro races were distinct at a very remote date, and that the Egyptians were Caucasians." Samuel George Morton, a physician and professor of anatomy, concluded that "Negroes were numerous in Egypt, but their social position in ancient times was the same that it now is [in the United States], that of servants and slaves."

== 1974 UNESCO committee ==
At the UNESCO "Symposium on the Peopling of Ancient Egypt and the Deciphering of the Meroitic script" in Cairo in 1974, the "Black Hypothesis" and the notion of a homogeneous population in Egypt was proposed by Cheikh Anta Diop in his chapter Origins of the Ancient Egyptians. "Numerous objections were made to the ideas propounded by Diop. These objections revealed the extent of a disagreement which remained profound even though it was not voiced explicitly." The disagreement was largely due to methodological issues, for example, the insufficient data "to enable provisional conclusions to be drawn with regard to the peopling of ancient Egypt and the successive phases through which it may have passed".

The arguments for all sides are recorded in the UNESCO publication General History of Africa, with the "Origin of the Egyptians" chapter being written by Cheikh Anta Diop, a proponent of the "Black Hypothesis". Diop's chapter was credited in the general conclusion of the symposium report by the International Scientific Committee's Rapporteur, Jean Devisse, as a "painstakingly researched contribution", consequently there was a "real lack of balance" in the discussion among participants. At the 1974 UNESCO conference, several participants other than Diop and Obenga concluded that the Neolithic Egyptian population was indigenous to the Sahara, and was made up of people from north and south of the Sahara who had a range of skin colors. The majority of participants in the conference disagreed with Diop's and Obenga's views. Similarly, none of the participants voiced support for an earlier postulation that Egyptians were "white with a dark, even black, pigmentation", although Professor Ghallab stated that "the inhabitants of Egypt in Palaeolithic times were Caucasoids".

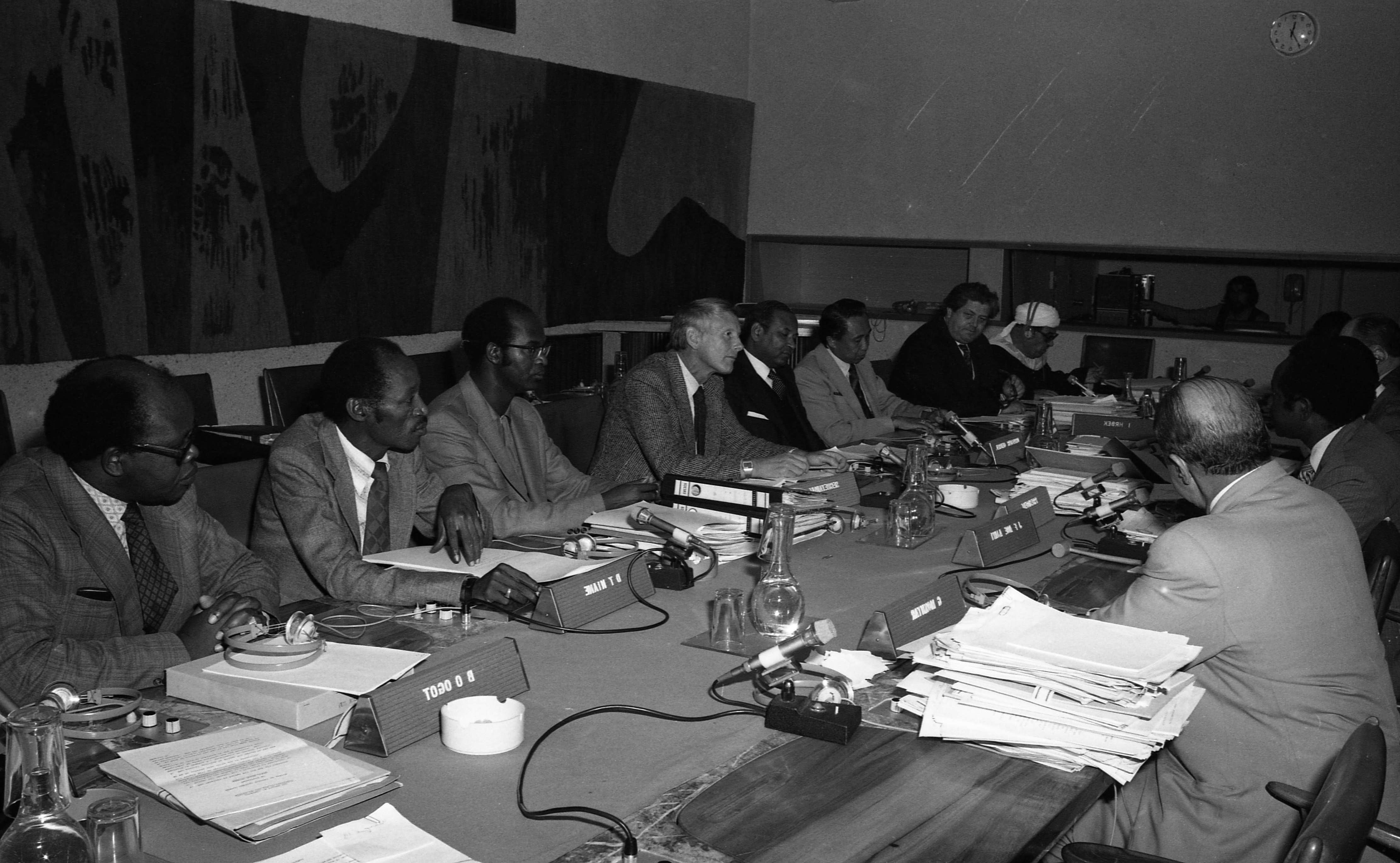
1977 Meeting for the General History of Africa

Subsequent reviewers of the 1974 symposium debate and the UNESCO publication have presented a range of views on the outcome of the debate. According to Larissa Nordholt, the majority of reviewers at the time saw Diop's chapter as discrediting the publication's scholarly reputation due to the suggested "weight on politics". Larissa Nordholt argued that Diop's chapter was politically motivated, having been published only due to being in line with UNESCO's political imperatives, despite clashing with accepted historical methods and standards of academic rigor. Peter Shinnie reviewing the GHA volume, wrote that "It seems that UNESCO and [the editor] Mokhtar were embarrassed by the unscholarly and preposterous nature of Diop's views but were unable to reject his contribution". However, Bethwell Allan Ogot, a Kenyan historian and editor of UNESCO General History of Africa Volume 5, stated that “Cheikh Anta Diop wrested Egyptian civilization from the Egyptologists and restored it to the mainstream of African history”. Stephen Quirke argued that the UNESCO-sponsored conference on the General History of Africa in 1974 "did not change the Eurocentric climate of research" and of the need to incorporate both African-centred studies and White European, academic perspectives. He later outlined that "research conferences and publications on the history and language of Kemet [Egypt] remain dominated, beyond 90%, by those brought up and trained in European, not African societies and languages (which include Arabic)".

== 2025 UNESCO multidisciplinary review ==
The key questions addressed in this rubric are not about the ‘ownership’ of ancient Egypt. It is instead about the inner dynamics of ancient Egyptian societies in their own terms. Egypt, located at the intersection of Africa and Eurasia, is African, with a fluctuating distribution of African and Eurasian populations depending on historical circumstances.

— Augustin Holl, Chair, UNESCO International Scientific Committee for Volume IX to XI of General History of Africa.

In 2025, members of the UNESCO International Scientific Committee for the Drafting of New Volumes IX, X and IX of General History of Africa reviewed the 1974 Symposium with the availability of new sources of data. This volume featured 60 scholars from 28 countries across every continent, with the International Scientific Committee consisting of 16 member specialists appointed by the UNESCO Director-General, Audrey Azoulay. These committee members included Catherine Coquery-Vidrovitch, Paul Lovejoy, Tayeb Chenntouf, Anshan Li, Hilary Beckles and Vanicléia Silva Santos. The international publication featured multidisciplinary views across several chapter sections on the population formation of Egypt.

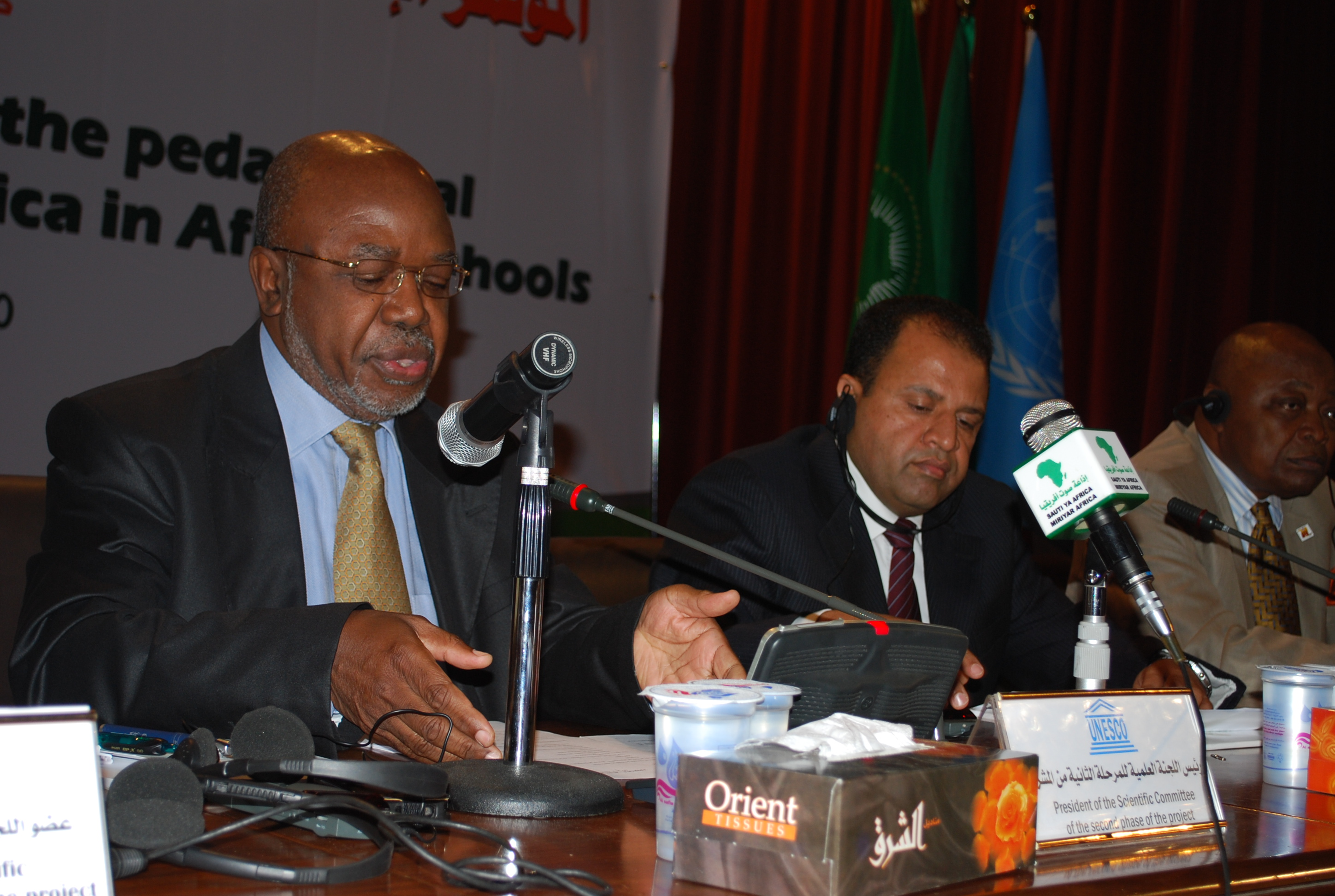
2010 Scientific Committee Meeting for the General History of Africa

Coordinating reviewer, historian and archaeologist Doulaye Konate stated the volume featured a general review of the archaeology of sub-Saharan Africa and “one of the strengths of the work is an emphasis on the African roots of the Egyptian civilization”. He later stated the Volume II of General History of Africa had integrated the Pharaonic civilization into a ‘Negro-African bosom’.

In a chapter review of Volume II (which featured the conclusions of the 1974 symposium) by a single Egyptologist and anthropologist, Alain Anselin, he stated that the traditional historical view of a “wave of civilizing peoples” from the north to the south had been displaced in favour of a unifying movement from south to north. He also alluded to recent research accumulated over three decades which had confirmed the migration of peoples from the Sahara and regions south of Egypt to the Nile Valley. Anselin argued that this aligned with the position of the late Cheikh Anta Diop, who had attempted to "restore Egypt to its southern African hinterland". Anselin referenced a range of specialist studies (anthropology, linguistics, population genetics and archaeology) presented at a triennial conference in 2005 which he stated was a continuation of the 1974 recommendations. This included a genetic study which quantified the "key impact" of Sub-Saharan populations and showed that the early pre-dynastic population of the Berber people of the Siwa Oasis in north-western Egypt had close demographic links with people of North-East Africa. He further described the value of other studies such as a Crubezy study which "traced the boundaries of the ancient Khoisan settlement to Upper Egypt, where its faint traces remain identifiable and Keita’s work, as the most groundbreaking", and that Cerny's team had identified close genetic and linguistic links between the peoples of Upper Egypt, North Cameroon (some of whom spoke Chadic languages) and Ethiopia (some of whom spoke Kushitic languages).

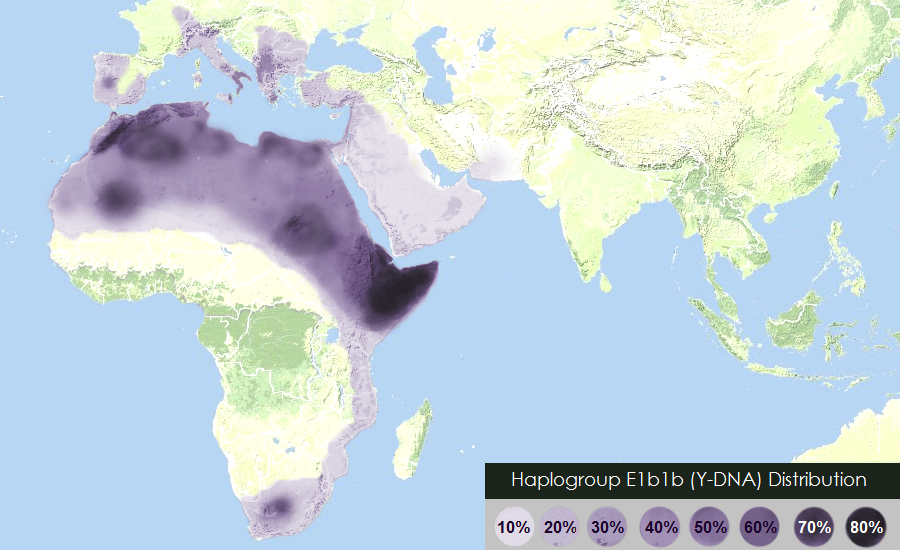
E1b1b is the most common paternal haplogroup across Africa, including Egypt, with modern genetic studies rooting the origin of the E haplogroup in East Africa.

Biological anthropologist S.O.Y. Keita stated that the ancient population of Egypt emerged primarily from interactions from local ancient Nilotic and Saharan populations with some groups such as the Beja in Sudan and Egypt having long assimilated peoples from local Arab pastoral groups. He also stated the presence of the E haplogroup, based on the indications from current evidence (sourced from a number of genetic studies) likely originated and experienced most genetic mutations in tropical East Africa, had widespread distribution across Africa including Egypt. Keita further stated this had implications for older conceptions of ‘race’ and African populations. He also argued that the P2 lineage ancestral to the E1b1b haplogroup showed a primary connection between males from all over Africa including sub-Saharan Africa and Egypt.

British archaeologist David Wengrow noted that the legacy of racial studies had led to a shift towards repositioning of Egypt in an African context with greater reliance on historical linguistics, physical anthropology and analysis of genetic diversity.

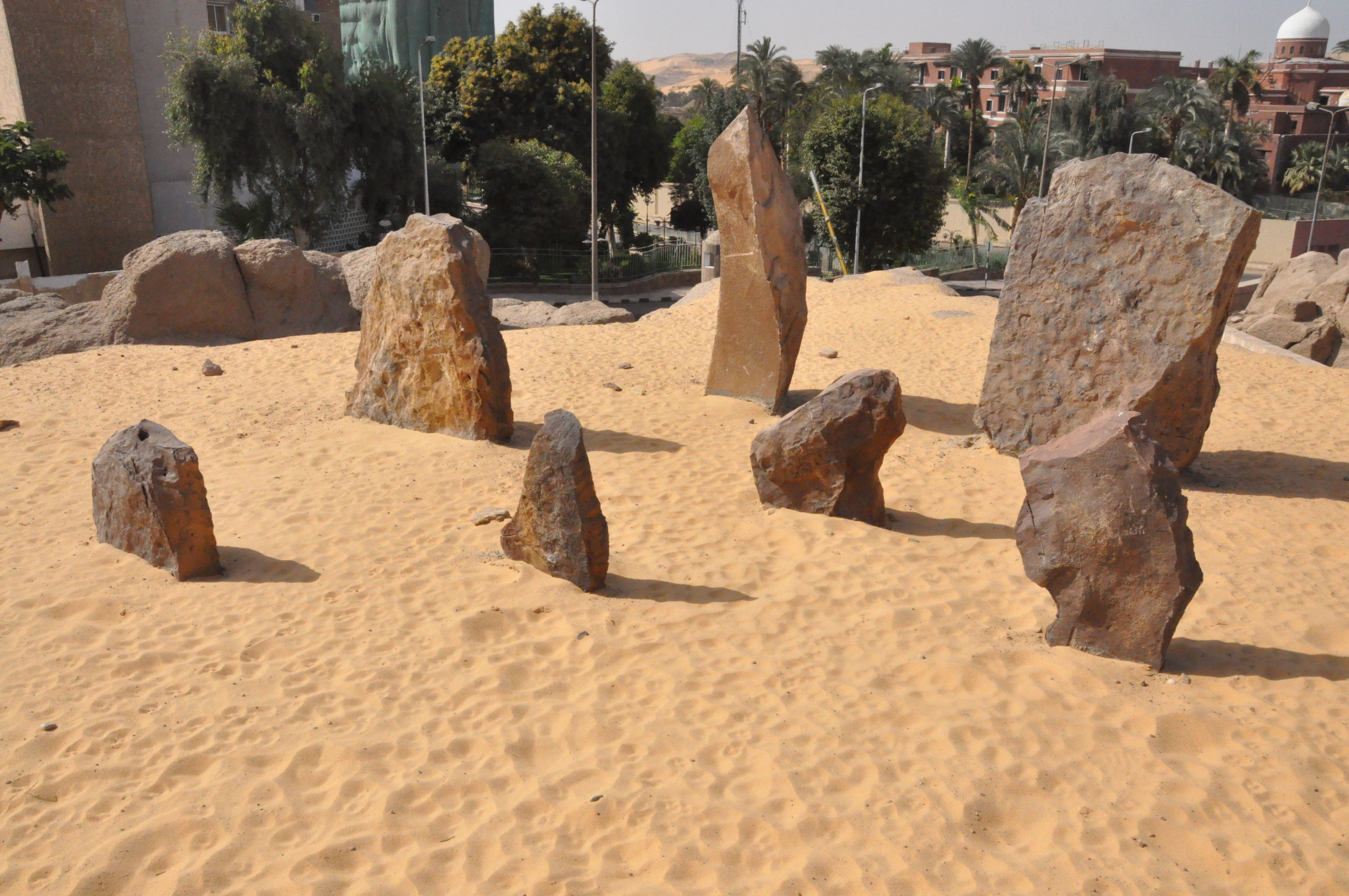
Megaliths from Nabta Playa, constructed by Neolithic populations, located in Aswan, Upper Egypt. Excavations of the megalith structures were completed in 2008.

Egyptian historian and archaeological inspector at the Ministry of Antiquities, H. A. A. Ibrahim, examined the megalithic complex of Nabta Playa, Upper Egypt to understand the cultural and population influences of the Holocene on pre-dynastic Egypt. She cited an anthropological study confirming the appearance of a Sub-Saharan high status child in a ceremonial centre and concluded that the megalithic structures had close resemblance to comparable structures in the Sahelian and Sub-Saharan regions of Africa.

In another chapter on the population genetics of pharaonic Egypt, geneticist Jean Phillipe Gourdine adduced correlative sources of linguistic, anthropological, paleontological and genetic evidence which demonstrated African affinities with specific Neolithic and predynastic remains at the Naqada, Badari and Adaima sites in Upper Egypt. He referenced a number of studies performed by Eric Crubézy, this included genetic analysis on the modern Upper Egyptian population in Adaima which identified genetic markers common across Africa, with 71% of the Adaima samples carrying E1b1 haplogroup and 3% carrying the L0f mitochondrial haplogroup. This was supported by an anthropological study by Cruzeby in the pre-dynastic cemetery at Adaima (3700 BCE) which found the notable presence of dental markers, characteristic of Khoisan people, (25%) among several children’s teeth." Gourdine also stated the geological African context of Egypt along with the migratory movements of Homo Sapiens from the Green Sahara, drying of Lake Chad and back Asia to Africa migration, must be taken into consideration to develop an understanding of the Pharaonic Egyptian population.

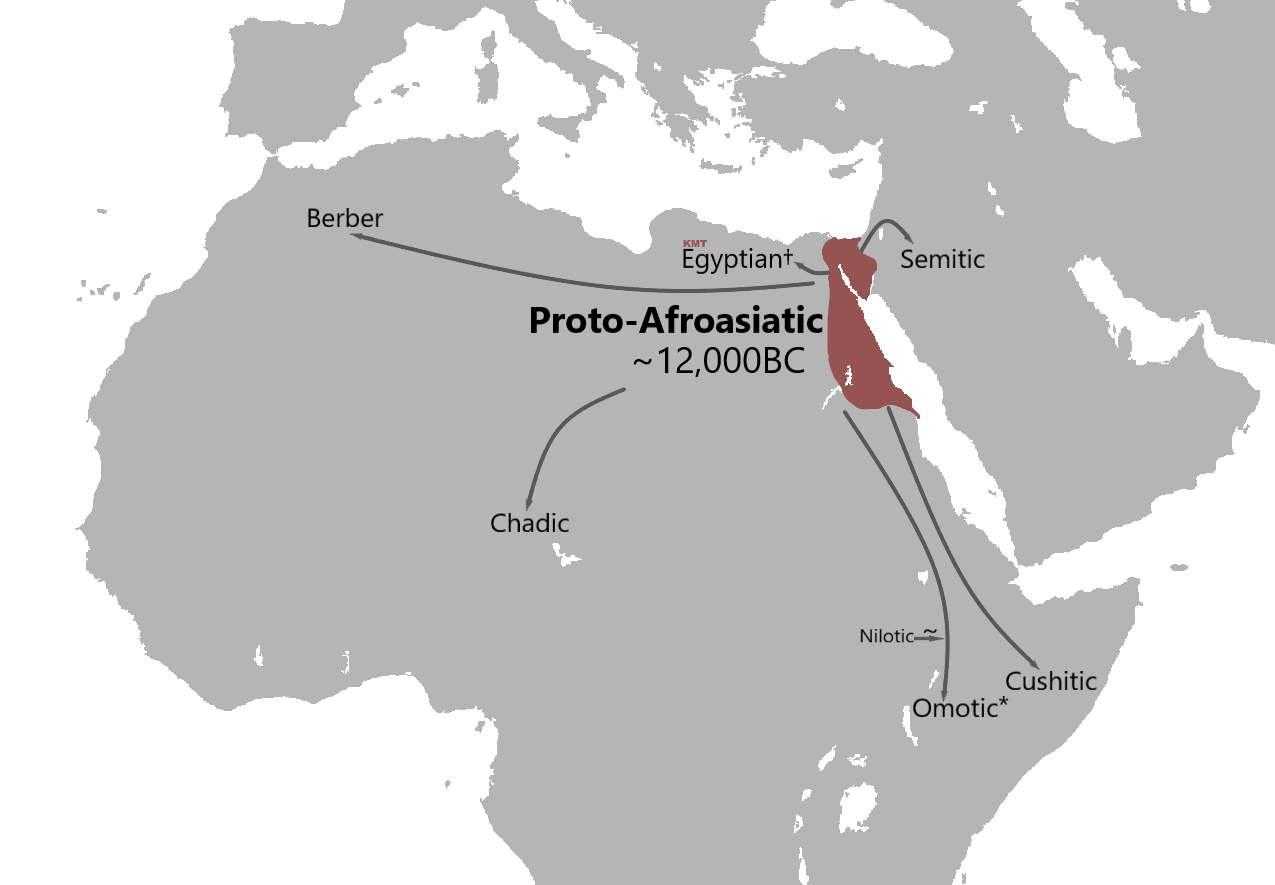
A reconstructed map of the Proto-Afroasiatic homeland, the ancient Egyptian language is classified as part of the phylum family. There is no universal agreement on the original, baseline location for the proto-language speakers. However, a majority of linguistic scholars "(Ehret, Bender, Fleming, Takacs)" remain supportive an African origin whereas others such as "Milatarev" endorse a Near Eastern origin.

Linguistic studies has situated the Egyptian language in the Afro-Asiatic family phylum which included the Berber, Chadic, Kushitic, Egyptian, Omotic and Semitic languages. There is no agreement on the exact origin of the proto-language but most linguists are supportive of an African origin of the proto-language spoken between 13,000 to 15,000 years whereas others support a Near Eastern origin dated to 10,000 years ago. A featured linguist, Roger Blench, in the publication had argued this remained an area of controversy due to archaeological evidence and textual sources which have suggested a origin of dispersal in the Near East. Nevertheless, he also stated that all the diversity of the Afro-Asiatic language family is concentrated in Sub Saharan Africa, especially in Ethiopia (including Omotic and Cushitic languages). Blench himself has argued that lexicon in the Chadic language is suggestive of migration westwards into waterways joining the Nile Basin with Lake Chad. He further added that it was possible that early Afro-Asiatic speakers had domesticated wild cattle in the Egyptian-Sudanese border 10,000 years ago.

Other African scholars in the recent volume including Augustin Holl, Olabiyi B.J. Yai, Yoporeka Somet and Martial Ze Belinga made favourable references to the intellectual influence of Cheikh Anta Diop in explicating bias in Western scholarship and serving as an early figure in constructing a multidisciplinary approach, with a particular emphasis on a scientific methodology, towards African history. Somet also observed the value of Diop's prescient writings in recognizing the African origin of humanity and early Egyptian civilization by "the middle of the century".

== Position of modern scholarship ==
Modern scholars who have studied ancient Egyptian culture and population history have responded to the controversy over the race of the ancient Egyptians in various ways.

Since the late 20th century, as the science of human population genetics has advanced, most biological anthropologists have come to reject the notion of race as having any validity in the study of human biology.

Mainstream scholarship have situated the ethnicity and the origins of predynastic, southern Egypt as a foundational community primarily in northeast Africa which included the Sudan, tropical Africa and the Sahara whilst recognising the population variability that became characteristic of the pharaonic period. Pharaonic Egypt featured a physical gradation across the regional populations, with Upper Egyptians having shared more biological affinities with Sudanese and southernly African populations, whereas Lower Egyptians had closer genetic links with Levantine and Mediterranean populations.

=== Views from Egyptologists and African historians ===
Frank J. Yurco outlined in a 1989 article that "In short, ancient Egypt, like modern Egypt, consisted of a very heterogeneous population". He also wrote in 1990: "When you talk about Egypt, it's just not right to talk about black or white .... To take the terminology here in the United States and graft it onto Africa is anthropologically inaccurate". Yurco added that "We are applying a racial divisiveness to Egypt that they would never have accepted, They would have considered this argument absurd, and that is something we could really learn from." Yurco wrote in 1996 that "the peoples of Egypt, the Sudan, and much of North-East Africa are generally regarded as a Nilotic continuity, with widely ranging physical features (complexions light to dark, various hair and craniofacial types)".

British Africanist, Basil Davidson, summarised in 1990, that "It follows that the Ancient Egyptians were Africans even if immigrants also trickled in from Asia and southern Europe. Where the ancient Egyptians were black or as brown in skin colour as other Africans may remain an issue of emotive dispute; probably they were both".

Gamal Mokthar, editor of the UNESCO General History of Africa, wrote in 1990 that "It is more than probable that the African strain, black or light, is preponderant in the Ancient Egyptian, but in the present state of our knowledge it is impossible to say more". Mokhtar further added that Upper Egypt and Nubia held "similar ethnic composition" with comparable material culture.

Egyptologist Miriam Lichtheim, in 1990, wrote that "The Egyptians were not Nubians, and the original Nubians were not black. Nubia gradually became black because black peoples migrated northward out of Central Africa".

Christopher Ehret wrote in 1996: "Ancient Egyptian civilization was, in ways and to an extent usually not recognized, fundamentally African. The evidence of both language and culture reveals these African roots. The origins of Egyptian ethnicity lay in the areas south of Egypt".

Donald B. Redford wrote in 2004 that: "The old notion of waves of "races" flowing up the Nile Valley, effecting cultural change and improvement, is now known to be as erroneous as it was simplistic. New ideas need not come by means of invasion: occasionally they are indigenous and may parallel similar discoveries elsewhere which are wholly unrelated."

Barry J. Kemp wrote in 2007 that the black/white argument, though politically understandable, is an oversimplification that hinders an appropriate evaluation of the scientific data on the ancient Egyptians since it does not take into consideration the difficulty in ascertaining complexion from skeletal remains. It also ignores the fact that Africa is inhabited by many other populations besides Bantu related ("Negroid") groups. He wrote that in reconstructions of life in ancient Egypt, modern Egyptians would therefore be the most logical and closest approximation to the ancient Egyptians. Kemp also wrote that "sample populations available from northern Egypt from before the 1st Dynasty (Merimda, Maadi and Wadi Digla) turn out to be significantly different from sample populations from early Palestine and Byblos, suggesting a lack of common ancestors over a long time" and the anthropological measurements of ancient Egyptians male limb length proportions had grouped "them with Africans rather than with Europeans".

Barbara Mertz wrote in 2011: "Egyptian civilization was not Mediterranean or African, Semitic or Hamitic, black or white, but all of them. It was, in short, Egyptian."

Kathryn Bard wrote in 2014: "Egyptians were the indigenous farmers of the lower Nile valley, neither black nor white as races are conceived of today".

Federico Puigdevall and Albert Cañagueral wrote in 2017: "There are defenders of the theory that the pharaohs were black, and there are those who maintain they had Caucasian origins. Neither theory is provable".

Nicky Nielsen wrote in 2020: "Ancient Egypt was neither black nor white, and the repeated attempt by advocates of either ideology to seize the ownership of ancient Egypt simply perpetuates an old tradition: one of removing agency and control of their heritage from the modern population living along the banks of the Nile."

Marc Van De Mieroop wrote in 2021: "Some scholars have tried to determine what Egyptians could have looked like by comparing their skeletal remains with those of recent populations, but the samples are so limited and the interpretations so fraught with uncertainties that this is an unreliable approach". He concluded that ancient Egypt's "location at the edge of northeast Africa and its geography as a corridor between that continent and Asia opened it up to influences from all directions, in terms of both culture and of demography."

=== Views from Archaeologists ===
David Wengrow, Michael Dee, Sarah Foster, Alice Stevenson and Christopher Bronk Ramsey wrote in 2015: "The African origins of Egyptian civilisation lie in an important cultural horizon, the ‘primary pastoral community’, which emerged in both the Egyptian and Sudanese parts of the Nile Valley in the fifth millennium BC."

Robert Morkot wrote in 2005:

The ancient Egyptians were not 'white' in any European sense, nor were they 'Caucasian'... we can say that the earliest population of ancient Egypt included African people from the upper Nile, African people from the regions of the Sahara and modern Libya, and smaller numbers of people who had come from south-western Asia and perhaps the Arabian peninsula.

Felix Chami wrote in 2006 that Egyptian iconography had shown "that their physical type, like most of the people of the African communities, was both black and brown."

Fekri Hassan wrote in 2021 in regards to the origins of Egypt that "the original African populations of the Nile Valley, who showed a local gradual change in physical traits from south to north due to distance, hosted peoples who drifted from southwest Asia".

William Stiebling and Susan Helft wrote in 2023 on the historical debate concerning the race and ethnicity of the ancient Egyptians in light of recent evidence. They argued that the physical appearances would have varied along a continuum from the Delta to the Nile’s source regions in the south. The authors specified that “some ancient Egyptians looked more Middle Eastern and others looked more Sudanese or Ethiopians of today, and some may even have looked like other groups in Africa”. The authors reached the view that "Egypt was a unique civilization with genetic and cultural ties linking it to other African cultures to its south and west and to Mediterranean and Near Eastern cultures to its north".

=== Views from Biological anthropologists ===
Anthropologist Bernard R. Ortiz De Montellano wrote in 1993: "The claim that all Egyptians, or even all the pharaohs, were black, is not valid. Most scholars believe that Egyptians in antiquity looked pretty much as they look today, with a gradation of darker shades toward the Sudan".

Nancy Lovell wrote in 1999 that studies of skeletal remains indicate that the physical characteristics of ancient southern Egyptians and Nubians were "within the range of variation" for both ancient and modern indigenous peoples of the Sahara and tropical Africa, and that the distribution of population characteristics "seems to follow a clinal pattern from south to north", which may be explained by natural selection as well as gene flow between neighboring populations. Lovell outlined that "In general, the inhabitants of Upper Egypt and Nubia had the greatest biological affinity to people of the Sahara and more southerly areas". She also wrote that the archaeological and inscriptional evidence for contact between Egypt and Syro-Palestine "suggests that gene flow between these areas was very likely", and that the early Nile Valley populations were "part of an African lineage, but exhibiting local variation".

Stuart Tyson Smith wrote in 2001: "Any characterization of race of the ancient Egyptians depends on modern cultural definitions, not on scientific study. Thus, by modern American standards it is reasonable to characterize the Egyptians as 'black', while acknowledging the scientific evidence for the physical diversity of Africans." He continues: "Ancient Egyptian practices show strong similarities to modern African cultures including divine kingship, the use of headrests, body art, circumcision, and male coming of-age rituals, all suggesting an African substratum or foundation for Egyptian civilisation". Smith also wrote in 2004: "Egyptian art depicts Nubians with stereotypical dark skin, facial features, hairstyles, and dress, all very different from Egyptians and the other two ethnic groups, Asiatics and Libyans". He adds that "no single material correlate, no matter how abundantly represented, unambiguously reflects ethnic group affiliation".

Sonia Zakrzewski who wrote in 2003 studied skeletal samples from the Badarian period to the Middle Kingdom in Upper Egypt. The raw data suggested that the Ancient Egyptians in general had "tropical body plans" but that their proportions were actually "super-negroid", i.e. the limb indices are relatively longer than in many "African" populations. She proposed that the apparent development of an increasingly African body plan over time may also be due to Nubian mercenaries being included in the Middle Kingdom sample. Although, she noted that in spite of the differences in tibiae lengths among the Badarian and Early Dynastic samples, that "all samples lie relatively clustered together as compared to the other populations". Zakrzewski concluded that the "results must remain provisional due to the relatively small sample sizes and the lack of skeletal material that cross-cuts all social and economic groups within each time period."

S.O.Y. Keita wrote in 2022 on the origins and the identity of the Ancient Egyptians. He examined various forms of evidence which included archaeology, historical linguistics and biological data to determine the population affinities. He concluded that "various disciplines indicate the groundings of Egypt within Northeastern Africa" and the ancient Egyptians "were a people and society that emerged in the Saharo-Nilotic region of Northeast Africa". Keita also reviewed studies on the biological affinities of the Ancient Egyptian population and wrote in 1993 that the original inhabitants of the Nile Valley were primarily a variety of indigenous Northeast Africans from the areas of the desiccating Sahara and more southerly areas. He also added that whilst Egyptian society became more socially complex and biologically varied, the "ethnicity of the Niloto-Saharo-Sudanese origins did not change".

== Scholarly views on bias ==
Various scholars have highlighted the role of colonial racism in shaping the attitudes of early Egyptologists, and criticised the continued over-representation of North American and European perspectives in the field. Diop in his work, The African Origin of Civilization argued that the prevailing views in Egyptology were driven by biased scholarship and colonial attitudes. Similarly, Bruce Trigger wrote that early modern scholarship on the Nile Valley populations had been "marred by a confusion of race, language, and culture and by an accompanying racism".

Criticism has also been levelled at modern anthropological studies of Nile valley populations. This has related to interpretations of biological Africans. These past approaches have been viewed to subscribe to a narrow craniometric paradigm which classifies certain African populations as “True Negroes”, whilst categorising Egyptians, Nubians, Somalians as non-Africans despite having a shared biocultural evolutionary climate.

Smith wrote in 2018 that a common practice among Egyptologists was to "divorce Egypt from its proper northeast African context, instead framing it as fundamentally part of a Near Eastern or "Mediterranean" economic, social and political sphere, hardly African at all or at best a crossroad between the Near East, the eastern Mediterranean and Africa, which carries with it the implication that it is ultimately not really part of Africa". He explicitly criticises Van De Mieroop's comments that ancient Egypt was clearly 'in Africa' it was not so clearly 'of Africa' as reflecting "long-standing Egyptological biases". He concluded that the interrelated cultural features shared between northeast African dynamic and Pharaonic Egypt are not "survivals" or coincidence, but shared traditions with common origins in the deep past".

Andrea Manzo wrote in 2022 that early Egyptologists had situated the origins of dynastic Egypt within a "broad Hamitic horizon that characterised several regions of Africa" and that these views had continued to dominate in the second half of the twentieth century. Manzo stated more recent studies had "pointed out the relevance of African elements to the rise of Egyptian culture, following earlier suggestions on Egyptian kingship and religion by Henri Frankfort" which countered the traditional view that considered Egypt "more closely linked to the Near East than to the rest of Africa".

Ehret recounted in 2023 that the previous two centuries of Western scholarship had presented Egypt as an "offshoot of earlier Middle Eastern developments". He continued to argue that these old ideas had influenced the attitudes of scholars in other disciplines such as genetics and their approaches. Ehret was especially critical of the sampling methods and wider conclusions of a 2017 genetic study which conflicted with existing archaeological, linguistic, genetic and biological anthropological evidence. According to Ehret, these sources of evidence had already determined the founding populations of Ancient Egypt in areas such as Naqada and El-Badari to be the descendants of longtime inhabitants in Northeastern Africa which included Nubia and the northern Horn of Africa.

Genetic studies have been criticised by several scholars for a range of methodological problems and providing misleading racial classifications. Boyce and Keita argued that certain studies have adopted a selective approach in sampling, such as using samples drawn mostly from northern (Lower) Egypt, which has historically had the presence of more foreigners from the Mediterranean and the Near East, and using those samples as representing the rest of Egypt. Thus, excluding the 'darker' south or Upper Egypt which presents a false impression of Egyptian variability. The authors also note that chromosomal patterns have featured inconsistent labelling such as Haplotype V as seen the with use of misleading terms like "Arabic" to describe it, implying this haplotype is of 'Middle Eastern' origins. However, when the haplotype V variant is looked at in context, it does have a very high prevalence in African countries above the Sahara and in Ethiopia.

In 2022, Danielle Candelora criticised how modern DNA studies are misused for political and racist agendas. As an example she cites the media echo about the Schuenemann genome study published in 2017, which was "sensationalized in the media as proof that Egyptians were not black Africans" in spite of its methodological limits, and taken by white supremacists as "scientific evidence" to justify their view on the achievements of the Ancient Egyptian civilisation. Candelora also noted that the media overlooked methodological limitations with the study such as the "untested sampling methods, small sample size, and problematic comparative data". However an unpublished, follow-up study in 2022 sampled six different excavation sites along the entire length of the Nile Valley, spanning 4,000 years of Egyptian history, and the 18 high quality mitochondrial genomes that were reconstructed which the authors argued supported the results from the 2017 Schuenemann genome study.

UNESCO scholars Augustin Holl and Jean Gourdine both presented similar forms of criticisms, in the General History of Africa Volume IX, of the 2017 Scheunemann study in terms of its geographical coverage, general conclusions on the population of Egypt and methodological approach. Gourdine argued there are a number of biases in the interpretation which conflicted with other analysis such as the Amarna STR analysis and evidence of identifiable African haplogroups such as E1b1b1, JK2955 (haplogroup L3) and JK2963 (haplogroup M1a1i), which preceded the trans-Saharan slave trade in Egypt.

Canadian historian Elise K Burton (2025) argued that recent aDNA research are deeply influenced by racial debates over the ethnicity of ancient Egyptians. She advanced the view that the perspectives of Western, West African and Egyptian scientific researchers have shaped the interpretation of genetic research and this has triggered conflict over access to the mummified remains of ancient Egyptians. She criticised early attempts of Cheikh Anta Diop to leverage paleoserology as reflecting racialist standards defined by European scholarship. Burton also expressed criticism for nationalist sentiments exhibited among Egyptian scholars such as Zahi Hawass and restricting foreign access to Egyptian royal mummies to maintain “genetic sovereignty”. She further highlighted that anti-black racism endured in Egyptian society and nationalist genetics presented its own variant of racialist genetics, as discussed in reference to the national genome project in Egypt. Lastly, Burton believed that Euro-American researchers benefited from the historical colonialism in facilitating a widely available source of Egyptian mummies in European museums. She also mentioned that recent studies such as the 2017 DNA study have been interpreted under a racialised lens.

== Present-day controversies ==
Today the issues regarding the race of the ancient Egyptians are "troubled waters which most people who write about ancient Egypt from within the mainstream of scholarship avoid." The debate, therefore, takes place mainly in the public sphere and tends to focus on a small number of specific issues.

=== Greco-Roman accounts of Ancient Egypt ===
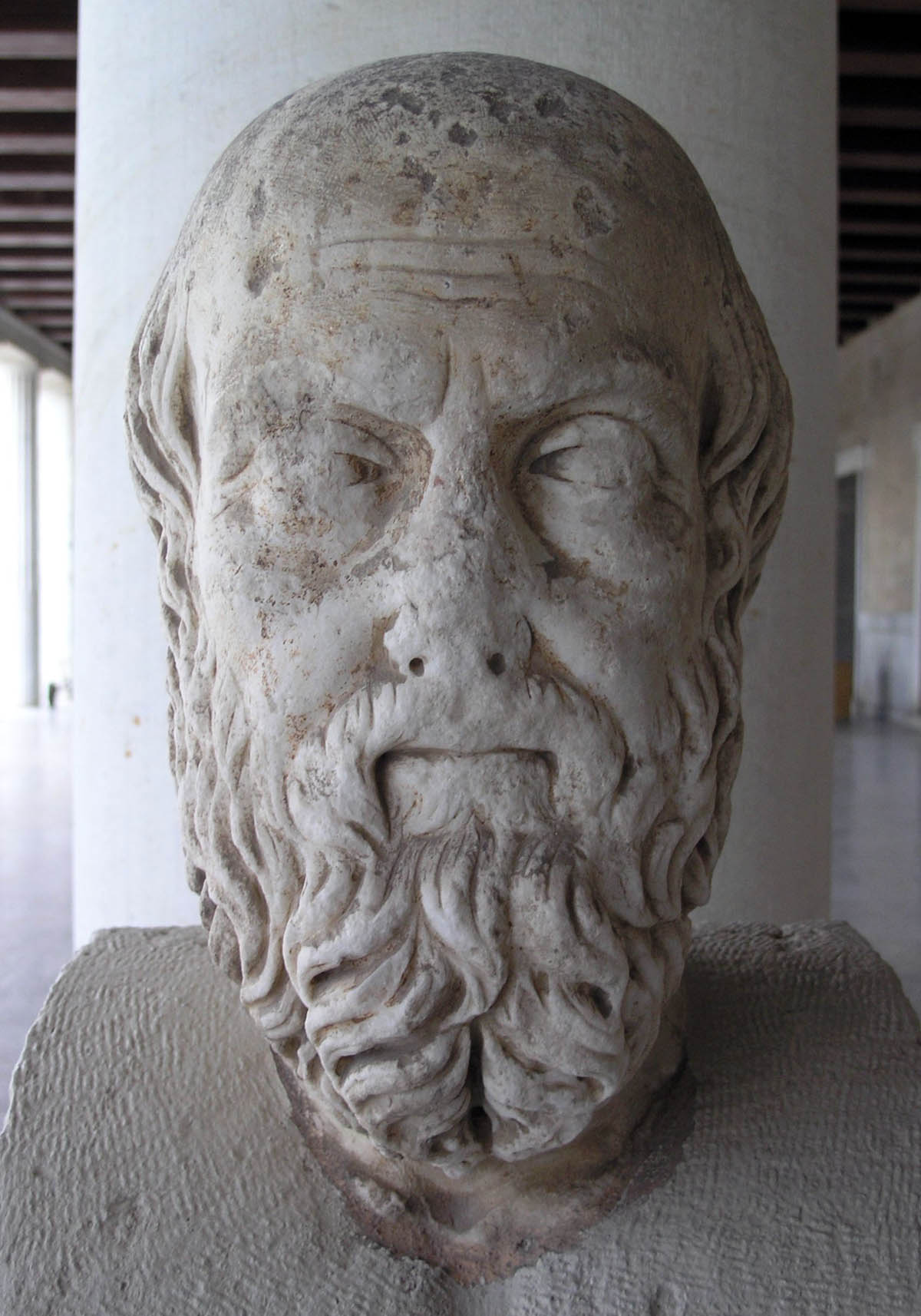
Herodotus, the "father of history", wrote that Egyptians had dark skin and woolly hair.

A range of scholars have cited the classical observations of prominent Greeks and Romans as forms of primary evidence to denote the physical appearance of the early Egyptians. Some historical accounts have drawn close physical and cultural resemblances between Egyptians and Ethiopians whereas others have associated them more closely with northern Indians.

In the fifth century BCE, Greek historian, Herodotus, described the Egyptians as having “melanchrones skin and wooly hair and secondly, and more reliably for the reason that alone among mankind the Egyptians and the Ethiopians have practiced circumcision since time immemorial.” Herodotus also wrote that the Ammonians of Siwa Oasis are "colonists from Egypt and Aethiopia and speak a language compounded of the tongues of both countries".

In the first century BCE, Greek historian Diodorus Siculus, in his work Bibliotheca Historica, reported that the Ethiopians claimed that Egypt was an early colony, and that the Ethiopians also cited evidence that they were more ancient than the Egyptians as he wrote:

"The Ethiopians say that the Egyptians are one of their colonies which was brought into Egypt by Osiris".

Diodorus Siculus also discussed the similar cultural practices between the Ethiopians and Egyptians such as the writing systems as he states "We must now speak about the Ethiopian writing which is called hieroglyphic among the Egyptians, in order that we may omit nothing in our discussion of their antiquities".

Ammianus Marcellinus, (325/330-after 391) served as a Greco-Roman historian in 4th century CE, He described “the men of Egypt are mostly brown and black with a skinny and desiccated look.”

Arrian, Greek historian, wrote in the 1st-century AD that "The appearance of the inhabitants is also not very different in India and Ethiopia: the southern Indians are rather more like Ethiopians as they are black to look on, and their hair is black; only they are not so snub-nosed or woolly-haired as the Ethiopians; the northern Indians are most like the Egyptians physically".

According to a passage sourced from Strabo, Greek geographer, 1st-century AD, northern Indians held similar physical characteristics as the Egyptians: "As for the people of India, those in the south are like the Aethiopians in colour, although they are like the rest in respect to countenance and hair (for on account of the humidity of the air their hair does not curl), whereas those in the north are like the Aegyptians".

Secondary interpretation of these historical descriptions have remained a source of academic contention.

Professor of African Studies at Temple University, Molefi Kete Asante has referenced other examples from Herodotus's primary account for which he interprets to describe the physical appearance of Egyptians as Africans. This has included the following sourced statements "the flooding of the Nile could not be caused by snow, because the natives of the country (Egypt) are black from the heat" and descriptions of an oracle as Egyptian based on Dodoneans "calling the dove black,[which] they indicated that the woman was Egyptian".

However, Professor Yaacov Shavit of Tel Aviv University, argued that "[t]he evidence clearly shows that those Greco-Roman authors who refer to the skin color and other physical traits distinguish sharply between Ethiopians (Nubians) and Egyptians, and rarely do they refer to the Egyptians as black, even though they were described as darker than themselves.... [in addition,] Egyptians and Nubians were both clearly distinguished from the black Africans."

Classical author Frank Snowden argued that terms used by ancient Greek and Roman writers to describe the physical characteristics of other ancient peoples differed from contemporary racial terminology in the West.

Keita and Boyce expressed caution on the use and reliability of primary accounts and instead favoured population biology. Nonetheless, they found these descriptions on the origins of early Egyptians aligned with modern sources of anthropological data (cranial, limb proportion studies) which identified greater similarities between early Egyptians and North-East African populations (Somalia, Nubia and Kushites) that were "Ethiopians" in the Greek traditional sense. In a later chapter, Keita observed that some Greeks reported that Egypt was an Ethiopian colony but distinctions were made between Egyptians and Ethiopians in ancient accounts, but it remained unclear whether these distinctions were made on cultural rather on biological grounds.

=== Ta netjer and the location of ancestral homeland ===
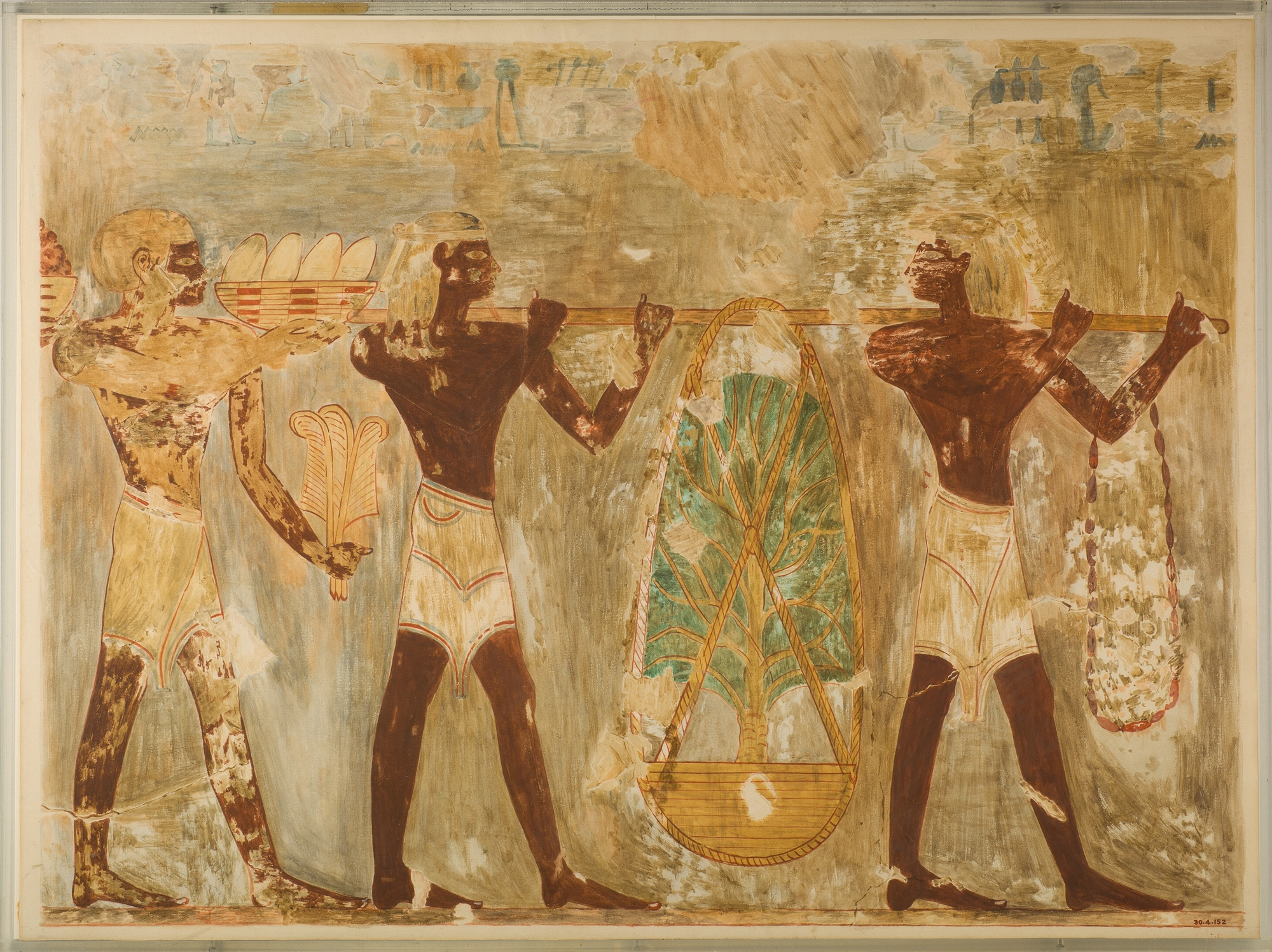
Men from The Land of Punt carrying gifts, tomb of Rekhmire

Older literature maintained that the label "God's Land", when interpreted as "Holy Land" or "Land of the gods/ancestors", meant that the ancient Egyptians viewed the Land of Punt as their ancestral homeland.

Flinders Petrie believed that the Dynastic Race came from or through Punt and that "Pan, or Punt, was a district at the south end of the Red Sea, which probably embraced both the African and Arabian shores." Moreover, E. A. Wallis Budge stated that "Egyptian tradition of the Dynastic Period held that the aboriginal home of the Egyptians was Punt...". James Breasted in 1906 argued that the term Ta netjer was not only applied to Punt, located southeast of Egypt, but also to regions of Asia east and northeast of Egypt, such as Lebanon, which was the source of wood for temples.

Modern scholars have noted that while the term was applied to the Land of Punt, Punt's exact location had historically been a subject of scholarly debate with a spectrum of views associating it with regions extending from Ethiopia to southern Arabia. Recent consensus has now located the region in modern northeast Africa due to the prevalence of indigenous goods and animals which are reflected in Egyptian reliefs and paintings.

In the view of British Africanist, Basil Davidson, the land of gods and ancestors of Egyptians was discussed in reference to lands south and west of their civilisation.

British archaeologist, Jacke Phillips, argued that the term "Ta Netjer" (God's Land) was applied to regions south and west of Egypt, which included not only Punt but other regions entitled "Irem" and "Am(am)", with the latter regions accessible through Punt and Nubia. Phillips further argued that Irem was most likely the same location accessed by Harkhuf through his expeditions into inner Africa during the Old Kingdom period.

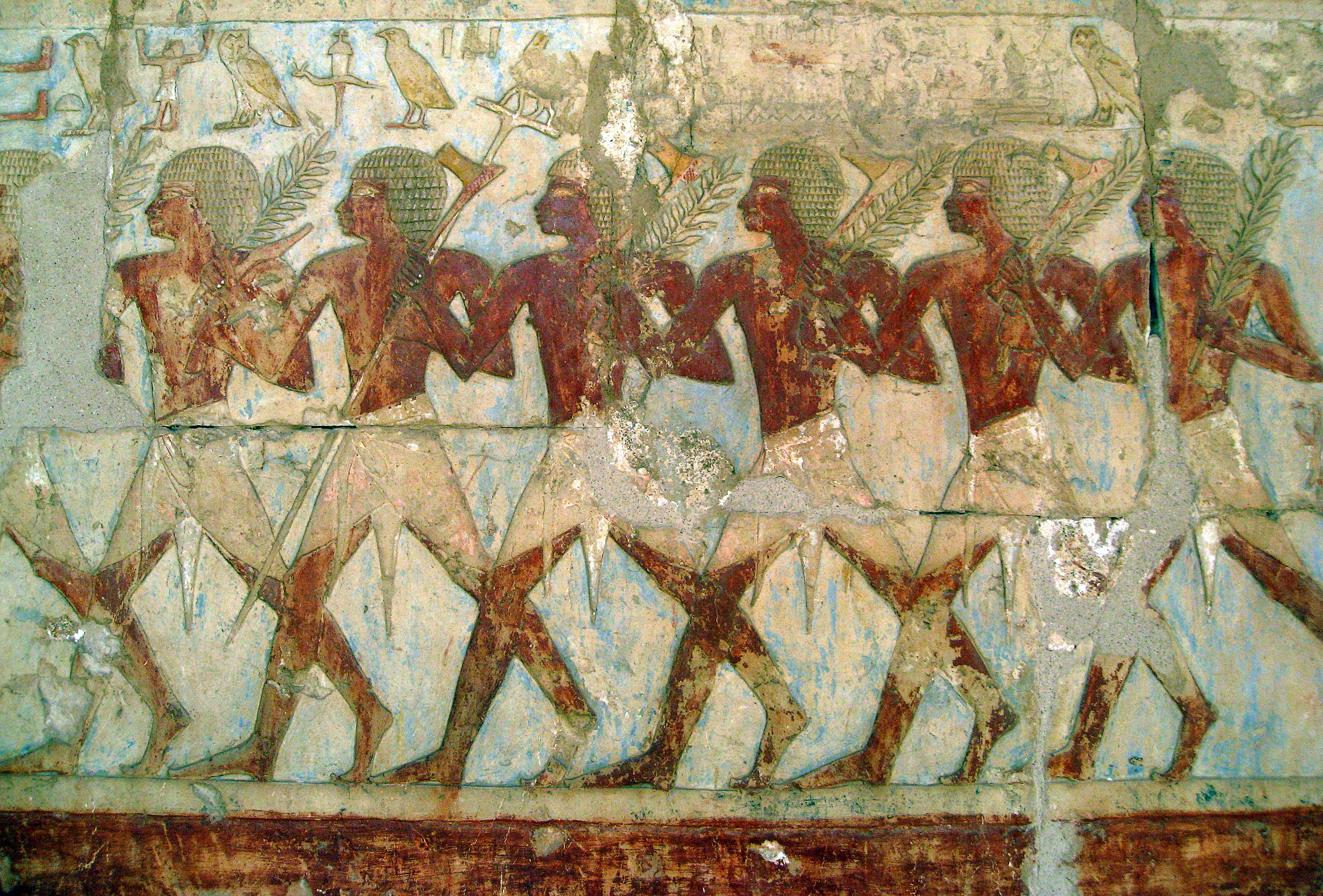
Egyptian soldiers bear tree branches and axes from a trading expedition to the Land of Punt

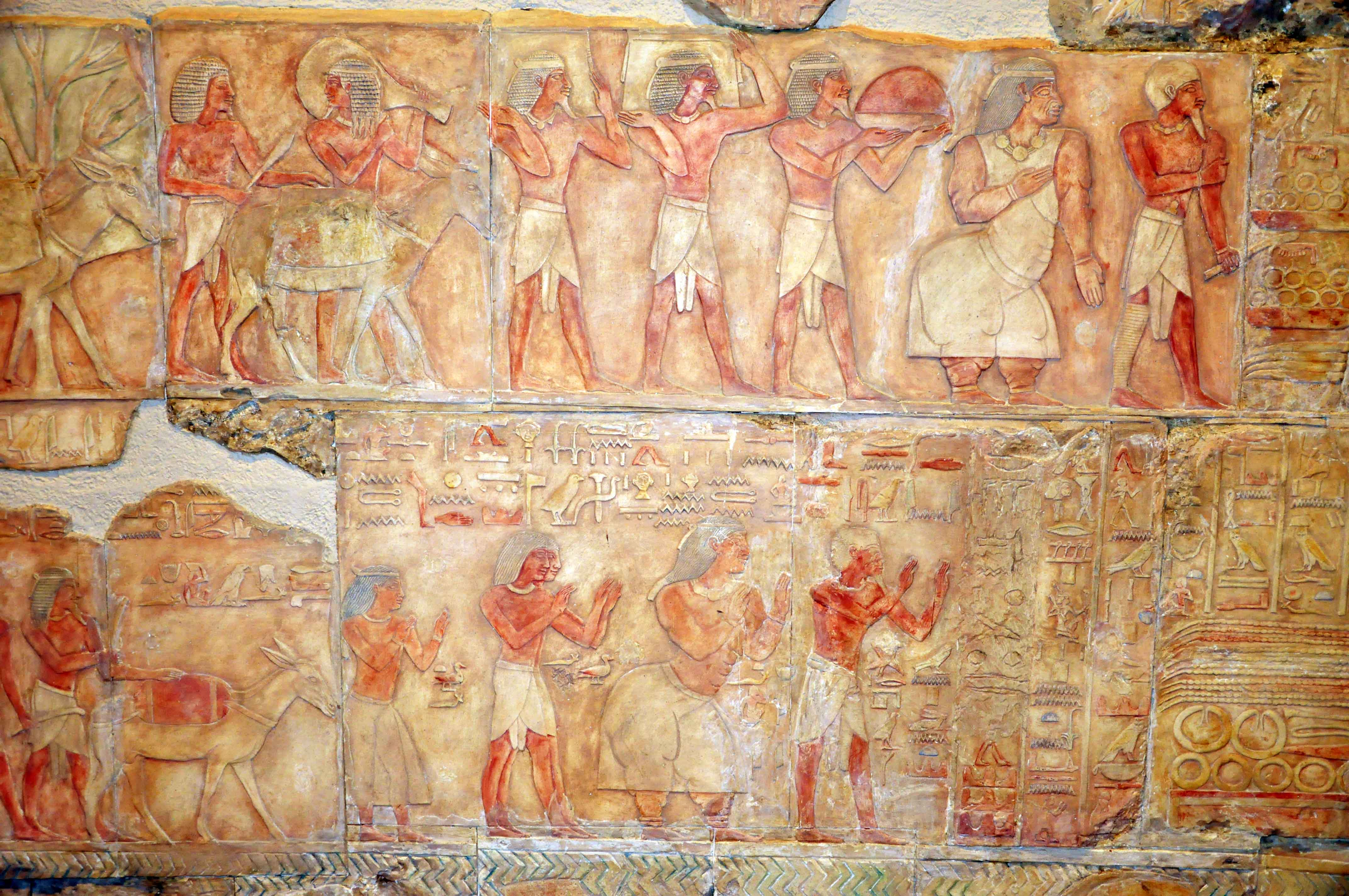
Puntites including their Queen, bearing tributes, represented in the classic reddish-brown colouring as Egyptians

According to Senegalese Egyptologist, Aboubacry Moussa Lam, the Egyptians considered the Land of Punt as being their ancestral homeland.

Stuart Tyson Smith, Egyptologist and professor of anthropology at University of California, Santa Barbara, wrote in 2001 that "The scene of an expedition to Punt from Queen Hatshepsuis mortuary complex at Deir el-Bahri shows Puntites with red skin and facial features similar to Egyptians, long or bobbed hair, goatee beards, and kilts".

In 2006, Tanzanian archaeologist, Felix Chami, had drawn on established scholarly interpretations of Egyptologists, Jean Leclant, Timothy Kendall and Kenneth Kitchen, in reaching the view:

“The most interesting part of the Egyptian knowledge about Sub-Saharan Africa is in relation to Punt and God’s Land, or the lands of the gods. These lands had traded with Egypt since 2500 BC or even before. The Egyptians are not known to have had any war with the people of Punt, probably due to the fact that the land was not near enough to wage wars of conquest (kitchen, 1999: 174). These were lands of semi-mythical “horizon dwellers”. Egyptians also considered their gods or ancestors to have originated from these lands thought to be in eastern and southern Africa (Whicker, 1990) and hence “God’s land” (Kitchen, 1993:592). The records of the last Millennium BC show that Osiris and Isis, the most powerful Egyptian god and goddess, were “Ethiopians”/Black originating from countries in the south of Africa (Leclant, 1997: 157; Kendall, 1997: 171; Waterfield, 1967).”

Africana professor, Aaron Kamugisha, reviewed the historiography and cultural debates concerning the ethnic status of the Ancient Egyptian population in 2003. He was critical of Kathryn Bard's views that Ancient Egyptians were a "Mediterranean peoples" and could not be classified as Sub-Saharan Blacks. In particular, her argued her views lacked wholesale consistency as she later stated that Egyptian artistic representations which depicted of Ancient Puntites' facial features looked "more Egyptian than "black". In Kamguisha's view, this overlooked the fact that Punt is now generally regarded to be located in Somalia.

UNESCO scholar, Alan Anselin, observed that a conclusive view on the relations between Egypt and Punt remain tentative until further textual and archaeological evidence can confirm the full nature of their historical connections. Tanzanian archaeologist, Felix A. Chami, also maintained that cultural relationship between Egypt and Punt along with its precise location in Eastern Africa still remained an ongoing area of scholarly debate. Chami noted that Punt was referred to as "God's Land" from which Egyptian religious deities, Osiris and Isis were described to originate in the land of the south, yet observed that Egyptian trading missions had historically been perceived to trigger cultural diffusion and domestication throughout wider Africa.

=== Tutankhamun ===
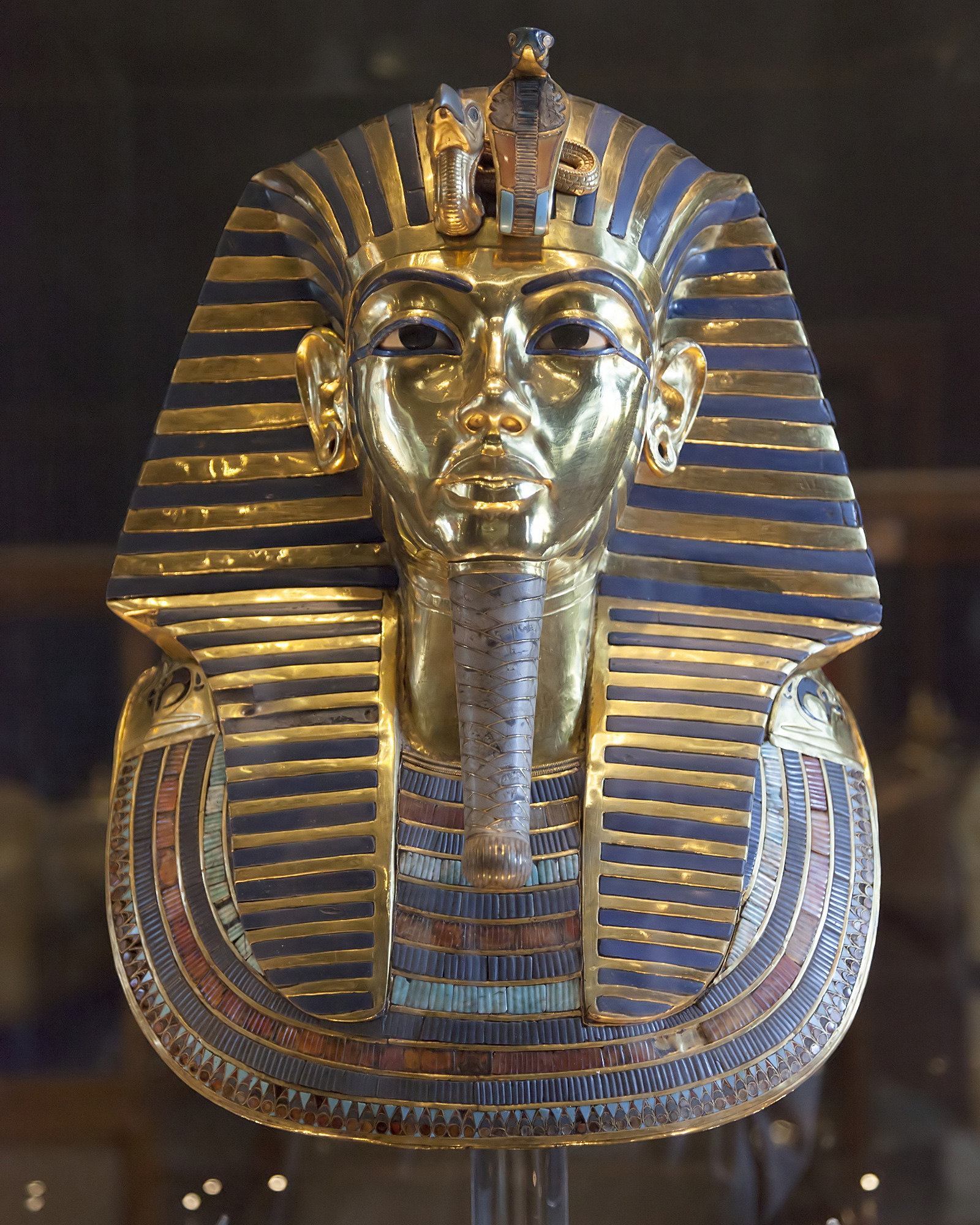
Mask of Tutankhamun

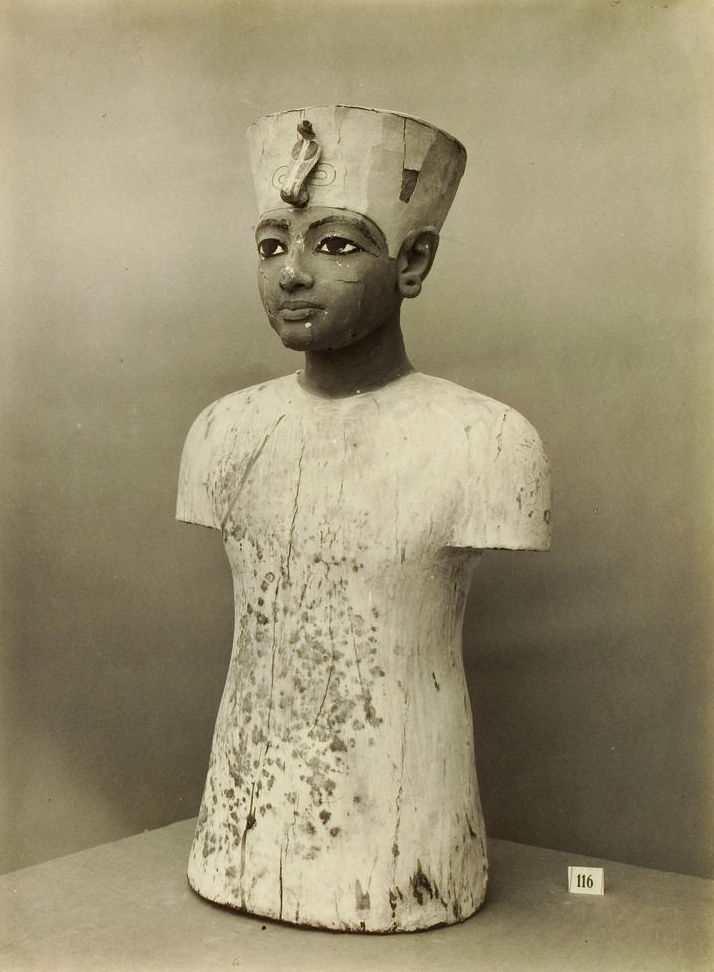
A painted, wooden figure of Tutankhamun found in his royal tomb

Several scholars have claimed that Tutankhamun was black, and have protested that attempted reconstructions of Tutankhamun's facial features (as depicted on the cover of National Geographic magazine) have represented the king as "too white". Among these writers was Chancellor Williams, who argued that King Tutankhamun, his parents, and grandparents were black.

Forensic artists and physical anthropologists from Egypt, France, and the United States independently created busts of Tutankhamun, using a CT-scan of the skull. Biological anthropologist Susan Anton, the leader of the American team, said the race of the skull was "hard to call". She stated that the shape of the cranial cavity indicated an African, while the nose opening suggested narrow nostrils, which is usually considered to be a European characteristic. The skull was thus concluded to be that of a North African. Other experts have argued that neither skull shapes nor nasal openings are a reliable indication of race.

Although modern technology can reconstruct Tutankhamun's facial structure with a high degree of accuracy, based on CT data from his mummy, determining his skin tone and eye color is impossible. The clay model was therefore given a coloring, which, according to the artist, was based on an "average shade of modern Egyptians".

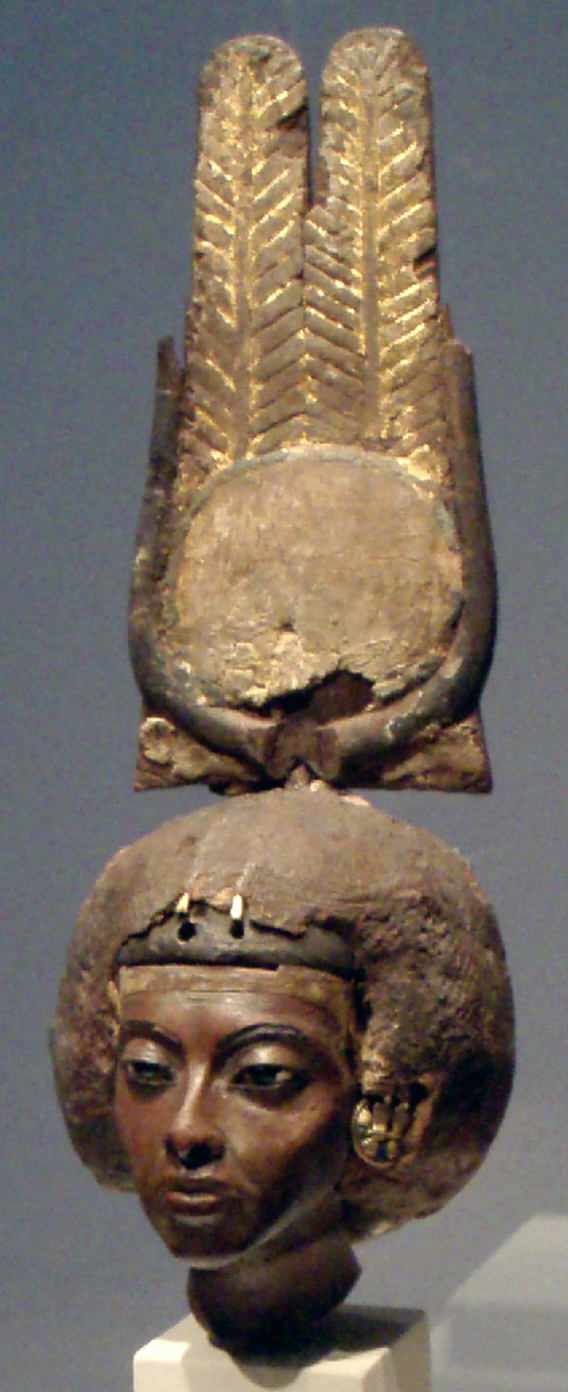
Tiye, grandmother of Tutankhamun

Terry Garcia, National Geographic's executive vice president for mission programs, said, in response to some of those protesting against the Tutankhamun reconstruction:

The big variable is skin tone. North Africans, we know today, had a range of skin tones, from light to dark. In this case, we selected a medium skin tone, and we say, quite up front, 'This is midrange.' We will never know for sure what his exact skin tone was or the color of his eyes with 100% certainty.... Maybe in the future, people will come to a different conclusion.

When pressed on the issue by American activists in September 2007, the Secretary General of the Egyptian Supreme Council of Antiquities, Zahi Hawass stated "Tutankhamun was not black."

In a November 2007 publication of Ancient Egypt magazine, Hawass asserted that none of the facial reconstructions resemble Tut and that, in his opinion, the most accurate representation of the boy king is the mask from his tomb. In 2002, Atlantic Productions commissioned a facial reconstruction of Tutankhamun for a Channel 5 documentary, utilizing X-rays from the 1960s to create a virtual skull and a physical replica.

Stuart Tyson Smith, Egyptologist and professor of anthropology at University of California, Santa Barbara, in 2008 expressed criticism of the forensic reconstruction in a journal review, noting that "Tutankhamun's face" was "very light-skinned" which reflected a "bias" among media outlets. He further added that "Egyptologists have been strangely reluctant to admit that the ancient Egyptians were rather dark-skinned Africans, especially the farther south one goes".

In 2011, the genomics company iGENEA launched a Tutankhamun DNA project based on genetic markers that it indicated it had culled from a Discovery Channel special on the pharaoh. According to the firm, the microsatellite data suggested that Tutankhamun belonged to the haplogroup R1b1a2, the most common paternal clade among males in Western Europe. Carsten Pusch and Albert Zink, who led the unit that had extracted Tutankhamun's DNA, chided iGENEA for not liaising with them before establishing the project. After examining the footage, they also concluded that the methodology the company used was unscientific with Putsch calling them "simply impossible".

A 2020 DNA study by Gad, Hawass et al., analysed mitochondrial and Y-chromosomal haplogroups from Tutankhamun's family members of the 18th Dynasty, using comprehensive control procedures to ensure quality results. They found that the Y-chromosome haplogroup of the family was R1b, which originated in Europe and which today makes up 50–90% of the genetic pool of modern western Europeans. The mitochondrial haplogroup was K, which is most likely also part of a Near Eastern lineage. The profiles for Tutankhamun and Amenhotep III were incomplete and the analysis produced differing probability figures despite having concordant allele results.

Because the relationships of these two mummies with the KV55 mummy had previously been confirmed in an earlier study, the haplogroup prediction of both mummies could be derived from the full profile of the KV55 data. The 20th Dynasty pair of Ramesses III and his son were found to have the haplogroup E1b1a, which has its highest frequencies in modern populations from West Africa and Central Africa, but which is rare among North Africans and nearly absent in East Africa. Genetic analysis indicated the following haplogroups:

- Amenhotep III YDNA R1b / mtDNA H2b
- Tutankhamun YDNA R1b / mtDNA K
- Akhenaten YDNA R1b / mtDNA K
- Tiye mtDNA K
- Yuya G2a / mtDNA K
- Thuya mtDNA K

In 2010 Hawass et al. undertook detailed anthropological, radiological, and genetic studies as part of the King Tutankhamun Family Project. The objectives included attempting to determine familial relationships among 11 royal mummies of the New Kingdom, as well to research for pathological features including potential inherited disorders and infectious diseases. In 2022, S.O.Y. Keita analysed 8 Short Tandem loci (STR) data published as part of these studies by Hawass et al., using an algorithm that only has three choices: Eurasians, sub-Saharan Africans, and East Asians. Using these three options, Keita concluded that the majority of the samples, which included the genetic remains of Tutankhamun, showed a population "affinity with "sub-Saharan" Africans in one affinity analysis". However, Keita cautioned that this does not mean that the royal mummies "lacked other affiliations" which he argued had been obscured in typological thinking. Keita further added that different "data and algorithms might give different results" which reflects the complexity of biological heritage and the associated interpretation.

According to historian William Stiebling and archaeologist Susan N. Helft, conflicting DNA analysis conducted by different research teams on ancient Egyptians such as the Amarna royal mummies, which included the remains of Tutankhamun, has led to a lack of consensus on the genetic makeup of the ancient Egyptians and their geographic origins.

In 2025, biochemist Jean-Philippe Gourdine reviewed genetic data on the Ancient Egyptian populations in the international scholarly publication, General History of Africa Volume IX. Expanding on a previous STR analysis, performed on the Amarna mummies which included Tutankhamun, Gourdine stated the analysis had found “that they had strong affinities with current sub-Saharan populations: 41 per cent to 93.9 per cent for sub-Saharan Africa, compared to 4.6 per cent to 41 per cent for Eurasia and 0.3 per cent to 16 per cent for Asia (Gourdine, 2018).” He also referenced comparable analysis conducted by DNA Tribes, which specialized in genetic genealogy and had large datasets, with the latter having identified strong affinities between the Amarna royal mummies and Sub-Saharan African populations.

=== Cleopatra ===
The race and skin color of Cleopatra VII, the last active Hellenistic ruler of the Macedonian Greek Ptolemaic dynasty of Egypt, established in 323 BC, has also caused some debate, although generally not in scholarly sources. For example, the article "Was Cleopatra Black?" was published in Ebony magazine in 2012, and an article about Afrocentrism from the St. Louis Post-Dispatch mentions the question, too. Mary Lefkowitz, Professor Emerita of Classical Studies at Wellesley College, traces the main origins of the black Cleopatra claim to the 1946 book by J. A. Rogers called World's Great Men of Color, although noting that the idea of Cleopatra as black goes back to at least the 19th century. The black Cleopatra claim was further revived in an essay by afrocentrist John Henrik Clarke, chair of African history at Hunter College, entitled "African Warrior Queens." Lefkowitz refutes Rogers' and Clarke's hypotheses, on various scholarly grounds.

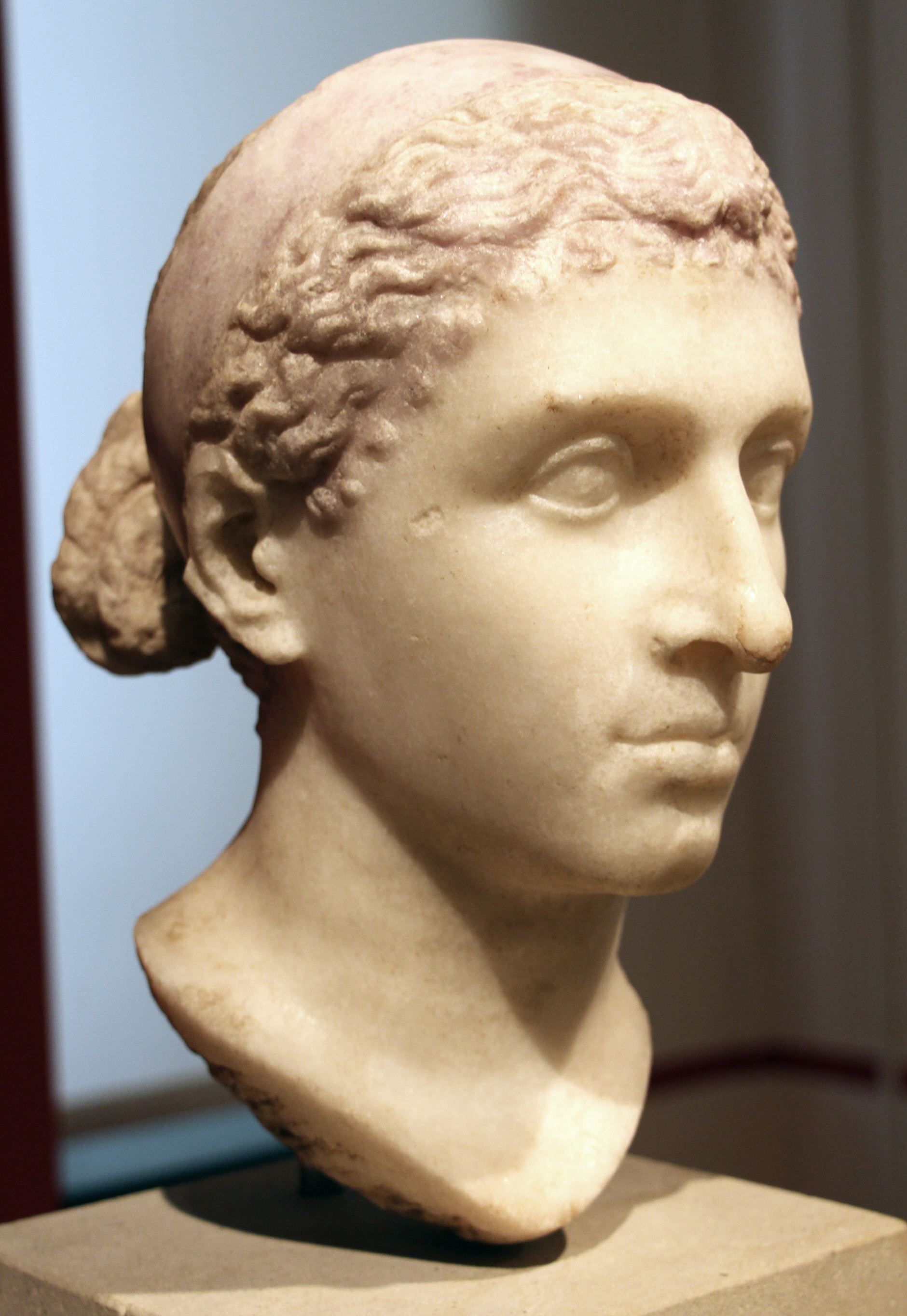
The Berlin Cleopatra, now in the Altes Museum, 1st century BC

Scholars identify Cleopatra as essentially of Greek ancestry with some Persian and Sogdian Iranian ancestry, based on the fact that her Macedonian Greek family (the Ptolemaic dynasty) had intermingled with the Seleucid aristocracy of the time.

Michael Grant states that Cleopatra probably had not a drop of Egyptian blood and that she "would have described herself as Greek." To the contrary, Joyce Tyldesley highlights that while "Ptolemies were culturally Hellenistic Macedonians", they also "believed themselves to be a valid Egyptian dynasty" and that "Cleopatra defined herself as an Egyptian queen" accepted as such by her subjects and contemporaries. She also admits the possibility that Cleopatra had an Egyptian mother, potentially explaining the Queen's proficiency in Egyptian language. However, Tyldesley notes that even if this theory is true, it might not be helpful in determination of Cleopatra's racial heritage and her phenotype, as population of Egypt during Ptolemaic times had "diverse range of racial characteristics, with red-haded, light-skinned Egyptians living alongside curly haired, darker-skinned neighbours".

Duane W. Roller notes that "there is absolutely no evidence" that Cleopatra was racially black African as claimed by what he dismisses as generally not "credible scholarly sources," although he speculates Cleopatra may have been one-fourth Egyptian. Part of Roller's argument rests on a speculated earlier marriage between Psenptais II and a certain "Berenice", once argued to possibly be a daughter of Ptolemy VIII. However, this speculation was refuted by Egyptologist Wendy Cheshire.

Cleopatra's official coinage (which she would have approved) and the three portrait busts of her which are considered authentic by scholars, all match each other, and they portray Cleopatra as a Greek woman. Polo writes that Cleopatra's coinage presents her image with certainty, and asserts that the sculpted portrait of the "Berlin Cleopatra" head is confirmed as having a similar profile. Similar to the Berlin Cleopatra, other Roman sculpted portraits of Cleopatra include diadem-wearing marble heads now located in the Vatican Museums and Archaeological Museum of Cherchell, although the latter may instead be a depiction of her daughter Cleopatra Selene II. Aside from Hellenistic art, native Egyptian artworks of Cleopatra include the Bust of Cleopatra in the Royal Ontario Museum, as well as stone-carved reliefs of the Temple of Hathor in the Dendera Temple complex in Egypt depicting Cleopatra and Caesarion as ruling pharaohs providing offerings to Egyptian deities. In his Kleopatra und die Caesaren (2006), Bernard Andreae contends that this Egyptian basalt statue is like other idealized Egyptian portraits of the queen, and does not contain realistic facial features and hence adds little to the knowledge of Cleopatra's appearance.

In 2009, a BBC documentary speculated that Cleopatra might have been part North African. This was based largely on the claims of Hilke Thür of the Austrian Academy of Sciences, who in the 1990s had examined a headless skeleton of a female child in a 20 BC tomb in Ephesus (modern Turkey), together with the old notes and photographs of the now-missing skull. Thür hypothesized the body as that of Arsinoe, half-sister to Cleopatra. Arsinoe and Cleopatra shared the same father (Ptolemy XII Auletes) but may have had different mothers, with Thür claiming the alleged African ancestry came from the skeleton's mother.

Furthermore, craniometry as used by Thür to determine race is based in scientific racism that is now generally considered a pseudoscience that supported "exploitation of groups of people" to "perpetuate racial oppression" and "distorted future views of the biological basis of race." When a DNA test attempted to determine the identity of the child, it was impossible to get an accurate reading since the bones had been handled too many times, and the skull had been lost in Germany during World War II. Numerous studies have shown that cranial variation has a low correlation with race, and rather that cranial variation was strongly correlated with climate variables. (Note: In 1912, Franz Boas argued that cranial shape was heavily influenced by environmental factors and could change within a few generations under differing conditions, thereby making the cephalic index an unreliable indicator of inherited influences such as ethnicity. Gravlee, Bernard and Leonard (2003), Beals, Smith, and Dodd (1984) and Williams and Armelagos (2005) similarly posited that "race" and cranial variation had low correlations, and proposed that cranial variation was instead strongly correlated with climate variables. Brace (1993) differentiated adaptive cranial traits from non-adaptive cranial traits, asserting that only the non-adaptive cranial traits served as reliable indicators of genetic relatedness between populations. This was further corroborated in studies by von Cramon-Taubadel (2008, 2009a, 2011). Clement and Ranson (1998) estimated that cranial analysis yields a 77%-95% rate of accuracy in determining the racial origins of human skeletal remains. FORDISC, an interactive discriminant functions program, is used by forensic anthropologists to assist in the creation of a decedent's biological profile when only parts of the cranium are available. The software uses discriminant function analysis to sort individuals into specific groups that are defined by certain criteria, by comparing potential profiles to data contained in a database of skeletal measurements of modern humans. However a 2009 study found that even in favourable circumstances, FORDISC 3.0 can be expected to classify no more than 1 percent of specimens with confidence." In 2012, research presented at the 81st Annual Meeting of the American Association of Physical Anthropologists concluded that ForDisc ancestry determination was not always consistent, that the program does not perform to expectations and that it should be used with caution.) Mary Beard states that the age of the skeleton is too young to be that of Arsinoe (the bones said to be that of a 15–18-year-old child, with Arsinoe being around her mid twenties at her death).

In 2025, it was definitively proven that the skeleton does not belong to Arsinoe IV, when genetic research was able to assess that the skeleton belongs to a teenage male.

The 2023 Netflix documentary series Queen Cleopatra, which appears to depict Cleopatra as black, spurred a lawsuit in Egypt claiming that the documentary was distorting the reality in order to promote Afrocentrism, and that Netflix's programs were not in line with Egyptian or Islamic values. Similarly, an article published by The Telegraph criticized the Netflix documentary, stating that "Cleopatra was Greek, not a tool in Netflix's war on real history". Classics scholar Rebecca Futo Kennedy contends that discussing whether someone was “black” or “white” is anachronistic, and that asking this question says "more about modern political investments than attempting to understand antiquity on its own terms."

=== Great Sphinx of Giza ===
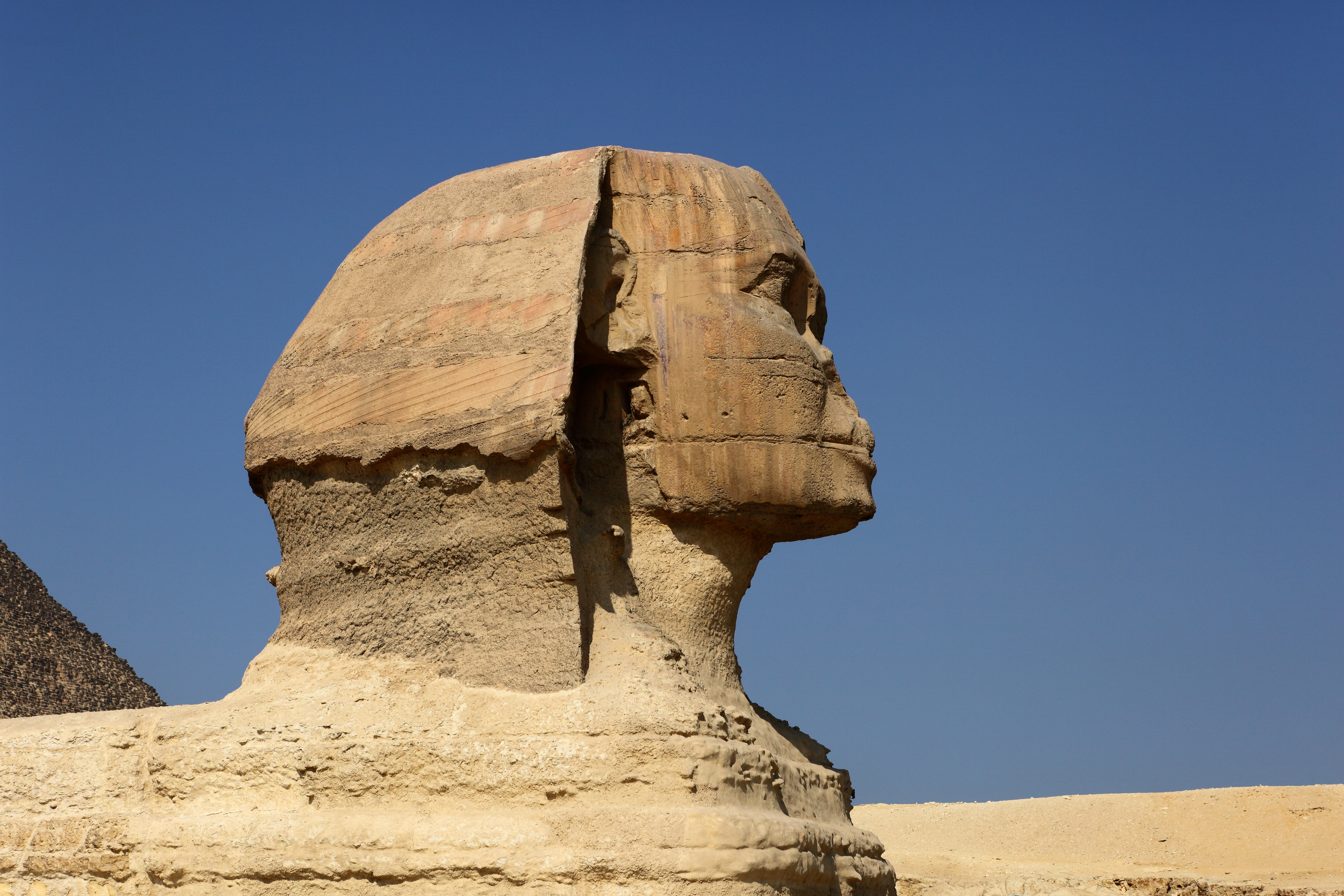
The Sphinx in profile in 2010

The identity of the model for the Great Sphinx of Giza is unknown. Most experts believe that the face of the Sphinx represents the likeness of the Pharaoh Khafra, although a few Egyptologists and interested amateurs have proposed different hypotheses.

An early description of the Sphinx, "typically negro in all its features", is recorded in the travel notes of a French scholar, Volney, who visited Egypt between 1783 and 1785 along with French novelist Gustave Flaubert. A similar description was given in the "well-known book" by Vivant Denon, where he described the sphinx as "the character is African; but the mouth, the lips of which are thick." Following Volney, Denon, and other early writers, numerous Afrocentric scholars, such as Du Bois, Diop and Asante have characterized the face of the Sphinx as Black, or "Negroid".

American geologist Robert M. Schoch has written that the "Sphinx has a distinctive African, Nubian, or Negroid aspect which is lacking in the face of Khafre", but he was described by others such as Ronald H. Fritze and Mark Lehner of being a "pseudoscientific writer". David S. Anderson writes in Lost City, Found Pyramid: Understanding Alternative Archaeologies and Pseudoscientific Practices that Van Sertima's claim that "the sphinx was a portrait statue of the black pharaoh Khafre" is a form of "pseudoarchaeology" not supported by evidence. He compares it to the claim that Olmec colossal heads had "African origins", which is not taken seriously by Mesoamerican scholars such as Richard Diehl and Ann Cyphers.

=== Kemet (km.t) (Egypt) ===
km in Egyptian hieroglyphs
km biliteral	kmt (place)	kmt (people)
km	km t O49	km t A1 B1 Z3

The hieroglyph km in ancient Egyptian means the color black and in some cases "completion" or "conclusion". In Gardiner's Sign List, it is categorized as I6 and its phonetic representation is "km." The Wörterbuch der ägyptischen Sprache ("Dictionary of the Egyptian Language") identifies at least 24 compound forms of km, often describing black objects such as stone, metal, wood, hair, eyes, animals, and occasionally even being linked to personal names as well as descriptions of 'coming to an end', terminating, or "an item of completion". Why the km hieroglyph looks the way it does is unknown. Gardiner's Sign List describes it as resembling "a piece of crocodile-skin with spines." It falls under section I, which includes symbols representing "amphibious animals, reptiles, etc." This section also contains other hieroglyphs, such as I5, which is the symbol for a crocodile. Another common theory is that the km hieroglyph depicts a piece of charcoal.

Most scholars hold that kmt means "the black land" or "the black place", and that this is a reference to the fertile black soil that was washed down from Central Africa by the annual Nile inundation. By contrast the barren desert outside the narrow confines of the Nile watercourse was called dšrt (conventionally pronounced deshret) or "the red land". Raymond Faulkner's Concise Dictionary of Middle Egyptian translates kmt into "Egyptians", Gardiner translates it as "the Black Land, Egypt".' At the UNESCO Symposium in 1974, French Egyptologist Serge Sauneron stated that in Egyptian km meant 'black', the masculine plural was Kmu (Kemou) and the feminine plural Kmnt and that the form Kmtyw could mean 'those of Kmt', 'the inhabitants of Kmt' ('the black country'). It was a derived adjective (nisba) derived from a geographical term which had become a proper name; it was not necessarily 'felt' in its original meaning (cf. Frank, France, French). To indicate 'black people', the Egyptians would have said Kmt or Kmu, not Kmtyw, they never used this adjective to designate the black people of the African hinterland whom they knew about from the time of the New Kingdom onwards and, in general, nor did they use names of colours to categorize people.

In the 11th-12th dynasty Ancient Egypt came to be called by the Egyptians Kemet ( 'km.t' ) (kemet) a derivative of km and also Ta-meri (“The Beloved Land”) (tꜣ-mrj). km.t is a feminine derivative of km in the ancient Egyptian language.

Cheikh Anta Diop, a Senegalese scholar and author, argued that the ancient Egyptians referred to themselves using a term that, when translated literally, meant "the negroes". Diop also said km, the etymological root of other words such as Kam or Ham refer to Black people in Hebrew tradition.

A review of David Goldenberg's The Curse of Ham: Race and Slavery in Early Judaism, Christianity and Islam states that Goldenberg "argues persuasively that the biblical name Ham bears no relationship at all to the notion of blackness and as of now is of unknown etymology". Diop, William Leo Hansberry, and Aboubacry Moussa Lam have argued that kmt was derived from the skin color of the Nile valley people, which Diop claimed was black. The claim that the ancient Egyptians had black skin has become a cornerstone of Afrocentric historiography.

At the UNESCO Symposium in 1974, Diop and Egyptologist/ linguist Théophile Obenga maintained that ancient Egypt was a Black African civilization to an international audience of scholars and experts. stating ""Egyptian can not be isolated from its African context and Semitic did not account for its birth; it was therefore legitimate to find relatives or cousins for it in Africa"

=== Ancient Egyptian art ===
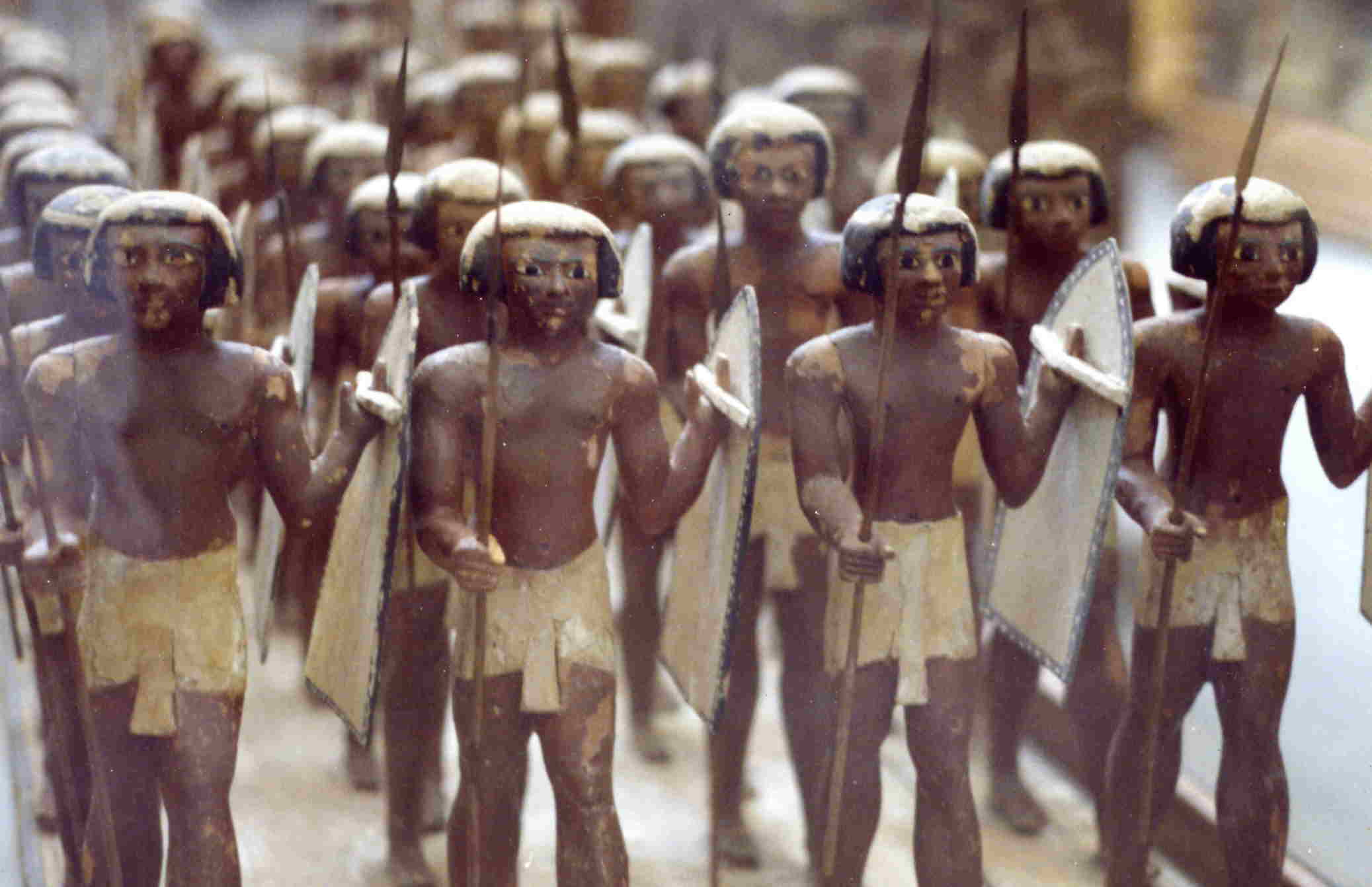
11th Dynasty model of Egyptian soldiers from the tomb of Mesehti, Upper Egypt

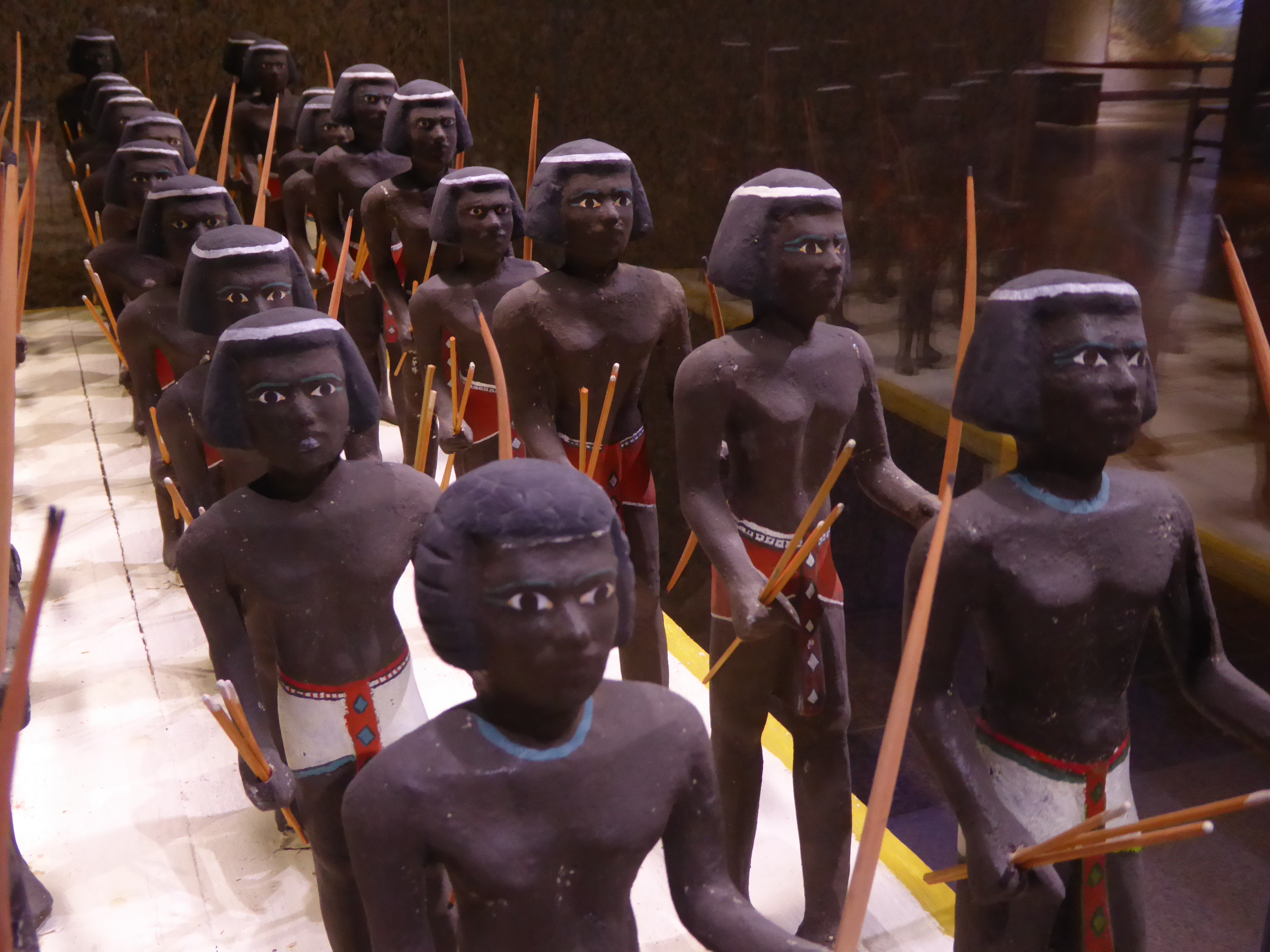
11th Dynasty model of Nubian archers from a tomb in Asyut, Upper Egypt

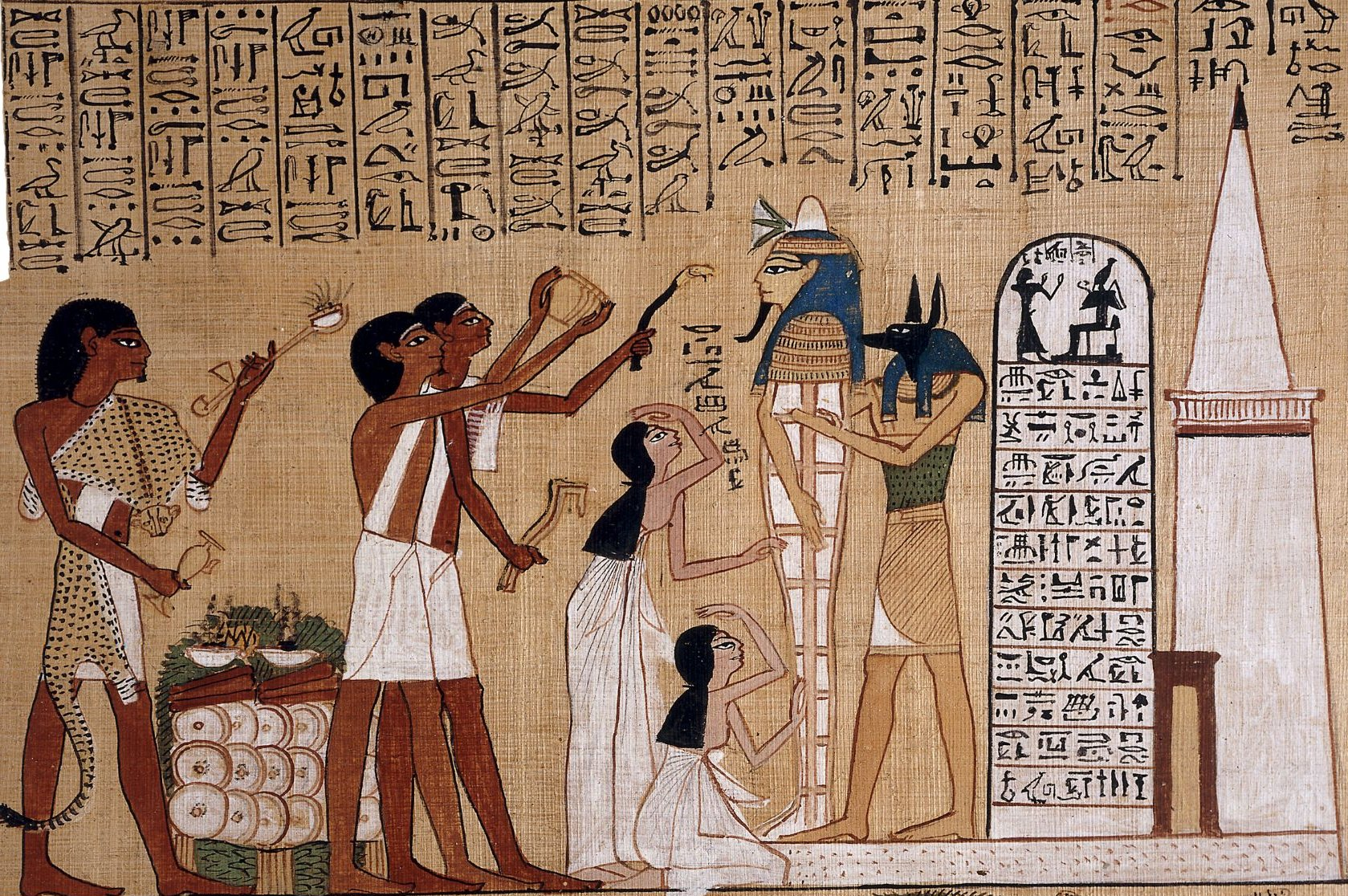
Painting of the opening of the mouth ceremony being performed on a mummy before the tomb, Anubis attending the mummy of the deceased.

Ancient Egyptian tombs and temples contained thousands of paintings, sculptures, and written works, which reveal a great deal about the people of that time. However, their depictions of themselves in their surviving art and artifacts are rendered in sometimes symbolic, rather than realistic, pigments. As a result, ancient Egyptian artifacts provide sometimes conflicting and inconclusive evidence of the ethnicity of the people who lived in Egypt during dynastic times.

In their own art, "Egyptians are often represented in a color that is officially called dark red", according to Diop. Arguing against other theories, Diop quotes Champollion-Figeac, who states, "one distinguishes on Egyptian monuments several species of blacks, differing...with respect to complexion, which makes Negroes black or copper-colored." Regarding an expedition by King Sesostris, Cherubini states the following concerning captured southern Africans, "except for the panther skin about their loins, are distinguished by their color, some entirely black, others dark brown.

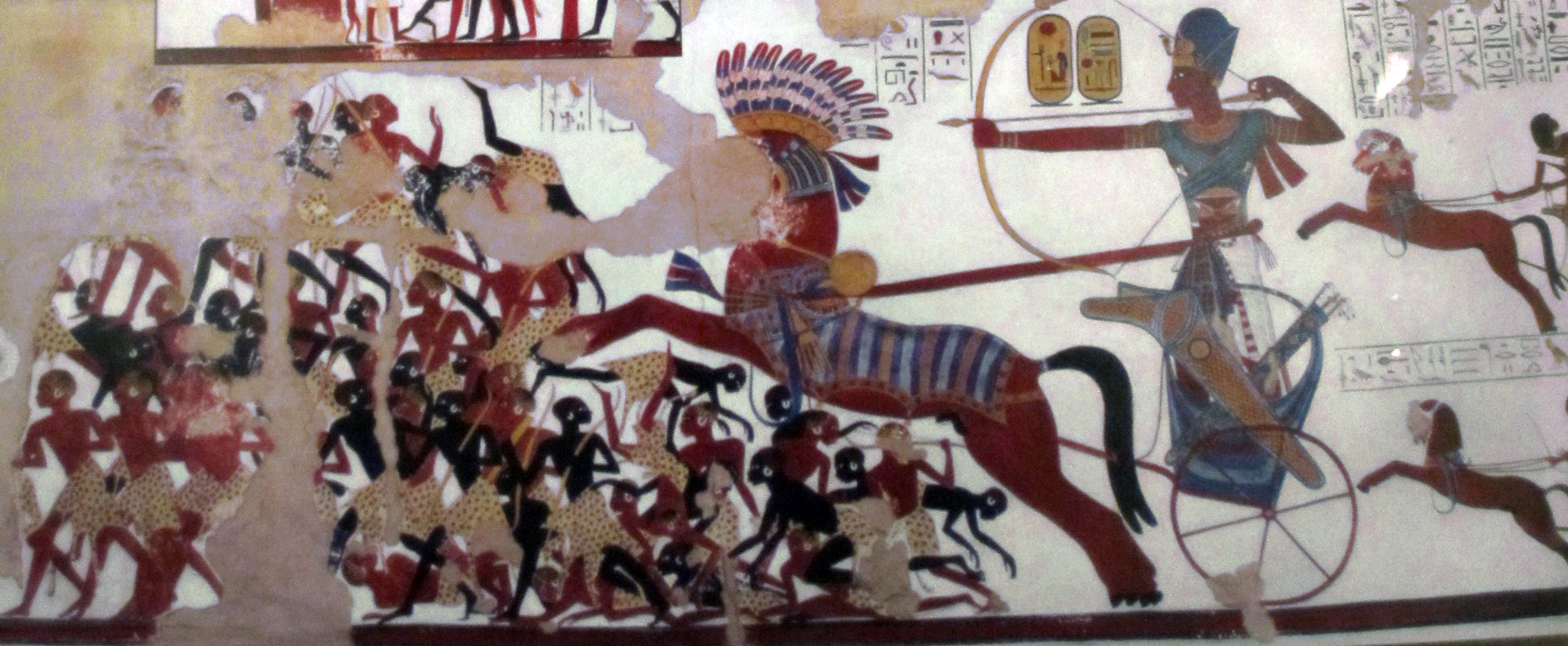
Ramesses II in his war chariot charging into battle against the Nubians. New Kingdom reliefs as seen in Rameses II temple, Beit el-Wali, represented Nubians with dark reddish brown and jet black skin tones.

University of Chicago scholars assert that Nubians are generally depicted with black paint, but the skin pigment used in Egyptian paintings to refer to Nubians can range "from dark red to brown to black". This can be observed in paintings from the tomb of the Egyptian Huy, as well as Ramses II's temple at Beit el-Wali. Also, Snowden indicates that Romans had accurate knowledge of "negroes of a red, copper-colored complexion ... among African tribes".

Conversely, in 2003 Najovits wrote that "Egyptian art depicted Egyptians on the one hand and Nubians and other blacks on the other hand with distinctly different ethnic characteristics and depicted this abundantly and often aggressively. The Egyptians accurately, arrogantly and aggressively made national and ethnic distinctions from a very early date in their art and literature." He continues, "There is an extraordinary abundance of Egyptian works of art which clearly depicted sharply contrasted reddish-brown Egyptians and black Nubians."

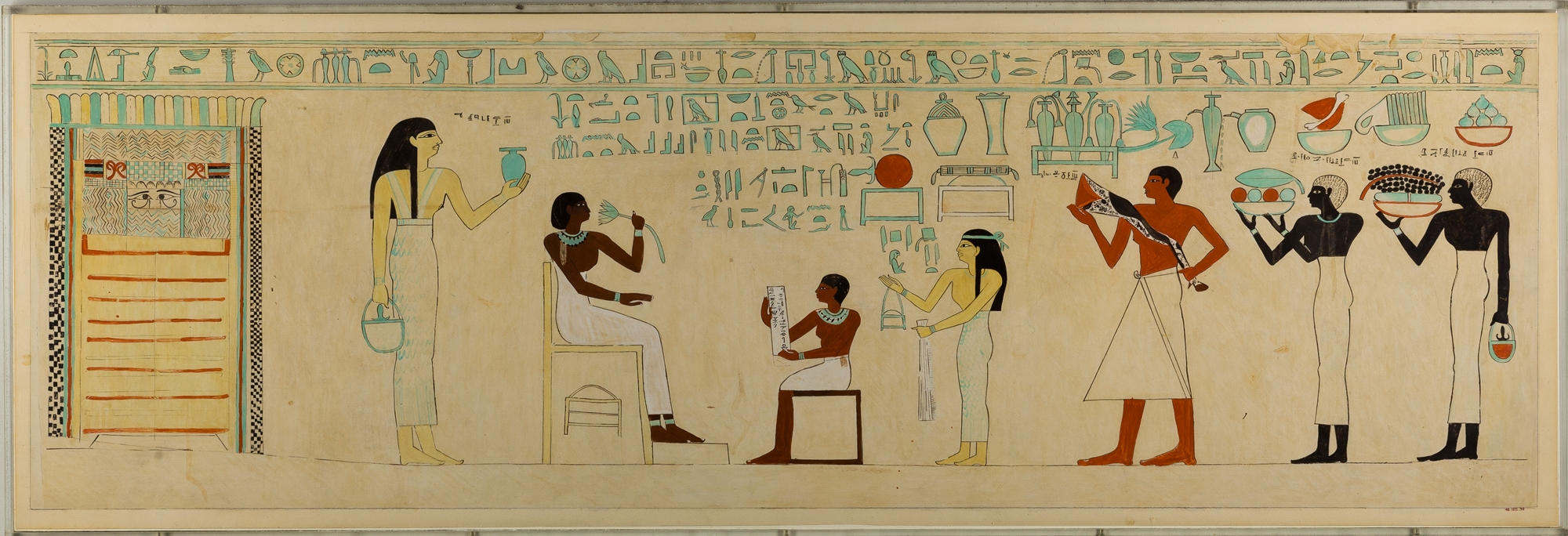
Painting on the sarcophagus of Queen Ashayet, showing the queen with both Egyptian and Nubian servants

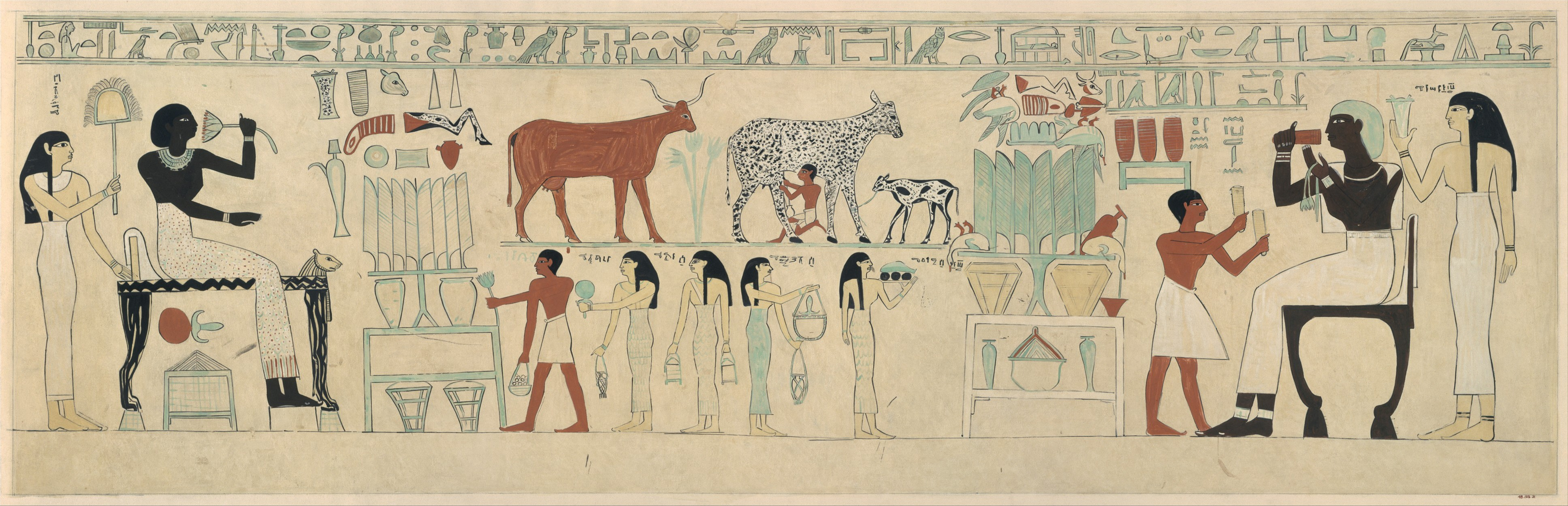
Inner back side of the sarcophagus of Ashayet, a Nubian wife of Mentuhotep II in the 11th Dynasty, depicting her with male and female Egyptian servants (facsimile by Charles K. Wilkinson)

In 2003, David O'Connor and Andrew Reid remarked that "Puntite and Egyptian males are assigned similarly reddish skins, but Nubians typically have darker one, and Libyans at most periods have light coloured, yellowish skin. Initially, Nubians and Puntities may have been shown as fairly similar in appearance and dress (short linen kilts), but by ca 1400 BC they are distinctly different".

Barbara Mertz in 2011 wrote in Red Land, Black Land: Daily Life in Ancient Egypt: "The concept of race would have been totally alien to them [Ancient Egyptians] ...The skin color that painters usually used for men is a reddish brown. Women were depicted as lighter in complexion, perhaps because they didn't spend so much time out of doors. Some individuals are shown with black skins. I cannot recall a single example of the words "black," "brown," or "white" being used in an Egyptian text to describe a person." She gives the example of one of Thutmose III's "sole companions", who was Nubian or Kushite. In his funerary scroll, he is shown with dark brown skin instead of the conventional reddish brown used for Egyptians.

==== "Table of Nations" controversy in scenes from the Book of Gates ====
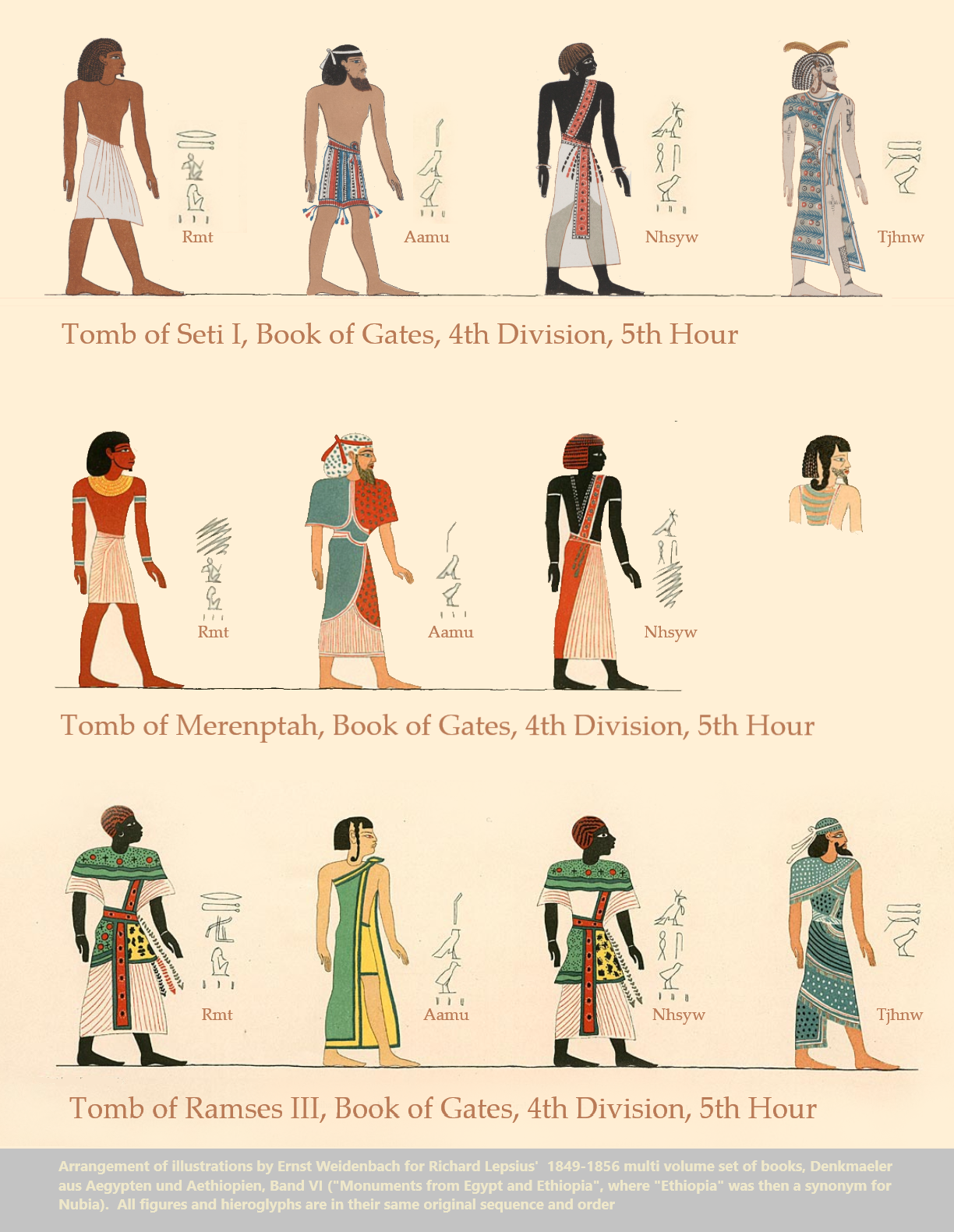
From three different tombs: Illustration of figures from the 4th Division of the 5th Hour in at 1) Tomb of Seti I 2) Tomb of Merenptah and 3)Tomb of Ramesses III

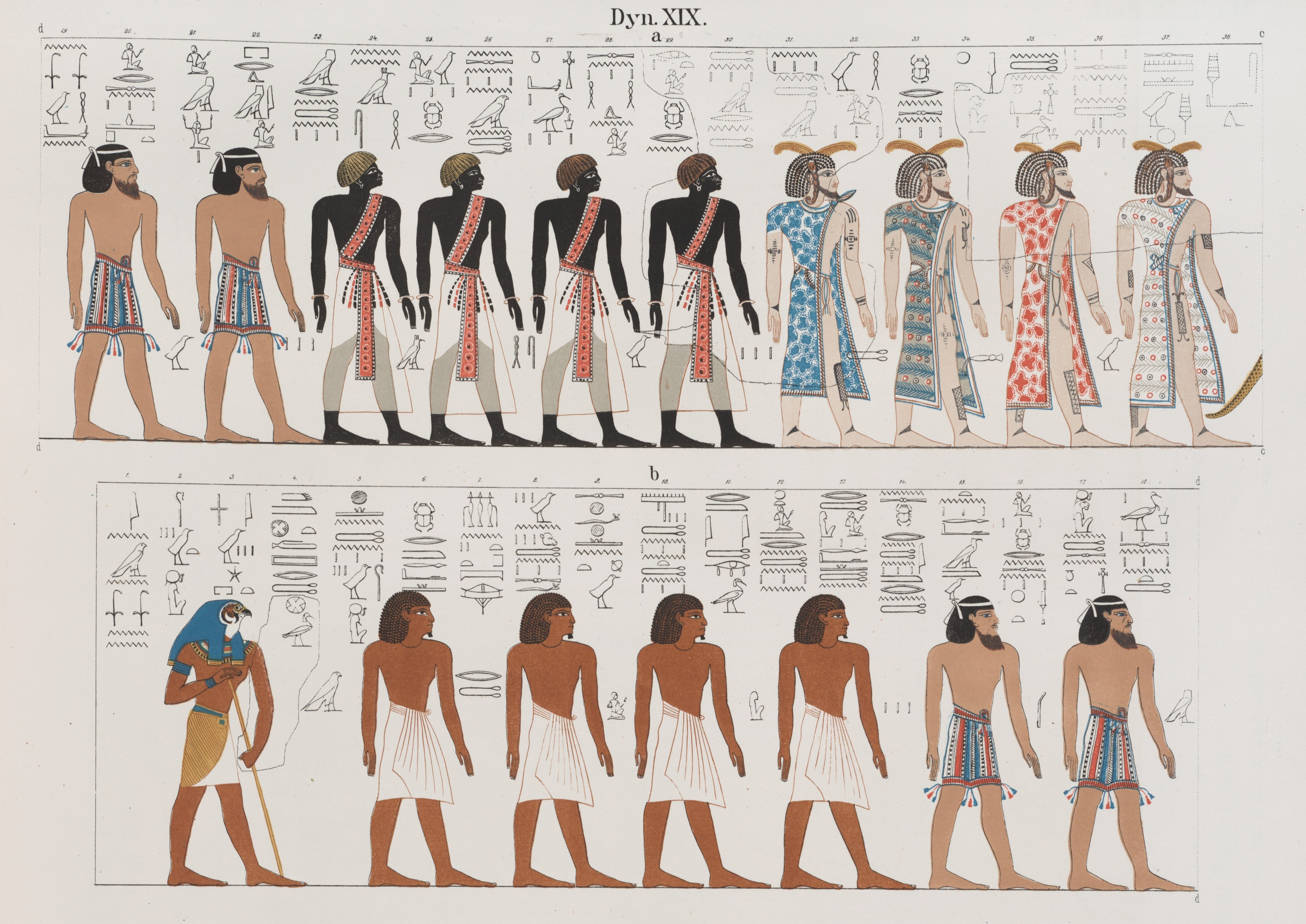
The "Table of Nations", from Lepsius: First row, left to right: "Aamu" (Asiatics), "Nehesu" (Nubians), and "Themehu" (Libyans); second row: a deity, "Reth" (Egyptians), "Aamu" (Asiatics)

Manu Ampim, a professor at Merritt College specializing in African and African American history and culture, claims in the book Modern Fraud: The Forged Ancient Egyptian Statues of Ra-Hotep and Nofret, that many ancient Egyptian statues and artworks are modern frauds that have been created specifically to hide the "fact" that the ancient Egyptians were black, while authentic artworks that demonstrate black characteristics are systematically defaced or even "modified". Ampim repeatedly makes the accusation that the Egyptian authorities are systematically destroying evidence that "proves" that the ancient Egyptians were black, under the guise of renovating and conserving the applicable temples and structures. He further accuses "European" scholars of wittingly participating in and abetting this process.

Ampim has a specific concern about a wall painting depicting in a scene from the Book of Gates identified as the 4th Division, 5th Hour. an Egyptian funerary text in the Tomb of Ramesses III (KV11). The Book of Gates is a funerary text that appears in a number of New Kingdom tombs, and they were usually provided for the guidance of the soul of the deceased. The Egyptians did not assign a name to this text; it was later termed 'Livre des Portes' (Book of Gates) by the French Egyptologist Gaston Maspero. This particular scene (4th division, 5th hour) was also not titled by the Egyptians. It depicts Egyptians and three other ethnic groups being led to the afterlife by Horus. Some, in modern times call it the "Table of Nations" a phrase sometimes used by biblical scholars referring to the unrelated genealogical record in Genesis 10. Others in modern times, such as E.A. Wallis Budge in 1906), have called the scene "The Four Races of Men" Budge's interpretation of the Egyptian text describing each figure: "The first are RETH, the second are AAMU, the third are NEHESU, and the fourth are THEMEHU. The RETH are Egyptians, the AAMU are dwellers in the deserts to the east and north-east of Egypt, the NEHESU are the black races, and the THEMEHU are the fair-skinned Libyans."

The archaeologist Karl Richard Lepsius documented many ancient Egyptian tomb paintings in his work Denkmäler aus Aegypten und Aethiopien. In 1913, after the death of Lepsius, an updated reprint of the work was produced, edited by Kurt Sethe. This printing included an additional section, called the "Ergänzungsband" in German, which incorporated many illustrations that did not appear in Lepsius' original work. One of them, plate 48, illustrated one example of each of the four "nations" as depicted in KV11, and shows the "Egyptian nation" and the "Nubian nation" as identical to each other in skin color and dress. Ampim has declared that plate 48 is a true reflection of the original painting, and that it "proves" that the ancient Egyptians were identical in appearance to the Nubians, even though he admits no other examples of this "Table of Nations" scene in the Book of Gates in other tombs where it appears show this similarity. Another inconsistency with other tombs in the depiction of the scene in the Tomb of Ramesses III (KV11) that Ampim does not mention is while the Asiatic and Libyan are in consistent 2nd and 4th position at both Seti I and Merenptah's tombs the figure types switch position at the tomb of Ramesses III while the hieroglyphs do not. At Seti I and Merenptah tombs the Asiatic in the second position is depicted as is typical in much other art of the period, a bearded figure with a cloth headband with two excess pieces of the headband hanging down. Additionally at these two tombs, Seti and Merenptah, a Libyan is at the end of the row, at the 4th position and is depicted with typical Libyan features of the period, a side lock of hair and a long gown-like garment that is worn somewhat openly and with one or both shoulders exposed. However, while all the hieroglyphs in all three tombs remain in the same position left to right, at Ramesses III, these two figures Asiatic and Libyan, have switched position in comparison to the other tombs. The figures may have been created after a separate artisan had first rendered the hieroglyphs. The only figure at Ramesses III that is in the same position as the figures at Seti I and Merenptah tombs is the Nubian in the third position. The hieroglyph position have no irregularities in type or sequence between each tomb. Ampim has further accused "Euro-American writers" of attempting to mislead the public on this issue.

The late Egyptologist Frank J. Yurco visited the tomb of Ramesses III (KV11), and in a 1996 article on the Ramesses III tomb reliefs he pointed out that the depiction of plate 48 in the Ergänzungsband section is not a correct depiction of what is actually painted on the walls of the tomb. Yurco notes, instead, that plate 48 is a "pastiche" of samples of what is on the tomb walls, arranged from Lepsius' notes after his death, and that a picture of a Nubian person has erroneously been labeled in the pastiche as an Egyptian person. Yurco points also to the much more recent photographs of Erik Hornung as a correct depiction of the actual paintings. (Erik Hornung, The Valley of the Kings: Horizon of Eternity, 1990).

Yurco later concluded that Egyptian iconography reflected "various complexions" and that "current scholarship in Egyptology, not acknowledged often by Afrocentrists, has demonstrated that the Egyptians were most closely related to Saharan Africans, culturally and linguistically, and that such Mesopotamian influence can be inferred, came through the Nile Delta town of Buto, as part of long-distance trade". He also noted that the Egyptians made distinctions between groups from Nubia, such as "Nhsy" and "Mdja" with the former group described as "darker, with frizzy hair and wore a distinctive dress". Ampim nonetheless continues to argue that plate 48 shows accurately the images that stand on the walls of KV11, and he categorically accuses both Yurco and Hornung of perpetrating a deliberate deception for the purposes of misleading the public about the true race of the ancient Egyptians.

==== Fayyum mummy portraits ====
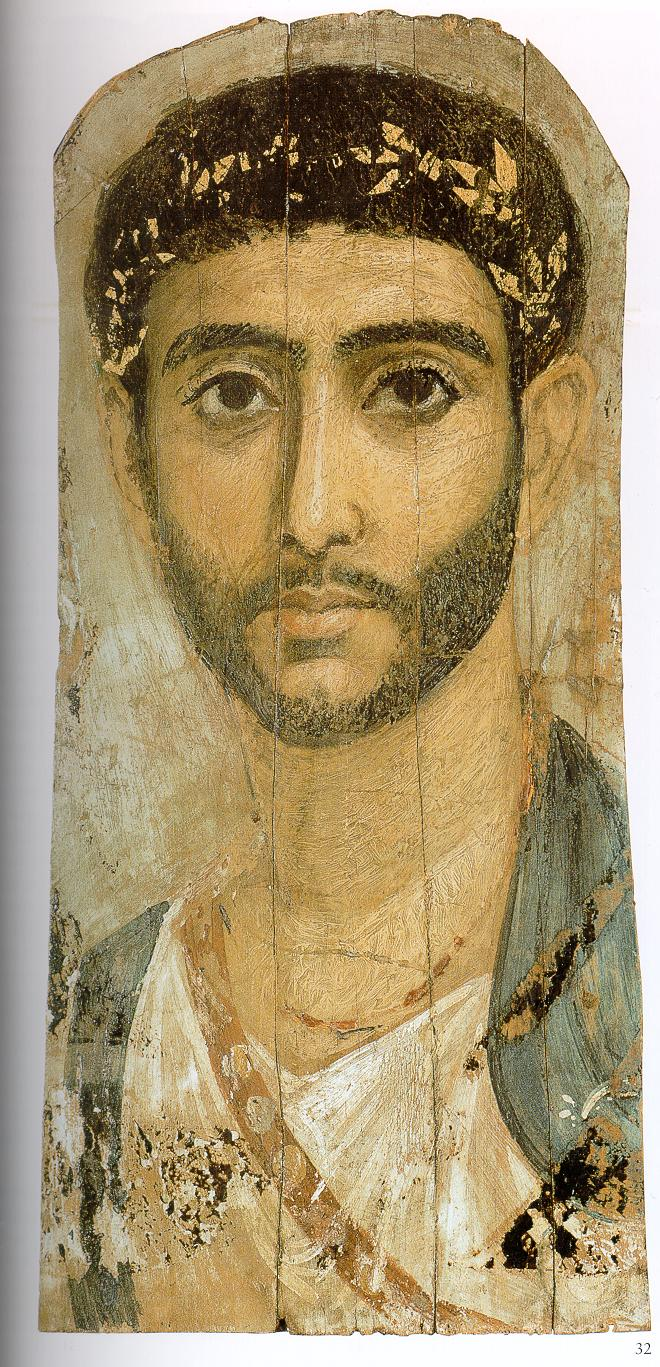
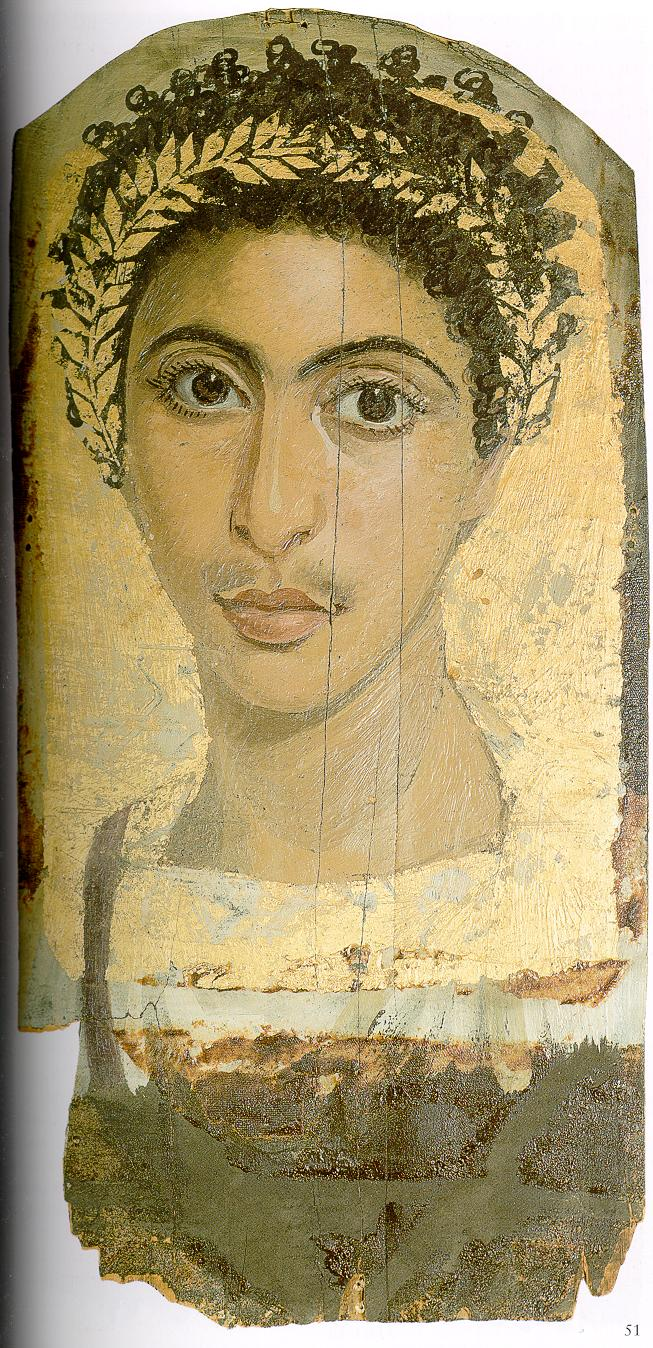
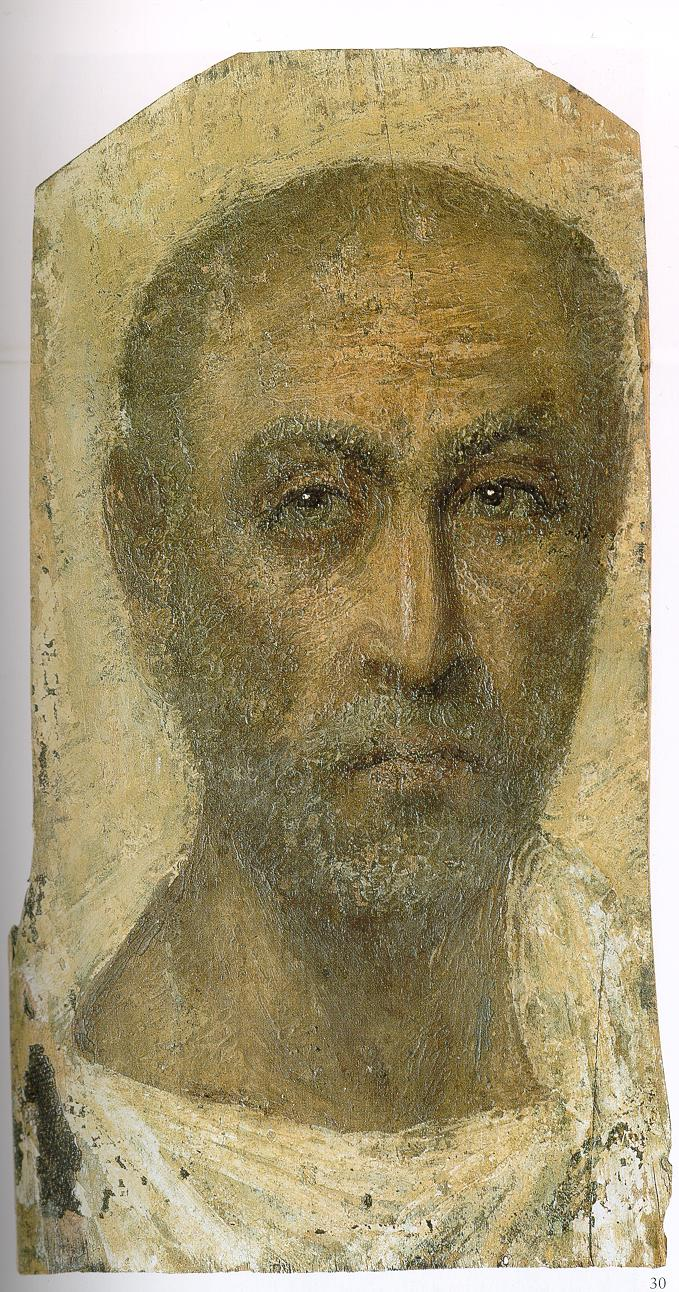
The naturalistic Fayum mummy portraits show the diversity of Egyptians in the Roman period.

The Roman era Fayum mummy portraits attached to coffins containing the latest dated mummies discovered in the Faiyum Oasis represent a population of both native Egyptians and those with mixed Greek heritage. The dental morphology of the mummies align more with the indigenous North African population than Greek or other later colonial European settlers.

==== Black queen controversy ====
The late British Africanist Basil Davidson stated "Whether the Ancient Egyptians were as black or as brown in skin color as other Africans may remain an issue of emotive dispute; probably, they were both. Their own artistic conventions painted them as pink, but pictures on their tombs show they often married queens shown as entirely black being from the south."

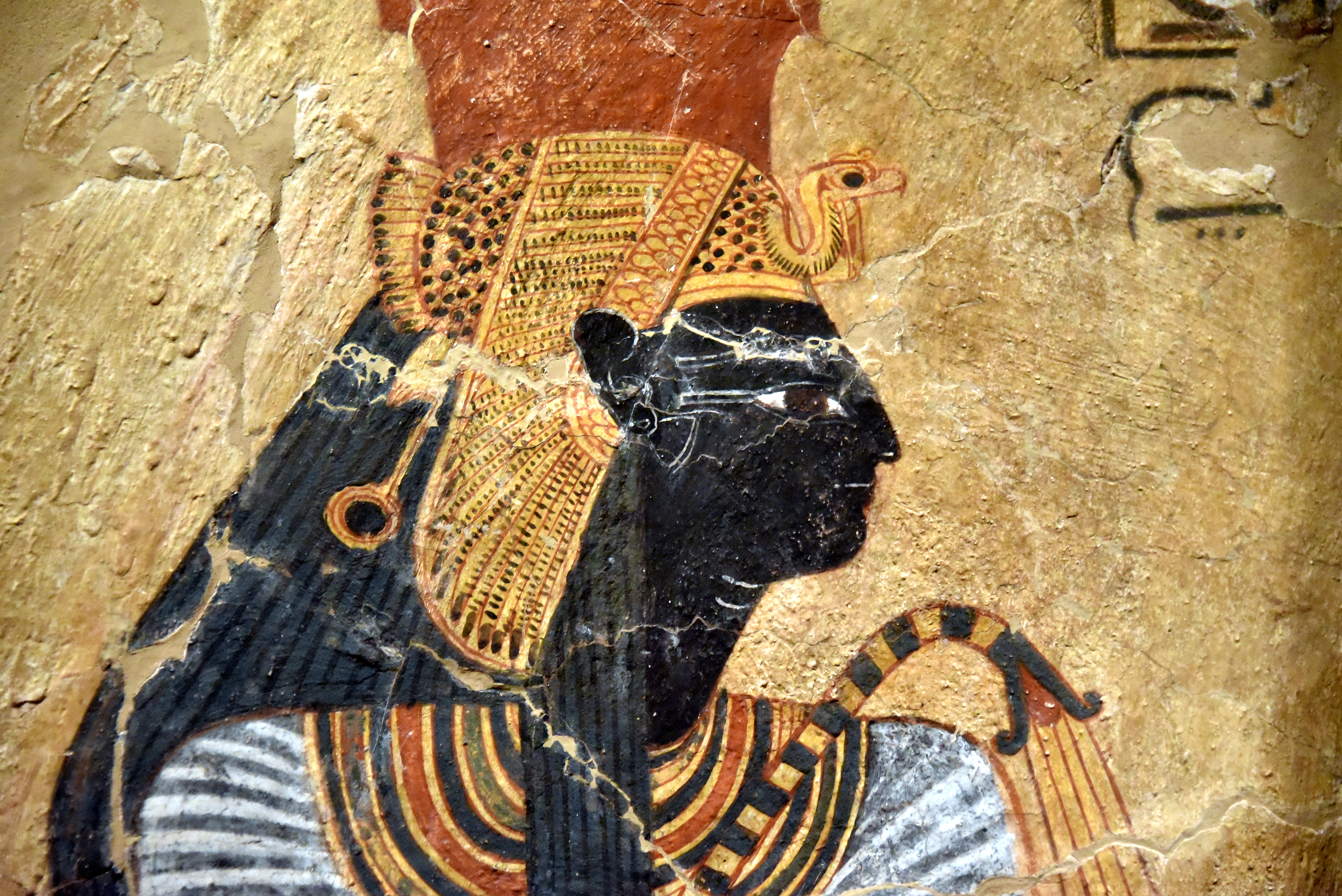
Queen Ahmose-Nefertari of the 18th Dynasty

Ahmose-Nefertari is an example. In most depictions of Ahmose-Nefertari, she is pictured with black skin, while in some instances her skin is blue or red. In 1939 Flinders Petrie said "an invasion from the south...established a black queen as the divine ancestress of the XVIIIth dynasty" He also said "a possibility of the black being symbolic has been suggested" and "Nefertari must have married a Libyan, as she was the mother of Amenhetep I, who was of fair Libyan style."

In 1961 Alan Gardiner, in describing the walls of tombs in the Deir el-Medina area, noted in passing that Ahmose-Nefertari was "well represented" in these tomb illustrations, and that her countenance was sometimes black and sometimes blue. He did not offer any explanation for these colors, but noted that her probable ancestry ruled out that she might have had black blood. In 1974, Diop described Ahmose-Nefertari as "typically negroid." In the controversial book Black Athena, the hypotheses of which have been widely rejected by mainstream scholarship, Martin Bernal considered her skin color in paintings to be a clear sign of Nubian ancestry. In 1981 Michel Gitton noted that while in most artistic depictions of the queen she is pictured with black complexion, there are other cases in which she is shown with a pink, golden, blue, or dark red skin color.

Gitton called the issue of Ahmose-Nefertari's black color "a serious gap in the Egyptological research, which allows approximations or untruths." He pointed out that there is no known depiction of her painted during her lifetime (she is represented with the same light skin as other represented individuals in tomb TT15, before her deification); the earliest black skin depiction appears in tomb TT161, circa 150 years after her death. Barbara Lesko wrote in 1996 that Ahmose-Nefertari was "sometimes portrayed by later generations as having been black, although her coffin portrait gives her the typical light yellow skin of women."

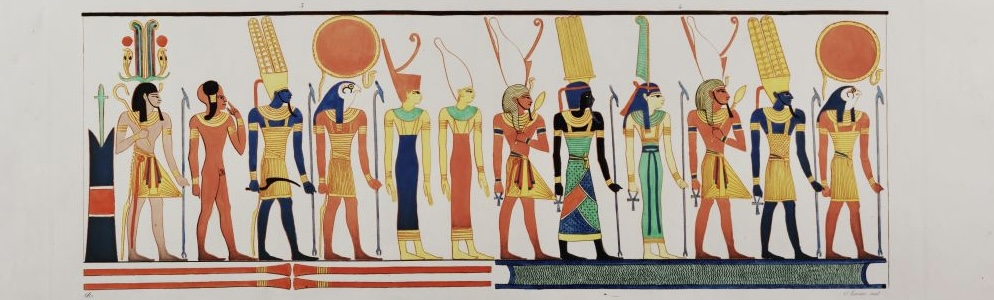
A plate from Monumenti dell'Egitto e della Nubia. The gods shown here have varying skin tones, including yellow, brown, blue and black.

In 2003, Betsy Bryan wrote in The Oxford History of Ancient Egypt that "the factors linking Amenhotep I and his mother with the necropolis region, with deified rulers, and with rejuvenation generally was visually transmitted by representations of the pair with black or blue skin – both colours of resurrection." In 2004 Aidan Dodson and Dyan Hilton recognized in a later depiction of the queen, "the black skin of a deity of resurrection" in connection to her role as a patron goddess of the Theban necropolis. Scholars such as Joyce Tyldesley, Sigrid Hodel-Hoenes, and Graciela Gestoso Singer, argued that the skin color of Ahmose-Nefertari is indicative of her role as a goddess of resurrection, since black is both the color of the fertile land of Egypt and that of Duat, the underworld.

Singer recognizes that "Some scholars have suggested that this is a sign of Nubian ancestry." Singer also states a statuette of Ahmose-Nefertari at the Museo Egizio in Turin which shows her with a black face, though her arms and feet are not darkened, thus suggesting that the black coloring has an iconographic motive and does not reflect her actual appearance. In 2014, Margaret Bunson wrote that "the unusual depictions of Ahmose-Nefertari in blue-black tones of deification reflect her status and cult." In a wooden votive statue of Ahmose-Nefertari, currently in the Louvre museum, her skin was painted red, a color commonly seen symbolizing life or a higher being, or elevated status.

== Historical hypotheses ==
Since the second half of the 20th century, typological and hierarchical models of race have increasingly been rejected by scientists, and most scholars have held that applying modern notions of race to ancient Egypt is anachronistic. The current position of modern scholarship is that the Egyptian civilization was an indigenous Nile Valley development (see population history of Egypt). At the UNESCO symposium in 1974, several participants concluded that the ancient Egyptian population was indigenous to the Nile Valley, originated largely in the Sahara, and was made up of people from north and south of the Sahara who were differentiated by their color.

=== Black Egyptian hypothesis ===
The Black Egyptian hypothesis is the hypothesis that ancient Egypt was a "Black", homogeneous civilization. At a UNESCO symposium in 1974 there was consensus that Ancient Egypt was indigenous to Africa.

However, Diop's hypothesis that Ancient Egypt was a "Black" civilization was met with "numerous objections" in 1974 which revealed "a disagreement which remained profound even though it was not voiced explicitly. In respect of certain sequences, the criticisms arose out of the line of argument put forward." The majority of the objections "raised were of methodological nature" which ranged from the need for reliable statistical data to further research projects in several fields such as archaeology and physical anthropology before final conclusions on the peopling of Egypt could be made. There was also "total disagreement" from the majority of scholars in the 1974 conference on the hypothesis that Ancient Egypt had been a homogenous population until Persian times with several scholars favouring the hypothesis of a mixed population.

Subsequent reviewers of the 1974 symposium debate and the UNESCO publication have presented a range of views on the outcome of the debate. Larissa Nordholt argued that Diop's chapter was politically motivated, having been published only due to being in line with UNESCO's political imperatives, despite clashing with accepted historical methods and standards of academic rigor. Nordholdt argued that Diop's views aligned with the decolonization efforts of the General History of Africa (GHA) but that he premised his arguments on outdated, racialism which classified humanity into distinct groups with a biological essence. However, she did state that the contributors did "come to a general consensus that the Egyptians could not have been "white" in the same way that Europeans were" and the dissemination of Diop’s ideas contributed to a wider recognition that the Ancient Egypt was an African civilisation although his methods were “not considered entirely permissible by most of the other GHA historians” According to Larissa Nordholdt, "Many reviewers, however, still objected to what they identified as an overtly political ideology within the GHA. They did not necessarily object to the flavour of that ideology, but rather to the presence of a political agenda as such. Often Diop’s chapter seemed to serve as a catalyst for that sentiment". Peter Shinnie reviewing the General History of Africa volume, wrote that "It seems that UNESCO and [the editor] Mokhtar were embarrassed by the unscholarly and preposterous nature of Diop's views but were unable to reject his contribution". However, Bethwell Allan Ogot, a Kenyan historian and editor of UNESCO General History of Africa Volume 5, stated that “Cheikh Anta Diop wrested Egyptian civilization from the Egyptologists and restored it to the mainstream of African history”. Stephen Quirke argued that the UNESCO-sponsored conference on the General History of Africa in 1974 "did not change the Eurocentric climate of research" and of the need to incorporate both African-centred studies and European academic perspectives. He later outlined that "research conferences and publications on the history and language of Kemet [Egypt] remain dominated, beyond 90%, by those brought up and trained in European, not African societies and languages (which include Arabic)".

The Black Egyptian hypothesis includes a particular focus on links to Sub Saharan cultures and the questioning of the race of specific notable individuals from Dynastic times, including Tutankhamun the person represented in the Great Sphinx of Giza, and the Greek Ptolemaic queen Cleopatra. Advocates of the Black African model rely heavily on writings from Classical Greek historians, including Strabo, Diodorus Siculus, Ammianus Marcellinus, and Herodotus. Advocates claim that these "classical" authors referred to Egyptians as "Black with woolly hair". The Greek word used was "melanchroes", and the English language translation of this Greek word is disputed, being translated by many as "dark-skinned" and by many others as "black". (Note: Diop said "Herodotus applied melanchroes to both Ethiopians and Egyptians...and melanchroes is the strongest term in Greek to denote blackness." According to historian and classicist to Alan B. Lloyd "there is no linguistic justification" for relating the term Melanchroes to blacks, since it "could denote any colour from bronzed to black (LSJ p. 1094, b)". Snowden claims that Diop is distorting his classical sources and is quoting them selectively. According to Snowden, "both Egyptians and Ethiopians as melanes, but mentions only Ethiopians, not Egyptians, as having exceedingly woolly hair. In short, Ethiopians whose skin was the blackest and whose hair was the woolliest or most tightly curled of all mankind were the only people in classical texts who correspond roughly to the concept of blacks or Negroes as generally understood in modern usage". Keita specified that the historical accounts of the ancient Greeks were of limited value as "they were not working within modern science" and it remained unclear if distinctions between Egyptians and Ethiopians were cultural rather than biological at certain times. He also added that "some Greeks reported that Egypt was an Ethiopian colony". There is dispute about the historical accuracy of the works of Herodotus – some scholars support the reliability of Herodotus while other scholars regard his works as being unreliable as historical sources, particularly those relating to Egypt.)

Other claims used to support the Black Hypothesis included anthropological measurements of Egyptian mummies, testing melanin levels in a small sample of mummies, language affinities between ancient Egyptian language and Sub-Saharan languages, interpretations of the origin of the name Kmt, conventionally pronounced Kemet, used by the ancient Egyptians to describe themselves or their land (depending on points of view), biblical traditions, shared B blood group between Egyptians and West Africans, and interpretations of the depictions of the Egyptians in numerous paintings and statues.

The hypothesis also claimed cultural affiliations, such as circumcision, matriarchy, totemism, hair braiding, head binding, and kingship cults. Artifacts found at Qustul (near Abu Simbel – Modern Sudan) in 1960–64 were seen as showing that Ancient Egypt and the A-Group culture of Nubia shared the same culture and were part of the greater Nile Valley sub-stratum, but more recent finds in Egypt indicate that the Qustul rulers probably adopted/emulated the symbols of Egyptian pharaohs.

Authors and critics state the hypothesis is primarily adopted by Afrocentrists. The current position of modern scholarship is that the Egyptian civilization was an indigenous Nile Valley development (see population history of Egypt).

=== Asiatic race theory ===
This theory was the most dominant view from the Early Middle Ages (c. 500 AD) until the early 19th century. The descendants of Ham were traditionally considered to be the darkest-skinned branch of humanity, either because of their geographic allotment to Africa or because of the Curse of Ham. Thus, Diop cited Gaston Maspero "Moreover, the Bible states that Mesraim, son of Ham, brother of Chus (Kush) ... and of Canaan, came from Mesopotamia to settle with his children on the banks of the Nile."

By the 20th century, the Asiatic race theory and its various offshoots were abandoned but were superseded by two related theories: the Eurocentric Hamitic hypothesis, asserting that a Caucasian racial group moved into North and East Africa from early prehistory subsequently bringing with them all advanced agriculture, technology and civilization, and the Dynastic race theory, proposing that Mesopotamian invaders were responsible for the dynastic civilization of Egypt (c. 3000 BC). In sharp contrast to the Asiatic race theory, neither of these theories proposes that Caucasians were the indigenous inhabitants of Egypt.

At the UNESCO "Symposium on the Peopling of Ancient Egypt and the Deciphering of the Meroitic Script" in Cairo in 1974, none of the participants explicitly voiced support for any theory where Egyptians were Caucasian with a dark pigmentation." The current position of modern scholarship is that the Egyptian civilization was an indigenous Nile Valley development (see population history of Egypt).

=== Caucasian / Hamitic hypothesis ===
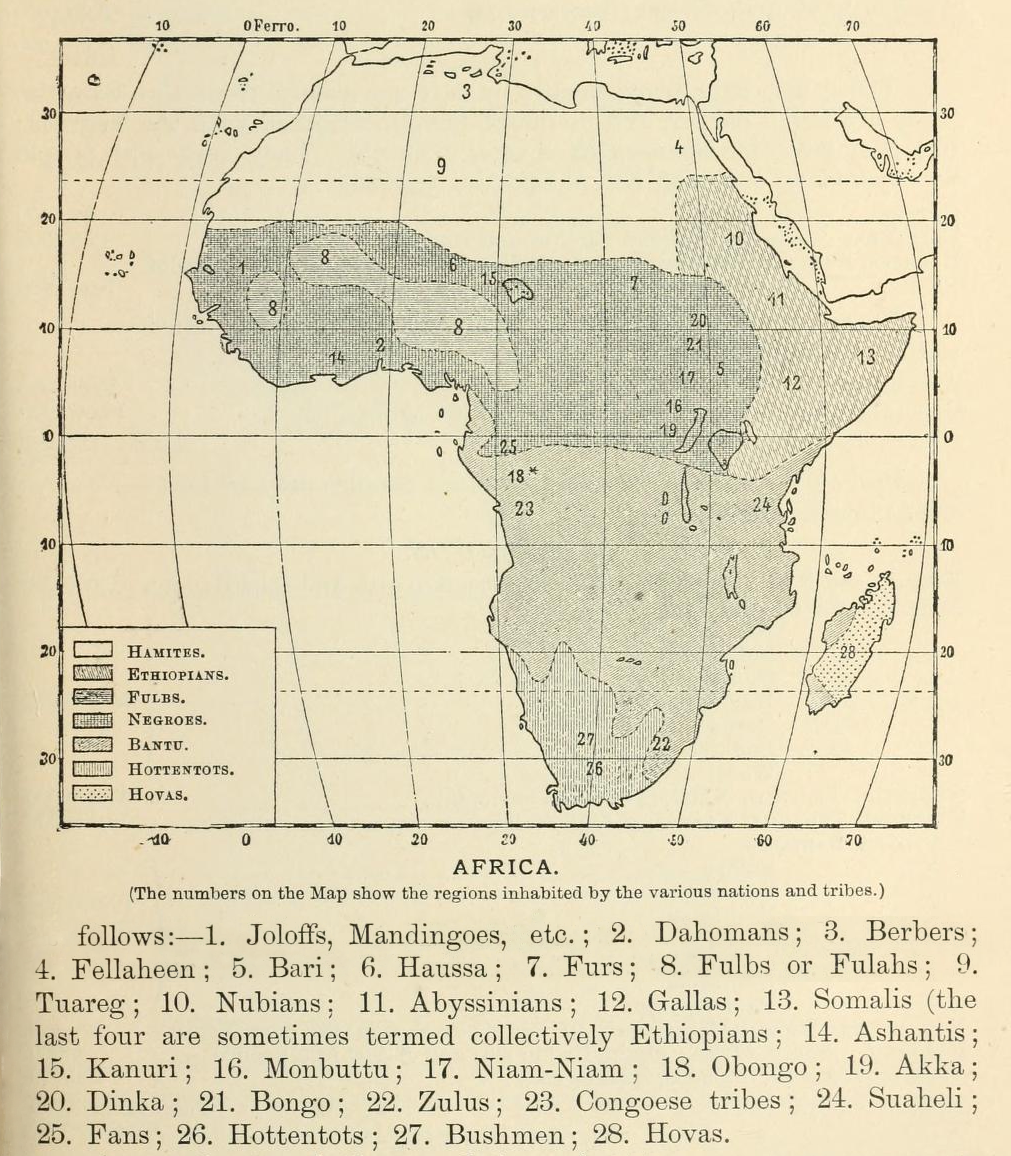
1889 ethnographic map of Africa, showing the supposed Hamites in white.

The Caucasian hypothesis, which has been rejected by mainstream scholarship, is the hypothesis that the Nile valley "was originally peopled by a branch of the Caucasian race". It was proposed in 1844 by Samuel George Morton, who acknowledged that Negroes were present in ancient Egypt but claimed they were either captives or servants. George Gliddon (1844) wrote: "Asiatic in their origin .... the Egyptians were white men, of no darker hue than a pure Arab, a Jew, or a Phoenician."

The similar Hamitic hypothesis, which has been rejected by mainstream scholarship, developed directly from the Asiatic Race Theory, and argued that the Ethiopid and Arabid populations of the Horn of Africa were the inventors of agriculture and had brought all civilization to Africa. It asserted that these people were Caucasians, not Negroid. It also rejected any Biblical basis despite using Hamitic as the theory's name. Charles Gabriel Seligman in his Some Aspects of the Hamitic Problem in the Anglo-Egyptian Sudan (1913) and later works argued that the ancient Egyptians were among this group of Caucasian Hamites, having arrived in the Nile Valley during early prehistory and introduced technology and agriculture to primitive natives they found there.

The Italian anthropologist Giuseppe Sergi (1901) believed that ancient Egyptians were the Eastern African (Hamitic) branch of the Mediterranean race, which he called "Eurafrican". According to Sergi, the Mediterranean race or "Eurafrican" contains three varieties or sub-races: the African (Hamitic) branch, the Mediterranean "proper" branch and the Nordic (depigmented) branch. Sergi maintained in summary that the Mediterranean race (excluding the depigmented Nordic or 'white') is: "a brown human variety, neither white nor Negroid, but pure in its elements, that is to say not a product of the mixture of Whites with Negroes or Negroid peoples".

Grafton Elliot Smith modified the theory in 1911, stating that the ancient Egyptians were a dark haired "brown race", most closely "linked by the closest bonds of racial affinity to the Early Neolithic populations of the North African littoral and South Europe", and not Negroid. Smith's "brown race" is not synonymous or equivalent with Sergi's Mediterranean race. The Hamitic Hypothesis was still popular in the 1960s and late 1970s and was supported notably by Anthony John Arkell and George Peter Murdock.

At the UNESCO "Symposium on the Peopling of Ancient Egypt and the Deciphering of the Meroitic Script" in Cairo in 1974, none of the participants explicitly voiced support for any theory where Egyptians were Caucasian with a dark pigmentation." The current position of modern scholarship is that the Egyptian civilization was an indigenous Nile Valley development (see population history of Egypt).

=== Turanid race hypothesis ===
The Turanid race hypothesis, which has been rejected by mainstream scholarship, is the hypothesis that the ancient Egyptians belonged to the Turanid race, linking them to the Tatars.

It was proposed by Egyptologist Samuel Sharpe in 1846, who was "inspired" by some ancient Egyptian paintings, which depict Egyptians with sallow or yellowish skin. He said "From the colour given to the women in their paintings we learn that their skin was yellow, like that of the Mongul Tartars, who have given their name to the Mongolian variety of the human race.... The single lock of hair on the young nobles reminds us also of the Tartars."

The current position of modern scholarship is that the Egyptian civilization was an indigenous Nile Valley development (see population history of Egypt).

=== Dynastic race theory ===
The Dynastic race theory, which has been rejected by modern scholarship, is the hypothesis that a Mesopotamian force had invaded Egypt in predynastic times, imposed itself on the indigenous Badarian people, and become their rulers. The Mesopotamian-founded state or states were supposed to have conquered both Upper and Lower Egypt and founded the First Dynasty of Egypt.

The theory was proposed in the early 20th century by Flinders Petrie, who deduced that skeletal remains found at pre-dynastic sites at Naqada (Upper Egypt) indicated the presence of two different races, with one race differentiated physically by a noticeably larger skeletal structure and cranial capacity. Petrie also noted new architectural styles—the distinctly Mesopotamian "niched-façade" architecture—pottery styles, cylinder seals and a few artworks, as well as numerous predynastic rock and tomb paintings depicting Mesopotamian style boats, symbols, and figures. Based on plentiful cultural evidence, Petrie concluded that the invading ruling elite was responsible for the seemingly sudden rise of Egyptian civilization. In the 1950s, the dynastic race theory was widely accepted.

While there is clear evidence the Naqada II culture borrowed abundantly from Mesopotamia, the Naqada II period had a large degree of continuity with the Naqada I period, and the changes which did happen during the Naqada periods happened over significant amounts of time. The most commonly held view today is that the achievements of the First Dynasty were the result of a long period of cultural and political development, and the current position of modern scholarship is that the Egyptian civilization was an indigenous Nile Valley development.

Frank Yurco stated that depictions of pharonic iconography such as the royal crowns, Horus falcons and victory scenes were concentrated in the Upper Egyptian Naqada culture and A-Group Nubia. He further elaborated that "Egyptian writing arose in Naqadan Upper Egypt and A-Group Nubia, and not in the Delta cultures, where the direct Western Asian contact was made, [which] further vititates the Mesopotamian-influence argument". According to David Wengrow, the A-Group polity of the late 4th millenninum BCE is poorly understood since most of the archaeological remains are submerged underneath Lake Nasser.

The Senegalese Egyptologist Cheikh Anta Diop fought against the dynastic race theory with his own "Black Egyptian" theory and claimed, among other things, that Eurocentric scholars supported the dynastic race theory "to avoid having to admit that Ancient Egyptians were black". Martin Bernal proposed that the dynastic race theory was conceived by European scholars to deny Egypt its African roots.

== Reactions in modern Egypt ==
Egyptian geoarchaeologist Fekri Hassan wrote, in an article titled "The African Dimension of Egyptian Origins", in 2021:

Sadly, one of the main impediments is the persistence of inherited statements that perpetuate defunct racist constructions of African peoples that were once provided in the context of “science.” This is appalling given that modern anthropological and linguistic studies have destroyed the myth of races quite some time ago. In addition, to be “African” does not mean to necessarily be “Black” or “Brown” or to have certain facial features judging by the extensive variations in Africa, even sub-Saharan Africa, which begins in southern Egypt. The biological assimilation of various peoples into a range of African populations is a part of African biological history.

In 2023, American comedian Kevin Hart's planned tour of Egypt was cancelled, after an uproar on Egyptian social media over Afrocentric claims made by Hart about Egyptian history.

In response to the Hart controversy, Egyptian Egyptologist Zahi Hawass stated that "Africans have nothing to do with the pyramids scientifically" Hawass has previously commented on the race controversy and expressed the view that "No Africans built the pyramids because Kushites didn't exist at the period when the pyramids were built" and dismissed the "notions that Egyptians are Black Africans despite our presence in Africa".

== See also ==
- African historiography
- Ancient Egypt in the Western imagination
- Broken noses in ancient Egyptian statues
- Cradle of humanity
- Cradle of civilization
- Demographics of Egypt
- Genetic history of Africa
- Genetic history of the Middle East
- History of Africa
- History of anthropology
- Pharaonism – Egyptian nationalist ideology
- Yakub (Nation of Islam) – Figure in the mythology of the Nation of Islam

== Sources ==
- Ashton, Sally-Ann (Spring 2002), "Identifying the ROM's 'Cleopatra'", Rotunda: 36–39, archived from the original on May 19, 2020.
- Bard, Kathryn A. (1992). "Ancient Egyptians and the issue of Race". Bostonia Magazine.: later part of Black Athena Revisited, 1996
- Baum, Bruce (2006). The Rise and Fall of the Caucasian Race: A Political History of Racial Identity. New York University Press. ISBN 978-0-8147-9892-8.
- Beard, Mary (March 16, 2009). "The skeleton of Cleopatra's sister? Steady on". The Times Literary Supplement. Archived from the original on March 17, 2009.
- Bradford, Ernle (2003), Cleopatra, Penguin Group, ISBN 978-0141390147
- Campbell, John (1851). Negro-mania: Being an Examination of the Falsely Assumed Equality of the Various Races of Men. Campbell & Powers.
- Candelora, Danielle (2022). Candelora, Danielle; Ben-Marzouk, Nadia; Cooney, Kathyln (eds.). Ancient Egyptian society: challenging assumptions, exploring approaches. Abingdon, Oxon: Routledge. ISBN 978-0367434632.
- Challis, Debbie (2013). The Archaeology of Race: The Eugenic Ideas of Francis Galton and Flinders Petrie. Bloomsbury Academic. ISBN 978-1472502193.
- Jacques Joseph, Champollion-Figeac (1839). Égypte ancienne (in French). Firmin Didot frères.
- Chasseboeuf, Constantin François de (1862). La loi naturelle ou Principes physiques de la morale déduits de l'organisation de l'homme et de l'univers [Natural Law or Physical Principles of Morality Deduced from the Organization of Man and the Universe] (in French). Davoine.
- Chasseboeuf, Constantin François de (1787). Voyage en Syrie et en Egypte, pendant les années 1783, 1784 et 1785: avec deux cartes géographiques et deux planches gravées représentant les Ruines du Temple du Soleil à Balbek, et celles de la ville de Palmyre, dans le désert de Syrie [Travel in Syria and Egypt, during the years 1783, 1784 and 1785: with two geographical maps and two engraved plates representing the Ruins of the Temple of the Sun at Balbek, and those of the city of Palmyra, in the Syrian desert] (in French). Desenne.
- Cheshire, Wendy (2011), "The Phantom Sister of Ptolemy Alexander", Enchoria, 32: 120–130
- Dain, Bruce R. (2002). A Hideous Monster Of The Mind: American race theory in the early republic. Harvard University Press. ISBN 978-0674030145 – via Google Books.
- Diop, Cheikh Anta (1974). The African Origin of Civilization. Chicago, Illinois: Lawrence Hill Books. ISBN 978-1-55652-072-3.
- Dudley, Donald (1960). The Civilization of Rome. New York: New American Library. p. 57. ISBN 978-1258450540.
- Ferroukhi, Mafoud (2001a), "197 Marble portrait, perhaps of Cleopatra VII's daughter, Cleopatra Selene, Queen of Mauretania", in Walker, Susan; Higgs, Peter (eds.), Cleopatra of Egypt: from History to Myth, Princeton, N.J.: Princeton University Press (British Museum Press), p. 219, ISBN 978-0691088358.
- Goldsworthy, Adrian Keith (2010). Antony and Cleopatra. New Haven, CT: Yale University Press. ISBN 978-0300165340.
- Grant, Michael (1972). Cleopatra. Edison, NJ: Barnes & Noble Books. pp. 4, 5. ISBN 978-0880297257.
- Jablonski, Nina (2012). Living Color: The Biological and Social Meaning of Skin Color. University of California Press. ISBN 978-0-520-95377-2.
- Jones, Prudence J. (2006). Cleopatra: a sourcebook. Norman, Oklahoma: University of Oklahoma Press. ISBN 978-0806137414.
- Keita, S.O.Y.; Boyce, A.J. (1996). "The Geographical Origins and Population Relationships of Early Ancient Egyptians". In Celenko, Theodore (ed.). Egypt in Africa. pp. 23–24.
- Kemp, Barry J. (2006). Ancient Egypt: Anatomy Of A Civilization. Psychology Press. p. 21. ISBN 978-0-415-06346-3 – via Google Books.
- Kleiner, Diana E. E. (2005). Cleopatra and Rome. Cambridge, MA: Belknap Press of Harvard University Press. ISBN 978-0674019058.
- Lefkowitz, Mary (1992). "Ancient History, Modern Myths". The New Republic.. Reprinted with revisions as part of the essay collection Black Athena Revisited, 1996
- Lefkowitz, Mary (1997). "Not Out Of Africa: How ""Afrocentrism"" Became An Excuse To Teach Myth As". The New Republic.
- Lippert, Sandra (2013), "What's New in Demotic Studies? An Overview of the Publications 2010-2013" (PDF), The Journal of Juristic Papyrology: 33–48.
- Mahaffy, J.P. (2001). A History of Egypt under the Ptolemaic Dynasty. Edison, NJ: Barnes & Noble Books. p. 225. ISBN 978-0880297257.
- Milton, John; Bandia, Paul Fadio (2009). Agents of Translation. John Benjamins Publishing. ISBN 978-90-272-1690-8.
- National Geographic, Reference Populations – Geno 2.0 Next Generation, genographic.nationalgeographic.com, archived from the original on April 7, 2016
- Noguera, Anthony (1976). How African Was Egypt?: A Comparative Study of Ancient Egyptian and Black African Cultures. Illustrated by Joelle Noguera. New York: Vantage Press.
- Petrie, Flinders (1939). The Making of Egypt. Sheldon Press.
- Pina Polo, Francisco (2013). "The Great Seducer: Cleopatra, Queen and Sex Symbol". In Knippschild, Silke; García Morcillo, Marta (eds.). Seduction and Power: Antiquity in the Visual and Performing Arts. London: Bloomsbury Academic. pp. 183–197. ISBN 978-1441190659.
- Preston, Diana (2009). Cleopatra and Antony. New York: Walker & Company. ISBN 978-0802710598.
- "Ptolemaic Dynasty Affiliates". www.tyndalehouse.com. Archived from the original on 2011-07-16. Retrieved 2017-06-09
- Redford, Donald B. (2004). From Slave to Pharaoh: The Black Experience of Ancient Egypt. JHU Press. ISBN 978-0801878145.
- Roller, Duane W. (2003), The World of Juba II and Kleopatra Selene: Royal Scholarship on Rome's African Frontier, New York: Routledge, ISBN 978-0415305969.
- Roller, Duane W. (2010). Cleopatra: a biography. Oxford: Oxford University Press. ISBN 978-0195365535.
- Roller, Duane W. (December 6, 2010). Cleopatra's true racial background (and does it really matter?). Oxford University Press.
- Samson, Julia (1990). Nefertiti & Cleopatra. Stacey International. ISBN 978-0948695186.
- Sanders, Edith R. (1969). "The Hamitic hypothesis: its origin and functions in time perspective". The Journal of African History. 10 (4): 521–532. doi:10.1017/S0021853700009683. S2CID 162920355.
- Schiff, Stacy (2011). Cleopatra: A Life. UK: Random House. ISBN 978-0316001946.
- Shavit, Yaacov (2001). History in Black. African-Americans in Search of an Ancient Past. Frank Cass Publishers.
- Snowden, Frank M. (1996). "Bernal's "Blacks" and the Afrocentrists". Black Athena Revisited.
- Tafton, Scott (2004). Egypt Land: Race and Nineteenth-Century American Egyptomania. Duke University Press. ISBN 0822333627 – via Google Books.
- Tyldesley, Joyce (2009). Cleopatra, Last Queen of Egypt. Profile Books Ltd. ISBN 978-1-86197-901-8.
- Watterson, Barbara (2020). Cleopatra: Fact and Fiction. Amberley Publishing. ISBN 978-1-445-66965-6.
