= Life of Sethos =

Life of Sethos, Taken from Private Memoirs of the Ancient Egyptians (French: Séthos, histoire, ou Vie tirée des monumens, anecdotes de l'ancienne Égypte, traduite d'un manuscrit grec) is an influential fantasy novel originally published in six volumes at Paris in 1731 by the French abbé Jean Terrasson. An English translation by Thomas Lediard published at London by J. Walthoe appeared in 1732.

According to classicist Mary Lefkowitz, Sethos:

Purports to be a translation of an ancient manuscript found in the library of an unnamed foreign nation that is "extremely jealous of this sort of treasure". The author is said to have been an anonymous Greek in the second century A.D. Here Terrasson is following the conventions of ancient writers of historical fictions, such as the author of the Hermetica, who pretend that their works are translations of ancient writings that no one but themselves has seen. But Terrasson is careful not to deceive his readers completely: he assures them that the work he has "translated" for them is a fiction... He assures them that although fictional, the story keeps close to ancient sources, which, for the reader's convenience, he cites throughout the text. But he also says that "it is natural to suppose" that his author had access to original sources (now lost), such as memoirs available in the sacred archives of Egypt, written by unknown priests who accompanied Sethos on his travels. The sophisticated reader would be amused by the notion that the anonymous author had consulted these otherwise unknown documents, but Terrasson gives no warning to less well-educated readers that there is in fact no reason to "suppose" that these documents ever existed.

The book is cited in Afrocentric works that argued for a suppressed Egyptian origin of Greek culture and philosophy, including Martin Bernal's Black Athena: The Afroasiatic Roots of Classical Civilization and George James's Stolen Legacy: Greek Philosophy Is Stolen Egyptian Philosophy. It is also a key source of popular conspiracy theories positing a secret pagan subculture of Freemasons, devotees of Satan, and environmentalists dedicated to the overthrow of Christianity.

== Historical Sethos ==
The Greek historian Herodotus in his Histories (book II, chapter 141) writes of a High Priest of Ptah named Sethos (Ancient Greek: Σεθῶν Sethon) who became pharaoh and defeated the Assyrians with divine intervention. This name is probably a corruption of Shebitku (or Shabataka), the actual pharaoh at the time, who was a Kushite of the Twenty-fifth Dynasty. According to Herodotus:

After him there came to the throne the priest of Hephaistos, whose name was Sethos. This man, they said, neglected and held in no regard the warrior class of the Egyptians, considering that he would have no need of them; and besides other slights which he put upon them, he also took from them the yokes of corn-land 125 which had been given to them as a special gift in the reigns of the former kings, twelve yokes to each man. After this, Sanacharib king of the Arabians and of the Assyrians marched a great host against Egypt. Then the warriors of the Egyptians refused to come to the rescue, and the priest, being driven into a strait, entered into the sanctuary of the temple 126 and bewailed to the image of the god the danger which was impending over him; and as he was thus lamenting, sleep came upon him, and it seemed to him in his vision that the god came and stood by him and encouraged him, saying that he should suffer no evil if he went forth to meet the army of the Arabians; for he himself would send him helpers. Trusting in these things seen in sleep, he took with him, they said, those of the Egyptians who were willing to follow him, and encamped in Pelusion, for by this way the invasion came: and not one of the warrior class followed him, but shop-keepers and artisans and men of the market. Then after they came, there swarmed by night upon their enemies mice of the fields, and ate up their quivers and their bows, and moreover the handles of their shields, so that on the next day they fled, and being without defence of arms great numbers fell. And at the present time this king stands in the temple of Hephaistos in stone, holding upon his hand a mouse, and by letters inscribed he says these words: "Let him who looks upon me learn to fear the gods".

== See also ==
- Thamos, King of Egypt, an 18th-century play also set in ancient Egypt
