= Black Athena =

Book by Martin Bernal

Black Athena: The Afroasiatic Roots of Classical Civilization
- Author: Martin Bernal
- Language: English
- Subject: Ancient Greece
- Publisher: Rutgers University Press
- Publication date: 1987
- Publication place: United States
- Media type: Print
- ISBN: 978-0-8135-1277-8

Black Athena: The Afroasiatic Roots of Classical Civilization, published in 1987 (vol. 1), 1991 (vol. 2), and 2006 (vol. 3), is a controversial trilogy by the British Professor of Government and Near Eastern Studies Martin Bernal proposing an alternative hypothesis on the origins of ancient Greece and classical civilisation. Bernal's thesis discusses the perception of ancient Greece in relation to Greece's North African and West Asian neighbours, especially the ancient Egyptians and Phoenicians who, he believes, colonized ancient Greece producing the bulk of Classical civilization. Bernal proposed that a change in the Western perception of Greece in the 18th century led to the denial of any significant Egyptian and Phoenician influence on ancient Greek civilization.

Black Athena has been heavily criticised and rejected by the majority of academics, many of whom consider it pseudoarcheological. They often highlight the fact that there is no archaeological or historical evidence for ancient Egyptian colonization of mainland Greece or the Aegean Islands. Academic reviews of Bernal's work overwhelmingly reject his heavy reliance on ancient Greek mythology and literature, speculative assertions, and handling of archaeological, linguistic, and historical data.

== Thesis ==
=== Origins of Ancient Greek civilization ===
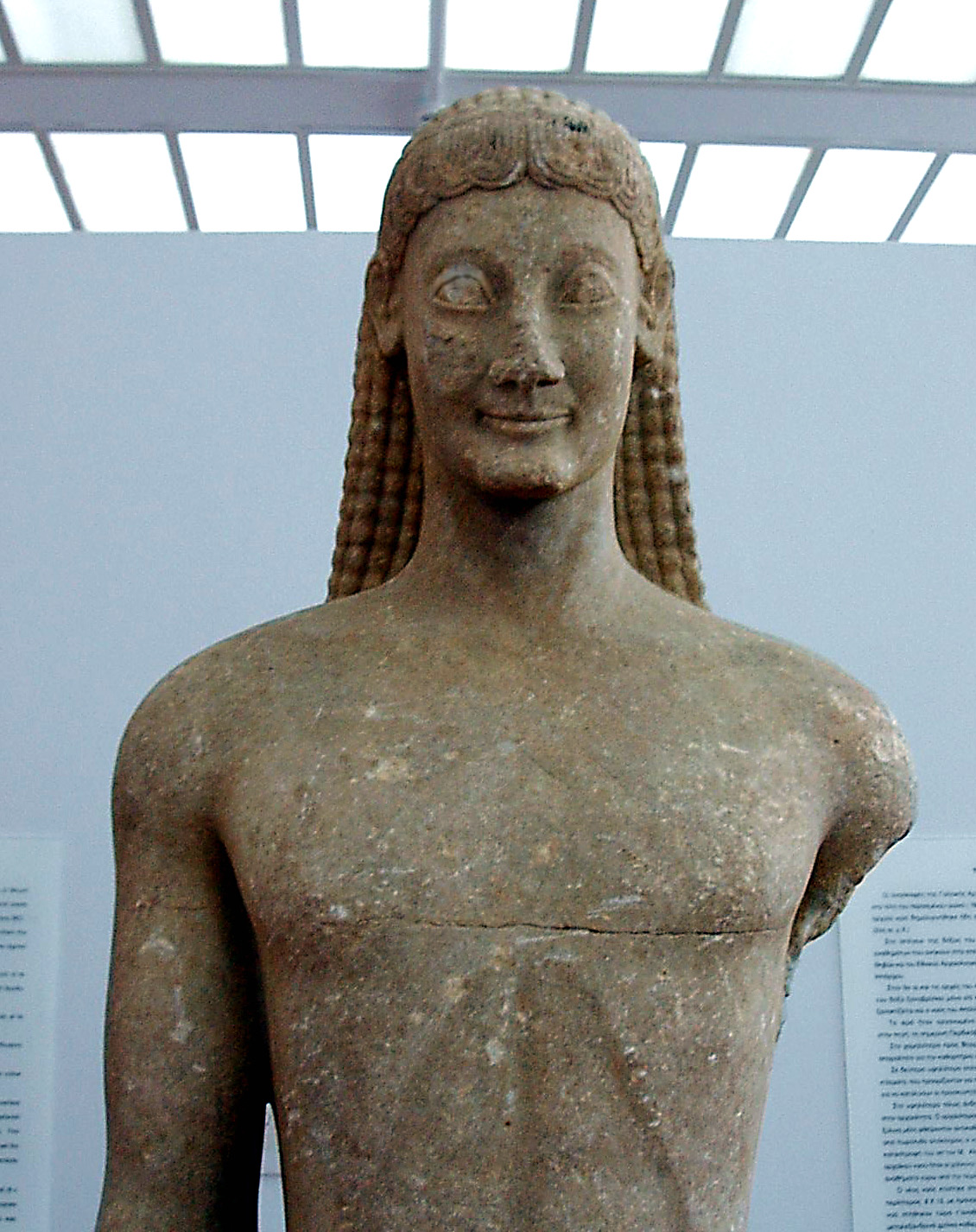
An archaic Greek Kouros from Thebes in the so-called Orientalizing style.

Bernal rejects the theory that Greek civilization was founded by Indo-European settlers from Central Europe. This theory, which Bernal calls the Aryan model, came to be generally accepted during the 19th century. Bernal defends instead what he calls the Ancient model; the name refers to the fact that Egyptian and Phoenician (as well as Mesopotamian and Anatolian) influences on the Greek world were widely accepted in antiquity.

Bernal discusses Aeschylus's play, The Suppliants, which describes the arrival in Argos from Egypt of the Danaids, daughters of Danaus. Cadmus was believed to have introduced the Asiatic Phoenician alphabet to Greece. Herodotus also mentions Eastern influences. Thucydides did not, which Bernal explains with his nationalistic wish to set up a sharp distinction between Greeks and barbarians. Plutarch attacked Herodotus' view that the Greeks had learned from barbarians. Yet Alexander the Great was very interested in Egypt; Plutarch himself wrote a work On Isis and Osiris, part of the Moralia, which is a major source on Egypt. Admiration for Egypt was widespread in the Hellenistic and Roman civilizations, especially in the Neoplatonic school. Hermeticism was based on writings attributed to Egyptian Hermes Trismegistus, the so-called Hermetica including the Hermetic corpus. These pro-Egyptian currents influenced Christianity, Judaism and Islam, as well as Renaissance figures such as Copernicus, Ficino and Giordano Bruno. It was demonstrated in 1614 that the Hermetic corpus was not very ancient at all and originated in late antiquity, though more recent scholarship has established that parts of it do probably have a Pharaonic origin. Casaubon's textual analysis partly discredited the Hermetic corpus, but Bernal maintained that respect for Ancient Egypt survived and contributed to the Enlightenment in the 18th century. The Freemasons are particularly relevant.

Bernal traces thus the influence from the Ancient Egyptians and Phoenicians to the Ancient Greeks, and a tradition of acknowledgement of those links from Antiquity to the Enlightenment.

Bernal uses linguistic evidence to support his claim of a link between Ancient Greece and earlier Egyptian and Phoenician civilizations. The Classical Greek language arose from the Proto-Greek language with influences from the Anatolian languages such as Hittite, Luwian, Hurrian and Hattian that were spoken nearby, and the culture is assumed to have developed from a comparable amalgamation of elements.

However, Bernal attempts to emphasize North African elements in Ancient Near Eastern culture and denounces the alleged Eurocentrism of 19th and 20th century research, including the very slogan "Ex Oriente Lux" of Orientalists which, according to Bernal, betrays "the Western appropriation of ancient Near Eastern culture for the sake of its own development."

Bernal proposes instead that Greek evolved from the contact between an Indo-European language and culturally influential Egyptian and West Asian Semitic languages. He believes that many Greek words have Egyptian or Semitic roots. Bernal places the introduction of the Greek alphabet (unattested before 750 BC) between 1800 and 1400 BC, and the poet Hesiod in the tenth century.

=== Ideologies of classical scholarship ===
The first volume of Black Athena describes in detail Bernal's views on how the Ancient model acknowledging Egyptian and Phoenician influences on Greece came under attack during the 18th and 19th centuries. Bernal concentrates on four interrelated forces: the Christian reaction, the idea of progress, racism and Romantic Hellenism.

The Christian reaction. Already Martin Luther had fought the Church of Rome with the Greek Testament. Greek was seen as a sacred Christian tongue which Protestants could plausibly claim was more Christian than Latin. Many French students of Ancient Greece in the 17th century were brought up as Huguenots. The study of Ancient Greece especially in Protestant countries created an alliance between Greece and Protestant Christianity which tended to exclude other influences.

The idea of progress. The antiquity of Egypt and Mesopotamia had previously made those civilizations particularly worthy of respect and admiration, but the emergence of the idea of progress portrayed later civilizations as more advanced and therefore better. Earlier cultures came to be seen as based on superstition and dogmatism.

Racism. The Atlantic slave trade and later European colonialism required the intellectual justification of racism. It became paramount to divorce Africans and Africa from high civilisation, and Egypt from Africa itself. Ancient Greeks would be divorced from Ancient Egypt through the concept of the Greek Miracle, and would be reclaimed as whites and Europeans.

Romanticism. Romantics saw humans as essentially divided in national or ethnic groups. The German philosopher Herder encouraged Germans to be proud of their origins, their language and their national characteristics or national genius. Romantics longed for small, virtuous and "pure" communities in remote and cold places: Switzerland, North Germany and Scotland. When considering the past, their natural choice was Greece. The Philhellenic movement led to new archaeological discoveries as well as contributed to the Greek War of Independence from the Ottoman Empire. Most Philhellenes were Romantics and Protestants.

== Reception ==
The original response to Bernal by Near Eastern scholars, historians, classicists, biological anthropologists, linguists, egyptologists and archaeologists was negative and critical. A 2013 article noted that Bernal's trilogy "has been an object of much ridicule and a little curiosity".

As of 1999, over 100 negative reviews had been published about Black Athena, as well as several books refuting its assertions. According to Jacques Berlinerblau:

By my rough estimate, negative scholarly reviews of Black Athena have outweighed positive or moderate ones by a margin of approximately seven to three. It might be inferred that this ratio testifies to the inherent implausibility of Bernal's hypotheses. After all, an ideologically disparate collection of academicians concur that Bernal's theories are simply untenable. Yet the existence of this scholarly consensus must be qualified by one telling fact. What is significant — note this — is that the majority of Bernal's defendants have emanated from the radical tier of the academic world.

Ronald H. Fritze expands on Berlinerblau's statement, writing that:

Actually, what seems even more significant, if one continues to believe in the existence of scholarly expertise and authority, is that most of Bernal's positive reviews were written by people who are not scholars of the classics, Egyptology, ancient Near Eastern history studies, archaeology or European intellectual history. As radicals they found Bernal's arguments to be politically congenial and they were not equipped or particularly interested in critically evaluating the evidence he presented. An observation of this nature raises the issues of authority, credentials and evidence – all aspects of the scholarly enterprise that Bernal seeks to ignore, minimize or reject.

According to Christina Riggs, Black Athena was embraced by Afrocentrists and postcolonial studies even as archaeology, Egyptology and classical scholarship rejected much of Bernal's evidence and, implicitly or explicitly, his central thesis.

There is no archaeological evidence that would clearly indicate a colonization which Bernal suggests. He himself says: "Here again, it should be made clear that, as with archaeological evidence, there are no smoking guns. There are no contemporary documents of the type 'X the Egyptian/Phoenician arrived at this place in Greece and established a city/kingdom (t)here', explicitly confirming the Ancient Model. Nor, for that matter, are there others denying it". Bernal also dedicates Black Athena to V. Gordon Childe and his book does fall into Childe's outdated paradigm of culture-historical archaeology. Michael Shanks criticized this outdated approach to archaeology stating:

Imagine a peasant in a Cretan field in the second millennium BC. Just because they come across things from a very different society does not mean they pack up and start building the extraordinary edifices archaeologists have called Minoan palaces. [...] What did the articles mean to the peasant? Were they considered as being from another 'society' at all? Perhaps the boundaries which we apply to the geography of the eastern Mediterranean are not sensible for understanding the second millennium BC when there was a widespread cultural mix joining Aegean, Levant and Egypt in a social system which included all three as essential components.

In her review "The Use and Abuse of Black Athena" Professor of Classics Molly Myerowitz Levine states that:

Volume 1 of Black Athena is an extraordinarily interesting and dangerous book: interesting in its sweeping sociology of the historiography of early Greece from the fifth century B.C.E. to the present; dangerous, because in reopening the nineteenth-century discourse on race and origins, the work, sadly, inevitably, has become part of the problem of racism rather than the solution that its author envisioned... every element of the enormously complex plot meshed perfectly to create a story with good guys (Herodotus, Egyptians, Semites) and bad guys (Aryans, racist German philologists); in which the hero-author, the indefatigable neophyte detective, rereads the files and reworks the clues to uncover the truth that had long been covered up by a contemptibly corrupt and lazy police department (contemporary classicists).

Paul Oskar Kristeller, writing in the Journal of the History of Ideas, states that Bernal’s work is full of gross errors and that it has not received the criticism it deserves due to political reasons.

Edith Hall criticized the fact that Bernal speaks of "Hellenic nationalism" and "national pride" in the 5th century BC despite the tensions between many Greek city-states, such as the long-standing hostility between Athens and Thebes and the Peloponnesian War.

The book also ignited a debate in the academic community. While some reviewers contend that studies of the origin of Greek civilization were tainted by a foundation of 19th-century racism, many have criticized Bernal for what they perceive to be the speculative nature of his hypothesis, unsystematic and linguistically incompetent handling of etymologies and a naive handling of ancient myth and historiography. The claims made in Black Athena were heavily questioned inter alia in Black Athena Revisited (1996), a collection of essays edited by Mary Lefkowitz and Guy MacLean Rogers.

Critics voice their strongest doubts over Bernal's approach to language and etymologies. Egyptologist John D. Ray has accused Bernal's work of having a confirmation bias. Edith Hall compares Bernal's thesis to the myth of the Olympian gods overwhelming the Titans and Giants, which was once thought of as a historical recollection of Homo sapiens taking over from Neanderthal man. She asserts that this historical approach to myth firmly belongs in the 19th century.

Others have challenged the lack of archaeological evidence for Bernal's thesis. Egyptologist James Weinstein points out that there is very little evidence that the ancient Egyptians were a colonizing people in the third millennium and second millennium BC. Furthermore, there is no evidence for Egyptian colonies of any sort in the Aegean world. Weinstein accuses Bernal of relying primarily on his interpretations of Greek myths as well as distorted interpretations of the archaeological and historical data.

Bernal has also been accused of pursuing political motives and enlisting Bronze Age Greece in an academic war against Western civilisation. Bernal stated in the introduction to Black Athena that the political purpose of the work "is, of course, to lessen European cultural arrogance". According to historian David Gress:

The truth is that the classicists had no problem whatsoever with Linear B, nor with Egyptian influence on Mycenae. What they could not and cannot accept, however, is continuity of Afroasiatic influences across the Dark Age—not because they are racists, but because all the evidence is against it… Bernals denunciations, delivered with a uniformly spiteful tone, give his work the same moral and scholarly status as the Aryan science of the Third Reich or the Lysenkoite genetics of Stalinist Russia; that is, none whatever.

In 2001, Bernal published Black Athena Writes Back: Martin Bernal Responds to Critics as a response to criticism of his earlier works. After the publication of this volume, according to scholar A.K Jayesh, "Bernal’s critics had realized the futility of their enterprise and given up: neither the response, nor the final instalment of Black Athena – aimed to furnish linguistic evidence for the claim that close to forty percent of the Greek vocabulary with no known Indo-European cognates has its roots, in fact, in Afroasiatic languages – elicited much of a response".

The Egyptologist John Baines has, while rejecting his overall thesis, praised Bernal for the fact that he studied ancient Greece in a wider cultural and geographical context, which Baines asserts classicists tend not to do. Thomas McEvilley concluded in 2002 that while Bernal's "analysis of earlier periods of anti-Semitic attitude in regard to ancient Near Eastern culture may remain valuable, his attempt ... to derive Greek philosophy from Africa seems so glaringly unsupported by evidence that it is likely to pass without leaving a trace."

Classicist and linguist Jean-Fabrice Nardelli, in one of the very few reviews of Black Athena's third volume, writes that Bernal's "faith in his ability to pinpoint sound shifts in (P)IE matching, or stemming from, Afroasiatic and in the rightness of multilateral lexical comparisons à la Greenberg over the standard comparative method, looks misplaced; for he has not checked his facts and stands at the mercy of sources notorious for their quirks and errors." He states that Bernal suffers from "proneness to blunders [which] further compromises his construct". Nardelli concludes that Bernal "applies no method but ad hoc reasoning based on contingency" and that "[t]he book is full of red herrings that betray its quality".

A number of archaeogenetic studies in the modern era have since refuted Bernal's hypotheses of an Egyptian or Phoenician colonisation of Greece. For instance, a 2017 study from Harvard University led by leading population geneticist Iosif Lazaridis, the full genomes of 19 Bronze Age individuals, including Minoans from Crete and Mycenaeans from mainland Greece were extracted and analysed. With regards to Bernal's claims, the authors concluded that:

Proposed migrations, such as settlement by Egyptian or Phoenician colonists, are not discernible in [the] data as there is no measurable Levantine or African influence in the Minoans and Mycenaeans, thus rejecting the hypothesis that the cultures of the Aegean were seeded by migrants from the old civilisations of these regions.

In a later study, however, Lazaridis et al. (2022) identified higher than average Levant Pre-Pottery Neolithic ancestry in an individual from Zakros.

Nevertheless, since 2010, other scholars have argued for the ongoing relevance of Bernal's work, even while disagreeing with many of its specifics. In African Athena: New Agendas (2011), the contributors argue that some of the issues that Bernal's books raise have been neglected until relatively recently. These researchers have begun to examine Bernal's trilogy through a different lens, arguing that it still holds some importance.

== Editions of Black Athena ==
=== Volume 1 ===
- Black Athena: The Afroasiatic Roots of Classical Civilization Rutgers University Press (1987) ISBN 0-8135-1277-8)
- Black Athena: Afro-Asiatic Roots of Classical Civilization: The Fabrication of Ancient Greece, 1785–1985 Vol. 1 (Paperback) Vintage; New Ed edition (21 Nov 1991) ISBN 978-0-09-988780-5
- Black Athena: Afro-Asiatic Roots of Classical Civilization: The Fabrication of Ancient Greece, 1785–1985 Vol. 1 (Paperback) Free Association Books (29 Nov 2004) ISBN 978-0-946960-56-9
- Black Athena: The Afroasiatic Roots of Classical Civilization: Volume I: The Fabrication of Ancient Greece, 1785-1985 (Paperback) Rutgers University Press Classics (2020) ISBN 978-1978804265

=== Volume 2 ===
- Black Athena: Afro-Asiatic Roots of Classical Civilization: The Archaeological and Documentary Evidence Vol. 2 (Paperback) Publisher: Free Association Books (1 Jan 1991) ISBN 978-1-85343-054-1
- Black Athena: the Afroasiatic Roots of Classical Civilization Vol. 2 (Hardcover) Rutgers University Press (Jul 1991) ISBN 978-0-8135-1584-7
- Black Athena: The Afroasiatic Roots of Classical Civilization: Volume II: The Archaeological and Documentary Evidence (Paperback) Rutgers University Press Classics (2020) ISBN 978-1978804272

=== Volume 3 ===
- Black Athena: The Afroasiatic Roots of Classical Civilization, Volume III: The Linguistic Evidence Rutgers University Press (25 Nov 2006) ISBN 978-0-8135-3655-2
- Black Athena: The Afroasiatic Roots of Classical Civilization, Volume III: The Linguistic Evidence Free Association Books (1 Feb 2006) ISBN 978-1-85343-799-1
- Black Athena: The Afroasiatic Roots of Classical Civilization, Volume III: The Linguistic Evidence Rutgers University Press Classics (2020) ISBN 978-1978804296

== Books and articles about Black Athena ==
- Black Athena 2: History without Rules. Robert L. Pounder The American Historical Review, Vol. 97, No. 2 (Apr., 1992), pp. 461–464 doi:10.2307/2165728.
- Mary R. Lefkowitz, Not Out of Africa: How Afrocentrism Became an Excuse to Teach Myth As History, 1997, ISBN 978-0-465-09838-5
- Mary R. Lefkowitz and Guy MacLean Rogers (eds.), Black Athena Revisited, 1996, ISBN 978-0-8078-4555-4
- Mary R. Lefkowitz, History Lesson, 2008, ISBN 978-0-300-12659-4
- Martin Bernal, Black Athena Writes Back: Martin Bernal Responds to His Critics, 2001.
- Jacques Berlinerblau, Heresy in the University: The Black Athena Controversy and the Responsibilities of American Intellectuals, 1999, ISBN 978-0-8135-2588-4
- van Binsbergen, Wim, ed. (2011). Black Athena Comes of Age: Towards a Constructive Re-Assessment. Berlin: Lit Verlag. ISBN 978-3-8258-4808-8.
- Skupin, Michael. "Anacalypsis II: A review of Black Athena Vol. I and II by Martin Bernal." Epigraphic Society Occasional Publications, Vol. 20 (1991), p. 28–29.
- Duncan Hallas, Absent Friends, Socialist Worker Review, 100 (1987)
- 1987 Black Athena The Afroasiatic Roots of Classical Civilization 1: The Fabrication of Ancient Greece 1785–1985. London: Free Association Books. and New Brunswick: Rutgers University.
- "Black Athena and the APA." in "The Challenge of Black Athena" Special issue of Arethusa. pp. 17–37.
- 1990 "Responses to Critical Reviews of Black Athena: Volume I: in the Journal of Mediterranean Archaeology 3/1:111- 137.
- 1991 Black Athena 2: The Archaeological and Documentary Evidence. London, Free Association Books; New Brunswick: Rutgers University.
- 1993 "Response", to "Dialogue: Martin Bernal's Black Athena." Journal of Women's History 4.3, (Winter):119–135.
- 1997 "Responses to Black Athena." Black Athena: Ten Years After. Special edition of Talanta vols. 28 and 29. pp. 65–99, 165–173 and 209–219.

== See also ==
- Black Egyptian hypothesis
- Life of Sethos
- Pre-Greek substrate

== Footnotes ==
=== Sources ===
- Fagan, Brian M.; Durrani, Nadia (2020). In the Beginning: An Introduction to Archaeology. Routledge. ISBN 9781351757676.
- Riggs, Christina (2014). Unwrapping Ancient Egypt. Bloomsbury Publishing. ISBN 9780857856777.
- Lefkowitz, Mary (2006). "Archaeology and the politics of origins: The search for pyramids in Greece". In Fagan, Garrett G. (ed.). Archaeological Fantasies: How Pseudoarchaeology Misrepresents the Past and Misleads the Public. Routledge. ISBN 9780415305921.
- Stiebing, William H.Jr; Helft, Susan N. (2023) [2003]. Ancient Near Eastern History and Culture. Taylor & Francis. ISBN 9781000880663.
- Shaw, Ian (2021). Ancient Egypt: A Very Short Introduction. Oxford University Press. ISBN 978-0-19-258421-2.
- Danver, Steven L. (2010). Popular Controversies in World History: Investigating History's Intriguing Questions [4 volumes]. Bloomsbury Publishing USA. ISBN 9781598840780.
