= George G. M. James =

Guyanese-American historian (1893–1956)

- Born: George Granville Monah James; November 9, 1893; Georgetown, Guyana
- Died: June 30, 1956 (aged 62)
- Education: Durham University; Columbia University
- Occupations: Historian and author
- Notable work: Stolen Legacy (1954)

George Granville Monah James (November 9, 1893 – June 30, 1956) was a Guyanese-American historian and author, known for his 1954 book Stolen Legacy, which argues that Greek philosophy and religion originated in ancient Egypt.

== Biography ==
James was born in Georgetown, Guyana. His parents were Reverend Linch B. and Margaret E. James. James earned bachelor's and master's degrees at Durham University in England and gained his doctorate at Columbia University in New York. He was Professor of Logic and Greek at Livingstone College in Salisbury, North Carolina, before working at Arkansas AM&N College in Pine Bluff, Arkansas. James died two years after publishing Stolen Legacy in 1954. James was a freemason and was associated with Prince Hall Freemasonry.

== Stolen Legacy ==
James was the author of Stolen Legacy: The Greeks Were Not the Authors of Greek Philosophy, But the People of North Africa, Commonly Called the Egyptians (also known as Stolen Legacy: Greek Philosophy is Stolen Egyptian Philosophy), first published in 1954. In this book, James claims that the ancient Greeks were not the original authors of Greek philosophy, but that ideas and concepts were stolen from the Ancient Egyptians when Alexander the Great "invaded Egypt and captured the Royal Library at Alexandria and plundered it", and that Aristotle's ideas came from these stolen books and that he established his school within the library. James also cites earlier Ancient Greek sources such as Herodotus who describe the cultural debt of Greece to Egypt. He also mentions prominent Greek philosophers such as Pythagoras and Plato who are said to have studied in Egypt.

The book draws on the writings of freemasonry to support its claim that the Greco-Roman mysteries originate from an "Egyptian Mystery System", (Note: James's chief reference on the Egyptian mysteries is C. H. Vail, author of Ancient Mysteries and Modern Masonry (1909). Vail's source is Morals and Dogma of the Ancient and Accepted Scottish Rite of Freemasonry (1872) by Albert Pike.) although as historians point out, James does not cite these sources accurately.

=== Criticism ===
Stolen Legacy and its thesis have generally been considered pseudohistory by historians. Historians Wilson J. Moses, Albert Gelpi, Mary Lefkowitz, Ronald H. Fritze and philosopher Robert Todd Carroll all call the book and its claims pseudohistorical. Carroll writes that:

James's principal sources were Masonic, especially The Ancient Mysteries and Modern Masonry (1909) by the Rev. Charles H. Vail. The Masons in turn derived their misconceptions about Egyptian mystery and initiation rites from the eighteenth century work of fiction Sethos [...] (1731) by the Abbe Jean Terrasson (1670-1750), a professor of Greek. Terrasson had no access to Egyptian sources and he would be long dead before Egyptian hieroglyphics could be deciphered. But Terrasson knew the Greek and Latin writers well. So he constructed an imaginary Egyptian religion based upon sources that described Greek and Latin rites as if they were Egyptian [...] Hence one of the main sources for Afrocentric Egyptology turns out to be Greece and Rome. The Greeks would have called this irony. I don't know what Afrocentrists call it.

Philosopher Ronald B. Levinson dismissed the book in a 1955 review, writing that "only social psychologists and collectors of paradoxes will find here grist for their mills" and presenting some of James's claims as self-evidently ridiculous. Historian Stephen Howe wrote that the book "is a work of utmost intellectual naivety, innocent of even the outward appearances of academic procedure".

Professor of philosophy Kristian Urstad, reviewing the book in the academic journal Kritike, states that it is not a genuine work of scholarship, but rather "a plea for justice and reformation, a call to turn the tide of racism washing over his time". He writes that:

Though one can appreciate what James was trying to do for African people and tradition, especially given the context in which this work was written, this is a book wrought with historical inaccuracies, sketchy dating, dubious referencing, and philosophical misunderstandings. [...] James claims that Democritus did not write those books commonly attributed to him. Instead, he came to possess them from Anaxarchus, who had brought them back from the Egyptian Library, a library sacked and looted during Alexander's conquest of Egypt (a campaign that Anaxarchus was a part of). The author’s claim here is altogether historically erroneous. Democritus was born eighty or so years before Anaxarchus and would have been dead forty years before Anaxarchus’ return to Ionia. Similar cases of (glaring) historical negligence are rife throughout James’ book.

In the 1990s, classics professor Mary Lefkowitz emerged as a prominent critic of Afrocentrism and of James. Her critique of Stolen Legacy showed that the book tries to look scholarly but is ultimately a pseudohistory that is disingenuous and extremely tendentious in its conclusions. Lefkowitz makes the following arguments:

- Ancient Egypt was racially mixed (and therefore its cultural legacy does not represent an inherently "black" or "African" contribution).
- Stolen Legacy is unscholarly, relying heavily on repetition of claims about Alexander's "theft" of Egyptian material, and lacking precise footnoting.
- Alexandria was founded after Alexander's conquest of Egypt and never integrated into Egyptian society, and the Library of Alexandria was built still later; therefore, it contained no repository of Egyptian culture for the immigrant Greeks to steal.
- James misrepresents his masonic sources, who in discussing the "Egyptian mysteries" actually mean Greco-Roman mysteries operating in Egypt, and cites other outdated sources on Egypt that do not take modern scholarship into account. ("Thus most ironically," she writes, "the 'Egyptian Mystery System' described by James is not African, but essentially Greek, and in its details, specifically European.")
- The Egyptian writings (notably the Hermetic Corpus) that James presents as predecessors to Greek philosophy were composed in the Hellenistic period.
- Similarities found by ancient writers between Greek and Egyptian deities do not imply Egyptian origin. Egyptian philosophy does not include a doctrine of transmigration of souls. Other purported connections in mathematics, science, and philosophy are also insubstantial.
- The great philosophers Socrates and Aristotle are not said to have traveled to Egypt.

The book received positive responses by Afrocentrist authors despite the harsh criticism by historians and other scholars. Afrocentrist author William Leo Hansberry wrote in support of the book's key premises, including its conclusion that the Greeks stole the knowledge of the Egyptians.Stolen Legacy has strongly influenced the Afrocentric school of history, including leading exponents such as Asa Hillaird, Yosef Ben-Jochannan and Molefi Kete Asante.
