= Runoko Rashidi =

Afro-centrist American author (1954–2021)

- Born: Ronnie Ross; August 16, 1954
- Died: August 2, 2021 (aged 66)
- Occupations: Historian; researcher; essayist; author; activist
- Website: drrunoko.com

Runoko Rashidi (born Ronnie Ross and later known as Ronald Lamar; 16 August 1954 – 2 August 2021) was an Afro-centrist, essayist, author and public lecturer based in Los Angeles, California, and Paris, France.

== Career ==
Rashidi was a writer and speaker who researched and lectured on Ancient Africa, the alleged African presence in prehistoric America, and the African presence in Asia and other parts of the world.

Rashidi is the author of Introduction to the Study of African Classical Civilizations] (1993) and the editor of Unchained African Voices, a collection of poetry and prose by death row inmates at California's San Quentin State Prison. He is also the author or editor of 18 books, including The African Presence in Early Asia (1985, 1988, 1995), with Ivan Van Sertima, Black Star: The African Presence in Early Europe (2012) and African Star over Asia: The Black Presence in the East (2013).

Over the course of his career, Rashidi was involved in drawing Black American attention to the history and plight of India's Dalit population. He worked with activist V.T. Rajshekar, contributing to the book Dalit: The Black Untouchables of India (1987).

Rashidi was a member of the editorial board of Africology: The Journal of Pan African Studies. He also supported the work of controversial scholars like the late Ivan Van Sertima.

Rashidi died on August 2, 2021, while on a tour of Egypt.

== See also ==
- Afrocentricity/Afrocentrism
- Pan Africanism
- Martin Bernal
- John Henrik Clarke
- John G. Jackson (writer)
