= Luxorius =

Luxorius may refer to:

- Luxorius (saint), an Ancient Roman official on Sardinia in the late 3rd and early 4th centuries
- Luxorius (poet), a Roman poet and writer in the 6th century
