= Afrocentrism =

African ethnocentrism

Afrocentrism is a racialized worldview that is centered on the history of people of Black African descent or a view that favors it over non-African civilizations. It is in some respects a response to Eurocentric attitudes about African people and their historical contributions. It seeks to counter what it sees as mistakes and ideas perpetuated by the racist philosophical underpinnings of Western academic disciplines as they developed during and since Europe's Early Renaissance as justifying rationales for the enslavement of other peoples, in order to enable more accurate accounts of not only African but all people's contributions to world history. Afrocentricity deals primarily with self-determination and African agency and is a pan-African point of view for the study of culture, philosophy, and history.

What is today broadly called Afrocentrism evolved out of the work of African American intellectuals in the late nineteenth and early twentieth centuries, but flowered into its modern form due to the activism of African American intellectuals in the U.S. civil rights movement and in the development of African American studies programs in universities. However, following the development of universities in African colonies in the 1950s, African scholars became major contributors to African historiography. A notable pioneer is the professor Kenneth Dike, who became chairman of the Committee on African Studies at Harvard in the 1970s. In strict terms Afrocentrism, as a distinct historiography, reached its peak in the 1980s and 1990s. Today it is primarily associated with Cheikh Anta Diop, John Henrik Clarke, Ivan van Sertima and Molefi Kete Asante. Asante, however, describes his theories as Afrocentricity.

Proponents of Afrocentrism support the claim that the contributions of various Black African people have been downplayed or discredited as part of the legacy of colonialism and slavery's pathology of "writing Africans out of history".

Major critics of Afrocentrism include Mary Lefkowitz, who dismiss it as pseudohistory, reactive, and obstinately therapeutic. Others, such as Kwame Anthony Appiah, believe that Afrocentrism defeats its purpose of dismantling unipolar studies of world history by seeking to replace Eurocentricity with an equally ethnocentric and hierarchical curriculum, and negatively essentializes European culture and people of European descent. Clarence E. Walker claims it to be "Eurocentrism in blackface".

== Terminology ==
The term "Afrocentrism" dates to 1962. The adjective "Afrocentric" appears in a typescript proposal for an entry in Encyclopedia Africana, possibly due to W. E. B. Du Bois. The abstract noun "Afrocentricity" dates to the 1970s, and was popularized by Molefi Asante's Afrocentricity: The Theory of Social Change (1980). Molefi Kete Asante's theory, Afrocentricity, has been one developed in academic settings and may incorporate the terms Afrocentric to describe scholarship and Afrocentrists to describe scholars, but does not use Afrocentrism. According to Asante, though the two terms are often confused to mean the same, Afrocentrists are not adherents of Afrocentrism. This has caused confusing notions about who is considered an Afrocentrist, as various scholars who may or may not be associated with Asante and his works have been erroneously given the title, even by other academics. Asante has written that Afrocentricity and Afrocentrism are not the same and neither do they share the same origin:

By way of distinction, Afrocentricity should not be confused with the variant Afrocentrism. The term "Afrocentrism" was first used by the opponents of Afrocentricity who in their zeal saw it as an obverse of Eurocentrism. The adjective "Afrocentric" in the academic literature always referred to "Afrocentricity." However, the use of "Afrocentrism" reflected a negation of the idea of Afrocentricity as a positive and progressive paradigm. The aim was to assign religious signification to the idea of African centeredness. However, it has come to refer to a broad cultural movement of the late twentieth century that has a set of philosophical, political, and artistic ideas which provides the basis for the musical, sartorial, and aesthetic dimensions of the African personality. On the other hand, Afrocentricity, as I have previously defined it, is a theory of agency, that is, the idea that African people must be viewed and view themselves as agents rather than spectators to historical revolution and change. To this end Afrocentricity seeks to examine every aspect of the subject place of Africans in historical, literary, architectural, ethical, philosophical, economic, and political life.

== History ==
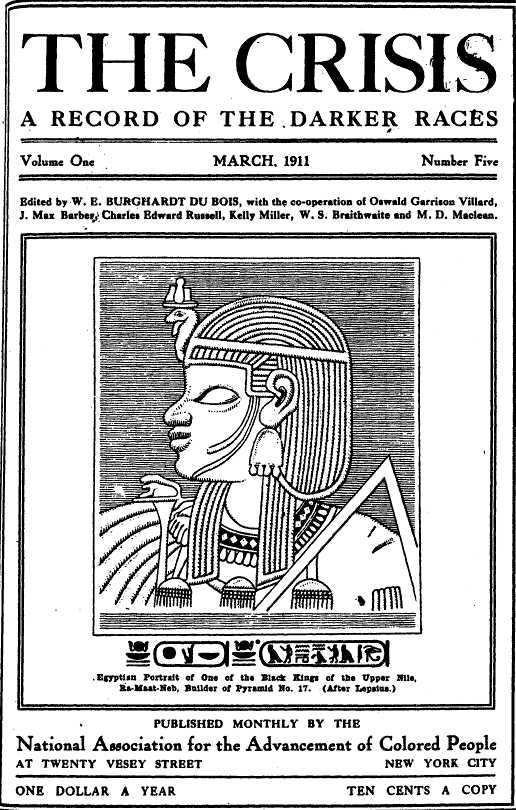
A 1911 copy of the NAACP journal The Crisis depicting "Ra-Maat-Neb, one of the kings of the Upper Nile", a copy of the relief portraying Nebmaatre I on Meroe pyramid 17

Afrocentrism has its origins in the work of African and African diaspora intellectuals in the late 19th and early 20th centuries, following social changes in the United States and Africa due both to the end of slavery and the decline of colonialism. Following the American Civil War, African Americans in the South gathered together in communities to evade white control, established their own church congregations, and worked hard to gain education. They increasingly took more active public roles despite severe racial discrimination and segregation. American and African intellectuals looked to the African past for a re-evaluation of what its civilizations had achieved and what they meant for contemporary people.

The combination of the European centuries gives us about four to five hundred years of solid European domination of intellectual concepts and philosophical ideas. Africa and Asia were subsumed under various headings of the European hierarchy. If a war between the European powers occurred it was called a World War and the Asians and Africans found their way on the side of one European power or the other. There was this sense of assertiveness about European culture that advanced with Europe's trade, religious, and military forces.

— Molefi Asante, "De-Westernizing Communication: Strategies for Neutralizing Cultural Myths"

As a racist ideology and political movement, Afrocentrism had its beginnings in activism among black intellectuals, political figures, and historians in the context of the US American civil rights movement. According to U.S. professor Victor Oguejiofor Okafor, concepts of Afrocentricity lie at the core of disciplines such as African American studies. But Wilson J. Moses claims that Afrocentrism roots are not exclusively African:

Despite the fulminations of ethno-chauvinists and other prejudiced persons, it remains a fact that the contributions of white scholars, like Boas, Malinowski, and Herskovits, were fundamental to that complex of ideas that we designate to days as Afrocentrism...Students of African and African American history have long appreciated the irony that much of what we now call Afrocentrism was developed during the 1930s by the Jewish American scholar Melville Herskovits

— Wilson J. Moses, Historical Sketches of Afrocentrism

== Aspects of Afrocentricity and Afrocentrism ==
=== Afrocentricity (2000) by Molefi Kete Asante ===
In 2000, African American Studies professor Molefi Kete Asante, gave a lecture entitled "Afrocentricity: Toward a New Understanding of African Thought in this Millennium," in which he presented many of his ideas:

- Africa has been betrayed by international commerce, by missionaries and imams, by the structure of knowledge imposed by the Western world, by its own leaders, and by the ignorance of its own people of its past.
- Philosophy originated in Africa and the first philosophers in the world were Africans.
- Afrocentricity constitutes a new way of examining data, and a novel orientation to data; it carries with it assumptions about the current state of the African world.
- His aim is "to help lay out a plan for the recovery of African place, respectability, accountability, and leadership."
- Afrocentricity can stand its ground among any ideology or religion: Marxism, Islam, Christianity, Buddhism, or Judaism. Your Afrocentricity will emerge in the presence of these other ideologies because it is from you.
- Afrocentrism is the only ideology that can liberate African people.

Asante also stated:

As a cultural configuration, the Afrocentric idea is distinguished by five characteristics:

1. an intense interest in psychological location as determined by symbols, motifs, rituals, and signs.
2. a commitment to finding the subject-place of Africans in any social, political, economic, or religious phenomenon with implications for questions of sex, gender, and class.
3. a defence of African cultural elements as historically valid in the context of art, music, and literature.
4. a celebration of centeredness and agency and a commitment to lexical refinement that eliminates pejoratives about Africans or other people.
5. a powerful imperative from historical sources to revise the collective text of African people.

=== Afrocentric education ===
Afrocentric education is education designed to empower peoples of the African diaspora. A central premise behind it is that many Africans have been subjugated by limiting their awareness of themselves and indoctrinating them with ideas that work against them. To control a people's culture is to control their tools of self-determination in relationship to others. Like educational leaders of other cultures, proponents assert that what educates one group of people does not necessarily educate and empower another group–so they assert educational priorities distinctly for the Africans in a given context.

=== Afrocentric theology ===
The black church in the United States developed out of the creolization of African spirituality and European-American Christianity; early members of the churches made certain stories their own. During the antebellum years, the idea of deliverance out of slavery, as in the story of Exodus, was especially important. After Reconstruction and the restoration of white supremacy, their hope was based on deliverance from segregation and other abuses. They found much to respond to in the idea of a personal relationship with Jesus, and shaped their churches by the growth of music and worship styles that related to African as well as European-American traditions.

Twentieth-century "Africentric approaches" to Christian theology and preaching have been more deliberate. Writers and thinkers emphasize "Black presence" in the Christian Bible, including the idea of a "Black Jesus".

=== Kwanzaa ===
In 1966 Maulana Karenga of the black separatist US Organization created Kwanzaa; which became the first specifically African American holiday to be widely observed amongst African Americans. Karenga rejected liberation theology and considered the practice of Christianity anti-thetical to the creation of an African-American identity independent from white America. Karenga said his goal was to "give Blacks an alternative to the existing holiday and give Blacks an opportunity to celebrate themselves and history, rather than simply imitate the practice of the dominant society."

=== Race and Pan-African identity ===
Many Afrocentrists seek to challenge concepts such as white privilege, color-blind perspectives, and race-neutral pedagogies. There are strong ties between Afrocentricity and Critical race theory.

Afrocentrists agree with the current scientific consensus that holds that Africans exhibit a range of types and physical characteristics, and that such elements as wavy hair or aquiline facial features are part of a continuum of African types that do not depend on admixture with Caucasian groups. They cite work by Hiernaux and Hassan that they believe demonstrates that populations could vary based on micro-evolutionary principles (climate adaptation, drift, selection), and that such variations existed in both living and fossil Africans.

Afrocentrists have condemned what they consider to be attempts at dividing African peoples into racial clusters as new versions of discredited theories, such as the Hamitic hypothesis and the Dynastic Race Theory. These theories, they contend, attempted to identify certain African ethnicities, such as Nubians, Ethiopians and Somalis, as "Caucasoid" groups that entered Africa to bring civilization to the natives. They believe that Western academics have traditionally limited the peoples they defined as "Black" Africans to those south of the Sahara, but used broader "Caucasoid" or related categories to classify peoples of Egypt or North Africa. Afrocentrists also believe strongly in the work of certain anthropologists who have suggested that there is little evidence to support that the first North African populations were closely related to "Caucasoids" of Europe and western Asia.

In 1964 Afrocentric scholar Cheikh Anta Diop expressed a belief in such a double standard:

But it is only the most gratuitous theory that considers the Dinka, the Nouer and the Masai, among others, to be Caucasoids. What if an African ethnologist were to persist in recognising as white only the blond, blue-eyed Scandinavians, and systematically refused membership to the remaining Europeans, and Mediterraneans in particular—the French, Italians, Greek, Spanish, and Portuguese? Just as the inhabitants of Scandinavia and the Mediterranean countries must be considered as two extreme poles of the same anthropological reality, so should the Negroes of East and West Africa be considered as the two extremes in the reality of the Negro world. To say that a Shillouk, a Dinka, or a Nouer is a Caucasoid is for an African as devoid of sense and scientific interest as would be, to a European, an attitude that maintained that a Greek or a Latin were not of the same race.

French historian Jean Vercoutter has claimed that archaeological workers routinely classified Negroid remains as Mediterranean, even though they found such remains in substantial numbers with ancient artefacts.

Some Afrocentrists have adopted a pan-Africanist perspective that people of color are all "African people" or "diasporic Africans," citing physical characteristics they exhibit in common with Black Africans. Afrocentric scholar Runoko Rashidi writes that they are all part of the "global African community." Some Afrocentric writers include in the African diaspora the Dravidians of India, "Negritos" of Southeast Asia (Thailand, the Philippines and Malaysia); and the aboriginal peoples of Australia and Melanesia.

=== Pre-Columbian Africa-Americas theories ===
In the 1970s, Ivan van Sertima advanced the theory that the complex civilizations of the Americas were the result of trans-oceanic influence from the Egyptians or other African civilizations. Such a claim is his primary thesis in They Came Before Columbus, published in 1978. The few hyper-diffusionist writers seek to establish that the Olmec people, who built the first highly complex civilization in Mesoamerica and are considered by some to be the mother civilization for all other civilizations of Mesoamerica, were deeply influenced by Africans. Van Sertima said that the Olmec civilization was a hybrid one of Africans and Native Americans. His theory of pre-Columbian American-African contact has since met with considerable and detailed opposition by scholars of Mesoamerica. Van Sertima has been accused of "doctoring" and twisting data to fit his conclusions, inventing evidence, and ignoring the work of respected Central and South American scholars to advance his own theory. Mainstream historians of Mesoamerica overwhelmingly reject that view with detailed rebuttals.

Claims have been also forwarded contending that African civilizations were founding influences on the Chinese Xia cultures.

=== Afrocentrism and Ancient Egypt ===
Several Afrocentrists have claimed that important cultural characteristics of ancient Egypt were indigenous to Africa and that these features were present in other early African civilizations such as the later Kerma and the Meroitic civilizations of Nubia. Scholars who have held this view include Marcus Garvey, George James, Martin Bernal, Ivan van Sertima, John Henrik Clarke, and Molefi Kete Asante as well as the Afrocentrist writers Cheikh Anta Diop and Chancellor Williams. The claim has also been made by many Afrocentric scholars that the Ancient Egyptians themselves were Black African (sub-saharan African) rather than North African/Maghrebi, and that the various invasions on Egypt resulted in the "Africanity" of Ancient Egypt becoming diluted, resulting in the modern diversity seen today. Examining this view, Egyptologist Stuart Tyson Smith, wrote that "Any characterization of race of the ancient Egyptians depends on modern cultural definitions, not on scientific study. Thus, by modern American standards it is reasonable to characterise the Egyptians as 'black', while acknowledging the scientific evidence for the physical diversity of Africans". Smith, however, expressed criticism of Egyptologists and Afrocentrists that defined ancient Egyptians "as members of an essentialist racial category" with perceived "Caucasoid" or "Negroid/Africoid" phenotypes".

As historian Ronald H. Fritze argued, mainstream Egyptologists and other scholars strongly object to Afrocentric Egyptology, viewing it as "theurapetic mythology" for black people, since it fails to provide sufficient evidence or persuasive interpretations to back up its claims.

Stephen Howe, professor in the history and cultures of colonialism at Bristol University, writes that contrary to "Afrocentric speculation, depending on undocumented assertions that the relatively light-skinned people of the lower Nile today descend from Arab conquerors rather than earlier residents". Howe also cited a 1995 publication which stated "the latest major synthetic work on African populations is firmly of the opinion that "It was not the Arabs physically displaced Egyptians. Instead the Egyptians were transformed by relatively small number of immigrants bringing in new ideas, which, when disseminated, created a wider ethnic identity".

S.O.Y. Keita, a biological anthropologist and research affiliate at the Smithsonian Institution who has been described as sympathetic to Afrocentrism, but defined his position as that "it is not a question of "African" "influence"; Ancient Egypt was organically African. Studying early Egypt in its African context is not "Afrocentric," but simply correct". Keita has argued that the original inhabitants of the Nile Valley were primarily a variety of indigenous Northeast Africans from the areas of the desiccating Sahara and more southerly areas. He reviewed studies on the biological affinities of the Ancient Egyptian population and described the skeletal morphologies of early dynastic Egyptian remains as a "Saharo-tropical African variant". He also noted that over time gene flow from the Near East and Europe added more genetic variability to the region. In 2022, Keita argued that some genetic studies have a "default racialist or racist approach" and should be interpreted in a framework with other sources of evidence. Several other academics, including Christopher Ehret, Fekri Hassan, Bruce Williams, Frank Yurco, Molefi Kete Asante, Lanny Bell and A.J. Boyce across various disciplines have contended that Ancient Egypt was fundamentally an African civilization, with cultural and biological connections to Egypt's African neighbors.

Scholars have challenged the various assertions of Afrocentrists on the cultural and biological characteristics of Ancient Egyptian civilization and its people. At a UNESCO Symposium in the 1970s, some of the participants, including Jean Vercoutter, Serge Sauneron, Gunnar Säve-Söderbergh and Jean Leclant expressed "profound" disagreement with the "Black", homogeneous hypothesis. Despite contestations, UNESCO decided to include his "Origin of the ancient Egyptians" in the General History of Africa, with an editorial comment mentioning the disagreement. However, Diop's chapter was credited as a "painstakingly researched contribution" in the general conclusion of the symposium report by the International Scientific Committee's Rapporteur, Professor Jean Devisse, which nevertheless lead to a "real lack of balance" in the discussion among participants. The ancient world did not employ racial categories such as "Black" or "White" as they had no conception of "race", but rather labeled groups according to their land of origin and cultural traits. However, Keita studying the controversy, finds simplistic political appellations (in the negative or affirmative) describing ancient populations as "black" or "white" to be inaccurate and instead focuses on the ancestry of ancient Egypt as being a part of the native and diverse biological variation of Africa, which includes a variety of phenotypes and skin gradients.

Egyptian Egyptologist Zahi Hawass has gone on record as saying that the Ancient Egyptians were not black and "We believe that the origin of Ancient Egyptians was purely Egyptian based on the discovery made by British Egyptologist Flinders Petrie at Naqada, and this is why the Ancient Egyptian civilisation did not occur in Africa, it occurred only here". In 2022, Hawass reiterated his view that "Africans have nothing to do with the pyramids scientifically" and stated that Africans "ruled in Egypt in the late Era, at the time of the 25th dynasty". Hawass also accused some international figures of African descent that promoted Afrocentrism of racism and fabrication of Egyptian history.

In 2008, Stuart Tyson Smith expressed criticism of a facial reconstruction of Tutankhamun as "very light-skinned" which reflected "bias" and "predictably and justifiably, it has provoked protests from Afrocentrists" as "Egyptologists have been strangely reluctant to admit that the ancient Egyptians were rather dark-skinned Africans, especially the farther south one goes".

In 2011, Stephen Quirke, professor of Egyptian Archaeology and Philology argued that the UNESCO-sponsored conference on the General History of Africa in 1974 "did not change the Eurocentric climate of research" and of the need to incorporate both African-centred studies and White European, academic perspectives. He later outlined that "research conferences and publications on the history and language of Kemet [Egypt] remain dominated ... by those brought up and trained in European, not African societies and languages (which include Arabic)".

=== African-American Afrocentric "hoteps" and the far-right ===
African-Americans who use the Black Egyptian hypothesis as a source of black pride have been called "the hoteps" (after the Egyptian word hotep). The term has often been used disparagingly by non-hotep African-Americans, some of whom have linked the ideology of the hotep community – which is anti-feminist, anti-gay and anti-Semitic – to the far-right. Hoteps have been described as promoting false histories and misinformation about black people and black history. Some have argued hotep beliefs are too narrow-minded (focusing only on Egypt as opposed to other aspects of African history), and black feminists argue that hoteps perpetuate rape culture by policing women's sexuality and not criticizing predatory black men.

=== Alkebulan ===
Among Afrocentrists the name 'Alkebulan' (also spelled 'Al Kebulan' or 'Alkebu Lan') is sometimes used a replacement for 'Africa.' Users often erroneously claim that it derives from the Arabic for 'Land of the Blacks' (in reality Bilad as-Sudan), or alternatively that it comes from one or more indigenous African languages and means 'Garden of Life' or 'Motherland'. In the 20th century it was popularized by Yosef Ben-Jochannan, though this is sometimes incorrectly credited to Cheikh Anta Diop in a non-existent book called "The Kemetic History of Afrika".

== Reception ==
Afrocentrism has encountered opposition from mainstream scholars who charge it with historical inaccuracy, scholarly ineptitude, and racism.

Yaacov Shavit, a critic of the movement, summarises its goals in the preface to his book History in Black, in which he states:

Thus, if historical myths and legends, or an invented history, play such a major role in the founding of every national reconstruction, the question that should concern us here is the nature of the distinct style in which black Americans imagine their past. The answer to this question is that radical Afrocentrism, the subject of this study, which plays a central role in shaping the modern historical world-view of a large section of the African-American (or Afro-American) community, is far more than an effort to follow the line taken by many ethnic groups and nations in modern rewriting, inventing or developing collective identity and national history. Rather, it is a large-scale historical project to rewrite the history of the whole of humankind from an Afrocentric point of view. The result is a new reconstruction of world history: it is a universal history.

Other critics, such as Mary Lefkowitz, contend that the Afrocentric historical approach is entrenched in myth and fantasy. She argues that Afrocentrism is grounded in identity politics and myth rather than sound scholarship. In The Skeptic's Dictionary, philosophy professor Robert Todd Carroll labeled Afrocentrism "pseudohistorical". He argued that Afrocentrism's prime goal was to encourage black nationalism and ethnic pride in order to effectively combat the destructive consequences of cultural and universal racism. Professor of history Clarence E. Walker has described Afrocentrism as "a mythology that is racist, reactionary, essentially therapeutic" and "Eurocentrism in black face."

Classicist Mary Lefkowitz rejects George James's theories about Egyptian contributions to Greek civilization as being faulty scholarship. She writes that ancient Egyptian texts show little similarity to Greek philosophy. Lefkowitz states that Aristotle could not have stolen his ideas from the great Library at Alexandria as James suggested, because the library was founded after Aristotle's death. On the basis of such errors, Lefkowitz calls Afrocentrism "an excuse to teach myth as history." Mary Lefkowitz in 1997 whilst criticising elements of Afrocentrism had acknowledged that the origins of the ancient Egyptians were more clear due to the "recent evidence on skeletons and DNA [which] suggests that the people who settled in the Nile valley, like all of humankind, came from somewhere south of the Sahara; they were not (as some nineteenth-century scholars had supposed) invaders from the North."

In 2002, Ibrahim Sundiata wrote in the American Historical Review that:

The word "Afrocentric" has been traced by Derrick Alridge to the American historian W.E.B. Du Bois, who employed it in the early 1960s. During the 1970s, Molefi Kete Asante appropriated the term, insisting that he was the only person equipped to define it, and asserting that even the holy archangels Du Bois and Cheikh Anta Diop had an imperfect and immature grasp of a concept that finds ultimate expression in his own pontifications. Subsequently, it became a catchall "floating signifier," nebulous, unstable, and infinitely mutable.

Literature and languages scholar Cain Hope Felder, a supporter of Afrocentric ideas, has warned Afrocentrists to avoid certain pitfalls, including:

- Demonizing categorically all white people, without careful differentiation between persons of goodwill and those who consciously perpetuate racism.
- Adopting multiculturalism as a curricular alternative that eliminates, marginalizes, or vilifies European heritage to the point that Europe epitomizes all the evil in the world.
- Gross over-generalizations and using factually or incorrect material is bad history and bad scholarship.

Nathan Glazer writes that although Afrocentricity can mean many things, the popular press has generally given most attention to its most outlandish theories. Glazer agrees with many of the findings and conclusions presented in Lefkowitz's book Not Out of Africa. Yet he also argues that Afrocentrism often presents legitimate and relevant scholarship. The late Manning Marable was also a critic of Afrocentrism. He wrote:

Populist Afrocentrism was the perfect social theory for the upwardly mobile black petty bourgeoisie. It gave them a sense of ethnic superiority and cultural originality, without requiring the hard, critical study of historical realities. It provided a philosophical blueprint to avoid concrete struggle within the real world... It was, in short, only the latest theoretical construct of a politics of racial identity, a world-view designed to discuss the world but never really to change it.

Some Afrocentrists agree in rejecting those works which critics have characterized as examples of bad scholarship. Adisa A. Alkebulan states that the work of Afrocentric scholars is not fully appreciated because critics use the claims of "a few non-Afrocentrists" as "an indictment against Afrocentricity."

In 1996, the historian August Meier critically reviewed the new work of Mary Lefkowitz on Afrocentrism as "Eurocentric". He criticized her book Not Out of Africa: How Afrocentrism Became an Excuse to Teach Myth as History for what he saw as her neglect of the African-American historic literature of the 19th and 20th centuries. Meier believes she fails to take the African-American experiences into account, to the extent that she "fails to answer the question raised in this book's subtitle."

Maghan Keita describes the controversy over Afrocentrism as a cultural war. He believes certain "epistemologies" are warring with each other: the "epistemology of blackness" argues for the "responsibilities and potential of black peoples to function in and contribute to the progress of civilization."

== List of prominent authors ==
- Marimba Ani, professor, author and activist: Yurugu: An Afrikan-centered Critique of European Cultural Thought and Behavior (Trenton: Africa World Press, 1994).
- Molefi Kete Asante, professor, author: Afrocentricity: The Theory of Social Change; The Afrocentric Idea; The Egyptian Philosophers: Ancient African Voices from Imhotep to Akhenaten
- Jacob Carruthers, Egyptologist; founding director of the Association for the Study of Classical African Civilization; founder and director of the Kemetic Institute, Chicago
- Cheikh Anta Diop, author: The African Origin of Civilization: Myth or Reality; Civilization or Barbarism: An Authentic Anthropology; Precolonial Black Africa; The Cultural Unity of Black Africa: The Domains of Patriarchy and of Matriarchy in Classical Antiquity; The Peopling of Ancient Egypt & the Deciphering of the Meroitic Script
- Yosef Ben-Jochannan, author: African Origins of Major "Western Religions"; Black Man of the Nile and His Family; Africa: Mother of Western Civilization; New Dimensions in African History; The Myth of Exodus and Genesis and the Exclusion of Their African Origins; Abu Simbel to Ghizeh: A Guide Book and Manual
- Jones, Gayl (1998). The Healing. Boston: Beacon Press. ISBN 978-0-8070-6314-9. The protagonist of this novel describes her ongoing daily experiences in the US using a consistently Afrocentric perspective.
- Runoko Rashidi, author: Introduction to African Civilizations; The global African community: The African presence in Asia, Australia, and the South Pacific
- J.A. Rogers, author: Sex and Race: Negro-Caucasian Mixing in All Ages and All Lands: The Old World; Nature Knows No Color Line; Sex and Race: A History of White, Negro, and Indian Miscegenation in the Two Americas: The New World; 100 Amazing Facts About the Negro With Complete Proof: A Short Cut to the World History of the Negro
- Ivan van Sertima, author: They Came before Columbus: The African Presence in Ancient America, African Presence in Early Europe ISBN 0-88738-664-4; Blacks in Science Ancient and Modern; African Presence in Early Asia; African Presence in Early America; Early America Revisited; Egypt Revisited: Journal of African Civilizations; Nile Valley Civilizations; Egypt: Child of Africa (Journal of African Civilizations, V. 12); The Golden Age of the Moor (Journal of African Civilizations, Vol. 11, Fall 1991); Great Black Leaders: Ancient and Modern; Great African Thinkers: Cheikh Anta Diop
- Chancellor Williams, author: The Destruction of Black Civilization: Great Issues of a Race from 4500 B.C. to 2000 A.D.
- Théophile Obenga, author: Ancient Egypt and Black Africa: a student's handbook for the study of Ancient Egypt in philosophy, linguistics, and gender relations
- Asa Hilliard, III, author: SBA: The Reawakening of the African Mind; The Teachings of Ptahhotep

== See also ==
- "Out of Africa" theory
- African-American culture
- African philosophy
- African Renaissance
- Anti-Europeanism
- Americentrism
- Asiacentrism
- Basking in reflected glory
- Black orientalism
- Black supremacy
- Ethnocentrism
- Nationalism and archaeology
- Négritude
- Nuwaubian Nation
- Pseudohistory
- Race and ethnicity in the United States
- Reverse discrimination
- Blaxit

== Literature ==
=== Primary ===
- Ani, Marimba (1994). Yurugu: An African-centered Critique of European Thought and Behavior. Trenton, N.J.: Africa World Press. ISBN 0-86543-248-1.
- Asante, Molefi Kete (1988). Afrocentricity (rev. ed.). Trenton, N.J.: Africa World Press. ISBN 0-86543-067-5.
- Asante, Molefi Kete (1990). Kemet, Afrocentricity, and Knowledge. Trenton, N.J.: Africa World Press. ISBN 0-86543-188-4.
- Asante, Molefi Kete (1998). The Afrocentric Idea. Philadelphia: Temple University Press. ISBN 1-56639-594-1.
- Asante, Molefi Kete (2007). An Afrocentric Manifesto. Cambridge: Polity Press. ISBN 978-07456-4102-7
- Karenga, Maulana (1993). Introduction to Black Studies (2nd ed.). Los Angeles: University of Sankore Press. ISBN 0-943412-16-1.
- Kershaw, Terry (1992). ""Afrocentrism and the Afrocentric method." Western Journal of Black Studies". 16 (3): 160–168.

=== Secondary ===
- Adeleke, Tunde. (2009). The Case Against Afrocentrism. University Press of Mississippi. ISBN 978-1-60473-293-1
- Bailey, Randall C., ed. (2003). Yet With a Steady Beat: Contemporary U.S. Afrocentric Biblical Interpretation. Society of Biblical Literature.
- Berlinerblau, Jacques (1999). Heresy in the University: The Black Athena Controversy and the Responsibilities of American Intellectuals. Rutgers University Press.
- Binder, Amy J. (2002). Contentious curricula: Afrocentrism and creationism in American public schools. Princeton University Press.
- Browder, Anthony T. (1992). Nile Valley Contributions To Civilization: Exploding the Myths, Volume 1. Washington, DC: Institute of Karmic Guidance.
- Henderson, Errol Anthony (1995). Afrocentrism and World Politics: towards a new paradigm. Westport, Connecticut: Praeger.
- Henke, Holger; Reno, Fred, eds. (2003). Modern political culture in the Caribbean. University of the West Indies Press.
- Howe, Stephen (1998). Afrocentrism: mythical pasts and imagined homes. London: Verso. ISBN 9781859848739.
- Konstan, David. "Inventing Ancient Greece: [Review article]", History and Theory, Vol. 36, No. 2. (May 1997), pp. 261–269.
- Lefkowitz, Mary (1996). History Lesson: A Race Odyssey. Yale University Press. ISBN 0-300-12659-X.
- Lefkowitz, Mary (1996). Not Out of Africa: How Afrocentrism Became an Excuse to Teach Myth as History. New York: Basic Books. ISBN 0-465-09837-1.
- Lefkowitz, Mary R.; Guy MacLean Rogers, eds. (1996). Black Athena Revisited. University of North Carolina Press. ISBN 0-8078-4555-8.
- Moses, Wilson Jeremiah (1998). Afrotopia: the roots of African American popular history. Cambridge University Press.
- Sniderman, Paul M.; Piazza, Thomas (2002). Black Pride and Black Prejudice. Princeton University Press.
- Walker, Clarence E. (2000). We Can't Go Home Again: An Argument about Afrocentrism. Oxford University Press. ISBN 0-19-509571-5.
