= Culture of North Africa =

Map of North Africa

The culture of North Africa encompasses the customs and traditions of art, architecture, music, literature, lifestyle, philosophy, food, politics and religion that have been practiced and maintained by the numerous ethnic groups of North Africa. North Africa encompasses the northern portion of Africa, including a large portion of the Sahara Desert. The region's commonly defined boundaries include Algeria, Egypt, Libya, Morocco, Tunisia, and Western Sahara, stretching from the Atlantic shores of the Western Sahara in the west, to Egypt's Red Sea coast in the east. The United Nations' definition additionally includes Sudan in the region. The inhabitants of North Africa are roughly divided in a manner corresponding to the principal geographic regions of North Africa: the Maghreb, the Nile valley, and the Sahel.

The countries of North Africa all have Modern Standard Arabic as their official language, and almost all their inhabitants follow Islam. The most spoken dialects are Maghrebi Arabic, a form of Classical Arabic dating back from the 8th century AD, and Egyptian Arabic. The largest and most numerous ethnic group in North Africa are the Arabs. In Algeria and Morocco, Berbers are the second largest ethnic group after the Arab majority. Arabs constitute 70% to 80% of the population of Algeria, 92%to 97% of Libya, 67% to 70% of Morocco and 98% of Tunisia's population. The Berbers comprise 20% of Algeria, 10% of Libya, 35% of Morocco and 1% of Tunisia's population.

The region is predominantly Muslim with a Jewish minority in Morocco and Tunisia, and significant Christian minority—the Copts—in Egypt, Algeria, Morocco, Libya, and Tunisia. In 2001, the number of Christians in North Africa was estimated at 9 million, the majority of whom live in Egypt, with the remainder live in Maghreb countries. North Africa formerly had a large Jewish population, almost all of whom emigrated to France or Israel when the North African nations gained independence. Prior to the modern establishment of Israel, there were about 600,000-700,000 Jews in Northern Africa, including both Sephardi Jews (refugees from France, Spain and Portugal from the Renaissance era) as well as indigenous Mizrahi Jews. Today, fewer than fifteen thousand remain in the region—almost all in Morocco and Tunisia—and are mostly part of a French speaking urban elite. (See Jewish exodus from Arab lands.)

North Africans share a large amount of their genetic, ethnic, cultural and linguistic identity and influence with the Middle East, a process that began with the Neolithic Revolution c. 10,000 BC and pre Dynastic Egypt. The countries of North Africa are also a major part of the Arab world. The Islamic influence in North Africa is significant, with the region being major part of the Muslim world. North Africa is associated with the Middle East in the realm of geopolitics to form the Middle East-North Africa (MENA) region.

== Algeria ==
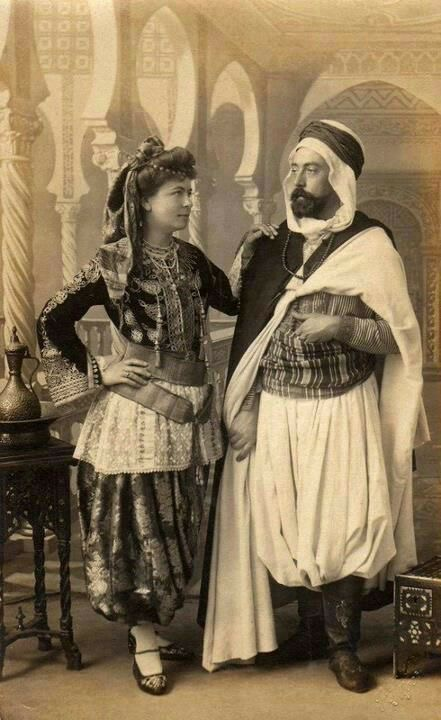
Algerian traditional clothing

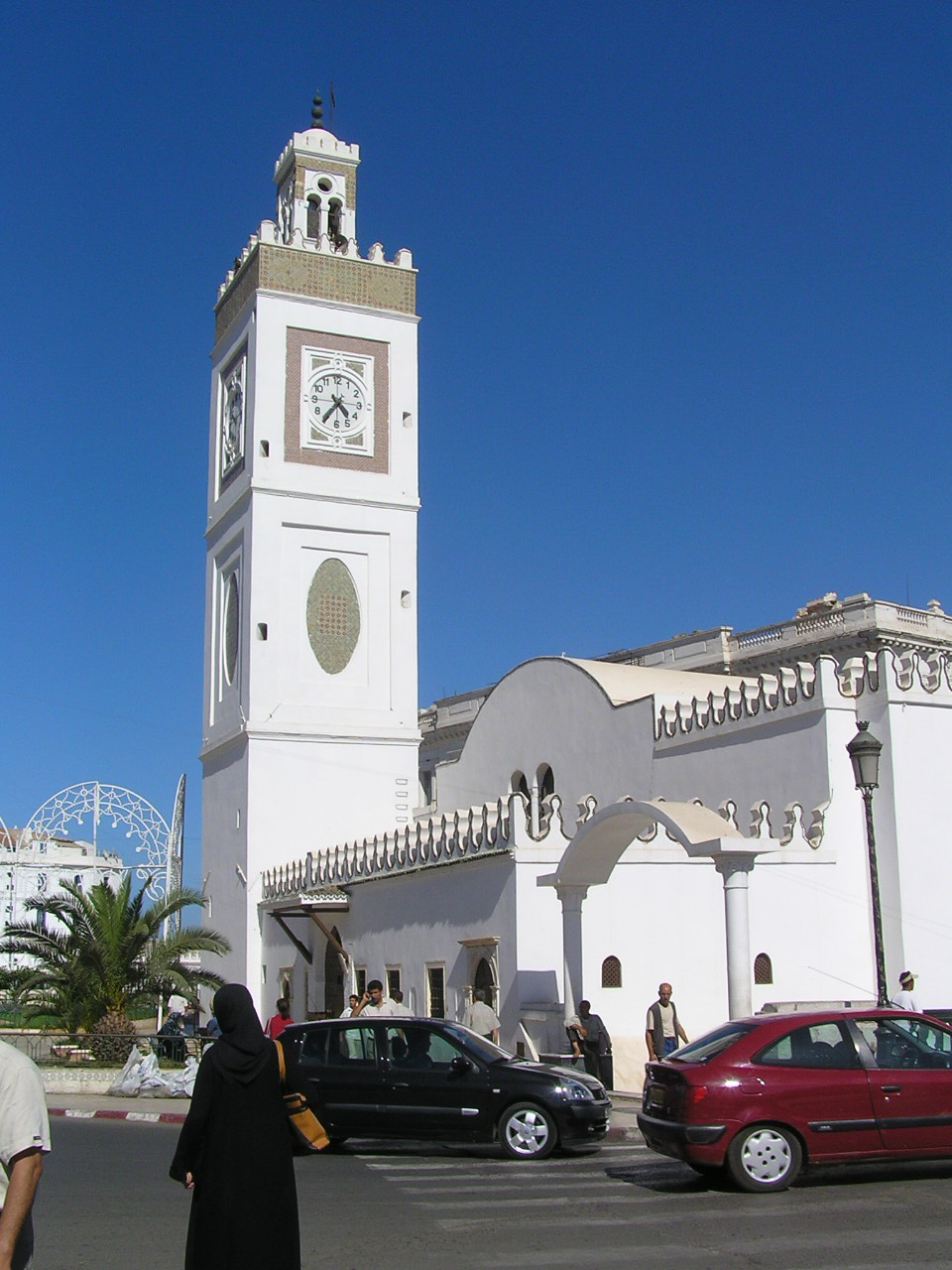
Mosque in Algiers

Modern Algerian literature has been strongly influenced by the country's recent history. Famous novelists of the 20th century include Mohammed Dib, Albert Camus, and Kateb Yacine, while Assia Djebar is widely translated. Important novelists of the 1980s included Rachid Mimouni, later vice-president of Amnesty International, and Tahar Djaout, murdered by an Islamist group in 1993 for his secularist views. As early as Roman times, Apuleius, in M'Daourouch, was native to what would become Algeria.

In philosophy and the humanities, Malek Bennabi and Frantz Fanon are noted for their thoughts on decolonization, while Augustine of Hippo was born in Tagaste (about 60 miles from the present day city of Annaba), and Ibn Khaldun, though born in Tunis, wrote the Muqaddima while staying in Algeria.

Algerian culture has been strongly influenced by Islam, the main religion. The works of the Sanusi family in pre-colonial times, and of Emir Abdelkader and Sheikh Ben Badis in colonial times, are widely noted.

The Algerian musical genre best known abroad is raï, a pop-flavored, opinionated take on folk music, featuring international stars such as Khaled and Cheb Mami. However, in Algeria itself the older, highly verbal chaabi style remains more popular, with such stars as El Hadj El Anka or Dahmane El Harrachi. The tradition of raï emerged in the city of Oran by the end of the 20th century as a combination of popular music and traditional Bedouin desert music. For more classical tastes, Andalusi music, brought from Al-Andalus by Morisco refugees, is preserved in many older coastal towns.

The traditional clothing worn and preserved by Algerians varies among different regions and communities within Algeria. Traditional Algerian clothing is influenced by Islamic custom, although there are Algerians who have adopted clothing based on Western styles, especially in the cities. In urban areas, there is a mix of traditional clothing and increasingly common Western style clothing, whereas traditional clothing is much more common in rural areas. As an Islamic country, Algeria has a dress code. Most Algerians follow Islamic dress codes, and foreigners are expected to show modesty, such as female visitors avoiding exposing their shoulders, knees, or chest.

== Egypt ==
Egyptian culture has six thousand years of recorded history. Ancient Egypt was among the earliest civilizations. For millennia, Egypt maintained a strikingly complex and stable culture that influenced later cultures of Europe, the Middle East and Africa. After the Pharaonic era, Egypt came under the influence of Hellenism, for a time Christianity, and later, Arab and Islamic culture. Today, many aspects of Egypt's ancient culture exist in interaction with newer elements, including the influence of modern Western culture, itself with roots in Ancient Egypt. Egypt's capital city, Cairo, is Africa's largest city and has been renowned for centuries as a center of learning, culture and commerce.

Egypt has had a thriving media and arts industry since the late 19th century, and today has more than 30 satellite channels and over 100 films produced each year. Cairo has long been known as the "Hollywood of the East." To bolster its media industry further, especially with the keen competition from the Persian Gulf Arab States and Lebanon, a large media city was built. Egypt is also the only Arabic-speaking country with an opera house.

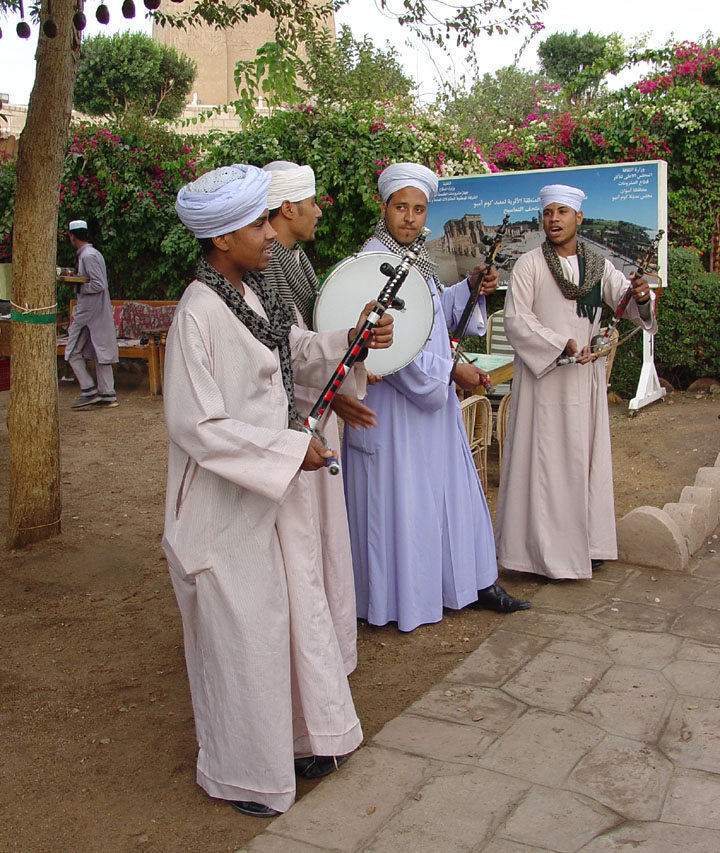
Egyptian folk musicians

Some famous Egyptians include:

- Saad Zaghlul (leader of first modern Egyptian revolution; founder of Wafd political party)
- Gamal Abdel Nasser (former president and mastermind of the present republic)
- Anwar Sadat (former president; winner of the Nobel Peace Prize)
- Boutros Boutros-Ghali (former Secretary General of the United Nations)
- Naguib Mahfouz (Nobel Prize-winning novelist)
- Umm Kulthum (singer)
- Omar Sharif (actor)
- Ahmed Zewail (Nobel Prize-winning chemist)
- Mohamed ElBaradei (Head of the International Atomic Energy Agency; 2005 Nobel Peace Prize Winner)

For more famous Egyptians, see List of Egyptians and Egyptians

== Libya ==
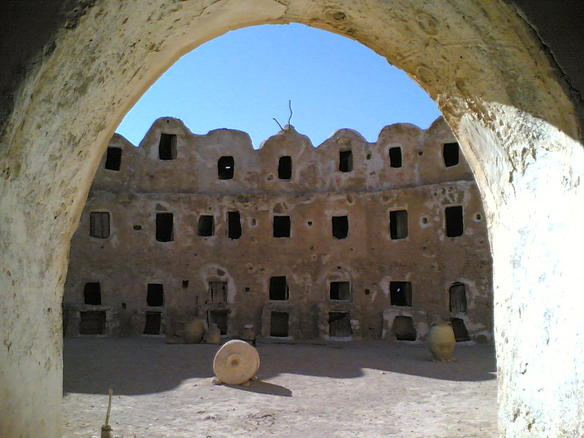
Qasr El Haj, 150 kilometres (93 mi) south of Tripoli

Libyan culture is, to a certain extent, similar to that of its other Arab neighbour states and the Libyan people very much consider themselves as part of a wider Arab community. The primary language is a colloquial form of Arabic that is unique to the area around Libya. There seem to be two distinct dialects and a couple of village and tribal dialects. Libyan Arabs have a heritage in the traditions of the nomadic Bedouin and associate themselves with a particular Bedouin tribe.

Most Libyans live in apartment blocks or various kinds of independent housing units, depending on their income status. Most of the Arabs who have lived a nomadic lifestyle, traditionally in tents, have been settled into various towns and cities in Libya. Statistics on the population maintaining a nomadic lifestyle are unclear. Most of the population are engaged in occupations in industry and services and a small percentage in agriculture.

Similar to some other countries in the Arab world, Libya boasts few theatres or art galleries. Public entertainment is almost non-existent even in the big cities. Most Libyans instead enjoy regular trips to the country's many beaches. They also visit Libya's many preserved archeological sites, especially that of Leptis Magna, which is widely considered to be one of the best preserved Roman archeological sites in the world.

The nation's capital, Tripoli, has a number of museums and archives, including the National Archives, the Government Library, the Ethnographic Museum, the Archaeological Museum, the Epigraphy Museum and the Islamic Museum. The Jamahirirya museum, built in consultation with UNESCO, is possibly the country's most famous and houses one of the finest collections of classical art in the Mediterranean.

There has recently been something of a revival of the arts in Libya, especially in the field of painting and private galleries are springing up to provide a showcase for new talent. Conversely, for many years there have been no public theatres and only a few cinemas showing foreign films. The tradition of folk culture is still alive and well, with troupes performing music and dance at frequent festivals, both in Libya and abroad. Libyan television primarily broadcasts various styles of traditional Libyan music. Traditional Tuareg music and dance are popular in Ghadames and the south.

== Morocco ==
Morocco is predominantly composed of Arabs who comprise 67% of the population, while Berbers make up 31% and Sahrawis make up 2%. While the two official languages of Morocco are Standard Arabic and Standard Moroccan Berber, according to the 2014 general census, 92% of Moroccans speak Moroccan Arabic (Darija) as a native language. About 26% of the population speaks a Berber language, in its Tarifit, Tamazight, or Tashelhit varieties.

== Sudan ==
- Music of Sudan
- List of writers from Sudan
- Islam in Sudan

Sudan's largest Christian denominations are the Roman Catholic Church, the Episcopal Church of the Sudan, the Presbyterian Church in the Sudan and the Coptic Orthodox Church.

== Tunisia ==
See also:

- Islam in Tunisia
- Music of Tunisia
- Tunisian Arabic

== Western Sahara ==
The major ethnic group in the Western Sahara is the Sahrawis, a nomadic or bedouin tribal or ethnic group, speaking the Ḥassānīya dialect of Arabic, which is also the majority dialect in Mauritania. They are of mixed Arab-Berber descent, but claim descent from the Beni Hassan, a Yemeni tribe supposed to have migrated across the desert in the 11th century.

Generally indistinguishable from the Hassaniya speaking tribes of neighboring Mauritania, Morocco and Algeria, Western Saharan Sahrawi people differ from their neighbors largely due to their exposure to Spanish colonial domination. All the surrounding territories were during the late 19th and early 20th century period of European colonial rule were generally under French colonial rule.

Like other neighboring Saharan bedouin and Hassaniya groups, the Sahrawis are Muslims of the Sunni sect and the Maliki law school. Local religious custom 'urf is, like other Saharan groups, heavily influenced by pre-Islamic Berber and African practises, and differs substantially from urban practises. For example, Sahrawi Islam has traditionally functioned without mosques in the normal sense of the word, in an adaptation to nomadic life.

The originally clan- and tribe-based society underwent a massive social change in the process of the imposition of colonial rule and subsequent upheaval in 1975, when a part of the population was fled into exile rather than pass under Moroccan rule, and settled in the refugee camps of Tindouf, Algeria, splitting up families, clans and tribes over allegiance or opposition to the imposition of Moroccan rule. For developments among this population, see Sahrawi and Tindouf Province.

Subsequent to taking effective control of the territory, the Moroccan government considerably invested in the social and economic development of the Western Sahara under its control, with special emphasis on education, modernisation and infrastructure as part of efforts to win over the population. El-Aaiun in particular has been the target of heavy government investment, and has grown rapidly. Several thousands Sahrawis study in Moroccan universities. Literacy rates are estimated at some 50% of the population. Polisario claims the refugee population in Tindouf has a literacy rate in the 90's, which would be above the verified literacy rate in the host country Algeria, recorded at roughly 86%.

To date, there have been few thorough studies of the culture due in part to the political situation. Some language and culture studies, mainly by French researchers, have been performed on Sahrawi communities in northern Mauritania.

== See also ==
- List of Roman Latin poets and writers from North Africa
