= List of Roman Latin poets and writers from North Africa =

This is a list of Roman Latin poets and writers from North Africa.

== Poets ==
- Corippus
- Claudian
- Terence
- Luxorius
- Dracontius

== Writers ==
- Augustine of Hippo
- Cassius Dionysius
- Saint Cyprian
- Septimius Severus
- Ptolemy
- Apuleius
