= Ivan Van Sertima =

British Africanist (1935–2009)

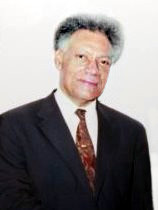
- Van Sertima in 1995
- Born: 26 January 1935; Kitty Village, British Guiana
- Died: 25 May 2009 (aged 74); Highland Park, New Jersey, United States
- Citizenship: United Kingdom
- Education: SOAS University of London; Rutgers University
- Known for: Theory of pre-Columbian contact between Africa and the Americas
- Spouses: Maria Nagy (m. 1964; divorced); Jacqueline L. Patten (m. 1984)
- Scientific career
- Fields: Africana Studies
- Workplaces: Rutgers University

Ivan Gladstone Van Sertima (26 January 1935 – 25 May 2009) was a Guyanese-born British associate professor of Africana Studies at Rutgers University in the United States.

He was best known for his Olmec alternative origin speculations, a brand of pre-Columbian contact theory, which he proposed in his book They Came Before Columbus (1976). While his Olmec theory has "spread widely in African American community, both lay and scholarly", it was mostly ignored in Mesoamericanist scholarship, and has been called Afrocentric pseudoarchaeology and pseudohistory to the effect of "robbing native American cultures". (Note: "either completely ignored or generally dismissed by anthropologists, historians and other academic professionals." Haslip-Vierra, de Montellano and Barbour.)

== Early life ==
Van Sertima was born in Kitty Village, near Georgetown, in what was then the colony of British Guiana (present-day Guyana); he retained his British citizenship throughout his life. He completed primary and secondary school in Guyana. He attended the School of Oriental and African Studies (SOAS) at the University of London from 1959. Van Sertima completed his undergraduate studies in African languages and literature at SOAS in 1969, where he graduated with honours.

From 1957 to 1959, Van Sertima worked as a Press and Broadcasting Officer in the Guyana Information Services. During the 1960s, he worked for several years in Great Britain as a journalist, doing weekly broadcasts to the Caribbean and Africa. Van Sertima married Maria Nagy in 1964; they adopted two sons, Larry and Michael.

In doing field work in Africa, he compiled a dictionary of Swahili legal terms in 1967. In 1970 Van Sertima immigrated to the United States, where he entered Rutgers University in New Brunswick, New Jersey, for graduate work.

After divorcing his first wife, Van Sertima remarried in 1984, to Jacqueline L. Patten, who had two daughters.

== Published work ==
He published his They Came Before Columbus in 1976, as a Rutgers graduate student. The book deals mostly with his arguments for an African origin of Mesoamerican culture in the Western Hemisphere. Published by Random House rather than an academic press, They Came Before Columbus was a best-seller and achieved widespread attention within the African-American community for his claims of prehistoric African contact and diffusion of culture in Central and South America. It was generally "ignored or dismissed" by academic experts at the time and strongly criticised in detail in an academic journal, Current Anthropology, in 1997.

Van Sertima completed his master's degree at Rutgers in 1977. He became associate professor of African Studies at Rutgers in the Department of Africana Studies in 1979. Also in 1979, Van Sertima founded the Journal of African Civilizations, which he exclusively edited and published for decades.

He published several annual compilations, volumes of the journal dealing with various topics of African history. His article "The Lost Sciences of Africa: An Overview" (1983) discusses early African advances in metallurgy, astronomy, mathematics, architecture, engineering, agriculture, navigation, medicine and writing. He posited that higher learning, in Africa as elsewhere, was the preserve of elites in the centres of civilisations, rendering them vulnerable in the event of the destruction of those centres and the loss of such knowledge. Van Sertima also discussed African scientific contributions in an essay for the volume African Renaissance, published in 1999 (he had first published the essay in 1983). This was a record of the conference held in Johannesburg, South Africa, in September 1998 on the theme of the African Renaissance.

On 7 July 1987, Van Sertima testified before a United States Congressional committee to oppose recognition of the 500th anniversary of Christopher Columbus's "discovery" of the Americas. He said, "You cannot really conceive of how insulting it is to Native Americans ... to be told they were 'discovered'."

=== They Came Before Columbus: The African Presence in Ancient America (1976) ===
In this book, Ivan Van Sertima explores his theory that Africans made landfall and had significant influence on the native peoples of Mesoamerica, primarily the Olmec civilization. His work has been rejected as pseudoscience or pseudoarchaeology. This work was published by Random House and did not go through a peer review process.

Van Sertima reached larger audiences through chapters narrated by figures of the past, including Christopher Columbus and the Mali king Abu Bakr II. In doing this, primary source anecdotes are often the evidence cited by Van Sertima combined with inference and exaggeration, though he implies to his readers that the narrative is based in fact. In Chapter 5, called "Among the Quetzalcoatls", Van Sertima narrates the arrival of Abu Bakr II to an Aztec civilization in Mexico in 1311, describing the Mali king as "a true child of the sun burned dark by its rays" in direct and explicit comparison to the Aztec "sun god" Quetzalcoatl, as Van Sertima writes. This interaction is not rooted in historical evidence and Van Sertima does not offer a cited source to back up his narrative. This is one of many examples of Van Sertima's theories that Mesoamerican mythologies are based on Pre-Columbian African contact theories.

Between narrative chapters, Van Sertima develops his main claims about African contact with the Americas in an essay style and includes images of artifacts, which primarily consist of photographs of ceramic heads that Van Sertima says have African features. Van Sertima also includes photos of an African man and woman for comparison, but he does not include pictures of inhabitants of the area where the artifacts were found. Van Sertima focuses specifically on the Olmec colossal heads, saying that the characteristics of the stone faces are "indisputably" African, while Mesoamerican experts such as Richard Diehl disregards this claim, as the statues are stylized and generally accepted as representing native Mesoamericans.

Van Sertima argues that African contact likely happened more than once. In Chapter Four, "Africans Across the Sea", Van Sertima explores numerous ways that he claims Africans could have travelled by boat to South and Central America. Van Sertima writes about shipping technology, saying that even the most ancient of Egyptian ships were sturdy enough to cross the Atlantic on the currents that run from northwest Africa to the Americas.

A chapter is also devoted to the presence of bottle gourds originally from Africa found in ancient Mesoamerican graves. Experts have determined that the gourds floated across the Atlantic and washed ashore in the Americas to be adopted by Mesoamerican cultures. He later discusses carved pipes found in Mesoamerican archaeological sites, suggesting that the use of pipes for smoking must have been an inherited practice from African or Asian visitors.

Van Sertima does devote a considerable portion of the book to interaction of cultures within Africa as well, with Chapter 7 and 8, titled "Black Africa and Egypt" and "The Black Kings of the 25th Dynasty” in which he explores the West and Southern African man's influence on the ancient Egyptian civilization. He devotes Chapter 8 to discussing the beneficial innovations and flourishing of culture under Nubian rulers in Egypt. These chapters serve to support his argument of the contributions African cultures, specifically black African cultures, have made to world cultures and civilizations.

Van Sertima states near the end of the book that all civilizations are capable of independent invention, and that he aims to place his claims on the spectrum between diffusionism and isolationism, or the idea that cultures separated geographically are capable of inventing similar things without interaction between the two. However, some of the biggest resting points of his theory attribute Mesoamerican pyramids, mummification, symbolism, mythology, calendar technology, and much of the art to African influence and guidance. Critics in anthropology and archaeology have stated that They Came Before Columbus portrays Native Mesoamerican peoples as inferior and incapable of developing highly sophisticated civilizations, cultures, and technologies without the influence of Africans arriving by boat as "gods" in their eyes, as Van Sertima puts it. The claims in this book are not generally accepted in the scientific fields of archaeology and anthropology.

== Reception ==
Van Sertima's work on Olmec civilization has been criticised by Mesoamerican academics, who describe his claims to be ill-founded and false. Van Sertima's Journal of African Civilizations was not considered for inclusion in Journals of the Century. In 1997 academics in an article in the journal Current Anthropology criticised in detail many elements of They Came Before Columbus (1976). Except for a brief mention, the book had not previously been reviewed in an academic journal. The researchers wrote a systematic rebuttal of Van Sertima's claims, stating that Van Sertima's "proposal was without foundation" in claiming African diffusion as responsible for prehistoric Olmec culture (in present-day Mexico). They noted that no "genuine African artifact had been found in a controlled archaeological excavation in the New World." They noted that Olmec stone heads were carved hundreds of years prior to the claimed contact and only superficially appear to be African; the Nubians whom Van Sertima had claimed as their originators do not resemble these "portraits". They further noted that in the 1980s, Van Sertima had changed his timeline of African influence, suggesting that Africans made their way to the New World in the 10th century B.C., to account for more recent independent scholarship in the dating of Olmec culture.

They further called "fallacious" his claims that Africans had diffused the practices of pyramid building and mummification, and noted the independent rise of these in the Americas. Additionally, they wrote that Van Sertima "diminishe[d] the real achievements of Native American culture" by his claims of African origin for them.

Van Sertima wrote a response to be included in the article (as is standard academic practice) but withdrew it. The journal required that reprints must include the entire article and would have had to include the original authors' response (written but not published) to his response. Instead, Van Sertima replied to his critics in "his" journal volume published as Early America Revisited (1998).

In a New York Times 1977 review of Van Sertima's 1976 book They Came Before Columbus, the archaeologist Glyn Daniel labelled Van Sertima's work as "ignorant rubbish", and concluded that the works of Van Sertima, and Barry Fell, whom he was also reviewing, "give us badly argued theories based on fantasies".

In 1981 Dean R. Snow, a professor of anthropology, wrote that Van Sertima "uses the now familiar technique of stringing together bits of carefully selected evidence, each surgically removed from the context that would give it a rational explanation". Snow continued, "The findings of professional archaeologists and physical anthropologists are misrepresented so that they seem to support the [Van Sertima] hypothesis".

In 1981, They Came Before Columbus received the "Clarence L. Holte Literary Prize". Sertima was inducted into the "Rutgers African-American Alumni Hall of Fame" in 2004.

== Death and legacy ==
Van Sertima retired in 2006. He died on 25 May 2009 aged 74. His widow, Jacqueline Van Sertima, said she would continue to publish the Journal of African Civilizations and that she planned to publish a book of his poetry.

== Bibliography ==
As author

- 1968, Caribbean Writers: Critical Essays, London & Port of Spain: New Beacon Books
- 1976, They Came Before Columbus, New York: Random House
- 1999, "The Lost Science of Africa: An Overview", in Malegapuru William Makgoba (ed.), African Renaissance, Sandton and Cape Town, South Africa: Mafube and Tafelberg

As editor

- 1979–2005, The Journal of African Civilizations (anthologies published by Transaction Publishers of New Brunswick, New Jersey)
- 1983, Blacks in Science: Ancient and Modern
- 1985, African Presence in Early Europe
- 1986, Great African Thinkers, Cheikh Anta Diop
- 1988, Great Black Leaders: Ancient and Modern
- 1988, Black Women in Antiquity
- 1988, Cheikh Anta Diop, New Brunswick, NJ: The Journal of African Civilizations, New Brunswick, New Jersey: Transaction Publishers, 1988
- 1988,Van Sertima before Congress: The Columbus Myth, transcript of a speech of 7 July 1987 before the US Congress Christopher Columbus Quincentenary Jubilee Commission (Committee on Post Office and Civil Service; Subcommittee on Census and Population)
- 1992, The Golden Age of the Moor
- 1992, Africa Presence in Early America, New Brunswick: Transaction Publishers
- 1993, Egypt Revisited
- 1998, Early America Revisited

As co-editor

- with Runoko Rashidi, African Presence in Early Asia, New Brunswick, NJ: The Journal of African Civilizations, 1985 (reprint 1995)

== See also ==
- James R. A. Bailey
- Pre-Columbian trans-oceanic contact
- Runoko Rashidi
- Joel Augustus Rogers
