= Dynastic race theory =

Theory of the origins of Dynastic Egypt

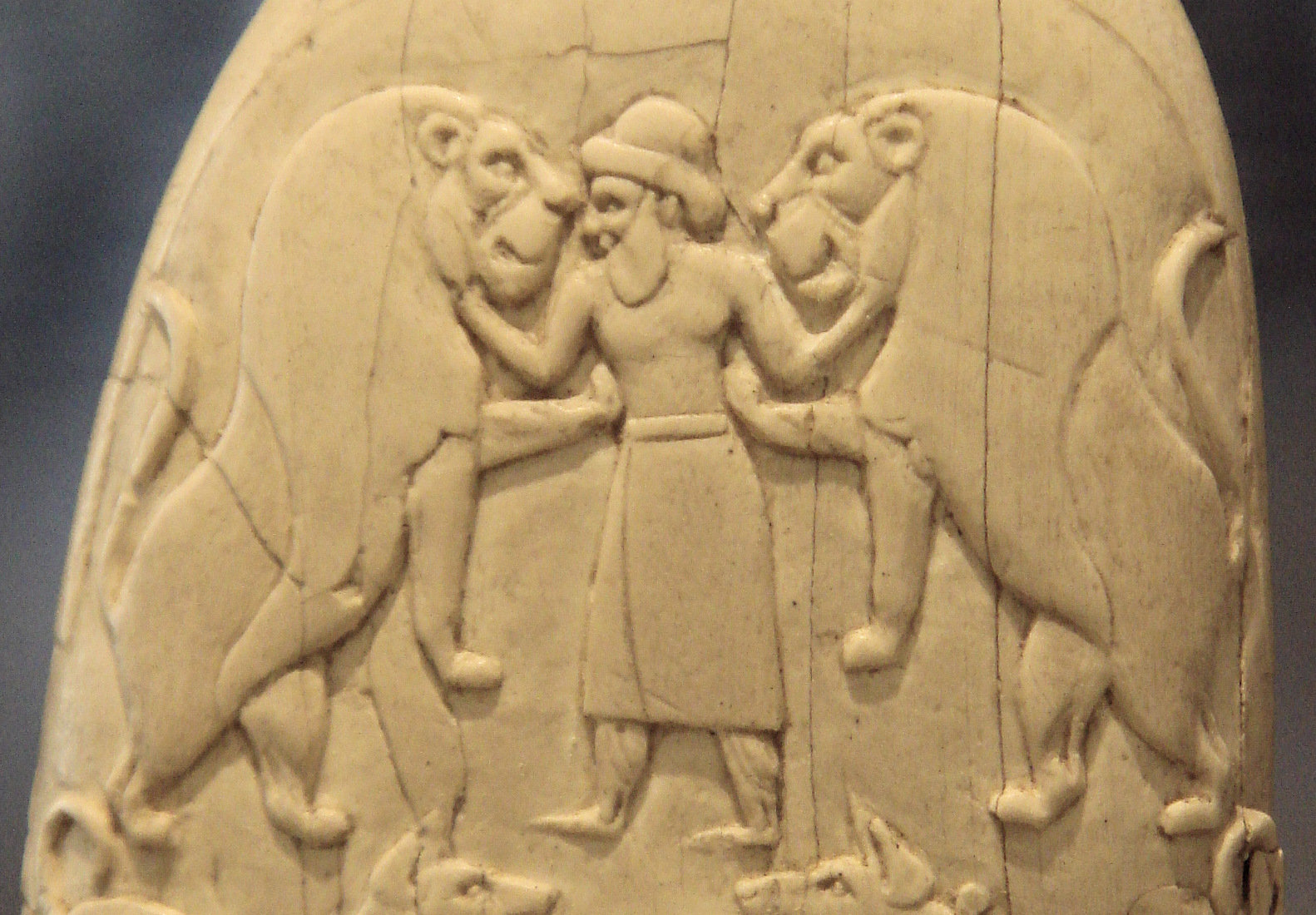
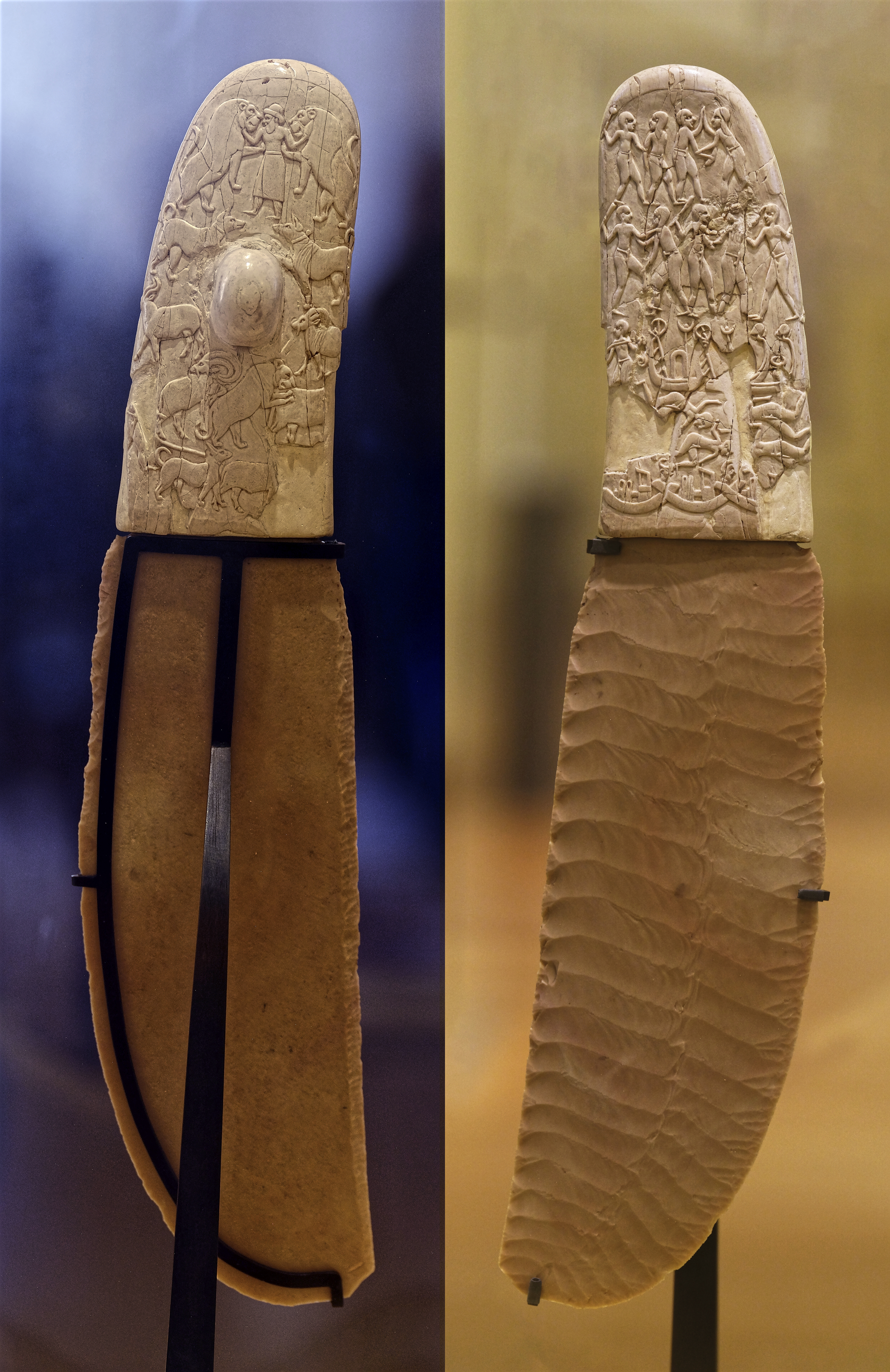
Purported Mesopotamian ruler on the Egyptian Gebel el-Arak Knife. Naqada II period of Egyptian prehistory (3500—3200 BCE), Abydos, Egypt. Rather than showing a local ruler, this figure may have been derived from an imported Mesopotamian cylinder seal.

The dynastic race theory was the earliest thesis to attempt to explain how predynastic Egypt developed into the sophisticated monarchy of Dynastic Egypt. The theory holds that the earliest roots of the ancient Egyptian dynastic civilisation were imported by invaders from Mesopotamia who then founded the First Dynasty and brought culture to the indigenous population. This theory had strong supporters in the Egyptological community in the first half of the 20th century, but has since lost mainstream support.

== Origins ==
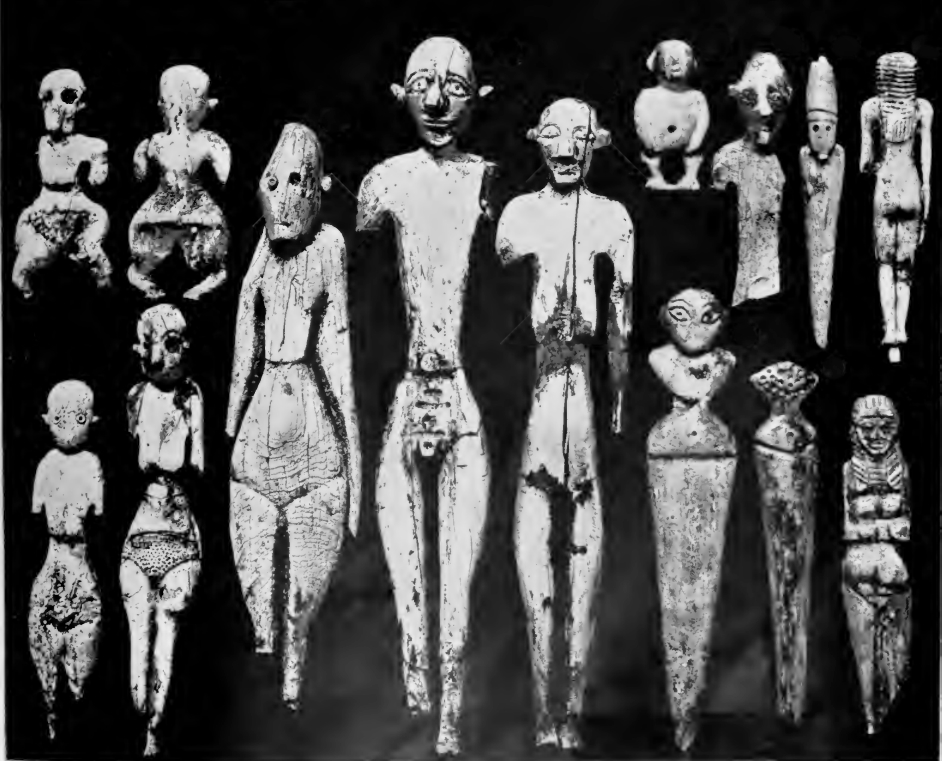
Naqada I statuettes (c. 4000—3600 BCE)

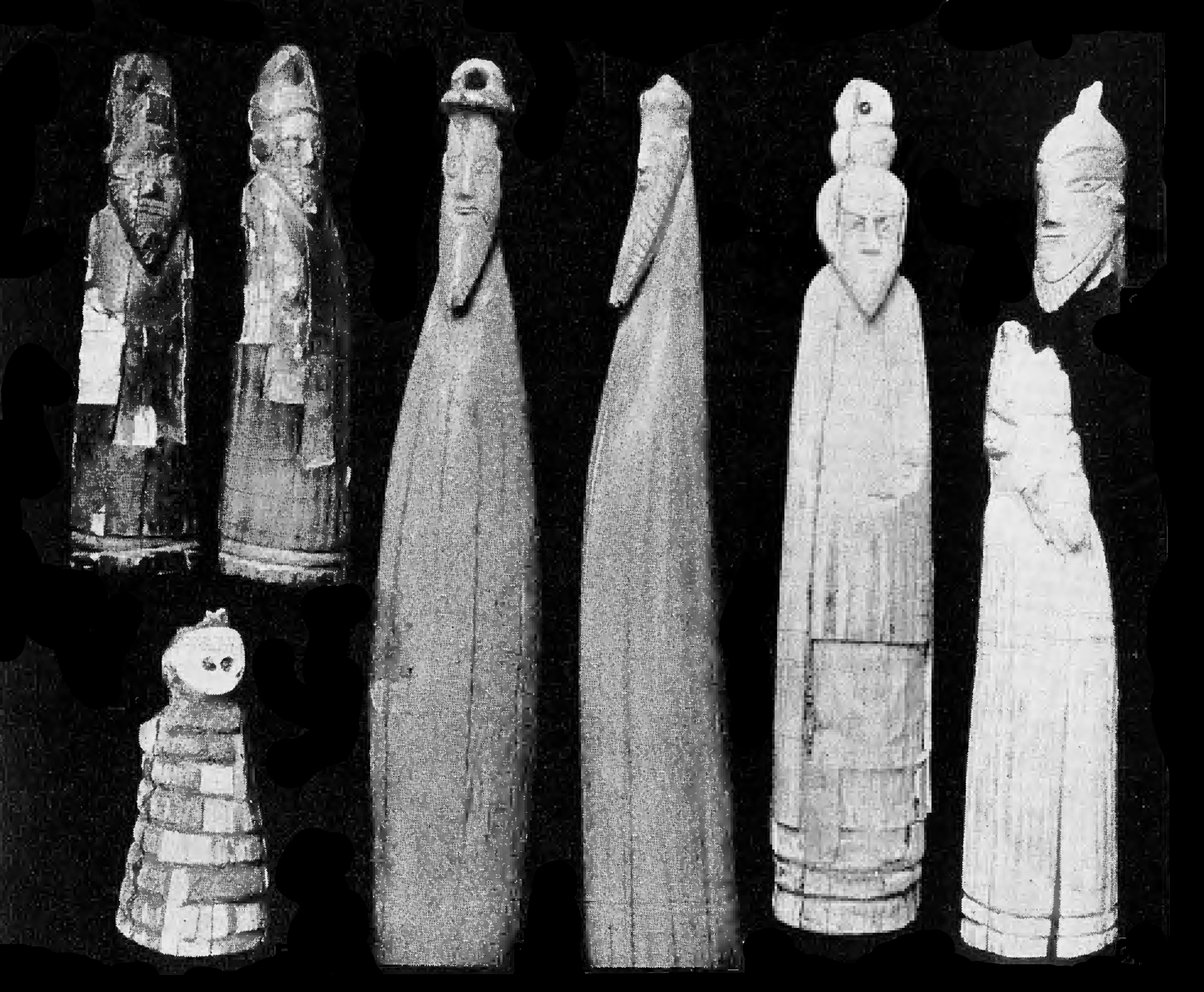
Naqada II statuettes (c. 3650—3300 BCE)

In the early 20th century, Egyptologist Sir William Matthew Flinders Petrie deduced that skeletal remains found at pre-dynastic sites at Naqada (Upper Egypt) indicated the presence of two different races, with the Dynastic Race, also referred to as the "Followers of Horus", differentiated physically by a noticeably larger skeletal structure and cranial capacity. Petrie concluded that the physical differences of the remains in conjunction with the previously unknown burial styles, uncharacteristic tomb architecture, and abundance of foreign artifacts, implied this race must have been an invading ruling elite that was responsible for the seemingly sudden rise of Egyptian civilization. Based on plentiful cultural evidence, Petrie determined that the invader race had come from Mesopotamia, and imposed themselves on the native Badarian culture to become their rulers. Petrie adduced new architectural styles—the distinctly Mesopotamian "niched-facade" architecture—pottery styles, cylinder seals and a few artworks, as well as numerous Predynastic rock and tomb paintings depicting Mesopotamian style boats, symbols, and figures.

"The Dynastic People. (...) The distinctive character of the 1st dynasty, which separates it from all that went before, is the conquest and union of the whole land of Egypt. (...) This falcon tribe had certainly originated in Elam, as indicated by the hero and lions on the ’Araq knife handle. They went down the Persian Gulf and settled in the “ horn of Africa.” There they named the “Land of Punt,” sacred to later Egyptians as the source of the race. (...) Those who went up the Red Sea formed the dynastic invaders of Egypt, entering by the Qoceir-Koptos road."

— William Matthew Flinders Petrie, The making of Egypt (1939).

This came to be called the "dynastic race theory". The theory further argued that the Mesopotamians then conquered both Upper and Lower Egypt and founded the First Dynasty. Predynastic and First Dynasty burial sites similar to Naqada were also found at Abydos, Sakkara, and Hieraconpolis.

Versions of the Dynastic race model were adopted by scholars as L. A. Waddell, and Walter Bryan Emery, a former Chair of Egyptology at University College London.

== Decline ==
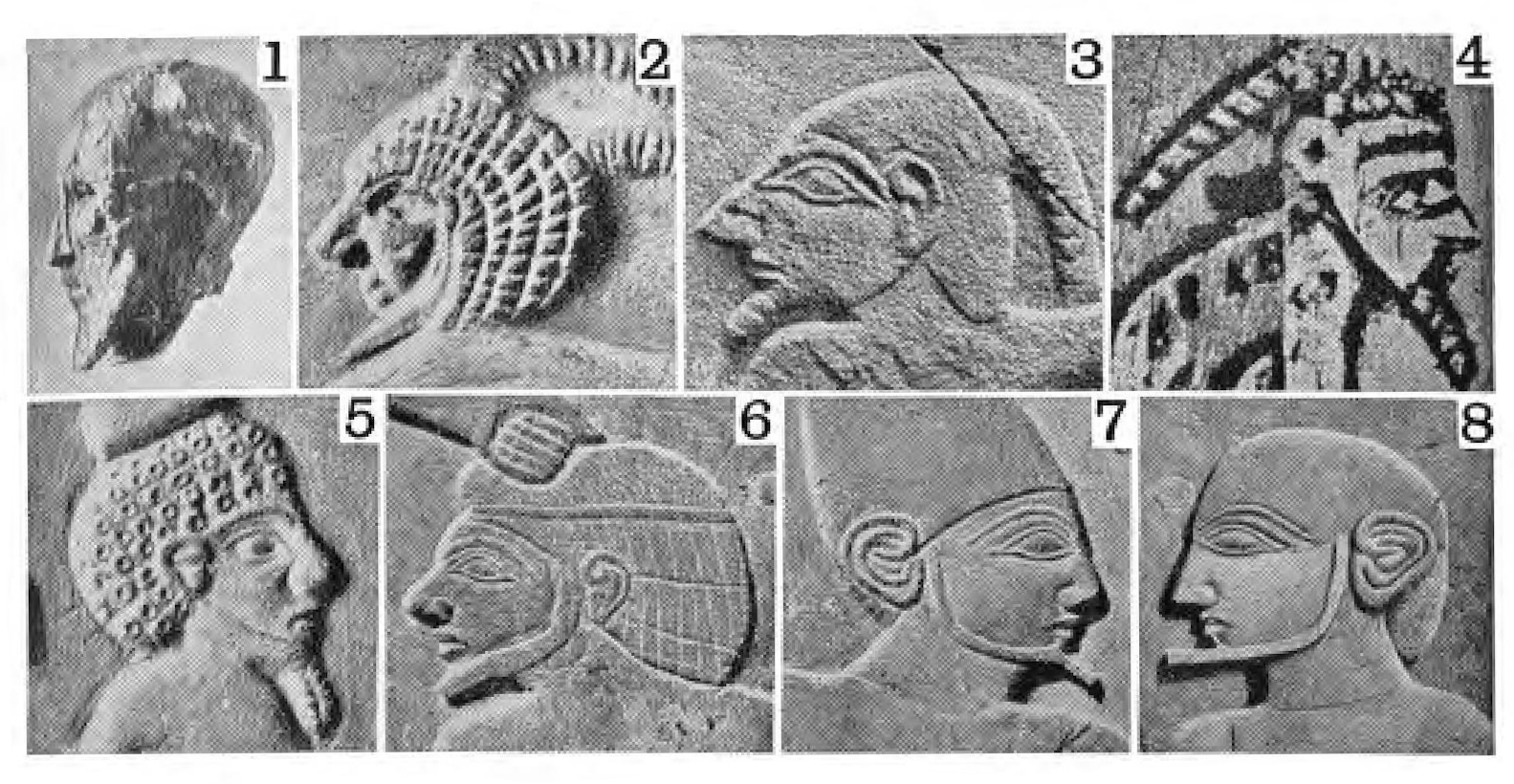
Physical types in Pre-Dynastic art, according to Petrie: 1)2) Prehistoric Egyptians 3)4) People from the east or north, with spotted robe and headdress 5) Curly-head people (conquered) 6) Chief of the Fayum Lake 7)8) Dynastic race.

The dynastic race theory is no longer an accepted thesis in the field of predynastic archaeology. While there is clear evidence the Naqada II culture borrowed abundantly from Mesopotamia, the most commonly held view today is that the achievements of the First Dynasty were the result of a long period of cultural and political development. Such borrowings are much older than the Naqada II period, the Naqada II period had a large degree of continuity with the Naqada I period, and the changes which did happen during the Naqada periods happened over significant amounts of time.

A version of the theory has been revived by some modern scholars, most notably David Rohl.

Modern Egyptology largely maintains the view that "state formation occurred as a mainly indigenous process", although significant differences in morphology indicated migration along the Nile Valley also took place. The Dynastic Race theory has been largely replaced by the theory Egypt was a hydraulic empire.

== In Afrocentrism ==
In the 1950s, when the Dynastic Race Theory was widely accepted by mainstream scholarship, the Senegalese scholar Cheikh Anta Diop was publicising his theory that the Ancient Egyptians were "Black Africans." Diop "paid special attention to the emergence of the Dynastic Race Theory", and claimed that European scholars supported this theory to avoid having to admit that the Ancient Egyptians were black and to characterise them as "Semitic" or "Caucasian". Other prominent Afrocentrists, including Martin Bernal, later also argued against the dynastic race theory in favour of a "Black Egyptian" model. Afrocentrists particularly condemn the alleged dividing of African peoples into racial clusters as being new versions of the Dynastic Race Theory and the Hamitic hypothesis.

== Modern genetic evidence ==
Advances in ancient DNA research have provided new data relevant to early twentieth-century hypotheses such as the dynastic race theory. Whereas the original theory relied primarily on typological interpretations of material culture, cranial morphology, and artistic representations, modern genetic studies allow direct investigation of population ancestry and mobility in ancient Egypt.

In 2025, the first whole-genome sequence of an individual from Egypt’s Old Kingdom was published. The individual, excavated at Nuwayrat in Middle Egypt and radiocarbon dated to between 2855 and 2570 BC, represents the earliest dynastic Egyptian genome analyzed to date.

Genomic analysis revealed that the individual’s ancestry was predominantly related to North African Neolithic populations, with a substantial minority component—approximately 20–24%—showing affinity with populations of the Eastern Fertile Crescent, including regions associated with Neolithic Mesopotamia. These results indicate that population interactions between Egypt and the Near East occurred prior to and during the formation of the Egyptian state.

Importantly, the genetic data do not support models proposing a wholesale population replacement or the arrival of a biologically distinct “dynastic race” responsible for the emergence of Egyptian civilization. Instead, the evidence is consistent with long-term population continuity in the Nile Valley combined with gradual gene flow and human mobility from neighboring regions. This pattern aligns with current archaeological interpretations that emphasize cultural exchange, regional interaction networks, and limited migration rather than large-scale invasion.

As additional ancient genomes from Egypt and surrounding regions are analyzed, genetic evidence is expected to further clarify the demographic processes underlying early Egyptian state formation and to provide a more nuanced understanding of population dynamics than those proposed by early diffusionist or invasionist theories.

== See also ==
- Ancient Egyptian race controversy
- New Chronology
