= Jean Terrasson =

French Catholic priest and author

Jean Terrasson (31 January 1670 – 15 September 1750), often referred to as the Abbé Terrasson, was a French Catholic priest, author and member of the Académie française. The erudite Antoine Terrasson was his nephew.

== Life ==
Jean Terrasson, born in Lyon, was elected a member of the Académie française in 1707. His 1715 Dissertation on Homer's Iliad took the side of the 'moderns' in the quarrel of the Ancients and the Moderns. In 1721 he became Professor of Greek at the College de France.

His best-known work is probably the fantasy novel Life of Sethos, Taken from Private Memoirs of the Ancient Egyptians (1731). This fiction elided Masonic and ancient Egyptian ritual, and served as an inspiration for Mozart and Schikaneder's Magic Flute.

== Works ==
- 1715: Dissertation critique sur l'Iliade de Homère.
  - 1716: Translated into English by Francis Brerewood as A critical dissertation upon Homer's Iliad.
  - 1716: Preface translated into English by Francis Brerewood as A discourse of ancient and modern learning, 1716
- 1720: Lettres sur le nouveau systême des finances.
- 1731: Sethos: histoire ou vie, tirée des monumens anecdotes de l'ancienne Egypte, traduite d'un manuscrit grec. Translated into English by Thomas Lediard as The life of Sethos: Taken from private memoirs of the ancient Egyptians
- 1754: La philosophie applicable à tous les objets de l'esprit et de la raison ouvrage en réflexions détachées.

== Commentary on Terrasson ==
Antoin E. Murphy writes in The Genesis of Macroeconomics (2008):

Given the fortune that Terrasson was making in the Mississippi Company, was it not natural to find him defending its operations in the pamphlets that he wrote. ...Furthermore, given Terrasson and Turgot's clerical connections—they were both abbés at this time...— ...Turgot was in no doubt about attributing them to Terrasson. Paul Harsin did not accept this... 'There is no doubt... with respect to Law's paternity of [the letters]'. The abbé Terrasson has also been credited with being the author of...Mémoire pour servir à justifier la Campagnie des Indes contre la censure de casuistes qui la condamnent (1720), which is also about Law's system. ...I agree with Harsin that Law either wrote or directed the writing of the letters. ...he may have used Terrasson as an intermediary for pushing his own ideas into the public arena.
