= Fekri Hassan =

Egyptian geoarchaeologist

Fekri Hassan is a geoarchaeologist. After studying geology and anthropology, Hassan commenced teaching at Washington State University department of Anthropology in 1974. From 1988 to 1990 he acted as advisor to the Ministry of Culture of Egypt. Currently professor emeritus, he had formerly held the chair of Petrie Professor of Archaeology (1994-2008) of the Institute of Archaeology and department of Egyptology of University College London. Program Director Master's of Cultural Heritage Management, French University of Egypt in partnership with the Paris-Sorbonne University. Editor of the African Archaeological Review journal, contributory editor of The Review of Archaeology he is also honorary president of the Egyptian Cultural Heritage Organisation.

== Selected works ==
- Hassan, Fekri A., ed. (2002). Droughts, food, and culture: ecological change and food security in Africa's later prehistory. New York: Kluwer. ISBN 978-0306467554.
- Butler, B. J.; Hassan, F.; Sparks, R. T.; Ucko, P. (2007). A future for the past: Petrie's Palestinian collection. London: Institute of Archaeology. ISBN 978-0-905853-42-0.
- Hassan, F. A.; Owens, L. S.; De Trafford, A.; Tassie, G. J.; Van Wetering, J., eds. (2009). Managing Egypt's Cultural Heritage (1st ed.). London: Golden House. ISBN 978-1906137144.
- Hassan, Fekri A.; Tassie, Geoffrey John; Owens, Lawrence Stewart; De Trafford, Aloisia; Van Wetering, Joris; El Daly, O., eds. (2015). The Management of Egypt's Cultural Heritage: Volume 2. London: Golden House Publications. ISBN 978-1906137403.
