= Clarence E. Walker =

American historian (1941–2024)

Clarence Earl Walker (1941-2024) was an American historian and Distinguished Professor in the Department of History at the University of California, Davis. He earned his bachelor's and master's degrees from San Francisco State University and a doctorate from the University of California, Berkeley.

Walker worked on Black American studies. In 2001, his book We Can't Go Home Again: An Argument About Afrocentrism was selected as an International Book of the Year by The Times Literary Supplement.

In 2015, he was awarded the US$45000 UC Davis Prize for Undergraduate Teaching and Scholarly Achievement. He planned to retire in June 2015.

His publications include:

- Mongrel Nation: The America Begotten by Thomas Jefferson and Sally Hemings, University of Virginia Press, 2009
- We Can't Go Home Again: An Argument About Afrocentrism, Oxford University Press, 2001
- Deromanticizing Black History: Critical Essays and Reappraisals, University of Tennessee Press, 1991

== Critique of Afrocentrism ==
Clarence E. Walker in 2001, referred to Afrocentrism as being “therapeutic mythology." He also noted: "In 1976, a group of French scientists working with the permission of the Egyptian government examined the mummy of Ramses II and concluded that the dead king was a 'leucoderm,' that is, a fair-skinned man, like prehistoric or ancient Mediterraneans, or, perhaps, the Berbers of Africa. The only Egyptian dynasty that could be called black without qualification, in the modern sense of the word, is the 25th Dynasty, 747-656 BCE."
