= Luxorius (poet) =

Ancient Roman poet and writer

Luxorius was an ancient Roman poet and writer of epigrams who lived in Carthage, Africa during the last years of the Vandal rule in the 6th century, under the reign of the Vandal Kings Thrasamund, Hilderic, and Gelimer (AD 496–534). He greatly admired the notable Roman author Martial, whom he used as a model when composing his works. Luxorius's writings served as a bridge between the end of the classical period and the beginning of medieval Latin.

"The son of Venus, who inflames everything with health-giving fire, provides water in place of his own torches through the medium of art."
Luxorius, A Latin Poet Among the Vandals

== Life ==
Little is known about the life of Luxorius. As with many poets and thinkers of his day, the only information available has been deduced from the analysis of primary texts, namely his epigrams in the Latin Anthology. While his birth and death dates are unknown, it is clear that Luxorius was alive and writing during the last years of the Vandal rule of Carthage, North Africa.

Luxorius' writings refer to pagan deities, but it is unclear to scholars whether he aligned himself with such beliefs. Rosenblum believes that he may have had valid reasoning for aligning himself more with the pagans than the Christians at the time: "The Vandals might have been more unlikely to persecute pagans than Catholics".

In A Latin Poet Among the Vandals, Rosenblum precedes the translated epigrams with a somewhat detailed account of Luxorius' life and times. He indicates that Luxorius was held in esteem by his contemporaries. In fact in a line from one of his poems Luxorius seems to refer to himself as vir clarus, a Latin expression denoting a title of honor. Rosenblum specifies, however, that it is most likely that Luxorius did not hold a public office; the title was more honorary than substantive.

== Works ==
Composed in Latin, Luxorius's ninety-one surviving poems are the largest single element included in the Latin Anthology, presumably compiled during his time. The corpus of his works has been translated into English by a few editors, most notably Morris Rosenblum in his 1961 edition. Luxorius's epigrams range from three-line poems to longer poems, extending for pages. The subjects of the epigrams are equally varied, ranging from titles such as "To a Noisy and Raging Dwarf" and "To a Fat and Unlucky Falconer" to the more serious "About a Stone Coffin in Which Foul Deeds Have Been Sculptured". His works, modeled after his mentor Martial, tell the reader about himself as well as the time in which he was alive. Luxorius was the first writer to publish a palindrome under his name, the third line of his epigram "De Romulo picto ubi in moris fratrem occidit" [About a painting of Romulus showing him killing his brother on the walls]. The Latin palindrome, a hexameter, reads "Nemo te cędis, murorum si decet omen."

While his chief task was to accurately translate the writings of Luxorius, Rosenblum also included a detailed introduction on the Vandals and Carthage, the Latin Anthology and the life of Luxorius. Following the translations, Rosenblum included further commentary.

== Criticisms ==
While information on the life and times of Luxorius may be scarce, articles and reviews on his work are more abundant. While the focus of many of these reviews is on the translation and additions by Rosenblum, there are several notes about Luxorius's actual writings.

In his review of A Latin Poet Among the Vandals, Richard Bruere writes, "...Luxorius' epigrams, although ingenious in their antitheses and on occasion almost neat, are chiefly remarkable examples of the wet squib, the joke that does not quite come off". On a similar note, in his review of these works, Robert Palmer writes, "I ask whether the epigrams of Luxorius might not have better remained in the obscurity of the Anthologia Latina whence they now emerge with introduction, translation, commentary and indexes". A link to an alternative interpretation by the poet Art Beck, including a translation of two Luxorius's poems, can be found in the secondary sources section of this article. Beck's translation of Luxorius' complete works, Opera Omnia or, A Duet for Sitar and Trombone was published in spring 2012 by Otis Books | Seismicity Editions.
