= Mary Lefkowitz =

American scholar of Classics (born 1935)

- Born: April 30, 1935 (age 91); New York, New York, United States
- Spouse: Sir Hugh Lloyd-Jones (m. 1982-2009; his death)

Academic background
- Education: Wellesley College (BA); Radcliffe College (PhD)

Academic work
- Institutions: Wellesley College
- Notable works: Not Out of Africa: How Afrocentrism Became an Excuse to Teach Myth as History; Black Athena Revisited

Mary R. Lefkowitz (born April 30, 1935) is an American scholar of Classics. She is the Professor Emerita of Classical Studies at Wellesley College in Wellesley, Massachusetts, where she previously worked from 1959 to 2005. She has published ten books over the course of her career.

Lefkowitz studied at Wellesley College before obtaining a Ph.D. in Classical Philology from Radcliffe College in 1961. During the 1980s much of her research focused on the place of women in the Classical world. She attracted broader attention for her 1996 book Not Out of Africa, a criticism of Afrocentric claims that ancient Greek civilization derived largely from that of ancient Egypt. She argued that such claims owed more to an American black nationalist political agenda than historical evidence. That decade, she also entered into a publicised argument with Africana studies scholar Tony Martin.

She served on the advisory board of the conservative advocacy group the National Association of Scholars.

== Biography ==
Lefkowitz was born to a Jewish family in New York City in 1935. She earned her B.A. from Wellesley College in 1957, Phi Beta Kappa with honors in Greek, and received her Ph.D. in Classical Philology from Radcliffe College (now part of Harvard University) in 1961. She returned to Wellesley College in 1959 as an instructor in Greek. In 1979 she was named Andrew W. Mellon Professor of the Humanities, a position she held until her retirement in 2005. Lefkowitz holds an honorary degree from Trinity College (1996), which cited her "deep concern for intellectual integrity," and also from the University of Patras (1999) and from Grinnell College (2000). In 2004 she received a Radcliffe Graduate Society Medal. In 2006 she was awarded a National Humanities Medal "for outstanding excellence in scholarship and teaching." In 2008 she was the recipient of a Wellesley College Alumnae Achievement Award.

Lefkowitz has published on subjects including mythology, women in antiquity, Pindar, and fiction in ancient biography. She came to the attention of a wider audience through her criticism of the claims of Martin Bernal in Black Athena: The Afroasiatic Roots of Classical Civilization in her book Not Out of Africa: How Afrocentrism Became an Excuse to Teach Myth As History. In Black Athena Revisited (1996), which she edited with Guy MacLean Rogers, her colleague at Wellesley College, the ideas of Martin Bernal are further scrutinized.

== Anti-Afrocentrism ==
The pinnacle of Mary Lefkowitz’s controversy surrounding Afrocentrism in the classics took form in her years-long scholarly debate with Martin Bernal. Bernal is the author of Black Athena: The Afroasiatic Roots of Classical Civilization, a work that argues the deep influence of Egyptian (and therefore African) influence on Greek culture, language, and society. The claims that Martin Bernal argues in his text alarmed Lefkowitz to such an extent that she wrote two extensive publications. The first, Black Athena: Revisited, is a collection of essays edited by Lefkowitz that responds directly to Bernal’s work with strong criticism. The second, Not Out of Africa: How Afrocentrism Became an Excuse to Teach Myth as History, is a text devoted to Lefkowitz’s anti-Afrocentrism argument, tying in her arguments against Bernal. The aforementioned work ignited what then became a continued back-and-forth between Lefkowitz and Bernal. Bernal wrote a response to Not Out of Africa in which he attacked the legitimacy of Lefkowitz’s argument. He argued that Lefkowitz “discover(s) what she wants and then fail(s) to check further”, and that her work is “sloppy” and clearly “written in a hurry”. He attacked her argument, and character, by discussing her view of history as being what he calls the “Aryan Model” of history, in this way associating her argument with a word associated with Nazism and White Supremacy. This response was quickly followed up by Lefkowitz with her own response: Lefkowitz on Bernal on Lefkowitz, Not Out of Africa. In this, she took a fiery tone against Bernal and defended her own claims while again working to refute Black Athena’s arguments.

This written debate culminated in a live debate when Lefkowitz and Guy MacLean Rogers joined in a discussion with Bernal, along with the Afrocentric scholar John Henrik Clarke. Much like the paper responses, this debate was heated, with interruptions and intense disagreements.

The controversy continued when Lefkowitz’s Black Athena Revisited was reviewed by Molefi Kete Asante. Asante criticized Lefkowitz for her perceived inability to believe that ancient Africans influenced Greek culture and claimed that racism was a primary component of classical historians' arguments, despite their assertions otherwise. Asante argued what he believed is the true argument that these historians, Lefkowitz included, sought to make: “Their contention, in the face of evidence, is that it is improbable and even impossible that a black civilization could have any significant impact on a white civilization.” Asante claimed the book's arguments were connected to a history of colonialism and white supremacy, concluding that Black Athena: Revisited is a “helpful book for African scholars who are able to see in this volume all the agency that whites give to themselves and what they take away from Africans.”

In 2008, Lefkowitz published History Lesson, which The Wall Street Journal described as a "personal account of what she experienced as a result of questioning the veracity of Afrocentrism and the motives of its advocates." She was attacked in newsletters from the Wellesley Africana Studies Department by her colleague Tony Martin. which turned into a rancorous, personal conflict with anti-Semitic elements. Martin stated in May 1994 at Cornell University that "Black people should interpret their own reality...Jews have been in the forefront of efforts to thwart the interpretation of our own history." In another incident described in her book, Yosef A. A. Ben-Jochannan, the author of Africa: The Mother of Western Civilization, gave the Martin Luther King lecture at Wellesley in 1993. Lefkowitz attended this lecture with her husband, Sir Hugh Lloyd-Jones. In that lecture, Ben-Jochannan stated that Aristotle stole his philosophy from the Library of Alexandria, Egypt. During the question and answer session following the lecture, Lefkowitz asked Ben-Jochannan, "How would that have been possible, when the library was not built until after his death?" Ben-Jochannan simply replied that the dates were uncertain. Sir Hugh responded, "Rubbish!" Lefkowitz writes that Ben-Jochannan proceeded to tell those present that "they could and should believe what black instructors told them" and "that although they might think that Jews were all 'hook-nosed and sallow faced,' there were other Jews who looked like himself."

== Personal life ==
Lefkowitz was married to Alan Lefkowitz, a Boston, Mass, lawyer, from 1956 to 1980. She was married to Sir Hugh Lloyd-Jones, Regius Professor Emeritus of Greek at Oxford University from 1982 until his death in 2009. She has two children, Rachel Lefkowitz, a copy editor, and Hannah Lefkowitz, and she is step-mother to Edward Lloyd-Jones, Ralph Lloyd-Jones, and Antonia Lloyd-Jones, an award-winning translator of Polish literature.

== Books ==
- The Victory Ode : An Introduction (1976), ISBN 0-8155-5045-6 ISBN 978-0815550457
- Heroines and Hysterics (1981), ISBN 0-7156-1518-1 ISBN 978-0715615188
- The Lives of the Greek Poets (1981), ISBN 0-8018-2748-5 ISBN 978-0801827488
- Women's Life in Greece and Rome (1982), editor, with Maureen Fant, ISBN 0-8018-8310-5 ISBN 978-0801883101
- Women in Greek Myth (1986), ISBN 0-8018-8649-X ISBN 978-0801886492
- First-person Fictions : Pindar's Poetic "I" (1991), ISBN 0-19-814686-8 ISBN 978-0198146865
- Black Athena Revisited (1996), ISBN 0-8078-4555-8 ISBN 978-0807845554
- Not Out of Africa: How Afrocentrism Became an Excuse to Teach Myth As History (1997), ISBN 0-465-09838-X ISBN 978-0465098385
- Greek Gods, Human Lives: What We Can Learn From Myths (2003), ISBN 0-300-10769-2 ISBN 978-0300107692
- History Lesson (2008), ISBN 0-300-12659-X ISBN 978-0300126594
- Lefkowitz, Mary R. “The Powers Of The Primeval Goddesses.” The American Scholar, 1989, pp. 586–591. (1989)
- Lefkowitz, Mary R. “The Origins Of Greek Civilization: An Afrocentric Theory.” The Gail A. Burnett Lectures In Classics, 14 Apr. 1997. (1997)

== See also ==
- Classics
- Afrocentrism
- Zahi Hawass
- Frank M. Snowden, Jr.
