= Martin Bernal =

British political historian (1937- 2013)

Martin Gardiner Bernal (/bərˈnɑːl/; 10 March 1937 – 9 June 2013) was a British scholar of modern Chinese political history. He was a Professor of Government and Near Eastern Studies at Cornell University. He gained notoriety for his book Black Athena, work which argues that the culture, language, and political structure of Ancient Greece contained substantial influences from Ancient Egypt and Syria-Palestine.

== Early life and education ==
Bernal was born and grew up in Hampstead, London, the son of the physicist John Desmond Bernal and artists' patron Margaret Gardiner. He was educated at Dartington Hall School and then at King's College, Cambridge, where he was awarded a degree in 1961 with first-class Honours in the Oriental Studies Tripos. At that time he specialised in the language and history of China, and spent some time at Peking University. He carried on as a graduate student at Cambridge, and with the assistance of the Harkness Commonwealth Fellowship also at University of California, Berkeley and Harvard University, finishing his PhD in Cambridge in 1965 with thesis titled Chinese Socialism to 1913 when he was elected a fellow at King's.

== Career ==
In 1972 Bernal moved to Cornell University in New York, United States. There he resided in the Telluride House as a faculty fellow, and became a full professor in 1988. He taught there for the rest of his career, retiring in 2001.

Initially he taught Government Studies at Cornell, and continued his research on modern Chinese history. Under the impact of the Vietnam War he had also developed an interest in Vietnamese history and culture, and learned the Vietnamese language.

From about 1975, however, Bernal underwent a radical shift in his interests. In his own words:

The scattered Jewish components of my ancestry would have given nightmares to assessors trying to apply the Nuremberg Laws, and although pleased to have these fractions, I had not previously given much thought to them or to Jewish culture. It was at this stage that I became intrigued—in a Romantic way—in this part of my 'roots'. I started looking into ancient Jewish history and— being on the periphery myself—into the relationship between the Israelites and the surrounding peoples, particularly the Canaanites and the Phoenicians. I had always known that the latter spoke Semitic languages, but it came as quite a shock to learn that Hebrew and Phoenician were mutually intelligible and that serious linguists treated both as a dialect of a single Canaanite language.
During this time, I was beginning to study Hebrew and I found what seemed to me a number of striking similarities between it and Greek ...

Bernal came to the conclusion that ancient Greek accounts of Egyptian influence on their civilisation should be taken seriously. He had been interested in ancient Egypt since childhood, in part inspired by his grandfather Sir Alan Gardiner, the renowned English Egyptologist, linguist and philologist, who was present at the discovery of Tutankhamen's tomb in 1922 (Gardiner's sign list). Bernal's new direction was strengthened by his discovery of the work of Cyrus Gordon and Michael Astour. In due course he wrote Black Athena.

Bernal also wrote the book Cadmean Letters, devoted to the origins of the Greek alphabet. He devoted his next twenty years to writing the next two volumes of Black Athena, with the second volume devoted to archaeological and documentary evidence, and the third to linguistic evidence. He also spent considerable time defending his work.

He became Professor Emeritus upon his retirement in 2001.

== Personal life ==
In 1961, Bernal married Judy Pace (later known as Judith Dunn). Together, they had one daughter and twin sons. They later divorced. His second wife, Leslie Miller-Bernal, and his five children survived him.

== Books ==
- Bernal, Martin (1966). Vietnam Signposts. London: Views Quarterly Review. (pamphlet)
- Bernal, Martin (1976). Chinese Socialism to 1907. Ithaca: Cornell University Press. ISBN 978-0-8014-0915-8.
- Bernal, Martin (1987). Black Athena: Afroasiatic Roots of Classical Civilization, Volume I: The Fabrication of Ancient Greece, 1785-1985. Rutgers University Press. ISBN 978-0-8135-1277-8.
- Bernal, Martin (1990). Cadmean Letters: The Transmission of the Alphabet to the Aegean and Further West Before 1400 B.C. Eisenbrauns. ISBN 978-0-931464-47-8.
- Bernal, Martin (1991). Black Athena: Afroasiatic Roots of Classical Civilization, Volume II: The Archaeological and Documentary Evidence. Rutgers University Press.
- Moore, David Chioni, ed. (2001). Black Athena Writes Back: Martin Bernal Responds to His Critics. Duke University Press. ISBN 978-0-8223-2706-6.
- Bernal, Martin (2006). Black Athena: The Afroasiatic Roots of Classical Civilization, Volume III: The Linguistic Evidence. Rutgers University Press. ISBN 978-1-85343-799-1.
- Bernal, Martin (2012). Geography of a Life. Bloomington: Xlibris. ISBN 978-1-4653-6375-6.

=== Responses ===
- Lefkowitz, Mary (1996). Guy M. Rogers (ed.). Black Athena Revisited. University of North Carolina Press. (critical response)
- Lefkowitz, Mary (1997). Not Out of Africa: How Afrocentrism Became an Excuse to Teach Myth as History. Basic Books. ISBN 978-0-465-09838-5.
- Lefkowitz, Mary (2008). History Lesson: A Race Odyssey. Yale University Press.
- Berlinerblau, Jacques (1999). Heresy in the University: The Black Athena Controversy and the Responsibilities of American Intellectuals. Rutgers University Press.
- Clarence E. Walker (2001). We Can't Go Home Again: An Argument About Afrocentrism. Oxford University Press. ISBN 978-0195095715.
- Ronald H. Fritze (2011). Invented Knowledge: False History, Fake Science and Pseudo-religions. Reaktion Books. ISBN 978-1861898173.
