= Jacques Berlinerblau =

Professor at Georgetown University

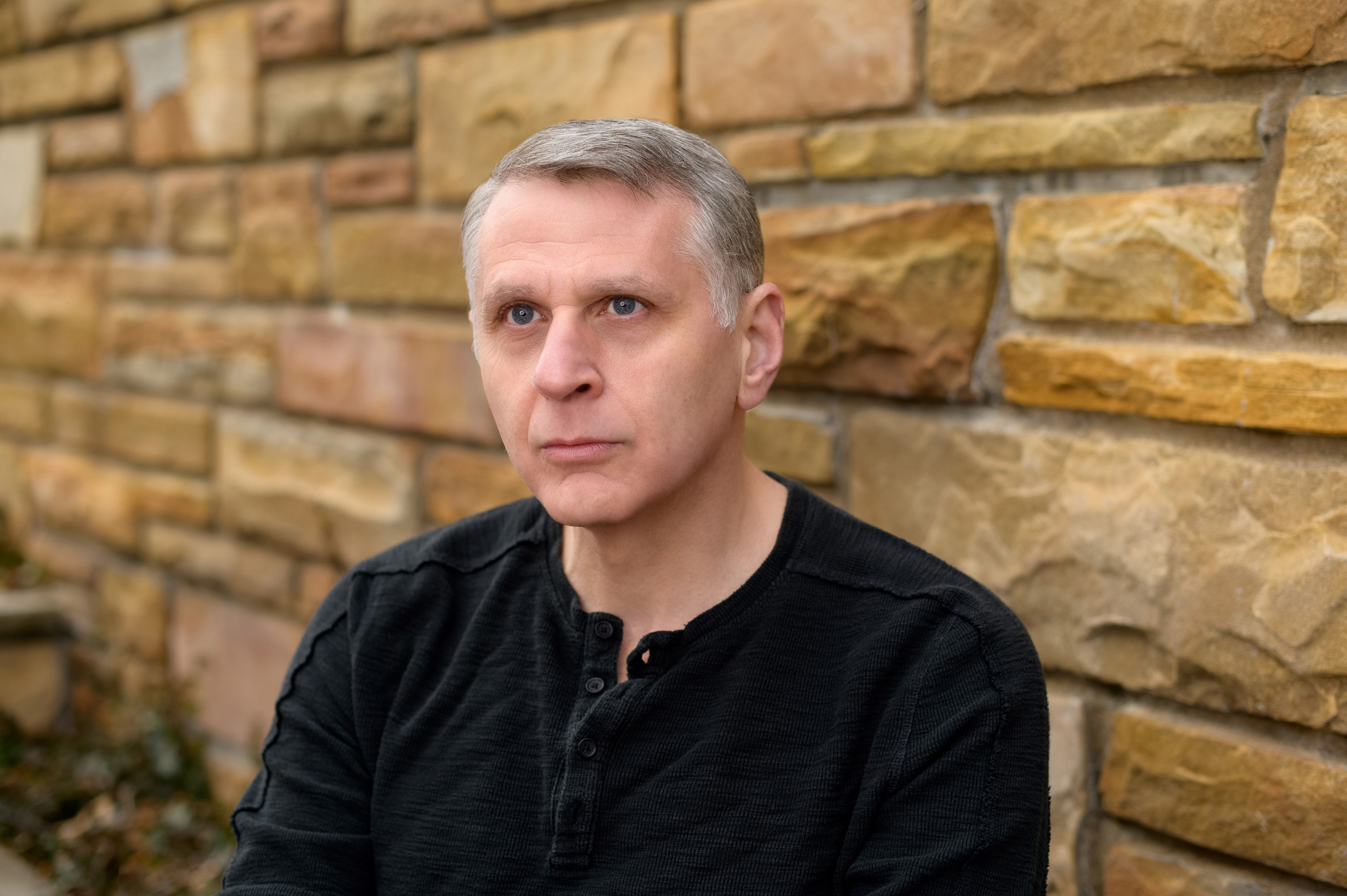
- Berlinerblau in 2021
- Born: July 6, 1966 (age 60); Portland, Maine, U.S.
- Education: New York University; The New School
- Occupations: Professor, Jewish Civilization, Edmund A. Walsh School of Foreign Service, Georgetown University

Jacques Berlinerblau is a professor of Jewish Civilization at the Edmund A. Walsh School of Foreign Service at Georgetown University. He has doctorates in Ancient Near Eastern languages and literature (from NYU) and theoretical sociology (from the New School for Social Research). He has published ten books on a wide variety of scholarly subjects with special attention to secularism, secular aesthetics, Jewish-American literature (Philip Roth's fiction in particular), African-American and Jewish-American relations and biblical literature. Berlinerblau has also written about professors and their discontents in Campus Confidential: How College Works, Or Doesn't, For Professors, Students, and Parents and in numerous articles about the Humanities for The Chronicle of Higher Education.

From 2007 to 2009 he wrote the blog The God Vote, an exploration of the role of faith in the 2008 U.S. presidential race, for Newsweek 's On Faith website.

Berlinerblau hosted and produced the show Faith Complex which was described as "a dialogue about the intersection of religion, politics and art." In 2010 he launched a second show with The Washington Post's Sally Quinn entitled "The God Vote" which focussed on news cycle issues involving faith and politics. In addition to this work in visual media, Berlinerblau blogged for The Chronicle of Higher Education's "Brainstorm" page between 2010 and 2012. He wrote about secularism, literature, and various subjects in higher education.

== Books ==
- Heresy in the University: The Black Athena Controversy and the Responsibilities of American Intellectuals (1999, Rutgers University Press) ISBN 0-8135-2588-8
- The Secular Bible: Why Nonbelievers Must Take Religion Seriously (2005, Cambridge University Press) ISBN 0-521-61824-X
- The Vow and the 'Popular Religious Groups' of Ancient Israel: A Philological & Sociological Inquiry (1996, Sheffield Academic Press) ISBN 1-85075-578-7
- Thumpin’ It: The Use and Abuse of the Bible in Today’s Presidential Politics (2008, Westminster John Knox) ISBN 978-0-664-23173-6
- How to be Secular: A Field Guide for Religious Moderates, Atheists and Agnostics (2012, Houghton-Mifflin Harcourt) ISBN 978-0-547-47334-5
- Campus Confidential: How College Works, or Doesn't, for Professors, Parents, and Students (2017, Melville House) ISBN 978-1612196428
- Secularism: The Basics (2021, Routledge) ISBN 9781000523423
