= Historical race concepts =

Obsolete definitions of racial groups

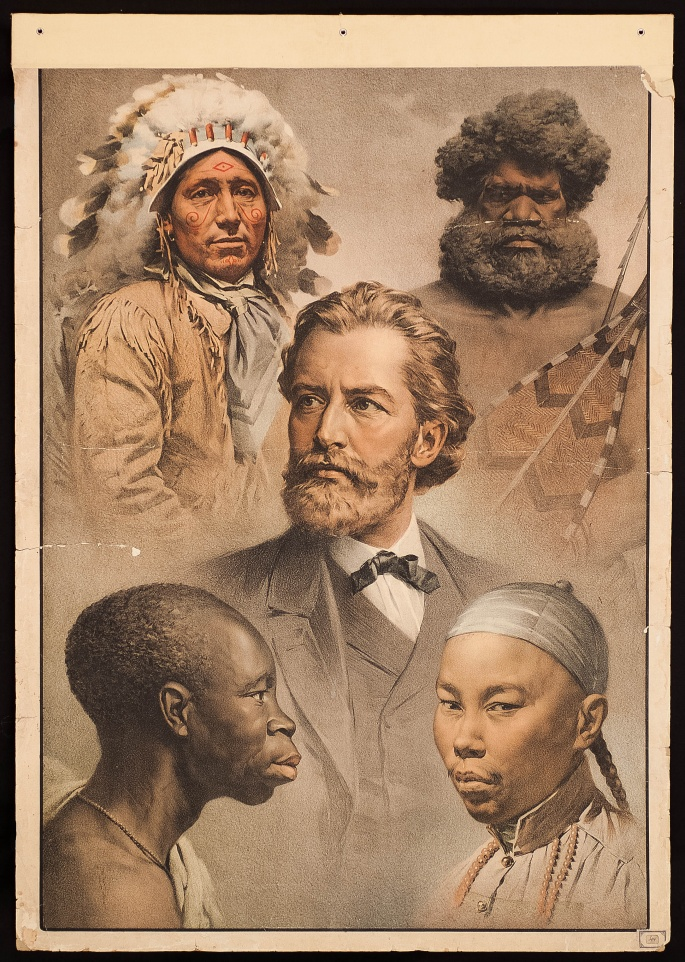
1911 poster of the "Five Races of Man"

The concept of race as a categorization of anatomically modern humans (Homo sapiens) has an extensive history in Europe and the Americas. The contemporary word race itself is modern; historically it was used in the sense of "nation, ethnic group" during the 16th to 19th centuries. Race acquired its modern meaning in the field of physical anthropology through scientific racism starting in the 19th century. With the rise of modern genetics, the concept of distinct human races in a biological sense has become obsolete. The American Anthropological Association's 1998 "Statement on Race" characterized race as a social construct rather than a biological reality.

== Etymology ==
The word "race", interpreted to mean an identifiable group of people who share a common descent, was introduced into English in the 16th century from the Old French rasse (1512), from Italian razza: the Oxford English Dictionary cites the earliest example around the mid-16th century and defines its early meaning as a "group of people belonging to the same family and descended from a common ancestor". It also introduces the first use of the word "race" as a term referring to an "ethnic group" in 1572. An earlier but etymologically distinct word for a similar concept was the Latin word genus meaning a group sharing qualities related to birth, descent, origin, race, stock, or family; this Latin word is cognate with the Greek words "genos" (γένος), meaning "race or kind", and "gonos", which has meanings related to "birth, offspring, stock ...".

== Early history ==
In many ancient civilizations, individuals with widely varying physical appearances became full members of a society by growing up within that society or by adopting that society's cultural norms (Snowden 1983; Lewis 1990).

=== Ancient Egypt ===
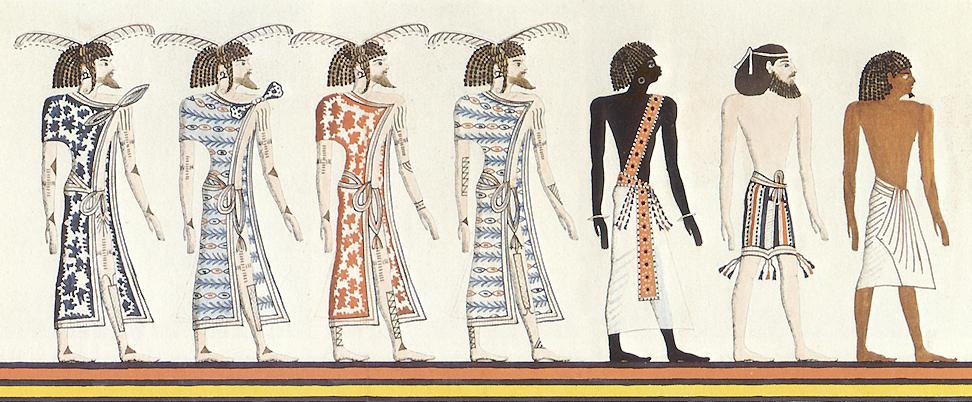
1820 drawing of a Book of Gates fresco of the tomb of Seti I, 1279 BC, depicting (from left) four groups of people: four Libyans, a Nubian, an Asiatic, and an Egyptian.

The Ancient Egyptian (New Kingdom) funerary text known as the Book of Gates distinguishes "four groups" in a procession. These are the "red-brown" Egyptians, the "pale" Levantine and Canaanite peoples or "Asiatics", the "black" "Nubians" and the "fair-skinned Libyans". The Egyptians are depicted as considerably darker-skinned than the Levantines (persons from what is now Lebanon, Israel, Palestine, Syria and Jordan) and Libyans, but considerably lighter than the Nubians (modern Sudan). Men would be painted dark reddish-brown, while women could be painted "white, tan, cream, or yellow". Classical archaeologists typically ascribe this divergence to the differing lifestyles of men and women. According to Charles Freeman, depictions of women with light skin suggested a high status, and were a "sign that a woman did not have to work in the sun".

=== Classical antiquity ===
Classical civilizations from Rome to China tended to invest the most importance in familial or tribal affiliation rather than an individual's physical appearance (Dikötter 1992; Goldenberg 2003). Societies still tended to equate physical characteristics, such as hair and eye colour, with psychological and moral qualities, usually assigning the highest qualities to their own people and lower qualities to the "Other", either lower classes or outsiders to their society. For example, a historian of the 3rd century Han dynasty in the territory of present-day China describes barbarians of blond hair and green eyes as resembling "the monkeys from which they are descended".

Dominant in ancient Greek and Roman conceptions of human diversity was the thesis that physical differences between different populations could be attributed to environmental factors. Though ancient peoples likely had no knowledge of evolutionary theory or genetic variability, their concepts of race could be described as malleable. Chief among environmental causes for physical difference in the ancient period were climate and geography. Though Greek thinkers in ancient civilizations recognized differences in physical characteristics between different populations, the general consensus among Greeks was that all non-Greeks were barbarians. This barbarian status, however, was not thought to be fixed; rather, one could shed the 'barbarian' status simply by adopting Greek culture. Classicist James H. Dee states "the Greeks do not describe themselves as 'White people' – or as anything else because they had no regular word in their colour vocabulary for themselves." According to the historian Nell Irvin Painter, people's skin colour did not carry useful meaning; what mattered is where they lived.

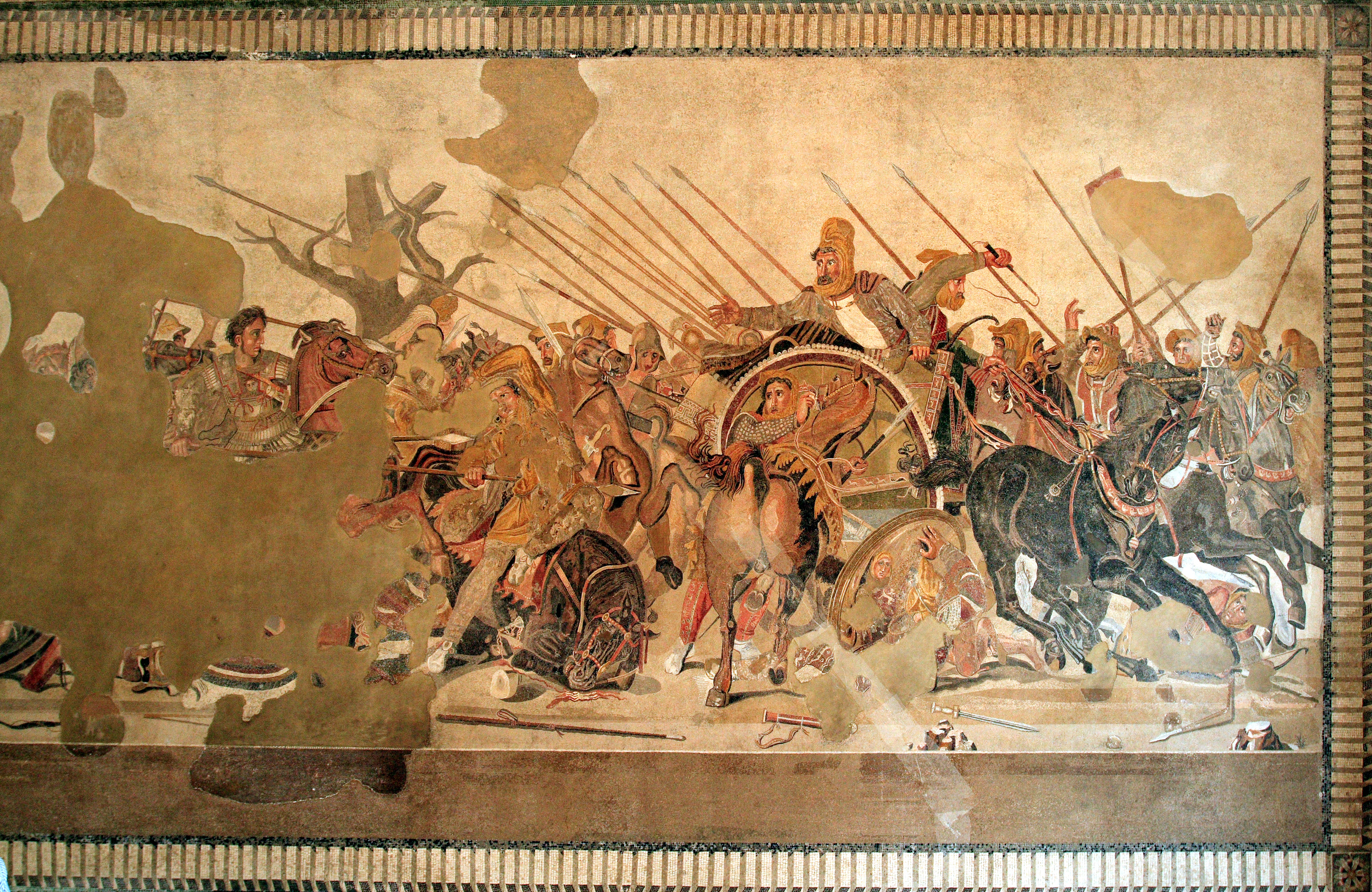
The Alexander Mosaic, Pompeii, c. 100 BC, depicting the Macedonian cavalry of Alexander the Great fighting Persians under Darius III at the Battle of Issus in 333 BC

Nevertheless, some commentary from Ancient Greece has been recognized by some scholars as racial. The anonymous ancient Greek text the 'Alexander Romance' describes an exchange of letters between Alexander the Great and Queen Candace of Meroe (in Nubia), in which the queen writes: "Do not despise us for the colour of our skin. In our souls we are brighter than the whitest of your people." Herodotus described the Scythian Budini as having deep blue eyes and bright red hair and the Egyptians – quite like the Colchians – as melánchroes (μελάγχροες, "dark-skinned") and curly-haired. Later, Xenophanes of Colophon described the Aethiopians as black and snub-nosed and the Thracians as having red hair and blue eyes. In his description of the Scythians, Hippocrates states that the cold weather "burns their white skin and turns it ruddy." The 2nd century Greek sophist Polemon of Laodicea described the "pure Greek" as "white in colour, mixed with red" with "bluish-black" eyes.

In the second of his Satires, the Roman satirist Juvenal writes "let the straight-legged man laugh at the club-footed man, the white man (albus) at the black (Aethiops)", although many varying translations are possible. In his fictional dialogue Hermotimus, the Hellenised Syrian satirist Lucian speculates on whether an isolated Ethiopian would assume out of hand that there are no "white or yellow" men on Earth.

Ancient Romans used the term candidus, a neutral term for "white," to refer to themselves. Romans would also use the term albus (translation: 'white'), which refers to the physical phenomenon of whiteness, to refer to their skin colour. The Roman writer Julius Firmicus Maternus would contrast the Germaniae candidi (white Germans) with 'Ethiopians', while Pliny spoke of Northern Europeans having candida atque glacialis cutis or "white and frosty skins". The term candidus was later replaced during the Germanic invasion of Rome by the term blancus, which served a similar purpose, and which has survived in modern languages such as French blanc, Spanish blanco, Portuguese branco, and Italian bianco. Like candidus, blancus, was a neutral term used for Caucasian peoples.

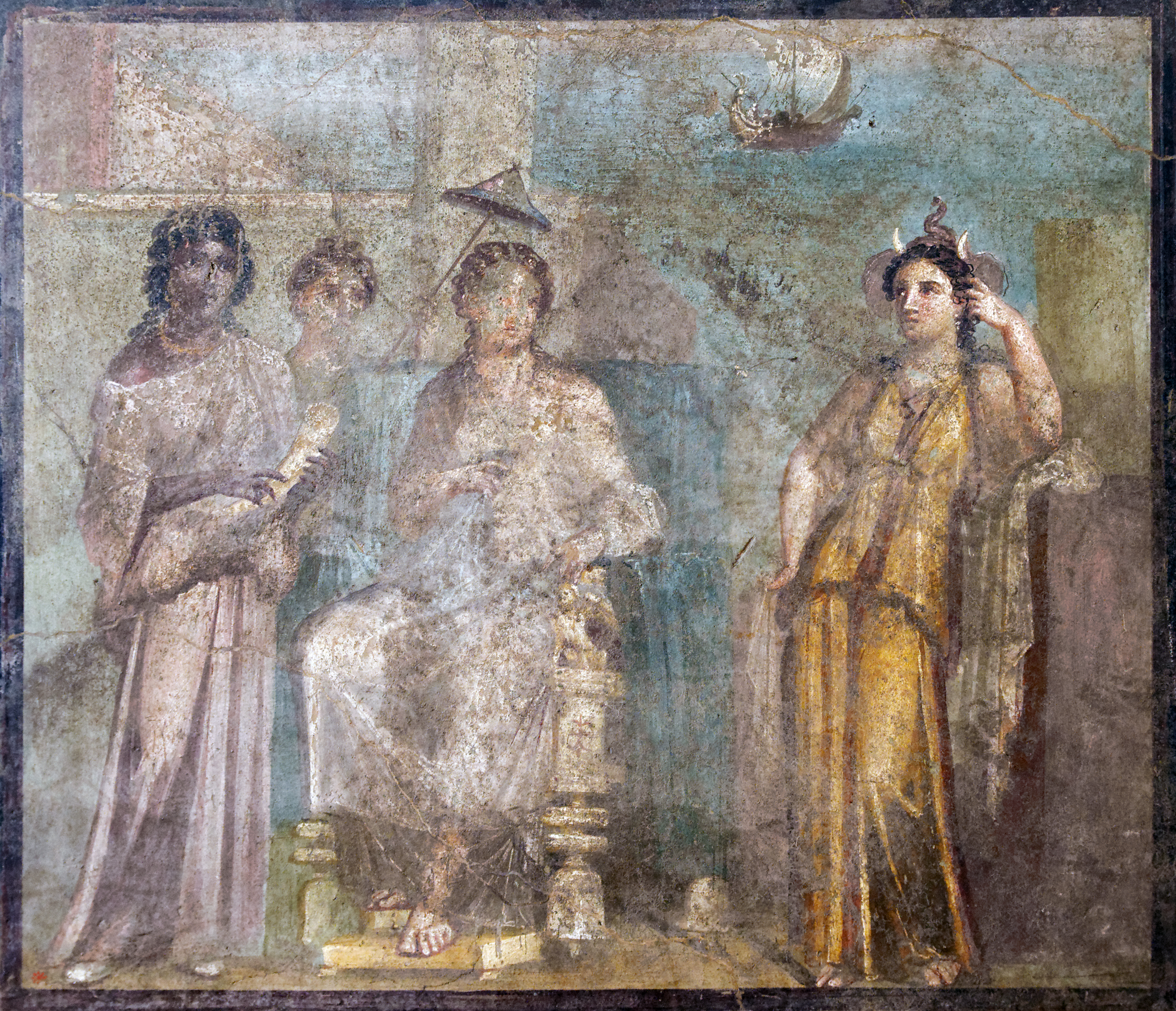
1st-century AD Pompeian fresco, showing Dido, enthroned, attended by a handmaiden (left), looking towards the personification of Africa (right)

According to Lloyd A. Thompson, terms such as Aethiop, which Romans used for black people, carried no social implications, although “blacks in Roman society were at all times largely slave-immigrants or progeny of such immigrants" and "their numbers were always small”. Though phenotype-related stereotypes certainly existed in Ancient Rome, inherited physical characteristics were typically not relevant to social status. The historian Frank M. Snowden has stated that people who looked different from the typical Mediterranean populace, such as black people, were not excluded from any profession and there are no records of stigmas or biases against mixed race relationships. In contrast, the classicist Michele George writes that "The somatic differences of Blacks reinforced their visible difference from Italian aesthetic norms and facilitated a connection with slaves, the proverbial aliens in Roman thought. Thus, although their numbers among the slave population were relatively small, the presence of Blacks in Roman art is dominated by the slave context."

Several Roman authors, such as Tacitus and Suetonius, expressed concerns in their writings about Roman "blood purity" as Roman citizens from outside of Roman Italy increased in number. Their concerns did not match modern ideas of race or ethnicity, and had little to do with features such as skin colour or physical appearance.

=== Late antiquity ===
In late antiquity, some early Christian writers began connecting the metaphorical goodness and morality associated in European culture with the colour white to the physical skin colour itself, while at the same time associating the negative concepts attached to the colour black with dark skin. For example, the writer Paulinus of Nola claimed that Ethiopians had been turned black due to committing vices. Similarly, Gregory of Nyssa believed that "Christ came into the world to make blacks white … Babylonians into Jerusalemites, the prostitute into a virgin, Ethiopians radiantly white." When speaking of baptising an Ethiopian, Fulgentius of Ruspe said he saw the Ethiopian as one who was "not yet whitened by the grace of Christ." According to a 7th-century biography, Pope Gregory I bemoaned the presence of Anglo-Saxon child slaves in Rome who were "white of body and have blonde hair". In the 8th century, the English monk The Venerable Bede, generally associated the black skin of Ethiopians with "spiritual darkness" but at the same time rejected any idea that the colour differences between, as he termed it, "a black Ethiopian and a white Saxon" would affect their fates during the Last Judgement.

The 6th-century Byzantine scholar Procopius referred to various invading barbarian tribes as being white, such as the Gothic tribes who he claimed had "white bodies and fair hair" and the Hephthalites or "White Huns" who, according to him, had "white bodies and countenances". Indian scholars also referred to the Hephthalites as Sveta Huna (White Huns).

=== Middle Ages ===
European medieval models of race generally mixed Classical ideas with the notion that humanity as a whole was descended from Shem, Ham and Japheth, the three sons of Noah, producing distinct Semitic (Asiatic), Hamitic (African), and Japhetic (Indo-European) peoples. Some critics have alleged that the association between the sons of Noah and skin color dates back at least to the Babylonian Talmud, which some have argued states that the descendants of Ham were cursed with black skin. In the seventh century, the idea that black Africans were cursed with both dark skin and slavery began to gain strength with some Islamic writers, as black Africans became a slave class in the Islamic world.

In the 14th century, the Islamic sociologist Ibn Khaldun, dispelled the Babylonian Talmud's account of peoples and their characteristics as a myth. He wrote that black skin was due to the hot climate of sub-Saharan Africa and not due to the descendants of Ham being cursed. Independently of Ibn Khaldun's work, the question of whether skin colour is heritable or a product of the environment is raised in 17th to 18th century European anthropology. Georgius Hornius (1666) inherits the rabbinical view of heritability, while François Bernier (1684) argues for at least partial influence of the environment.

==== Christendom ====
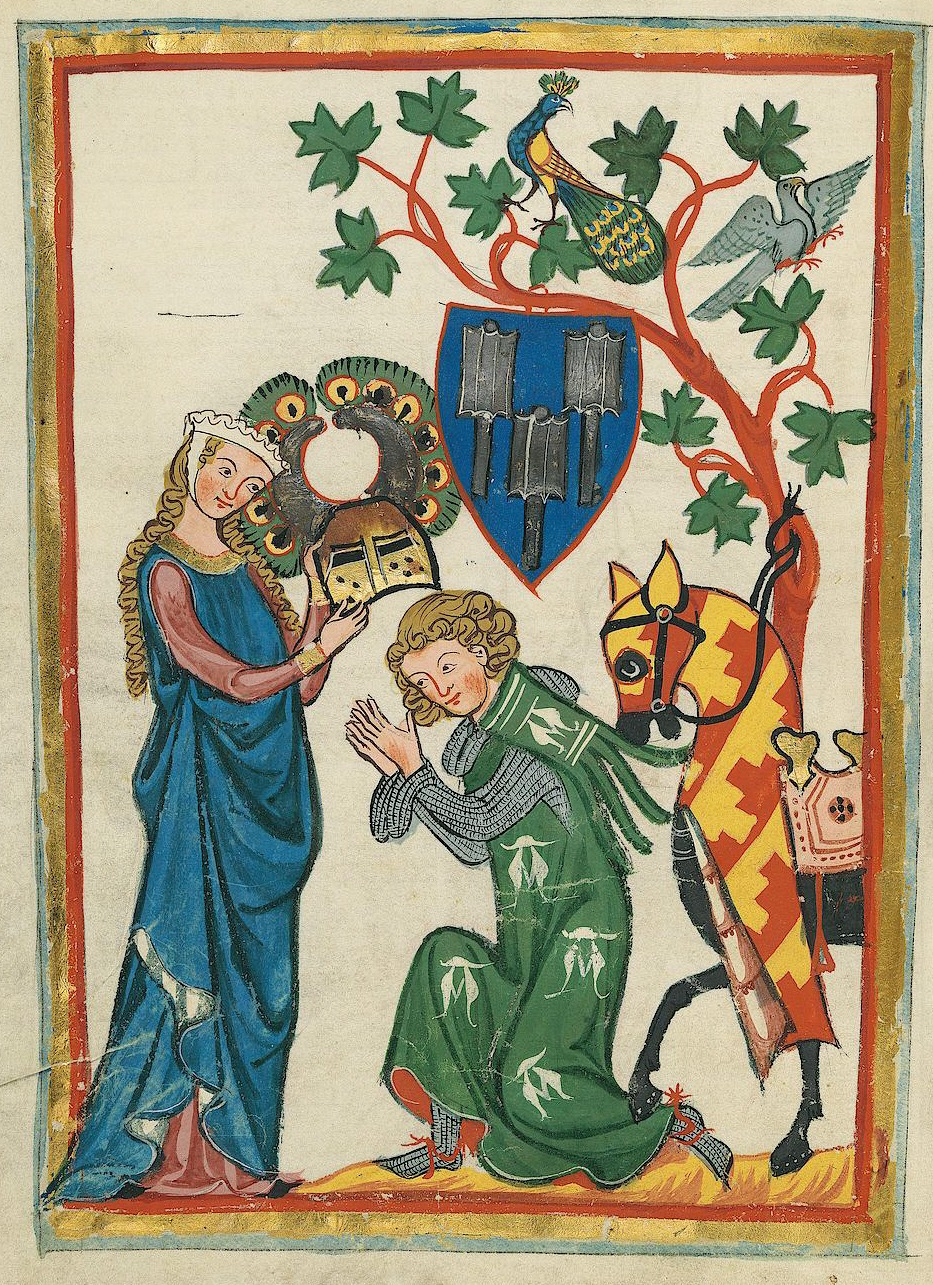
Konrad von Limpurg as a knight being armed by his lady. Codex Manesse, c. 1304–40.

Medieval ideas about skin colour were complex. Dark skin – depicted in art using brown, black, blue, grey and sometimes purple hues – often signified negative moral and spiritual qualities distinct from physical appearance. Thus, the image of Saladin facing Richard I in the 14th century Luttrell Psalter depicts the Saracen with dark blue skin and a monstrous expression. Christian theologians, for whom blackness represented sin and the devil, describe the newly baptised as "whitened" by the washing away of their sins.

By the Late Middle Ages, the idealised, light-skinned features of high status figures in Gothic art signalled their moral purity, social rank, and political authority. The princesses of Chivalric romance and the noble ladies of courtly love literature similarly combined white skin with other positive social markers: slender proportions, graceful bearing, and expensive dress.

The ideal of feminine beauty was formalised in the 12th century by Matthew of Vendôme in the Ars Versificatoria, which includes two descriptions Helen of Troy as a model. In the first example, her forehead is white as paper, the space between her eyes white and clear (a "milky way"), her colouring white and red (like rose and snow), and her teeth like ivory. In the second portrait, her forehead is like milk, teeth like ivory, neck like snow, legs fleshy (or white).

==== Dar al-Islam ====
In the 9th century, Al-Jahiz, an Afro-Arab Islamic philosopher, attempted to explain the origins of different human skin colors, particularly black skin, which he believed to be the result of the environment. He cited a stony region of black basalt in the northern Najd as evidence for his theory.

Muslim scholars of the Islamic Golden Age, such as Avicenna, described the northern tribes bordering the Muslim world as white; Avicenna writes: "The Slavs acquire whiteness / Until their Skins turn soft." The Arab explorer Ahmad ibn Fadlan during his northern travels detailed the Rus' people of the Viking Age as being "blonde and ruddy" and "big men with white bodies." The medieval Muslim sociologist Ibn Khaldun noted that those north of the Arabic-speaking world typically didn't use the term white:

The inhabitants of the north are not called by their color, because the people who established the conventional meanings of the words were themselves white. Thus whiteness was something usual and common to them, and they did not see anything sufficiently remarkable in it to cause them to use it as a specific term.

— Ibn Khaldun, Muqaddimah (1377)

The medieval Arab world used various terminology for people in reference to their skin colour with terms like al-bidan and al-abyad meaning "white people" and al-Sudan and Zanj meaning "black people". In general in the Arab world, the term "white" was used to refer to Arabs, Persians, Greeks, Turks, Slavs, and other peoples in the north.

Different labels were used to categorise enslaved persons in Islamic society, with white slaves being referred to as mamlūk ("owned") and black slaves referred to as abd ("slave"); white eunuchs were referred to as jarādiyya ("locusts") and black eunuchs were referred to as ghurābiyya ("ravens"). The Christian Arab intellectual Ibn Butlan of Baghdad wrote the first slave vade mecum, or handbook, in the 11th century, which recorded and described different ethnic and racial groups, dividing white slaves from black slaves and suggesting different tasks for each group based on their attributes. According to Bernard Lewis, white slaves could also conceivably become "generals, provincial governors, sovereigns and founders of dynasties", while such positions were rarely bestowed upon black slaves; likewise, emancipated white slaves were offered more opportunities for social advancement in Arab society than emancipated black slaves.

== Early modern period ==
Scientists who were interested in natural history, including biological and geological scientists, were known as "naturalists". They would collect, examine, describe, and arrange data from their explorations into categories according to certain criteria. People who were particularly skilled at organizing specific sets of data in a logically and comprehensive fashion were known as classifiers and systematists. This process was a new trend in science that served to help answer fundamental questions by collecting and organizing materials for systematic study, also known as taxonomy.

As the study of natural history grew, so did scientists' effort to classify human groups. Some zoologists and scientists wondered what made humans different from animals in the primate family. Furthermore, they contemplated whether homo sapiens should be classified as one species with multiple varieties or separate species. In the 16th and 17th century, scientists attempted to classify Homo sapiens based on a geographic arrangement of human populations based on skin color, others simply on geographic location, shape, stature, food habits, and other distinguishing characteristics. Occasionally the term "race" was used, but most of the early taxonomists used classificatory terms, such as "peoples", "nations", "types", "varieties", and "species".

Italian philosopher Giordano Bruno (1548–1600) and French philosopher Jean Bodin (1530–1596), attempted a rudimentary geographic arrangement of known human populations based on skin color. Bodin's color classifications were purely descriptive, including neutral terms such as "duskish colour, like roasted quinze", "black", "chestnut", and "farish white".

=== 17th century ===
German scientist Bernhard Varen (1622–1650) and English scientist John Ray (1627–1705) classified human populations into categories according to stature, shape, food habits, and skin color, along with any other distinguishing characteristics. Ray was also the first person to produce a biological definition of species.

François Bernier (1625–1688) is believed to have developed the first comprehensive classification of humans into distinct races which was published in a French journal article in 1684, Nouvelle division de la terre par les différentes espèces ou races l'habitant, (New division of Earth by the different species or races which inhabit it). (Gossett, 1997:32–33). Bernier advocated using the "four quarters" of the globe as the basis for providing labels for human differences. The four subgroups that Bernier used were Europeans, Far Easterners, "Negroes", and "Lapps".

=== 18th century ===
As noted earlier, scientists attempted to classify Homo sapiens based on a geographic arrangement of human populations. Some based their hypothetical divisions of race on the most obvious physical differences, like skin color, while others used geographic location, shape, stature, food habits, and other distinguishing characteristics to delineate between races. However, cultural notions of racial and gender superiority tainted early scientific discovery. In the 18th century, scientists began to include behavioral or psychological traits in their reported observations—which traits often had derogatory or demeaning implications—and researchers often assumed that those traits were related to their race, and therefore, innate and unchangeable. Other areas of interest were to determine the exact number of races, categorize and name them, and examine the primary and secondary causes of variation between groups.

The great chain of being, a medieval idea that there was a hierarchical structure of life from the most fundamental elements to the most perfect, began to encroach upon the idea of race. The tenth edition of Systema Naturae, by Carl Linnaeus, represents an early example of this. Although Linnaeus' work classified human varieties, as taxonomy grew, subsequent scientists would classify human races as distinct subspecies. One's "race" necessarily implied that one group had certain character qualities and physical dispositions that differentiated it from other human populations. Values were then assigned to those differentiations, as well as other, more trivial traits (a man with a strong chin was assumed to possess a stronger character than men with weaker chins). This essentially created a gap between races by deeming one race superior or inferior to another race, thus creating a hierarchy of races. In this way, science was used as justification for unfair treatment of different human populations.

The systematization of race concepts during the Enlightenment period brought with it the conflict between monogenism (a single origin for all human races) and polygenism (the hypothesis that races had separate origins). This debate was originally cast in creationist terms as a question of one versus many creations of humanity, but continued after evolution was widely accepted, at which point the question was given in terms of whether humans had split from their ancestral species one or many times.

==== Johann Friedrich Blumenbach ====
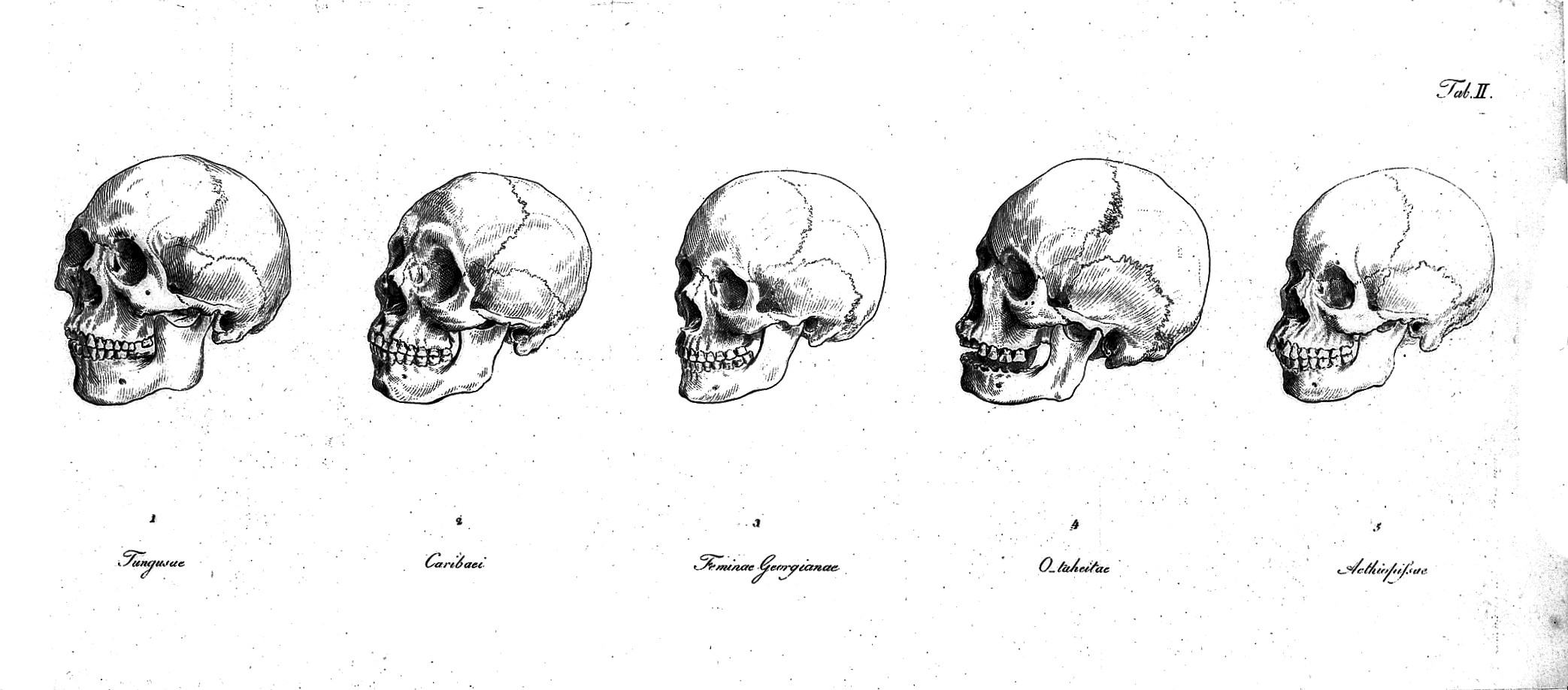
Blumenbach's five races

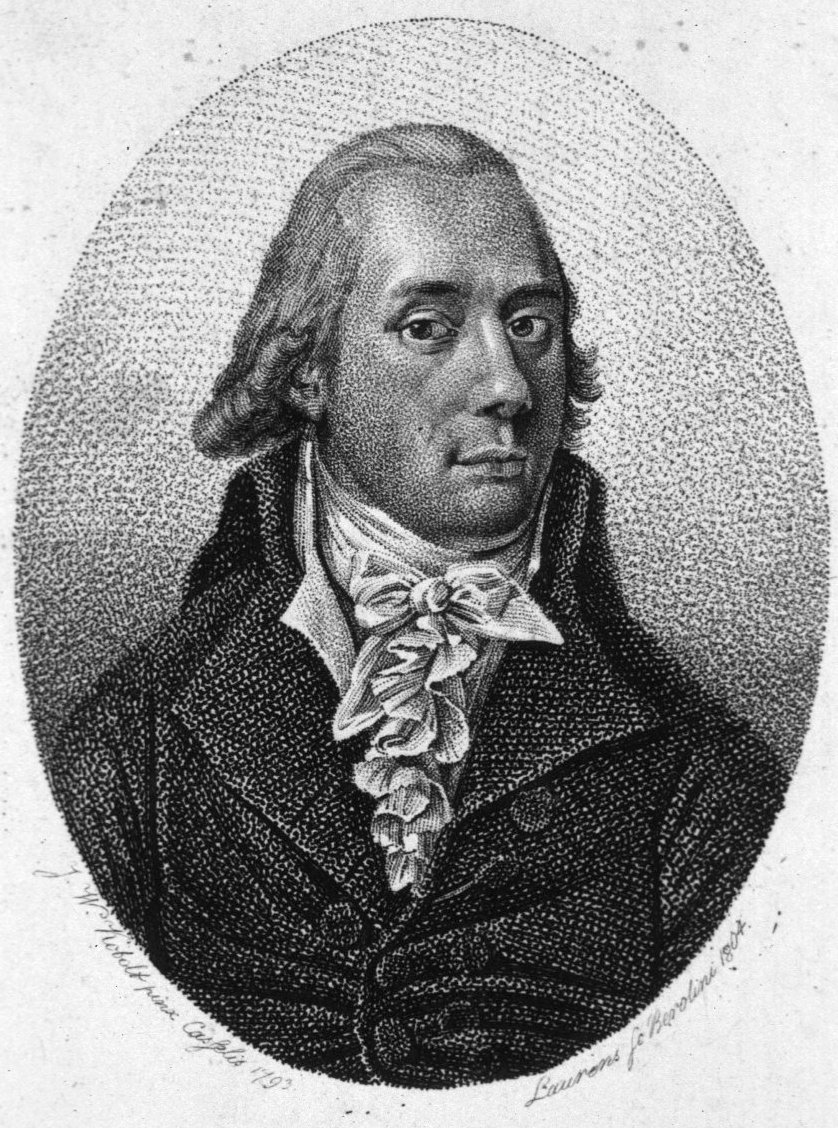
Johann Friedrich Blumenbach

Johann Friedrich Blumenbach (1752–1840) divided the human species into five races in 1779, later founded on crania research (description of human skulls), and called them (1793/1795):

- the Caucasian or white race. Blumenbach was the first to use this term for Europeans, but the term would later be reinterpreted to also include Middle Easterners and South Asians.
- the Mongolian or yellow race, including all East Asians.
- the Malayan or brown race, including Southeast Asians and Pacific Islanders.
- the Ethiopian or black race, including all sub-Saharan Africans.
- the American or red race, including all Native Americans.

Blumenbach argued that physical characteristics like the collective characteristic types of facial structure and hair characteristics, skin color, cranial profile, etc., depended on geography and nutrition and custom. Blumenbach's work included his description of sixty human crania (skulls) published originally in fascicules as Decas craniorum (Göttingen, 1790–1828). This was a founding work for other scientists in the field of craniometry.

Further anatomical study led him to the conclusion that "individual Africans differ as much, or even more, from other individual Africans as Europeans differ from Europeans". Furthermore, he concluded that Africans were not inferior to the rest of mankind "concerning healthy faculties of understanding, excellent natural talents and mental capacities".

"Finally, I am of opinion that after all these numerous instances I have brought together of negroes of capacity, it would not be difficult to mention entire well-known provinces of Europe, from out of which you would not easily expect to obtain off-hand such good authors, poets, philosophers, and correspondents of the Paris Academy; and on the other hand, there is no so-called savage nation known under the sun which has so much distinguished itself by such examples of perfectibility and original capacity for scientific culture, and thereby attached itself so closely to the most civilized nations of the earth, as the Negro."

These five groups saw some continuity in the various classification schemes of the 19th century, in some cases augmented, e.g. by the Australoid race and the Capoid race, in some cases the Mongolian (East Asian) and American collapsed into a single group.

== Racial anthropology (1850–1930) ==
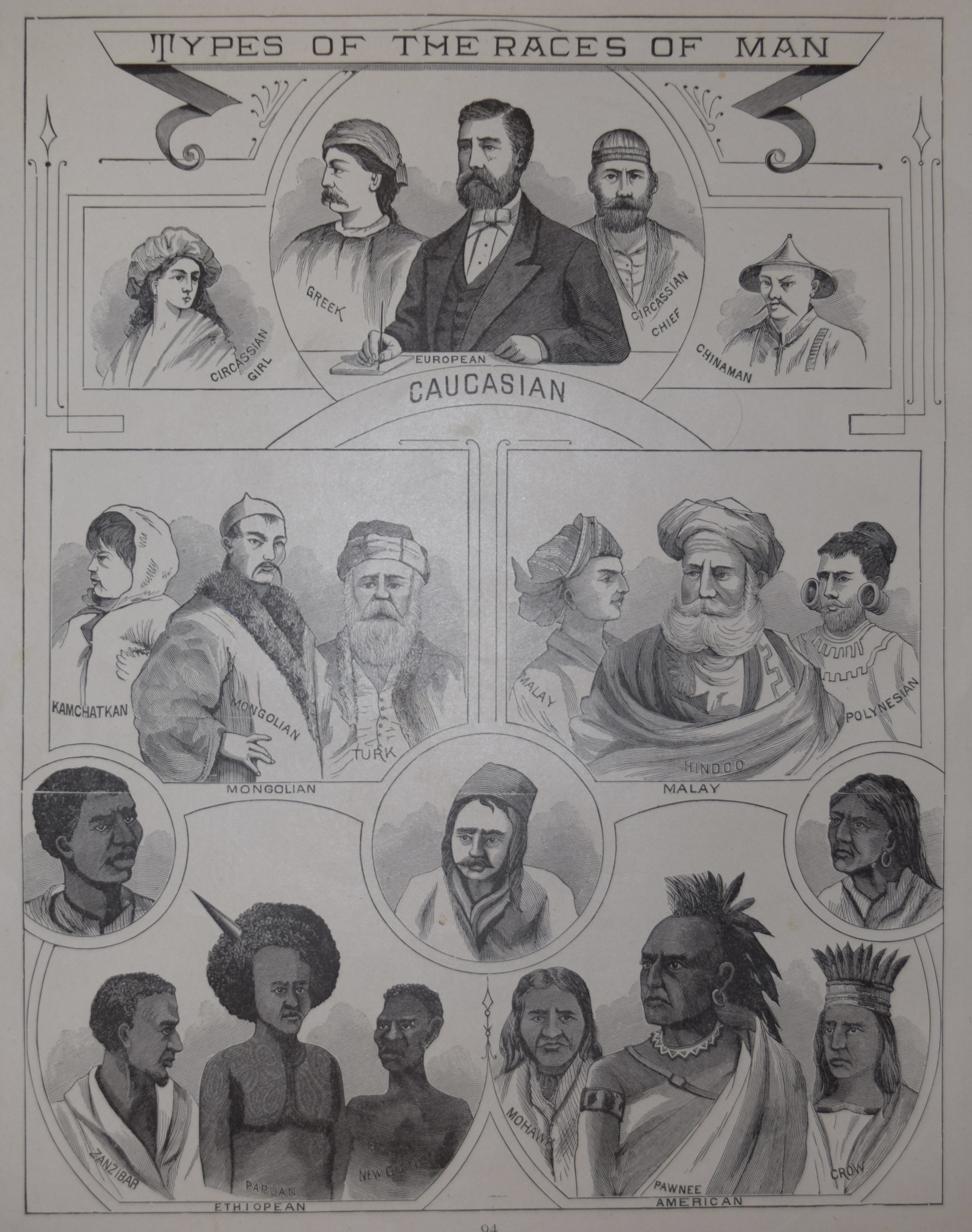
Engraving depicting what was considered "The Types of Races of Men" by the author

Among the 19th century naturalists who defined the field were Georges Cuvier, James Cowles Pritchard, Louis Agassiz, and Charles Pickering (Races of Man and Their Geographical Distribution, 1848). Cuvier enumerated three races, Pritchard seven, Agassiz twelve, and Pickering eleven.

The 19th century saw the introduction of anthropological techniques such as anthropometrics, invented by Francis Galton and Alphonse Bertillon. They measured the shapes and sizes of skulls and related the results to group differences in intelligence or other attributes.

Stefan Kuhl wrote that the eugenics movement rejected the racial and national hypotheses of Arthur Gobineau and his writing An Essay on the Inequality of the Human Races. According to Kuhl, the eugenicists believed that nations were political and cultural constructs, not race constructs, because nations were the result of race mixtures. Georges Vacher de Lapouge's "anthroposociology", asserted as self-evident the biological inferiority of particular groups (Kevles 1985). In many parts of the world, the idea of race became a way of rigidly dividing groups by culture as well as by physical appearances (Hannaford 1996). Campaigns of oppression and genocide were often motivated by supposed racial differences.

During the late 19th century and early 20th century, the tension between some who believed in hierarchy and innate superiority, and others who believed in human equality, was paramount. The former continued to exacerbate the belief that certain races were innately inferior by examining their shortcomings, namely by examining and testing intelligence between groups. Some scientists claimed that there was a biological determinant of race by evaluating one's genes and DNA. Different methods of eugenics, the study and practice of human selective breeding often with a race as a primary concentration, was still widely accepted in Britain, Germany, and the United States. On the other hand, many scientists understood race as a social construct. They believed that the phenotypical expression of an individual were determined by one's genes that are inherited through reproduction but there were certain social constructs, such as culture, environment, and language that were primary in shaping behavioral characteristics. Some advocated that race 'should centre not on what race explains about society, but rather on the questions of who, why and with what effect social significance is attached to racial attributes that are constructed in particular political and socio-economic contexts', and thus, addressing the "folk" or "mythological representations" of race.

=== Louis Agassiz's racial definitions ===
After Louis Agassiz (1807–1873) traveled to the United States, he became a prolific writer in what has been later termed the genre of scientific racism. Agassiz was specifically a believer and advocate in polygenism, that races came from separate origins (specifically separate creations), were endowed with unequal attributes, and could be classified into specific climatic zones, in the same way he felt other animals and plants could be classified.

These included Western American Temperate (the indigenous peoples west of the Rockies); Eastern American Temperate (east of the Rockies); Tropical Asiatic (south of the Himalayas); Temperate Asiatic (east of the Urals and north of the Himalayas); South American Temperate (South America); New Holland (Australia); Arctic (Alaska and Arctic Canada); Cape of Good Hope (South Africa); and American Tropical (Central America and the West Indies).

Agassiz denied that species originated in single pairs, whether at a single location or at many. He argued instead multiple individuals in each species were created at the same time and then distributed throughout the continents where God meant for them to dwell. His lectures on polygenism were popular among the slaveholders in the southern United States, for many this opinion legitimized the belief in a lower standard of the Black slave.

His stance in this case was considered to be quite radical in its time, because it went against the more orthodox and standard reading of the Bible in his time which implied all human stock descended from a single couple (Adam and Eve), and in his defense Agassiz often used what now sounds like a very "modern" argument about the need for independence between science and religion; though Agassiz, unlike many polygeneticists, maintained his religious beliefs and was not anti-Biblical in general.

In the context of ethnology and anthropology of the mid-19th century, Agassiz's polygenetic views became explicitly seen as opposing Darwin's views on race, which sought to show the common origin of all human races and the superficiality of racial differences. Darwin's second book on evolution, The Descent of Man, features extensive argumentation addressing the single origin of the races, at times explicitly opposing Agassiz's theories.

=== Arthur de Gobineau ===
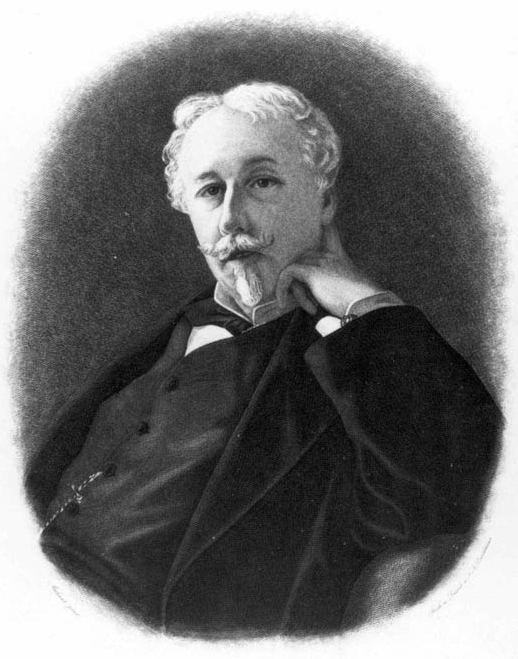
Gobineau in 1876

Arthur de Gobineau (1816–1882) was a successful diplomat for the Second French Empire. Initially he was posted to Persia, before working in Brazil and other countries. He came to believe that race created culture, arguing that distinctions between the three "black", "white", and "yellow" races were natural barriers, and that "race-mixing" breaks those barriers down and leads to chaos. He classified the populations of the Middle East, Central Asia, the Indian subcontinent, North Africa, and southern France as being racially mixed.

Gobineau also believed that the white race was superior to all others. He thought it corresponded to the ancient Indo-European culture, also known as "Aryan". Gobineau originally wrote that the white race's miscegenation was inevitable. He attributed much of the economic turmoils in France to the pollution of races. Later on in his life, he altered his opinion to believe that the white race could be saved.

To Gobineau, the development of empires was ultimately destructive to the "superior races" that created them, since they led to the mixing of distinct races. This he saw as a degenerative process.

According to his definitions, the people of Spain, most of France, most of Germany, southern and western Iran as well as Switzerland, Austria, Northern Italy, and a large part of Britain, consisted of a degenerative race that arose from miscegenation. Also according to him, the whole population of North India consisted of a yellow race.

=== Thomas Huxley's racial definitions ===
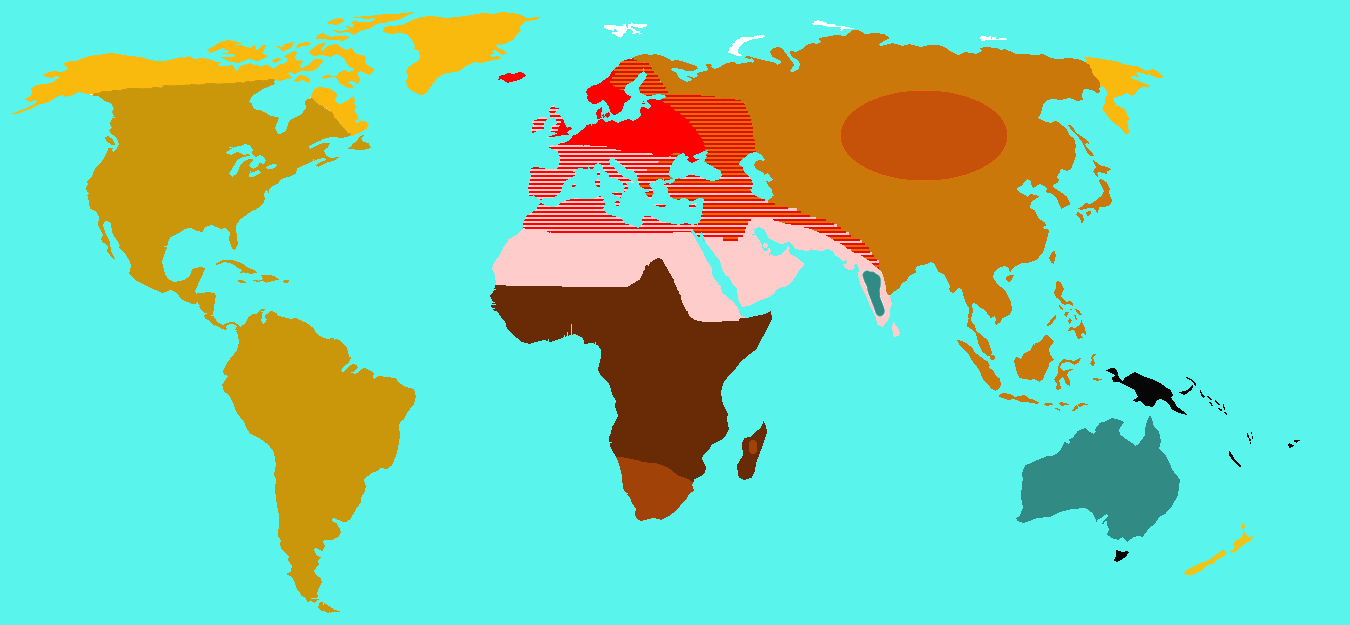
Huxley's map of racial categories from On the Geographical Distribution of the Chief Modifications of Mankind (1870): 1: Bushmen 2: Negroes 3: Negritoes 4: Melanochroi (including Hamites and Moors) 5: Australoids 6: Xanthochroi 7: Polynesians 8: Mongoloids A 8: Mongoloids B 8: Mongoloids C 9: Esquimaux Huxley states: 'It is to the Xanthochroi and Melanochroi, taken together, that the absurd denomination of "Caucasian" is usually applied'. He also indicates that he has omitted certain areas with complex ethnic compositions that do not fit into his racial paradigm, including much of the Horn of Africa and the Indian subcontinent. Huxley's Melanochroi eventually comprised various other dark Caucasoid populations, including the Hamites and Moors.

Thomas Huxley (1825–1895) wrote one paper, "On the Geographical Distribution of the Chief Modifications of Mankind" (1870), in which he proposed a distinction within the human species ('races'), and their distribution across the earth. He also acknowledged that certain geographical areas with more complex ethnic compositions, including much of the Horn of Africa and the India subcontinent, did not fit into his racial paradigm. As such, he noted that: "I have purposely omitted such people as the Abyssinians and the Hindoos, who there is every reason to believe result from the intermixture of distinct stocks." By the late nineteenth century, Huxley's Xanthochroi group had been redefined as the Nordic race, whereas his Melanochroi became the Mediterranean race. His Melanochroi thus eventually also comprised various other dark Caucasoid populations, including the Hamites (e.g. Berbers, Somalis, northern Sudanese, ancient Egyptians) and Moors.

Huxley's paper was rejected by the Royal Society, and this became one of the many theories to be advanced and dropped by the early exponents of evolution.

Despite rejection by Huxley and the science community, the paper is sometimes cited in support of racialism. Along with Darwin, Huxley was a monogenist, the belief that all humans are part of the same species, with morphological variations emerging out of an initial uniformity. (Stepan, p. 44). This view contrasts with polygenism, the theory that each race is actually a separate species with separate sites of origin.

Despite Huxley's monogenism and his abolitionism on ethical grounds, Huxley assumed a hierarchy of innate abilities, a stance evinced in papers such as "Emancipation Black and White" and his most famous paper, "Evolution and Ethics".

In the former, he writes that the "highest places in the hierarchy of civilization will assuredly not be within the reach of our dusky cousins, though it is by no means necessary that they should be restricted to the lowest". (Stepan, p. 79–80).

=== Charles Darwin and race ===
Though Charles Darwin's evolutionary theory was set forth in 1859 upon publication of On the Origin of Species, this work was largely absent of explicit reference to Darwin's theory applied to man. This application by Darwin would not become explicit until 1871 with the publication of his second great book on evolution, The Descent of Man, and Selection in Relation to Sex.

Darwin's publication of this book occurred within the heated debates between advocates of monogeny, who held that all races came from a common ancestor, and advocates of polygeny, who held that the races were separately created. Darwin, who had come from a family with strong abolitionist ties, had experienced and was disturbed by cultures of slavery during his voyage on the Beagle years earlier. Noted Darwin biographers Adrian Desmond and James Moore argue that Darwin's writings on evolution were not only influenced by his abolitionist tendencies, but also his belief that non-white races were equal in regard to their intellectual capacity as white races, a belief which had been strongly disputed by scientists such as Morton, Agassiz and Broca, all noted polygenists.

By the late 1860s, however, Darwin's theory of evolution had been thought to be compatible with the polygenist thesis (Stepan 1982). Darwin thus used Descent of Man to disprove the polygenist thesis and end the debate between polygeny and monogeny once and for all. Darwin also used it to disprove other hypotheses about racial difference that had persisted since the time of ancient Greece, for example, that differences in skin color and body constitution occurred because of differences of geography and climate.

Darwin concluded, for example, that the biological similarities between the different races were "too great" for the polygenist thesis to be plausible. He also used the idea of races to argue for the continuity between humans and animals, noting that it would be highly implausible that man should, by mere accident acquire characteristics shared by many apes.

Darwin sought to demonstrate that the physical characteristics that were being used to define race for centuries (i.e. skin color and facial features) were superficial and had no utility for survival. Because, according to Darwin, any characteristic that did not have survival value could not have been naturally selected, he devised another hypothesis for the development and persistence of these characteristics. The mechanism Darwin developed is known as sexual selection.

Though the idea of sexual selection had appeared in earlier works by Darwin, it was not until the late 1860s when it received full consideration (Stepan 1982). Furthermore, it was not until 1914 that sexual selection received serious consideration as a racial theory by naturalist thinkers.

Darwin defined sexual selection as the "struggle between individuals of one sex, generally the males, for the possession of the other sex". Sexual selection consisted of two types for Darwin: 1.) The physical struggle for a mate, and 2.) The preference for some color or another, typically by females of a given species. Darwin asserted that the differing human races (insofar as race was conceived phenotypically) had arbitrary standards of ideal beauty, and that these standards reflected important physical characteristics sought in mates.

Broadly speaking, Darwin's attitudes of what race was and how it developed in the human species are attributable to two assertions, 1.) That all human beings, regardless of race, share a single, common ancestor, and 2.) Phenotypic racial differences are superficially selected, and have no survival value. Given these two beliefs, some believe Darwin to have established monogenism as the dominant paradigm for racial ancestry, and to have defeated the scientific racism practiced by Morton, Knott, Agassiz et al., as well as notions that there existed a natural racial hierarchy that reflected inborn differences and measures of value between the different human races. Nevertheless, he stated: "The various races, when carefully compared and measured, differ much from each other – as in the texture of hair, the relative proportions of all parts of the body, the capacity of the lungs, the form and capacity of the skull, and even the convolutions of the brain. But it would be an endless task to specify the numerous points of difference. The races differ also in constitution, in acclimatization and in liability to certain diseases. Their mental characteristics are likewise very distinct; chiefly as it would appear in their emotion, but partly in their intellectual faculties." (The Descent of Man, chapter VII).

In The Descent of Man, Darwin noted the great difficulty naturalists had in trying to decide how many "races" there actually were:

Man has been studied more carefully than any other animal, and yet there is the greatest possible diversity amongst capable judges whether he should be classed as a single species or race, or as two (Virey), as three (Jacquinot), as four (Kant), five (Blumenbach), six (Buffon), seven (Hunter), eight (Agassiz), eleven (Pickering), fifteen (Bory St. Vincent), sixteen (Desmoulins), twenty-two (Morton), sixty (Crawfurd), or as sixty-three, according to Burke. This diversity of judgment does not prove that the races ought not to be ranked as species, but it shews that they graduate into each other, and that it is hardly possible to discover clear distinctive characters between them.

== Decline of racial studies after 1930 ==
Several social and political developments that occurred at the end of the 19th century and into the 20th century led to the transformation in the discourse of race. Three movements that historians have considered are: the coming of mass democracy, the age of imperialist expansion, and the impact of Nazism. More than any other, the violence of Nazi rule, the Holocaust, and World War II transformed the whole discussion of race. Nazism made an argument for racial superiority based on a biological basis. This led to the idea that people could be divided into discrete groups and based on the divisions, there would be severe, tortuous, and often fatal consequences. The exposition of Nazi racial theories, which culminated in the Final Solution, created a moral revolution against racism. In 1945, and as a response to the genocide by Nazism, UNESCO was formed. In 1950, it released a statement saying that there was no biological determinant or basis for race.

Consequently, studies of human variation focused more on actual patterns of variation and evolutionary patterns among populations and less about classification. Some scientists point to three discoveries. Firstly, African populations exhibit greater genetic diversity and less linkage disequilibrium because of their long history. Secondly, genetic similarity is directly correlated with geographic proximity. Lastly, some loci reflect selection in response to environmental gradients. Therefore, some argue, human racial groups do not appear to be distinct ethnic groups.

=== Franz Boas ===
Franz Boas (1858–1942) was a German American anthropologist and has been called the "Father of American Anthropology". Professor of anthropology at Columbia University from 1899, Boas made significant contributions within anthropology, more specifically, physical anthropology, linguistics, archaeology, and cultural anthropology. His work put an emphasis on cultural and environmental effects on people to explain their development into adulthood and evaluated them in concert with human biology and evolution. This encouraged academics to break away from static taxonomical classifications of race. It is said that before Boas, anthropology was the study of race, and after Boas, anthropology was the study of culture.

The 20th-century criticism of racial anthropology was significantly based on Boas and his school. Beginning in 1920, he strongly favoured the influence of social environment over heritability. As a reaction to the rise of Nazi Germany and its prominent espousing of racist ideologies in the 1930s, there was an outpouring of popular works by scientists criticizing the use of race to justify the politics of "superiority" and "inferiority". An influential work in this regard was the publication of We Europeans: A Survey of "Racial" Problems by Julian Huxley and A. C. Haddon in 1935, which sought to show that population genetics allowed for only a highly limited definition of race at best. Another popular work during this period, "The Races of Mankind" by Ruth Benedict and Gene Weltfish, argued that though there were some extreme racial differences, they were primarily superficial, and in any case did not justify political action.

=== Julian Huxley and A. C. Haddon ===
Sir Julian Sorell Huxley (1887–1975) was an English evolutionary biologist, humanist, internationalist, and the first director of UNESCO. After returning to England from a tour of the United States in 1924, Huxley wrote a series of articles for the Spectator which he expressed his belief in the drastic differences between "negros" and "whites". He believed that the color of "blood" – percentage of 'white' and 'black' blood – that a person had would determine a person's mental capacity, moral probity, and social behavior. "Blood" also determined how individuals should be treated by society. He was a proponent of racial inequality and segregation.

By 1930, Huxley's ideas on race and inherited intellectual capacity of human groups became more liberal. By the mid-1930s, Huxley was considered one of the leading antiracists and committed much of his time and efforts into publicizing the fight against Nazism.

Alfred Cort Haddon (1855–1940) was a British anthropologist and ethnologist.

In 1935, Huxley and A. C. Haddon wrote, We Europeans, which greatly popularized the struggle against racial science and attacked the Nazis' abuse of science to promote their racial theories. Although they argued that 'any biological arrangement of the types of European man is still largely a subjective process', they proposed that humankind could be divided up into "major" and "minor subspecies". They believed that races were a classification based on hereditary traits but should not by nature be used to condemn or deem inferior to another group. Like most of their peers, they continued to maintain a distinction between the social meaning of race and the scientific study of race. From a scientific standpoint, they were willing to accept that concepts of superiority and inferiority did not exist, but from a social standpoint, they continued to believe that racial differences were significant. For example, they argued that genetic differences between groups were functionally important for certain jobs or tasks.

=== Carleton Coon ===
In 1939, Coon published The Races of Europe, in which he concluded:

1. The Caucasian race is of dual origin consisting of Upper Paleolithic (mixture of Homo sapiens and Neanderthals) types and Mediterranean (purely Homo sapiens) types.
2. The Upper Paleolithic peoples are the truly indigenous peoples of Europe.
3. Mediterraneans invaded Europe in large numbers during the Neolithic period and settled there.
4. The racial situation in Europe today may be explained as a mixture of Upper Paleolithic survivors and Mediterraneans.
5. When reduced Upper Paleolithic survivors and Mediterraneans mix, then occurs the process of dinarization, which produces a hybrid with non-intermediate features.
6. The Caucasian race encompasses the regions of Europe, Central Asia, South Asia, the Near East, North Africa, and the Horn of Africa.
7. The Nordic race is part of the Mediterranean racial stock, being a mixture of Corded and Danubian Mediterraneans.

In 1962, Coon also published The Origin of Races, wherein he offered a definitive statement of the polygenist view. He also argued that human fossils could be assigned a date, a race, and an evolutionary grade. Coon divided humanity into five races and believed that each race had ascended the ladder of human evolution at different rates.

Since Coon followed the traditional methods of physical anthropology, relying on morphological characteristics, and not on the emerging genetics to classify humans, the debate over Origin of Races has been "viewed as the last gasp of an outdated scientific methodology that was soon to be supplanted." In today's anthropology, Coon's theories on races are considered pseudoscientific.

=== Ashley Montagu ===
Montague Francis Ashley Montagu (1905–1999) was a British-American anthropologist. In 1942, he made a strong effort to have the word "race" replaced with "ethnic group" by publishing his book, Man's Most Dangerous Myth: The Fallacy of Race. He was also selected to draft the initial 1950 UNESCO Statement on Race.

Montagu would later publish An Introduction to Physical Anthropology, a comprehensive treatise on human diversity. In doing so, he sought to provide a firmer scientific framework through which to discuss biological variation among populations.

=== UNESCO ===
The United Nations Educational, Scientific and Cultural Organization (UNESCO) was established November 16, 1945, in the wake of The Holocaust. The UNESCO 1945 constitution declared that, "The great and terrible war which now has ended was made possible by the denial of the democratic principles of the dignity, equality and mutual respect of men, and by the propagation, in their place, through ignorance and prejudice, of the doctrine of the inequality of men and races." Between 1950 and 1978 the UNESCO issued five statements on the issue of race.

The first of the UNESCO statements on race was "The Race Question" and was issued on July 18, 1950. The statement included both a rejection of a scientific basis for theories of racial hierarchies and a moral condemnation of racism. Its first statement suggested in particular to "drop the term 'race' altogether and speak of 'ethnic groups'", which proved to be controversial. The 1950 statement was most concerned with dispelling the notion of race as species. It did not reject the idea of a biological basis to racial categories. Instead it defined the concept of race in terms as a population defined by certain anatomical and physiological characteristics as being divergent from other populations; it gives the examples of the Caucasian, Mongoloid and Negroid races. The statements maintain that there are no "pure races" and that biological variability was as great within any race as between races. It argued that there is no scientific basis for believing that there are any innate differences in intellectual, psychological or emotional potential among races.

The statement was drafted by Ashley Montagu and endorsed by some of the leading researchers of the time, in the fields of psychology, biology, cultural anthropology and ethnology. The statement was endorsed by Ernest Beaglehole, Juan Comas, L. A. Costa Pinto, Franklin Frazier, sociologist specialised in race relations studies, Morris Ginsberg, founding chairperson of the British Sociological Association, Humayun Kabir, writer, philosopher and Education Minister of India twice, Claude Lévi-Strauss, one of the founders of ethnology and leading theorist of structural anthropology, and Ashley Montagu, anthropologist and author of The Elephant Man: A Study in Human Dignity, who was the rapporteur.

As a result of a lack of representation of physical anthropologists in the drafting committee the 1950 publication was criticized by biologists and physical anthropologists for confusing the biological and social senses of race and for going beyond the scientific facts, although there was a general agreement about the statement's conclusions.

UNESCO assembled a new committee with better representation of the physical sciences and drafted a new statement released in 1951. The 1951 statement, published as "The Race Concept", focused on race as a biological heuristic that could serve as the basis for evolutionary studies of human populations. It considered the existing races to be the result of such evolutionary processes throughout human history. It also maintained that "equality of opportunity and equality in law in no way depend, as ethical principles, upon the assertion that human beings are in fact equal in endowment."

As the 1950 and 1951 statements generated considerable attention, in 1964 a new commission was formed to draft a third statement titled "Proposals on the Biological Aspects of Race". According to Michael Banton (2008), this statement broke more clearly with the notion of race-as-species than the previous two statements, declaring that almost any genetically differentiated population could be defined as a race. The statement stated that "Different classifications of mankind into major stocks, and of those into more restricted categories (races, which are groups of populations, or single populations) have been proposed on the basis of hereditary physical traits. Nearly all classifications recognise at least three major stocks" and "There is no national, religious, geographic, linguistic or cultural group which constitutes a race ipso facto; the concept of race is purely biological." It concluded with "The biological data given above stand in open contradiction to the tenets of racism. Racist theories can in no way pretend to have any scientific foundation."

The 1950, 1951, and 1964 statements focused on dispelling the scientific foundations for racism but did not consider other factors contributing to racism. For this reason, in 1967 a new committee was assembled, including representatives of the social sciences (sociologists, lawyers, ethnographers and geneticists), to draft a statement "covering the social, ethical and philosophical aspects of the problem". This statement was the first to provide a definition of racism: "antisocial beliefs and acts which are based upon the fallacy that discriminatory intergroup relations are justifiable on biological grounds". The statement continued to denounce the many negative social effects of racism.

In 1978, the general assembly of the UNESCO considered the four previous statements and published a collective "Declaration on Race and Racial Prejudice". This declaration included apartheid as one of the examples of racism, an inclusion which caused South Africa to step out of the assembly. It declared that a number of public policies and laws needed to be implemented. It stated that:

- "All human beings belong to a single species."
  - "All peoples of the world possess equal faculties for attaining the highest level in intellectual, technical, social, economic, cultural and political development."
  - "The differences between the achievements of the different peoples are entirely attributable to geographical, historical, political, economic, social and cultural factors."
  - "Any theory which involves the claim that racial or ethnic groups are inherently superior or inferior, thus implying that some would be entitled to dominate and eliminate others, presumed to be inferior, or which bases value judgements on racial differentiation, has no scientific foundation and is contrary to the moral and ethical principles of humanity."

=== Criticism of racial studies (1930s–1980s) ===
In 1930, Endre Sík (1891–1978), a Hungarian communist intellectual, authored Rasovaja problema i marksizm (The Racial Problem and Marxism), a groundbreaking attempt to formulate a Marxist constructivist theory of race. Published in the USSR, the book predates similar works by Oliver Cox and W. E. B. Du Bois and sought to explain racial categories not as biological facts but as socio-economic constructs shaped by imperialism and capitalist exploitation. Sík distinguished between biological race, the conventional classifications that people impose on the humanity, and “social races,” arguing that racial identities are historically produced through systems of domination and economic exploitation. Sík's views were marginalized within the Communist International, which at the time promoted the “Black Belt” thesis—that African Americans constituted a nation with a right to self-determination. Sík opposed this view, arguing instead for class-based unity and integration.

Claude Lévi-Strauss' Race and History (UNESCO, 1952) was another critique of the biological "race" notion, arguing in favor of cultural relativism. Lévi-Strauss argued that when comparatively ranking cultures, the culture of the person performing the ranking would naturally decide which values and ideas are prioritized. Lévi-Strauss compared this to special relativity, suggesting that each observer's frame of reference, their culture, appeared to them to be stationary, while the others' cultures appeared to be moving only in relation to an outside frame of reference. Lévi-Strauss cautioned against focusing on specific differences, such as which race was first to develop a specific technology in isolation, as he believed this would create a simplistic and warped view of humanity. Lévi-Strauss instead advocated looking at why these developments were made in context, and what problems they addressed.

In his 1984 article in Essence magazine, "On Being 'White' ... and Other Lies", James Baldwin reads the history of racialization in America as both figuratively and literally violent, remarking that race only exists as a social construction within a network of force relations:

"America became white — the people who, as they claim, 'settled' the country became white — because of the necessity of denying the Black presence, and justifying the Black subjugation. No community can be based on such a principle — or, in other words, no community can be established on so genocidal a lie. White men from Norway, for example, where they were Norwegians — became white: by slaughtering the cattle, poisoning the well, torching the houses, massacring Native Americans, raping Black women.... Because they are white, they cannot allow themselves to be tormented by the suspicion that all men are brothers."

=== Refutation by modern genetics ===
The impossibility of drawing clearly defined boundaries between the areas of the supposed racial groups had been observed by Blumenbach and later by Charles Darwin.

With the availability of new data due to the development of modern genetics, the concept of races in a biological sense has become untenable. Problems of the concept include: It "is not useful or necessary in research", scientists are not able to agree on the definition of a certain proposed race, and they do not even agree on the number of races, with some proponents of the concept suggesting 300 or even more "races". Also, data are not reconcilable with the concept of a treelike evolution nor with the concept of "biologically discrete, isolated, or static" populations.

In 2019, the American Association of Physical Anthropologists stated: "The belief in 'races' as natural aspects of human biology, and the structures of inequality (racism) that emerge from such beliefs, are among the most damaging elements in the human experience both today and in the past."

After discussing various criteria used in biology to define subspecies or races, Alan R. Templeton concludes in 2016: "[T]he answer to the question whether races exist in humans is clear and unambiguous: no."

== See also ==
- Biological anthropology – Branch of anthropology that studies the physical development of the human species
- Biological determinism – Research paradigm in behavioural genetics
- Cephalometry – Study and measurement of the head
- Eugenics – Effort to improve purported human genetic quality
- Heritability – Estimation of effect of genetic variation on phenotypic variation of a trait
- History of anthropometry – History of measurements of humans
- Nature versus nurture – Long-standing debate in biology and society
- One-drop rule – Historical racial classification rule
- Phrenology – Pseudoscientific study of human skull shape
- Race and intelligence – Discussions and claims of differences in intelligence along racial lines
- Racial hygiene – Efforts to avoid miscegenation, analogous to an animal breeder seeking purebred animals
- Yakub (Nation of Islam) – Figure in the mythology of the Nation of Islam
