= Black people in ancient Roman history =

History of African people in the Roman Empire

In classical antiquity, Greek and Roman writers were acquainted with people of every skin tone from very pale (associated with populations from Scythia) to very dark (associated with populations from sub-Saharan Africa (Aethiopia). People described with words meaning "black", or as Aethiopes, are occasionally mentioned throughout the Empire in surviving writings, and people with very dark skin tones and tightly-curled hair are depicted in various artistic modes. Other words for people with other skin tones were also used.

According to the historian Frank Snowden, skin tones did not carry any social implications, and no social identity, either imposed or assumed, was associated with skin color. Although the color black was associated with ill-omens in the ancient Roman religion, racism as understood today developed only after the classical period:

The ancients did not fall into the error of biological racism; black skin color was not a sign of inferiority. Greeks and Romans did not establish color as an obstacle to integration in society. An ancient society was one that for all its faults and failures never made color the basis for judging a man.

— Frank Snowden, Jr.

== "Aethiopes" ==
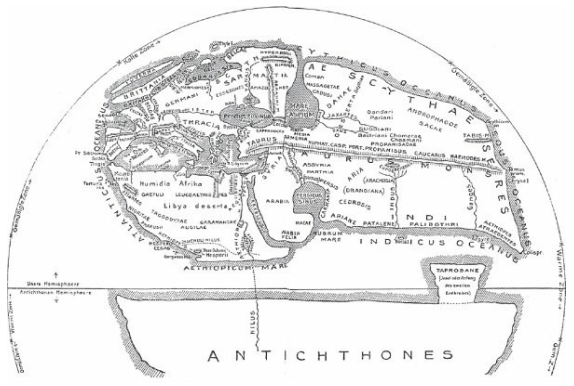
World according to Pomponius Mela, a Roman geographer.

In classical antiquity, terms such as afer, maurus, niger, ater, fuscus, perustus, or melas were commonly used in reference to darker-toned physical characteristics encountered in daily life around the Mediterranean. The term Aethiopes (sing. Aethiops) referred to particularly dark-skinned peoples, first recorded as early as Homer, who presented them as remote, almost legendary figures that inhabited the far reaches of the known world. No ancient writer attempted the detailed human classifications of pseudoscientific racism, and no exact definition of the term Aethiops is recorded. Early contacts with such populations were along the Nile and with the civilization of the kingdoms of Nubia; the mythological stereotype of Aethiopia described its inhabitants as particularly moral.

== Aethiopia ==
The inhabited world according to Herodotus: Libya (Africa) is imagined as extending no further south than the Horn of Africa, terminating in the uninhabitable desert. All peoples inhabiting the southernmost fringes of the inhabitable world are known as Aethiopians (after their dark skin). At the extreme south-east of the continent are the Macrobians, so-called for their longevity.

The earliest surviving mention is in the Odyssey:

"But Poseidon was visiting the Ethiopians (Αἰθίοπας), who live far away. Indeed, the Ethiopians, who are the most far-off of men, are divided in two. Some live where the sun sets, and some dwell where it rises. Poseidon went to accept a hecatomb of bulls and sheep. And while there he enjoys the feast."

— Homer

Extant geographical sources place Aethiopia somewhere within the upper part of the torrid zone in Sahara desert, imagined as engulfed by the Red Sea, and at the end of the world as known to classical antiquity. This territory merges into areas unknown to classical civilization at its edges, and Aethiopiae are at times described as antichthones, semi-mythic figures who lived beyond the edge of the known world.

== Historical status of Ancient Egypt ==
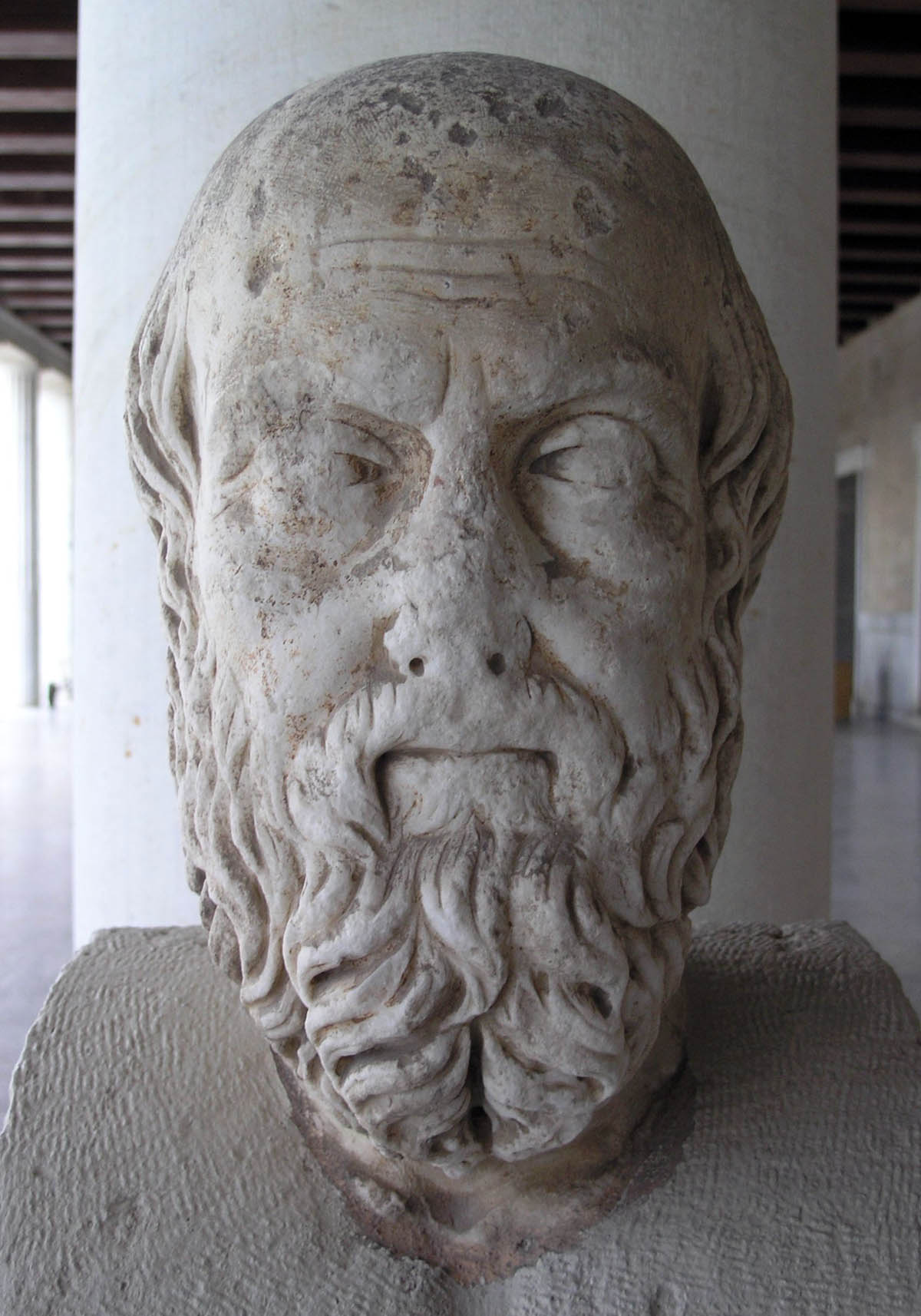
Herodotus, the "father of history", wrote that Egyptians had dark skin and woolly hair.

A range of scholars have cited the classical observations of prominent Greeks and Romans as forms of primary evidence to denote the physical appearance of the early Egyptians. Some historical accounts have drawn close physical and cultural resemblances between Egyptians and Ethiopians whereas others have associated them more closely with northern Indians.

In the fifth century BCE, Greek historian, Herodotus, described the Egyptians as having “melanchrones skin and wooly hair and secondly, and more reliably for the reason that alone among mankind the Egyptians and the Ethiopians have practiced circumcision since time immemorial.” Herodotus also wrote that the Ammonians of Siwa Oasis are "colonists from Egypt and Aethiopia and speak a language compounded of the tongues of both countries".

In the first century BCE, Greek historian Diodorus Siculus, in his work Bibliotheca Historica, reported that the Ethiopians claimed that Egypt was an early colony, and that the Ethiopians also cited evidence that they were more ancient than the Egyptians as he wrote:

"The Ethiopians say that the Egyptians are one of their colonies which was brought into Egypt by Osiris".

Diodorus Siculus also discussed the similar cultural practices between the Ethiopians and Egyptians such as the writing systems as he states "We must now speak about the Ethiopian writing which is called hieroglyphic among the Egyptians, in order that we may omit nothing in our discussion of their antiquities".

Ammianus Marcellinus, (325/330-after 391) served as a Greco-Roman historian in 4th century CE, He described “the men of Egypt are mostly brown and black with a skinny and desiccated look.”

Arrian, Greek historian, wrote in the 1st-century AD that "The appearance of the inhabitants is also not very different in India and Ethiopia: the southern Indians are rather more like Ethiopians as they are black to look on, and their hair is black; only they are not so snub-nosed or woolly-haired as the Ethiopians; the northern Indians are most like the Egyptians physically".

According to a passage sourced from Strabo, Greek geographer, 1st-century AD, northern Indians held similar physical characteristics as the Egyptians: "As for the people of India, those in the south are like the Aethiopians in colour, although they are like the rest in respect to countenance and hair (for on account of the humidity of the air their hair does not curl), whereas those in the north are like the Aegyptians".

Secondary interpretation of these historical descriptions have remained a source of academic contention.

Professor of African Studies at Temple University, Molefi Kete Asante has referenced other examples from Herodotus's primary account for which he interprets to describe the physical appearance of Egyptians as Africans. This has included the following sourced statements "the flooding of the Nile could not be caused by snow, because the natives of the country (Egypt) are black from the heat" and descriptions of an oracle as Egyptian based on Dodoneans "calling the dove black,[which] they indicated that the woman was Egyptian".

However, Professor Yaacov Shavit of Tel Aviv University, argued that "[t]he evidence clearly shows that those Greco-Roman authors who refer to the skin color and other physical traits distinguish sharply between Ethiopians (Nubians) and Egyptians, and rarely do they refer to the Egyptians as black, even though they were described as darker than themselves.... [in addition,] Egyptians and Nubians were both clearly distinguished from the black Africans."

Classical author Frank Snowden argued that terms used by ancient Greek and Roman writers to describe the physical characteristics of other ancient peoples differed from contemporary racial terminology in the West.

Keita and Boyce expressed caution on the use and reliability of primary accounts and instead favoured population biology. Nonetheless, they found these descriptions on the origins of early Egyptians aligned with modern sources of anthropological data (cranial, limb proportion studies) which identified greater similarities between early Egyptians and North-East African populations (Somalia, Nubia and Kushites) that were "Ethiopians" in the Greek traditional sense. In a later chapter, Keita observed that some Greeks reported that Egypt was an Ethiopian colony but distinctions were made between Egyptians and Ethiopians in ancient accounts, but it remained unclear whether these distinctions were made on cultural rather on biological grounds.

=== Academic consensus on the peopling of Egypt ===
"It follows that the Ancient Egyptians were Africans even if immigrants also trickled in from Asia and southern Europe. Where the ancient Egyptians were black or as brown in skin colour as other Africans may remain an issue of emotive dispute; probably they were both".

— British Africanist, Basil Davidson, 1990.

Mainstream scholarship have situated the ethnicity and the origins of predynastic, southern Egypt as a foundational community primarily in northeast Africa which included the Sudan, tropical Africa and the Sahara whilst recognising the population variability that became characteristic of the pharaonic period. Pharaonic Egypt featured a physical gradation across the regional populations, with Upper Egyptians having shared more biological affinities with Sudanese and southernly African populations, whereas Lower Egyptians had closer genetic links with Levantine and Mediterranean populations.

International scholarship reflected in the UNESCO General History of Africa have expressed a similar position. A majority of the scholars that contributed to the Volume II edition (1981) considered Egypt an indigenous African civilisation with a mixed population that originated largely in the Sahara and featured a variety of skin colours from north and south of the Saharan region. In the view of Egyptian scholar and featured editor, Gamal Mokhtar, Upper Egypt and Nubia held "similar ethnic composition" with comparable material culture. An updated volume IX publication launched in 2025, reaffirmed the view that Egypt had African and Eurasian populations. The review section which focused on the 1974 "Peopling of Egypt" symposium stated that accumulated research over the three decades had confirmed the migration from Southernly African along with Saharan populations into the early Nile Valley. Upper Egypt was now positioned as a origin point of Pharaonic unification, with supporting archaeological, anthropological, genetic and linguistic sources of evidence having identified close affinities between Upper Egypt and other Sub-Saharan African populations.

== Identifiable people ==
Aethiopiae were rare in the capital under Nero; it was evidence of a brilliant and costly affair when the gladiators for a whole day's show consisted only of Aethiopes.

One "Aethiop" soldier is reported (by Historia Augusta, a source of mixed reliability) in Britannia in about 210 CE, his black skin being considered a bad omen for North African Emperor Septimius Severus who was born in Leptis Magna.

== Depictions of skin tone ==
A strong distinction in skin color is frequently seen in the portrayal of men and women in Ancient Rome. Since women in Ancient Rome were traditionally expected to stay inside and out of the sun, they were usually quite pale; whereas men were expected to go outside and work in the sun, so they were usually deeply tanned. Separately, people with very dark skin and tightly-curled hair were often depicted in art. Classical pedagogy, intermingled with the fraught legacy of racism, has incorrectly imputed racism to ancient depictions of people with the physical characteristics of sub-Saharan Africans.

== Attitudes towards physical differences between populations ==
Romans and Greeks were generally ethnocentric, priding themselves on their autochthony and viewing themselves as somewhat privileged inhabitants of the optimal environment for human prosperity and advancement. Environmental determinism was the primary lens through which classical elites understood their perceived advantages vis-à-vis the "other", and ubiquitous themes of eastern effeminacy as compared to northern hardiness were ascribed to the consequences of different climatic conditions.

Classical authors have left no record of any social implications of dark or black skin color, but multiple sources of group identity are recorded. Romans clearly perceived physical differences between individuals and populations across time and space, as evidenced by the frequent representation of diverse types in classical iconography. But they never defined these differences in a comprehensive manner, employing a range of terms to describe human social and physical characteristics. For example, terms such as genos, ethnos, ethnê, and phulê can be approximately mapped onto 21st-century notions of race, ethnic grouping, political units, or other sociocultural concepts. A "Roman" identity did not suggest a given skin tone, rather it referred to an ever-shifting set of cultural traditions, growing more eclectic in later Roman history, to which inherited physical characteristics were of no relevance.

== See also ==
- Aethiopia
- Romans in sub-Saharan Africa
- Curse of Ham
- Washing the Ethiopian White
