= Frank M. Snowden Jr. =

American classicist and diplomat (1911–2007)

- Photographed in the 1940s
- Born: Frank Martin Snowden Jr. July 17, 1911; York County, Virginia, U.S.
- Died: February 18, 2007 (aged 95); Washington, D.C., U.S.
- Resting place: Rock Creek Cemetery
- Occupations: Classical scholar Cultural attaché
- Spouse: Elaine Hill Snowden (m. 1935; died 2005)
- Children: Frank Snowden and Jane Alice Snowden Lepscky
- Awards: National Humanities Medal (2003)

Academic background
- Education: Boston Latin School; Harvard University
- Thesis: De Servis Libertisque Pompeianis ("On Slaves and Freedmen in Pompeii") (1944)

Academic work
- Institutions: Virginia State College; Spelman College; Howard University

Frank Martin Snowden Jr. (July 17, 1911 – February 18, 2007), was an American historian and classicist, best known for his study of black people in classical antiquity. He was a Distinguished Professor emeritus of classics at Howard University. He also served as a delegate to UNESCO and as a cultural attaché to the United States embassy in Rome.

== Career ==
Frank Martin Snowden Jr. was born in rural York County, Virginia, on July 17, 1911, to Frank M. Snowden Sr. His father was a colonel in the U.S. Army. He was raised in Boston. He graduated from Boston Latin School and earned undergraduate and doctoral degrees from Harvard University, completing his doctoral degree in 1944. His thesis was titled De Servis Libertisque Pompeianis.

After a brief period teaching at Virginia State College and at Spelman College, Snowden moved to Howard University, where he remained the rest of his career. At Howard, he served as chair of the classics department for many years, and was dean of the College of Liberal Arts from 1956 to 1968.

Snowden retired in 1976. In retirement, he taught at Howard as professor emeritus; he also taught at Vassar College, and Mary Washington College. He was dean of the College of Liberal Arts at Howard University, and was the first honoree in the Howard University Libraries' "Excellence at Howard" program.

Snowden's books include Blacks in Antiquity: Ethiopians in the Greco-Roman Experience (1970), which received the Charles J. Goodwin Award of Merit of the American Philological Association, and Before Color Prejudice: The Ancient View of Blacks (1983). He was also a contributor to The Image of the Black in Western Art I: From the Pharaohs to the Fall of the Roman Empire (1976).

Snowden served as a member of the American delegation to UNESCO in Paris, France. He also served as a cultural attaché to the United States Embassy in Rome, under the Eisenhower administration, and as a specialist lecturer for the U.S. State Department.

== Work ==
Snowden was largely known for his studies of black people in the ancient world. He documented that in ancient Rome and Greece racial prejudice was not an issue. Much of this, according to Snowden, is because most of the Africans encountered in Rome were not slaves. Most of the Africans documented in Rome and Greece met were warriors, statesmen, and mercenaries. Therefore, Africans were not subjected to the racism of modern civilization. He studied ancient art and literature, and he found mass evidence Africans were able to co-exist with the Greeks and Romans of the time.

== Later life and death ==
In 2003, Snowden was honored at the White House as a recipient of the National Humanities Medal. He died of congestive heart failure in Washington, D.C., on February 18, 2007. He was buried in Rock Creek Cemetery.

== Personal life ==
Snowden married Elaine Hill Snowden in 1935, and lived with her in Washington, D.C., until her death in 2005. He was fluent in Latin, Greek, German, French and Italian. His son, Frank M. Snowden III, is a professor of twentieth-century Italian history at Yale University.

== Works ==
- Frank M. Snowden Jr. (1970). Blacks in Antiquity: Ethiopians in the Greco-Roman Experience. Cambridge, Massachusetts: Belknap Press. ISBN 0674076265.
- Frank M. Snowden Jr. (1983). Before Color Prejudice: The Ancient View of Blacks. Cambridge, Massachusetts: Harvard University Press. ISBN 0674063813.
