= Johann Michael Wittmer =

German painter

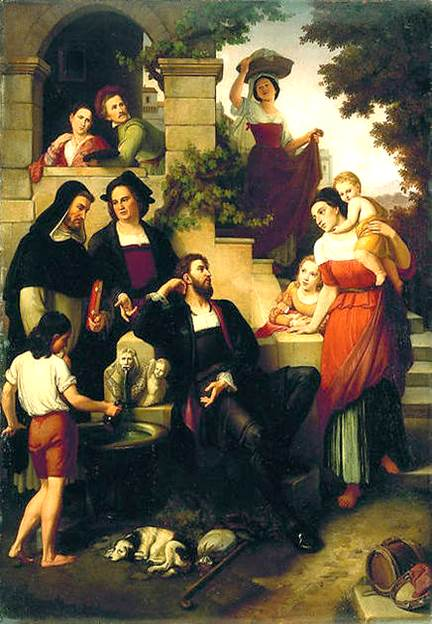
Resting at a Fountain (1866). Wittmer and his wife are the figures under the arch.

Johann Michael Wittmer (15 October 1802 – 9 May 1880) was a German painter who came from a family of painters and sculptors and was associated with the "Deutschrömer" (Germans artists and writers who lived in Rome). He is often referred to as "Johann Michael Wittmer II", to distinguish him from an earlier family member of the same name.

== Life ==
He was born in Murnau am Staffelsee. His father died before his birth and he was raised by a step-father who was apparently not sympathetic to the family profession. In 1820, he used some hard-earned money to attend the Academy of Fine Arts, Munich, where he studied until 1828; first with Johann Peter von Langer, then Peter von Cornelius, who obtained work for him, assisting other artists with their commissions. These jobs enabled him to save enough money to go to Rome, although he had to walk there, by way of Venice and Florence.

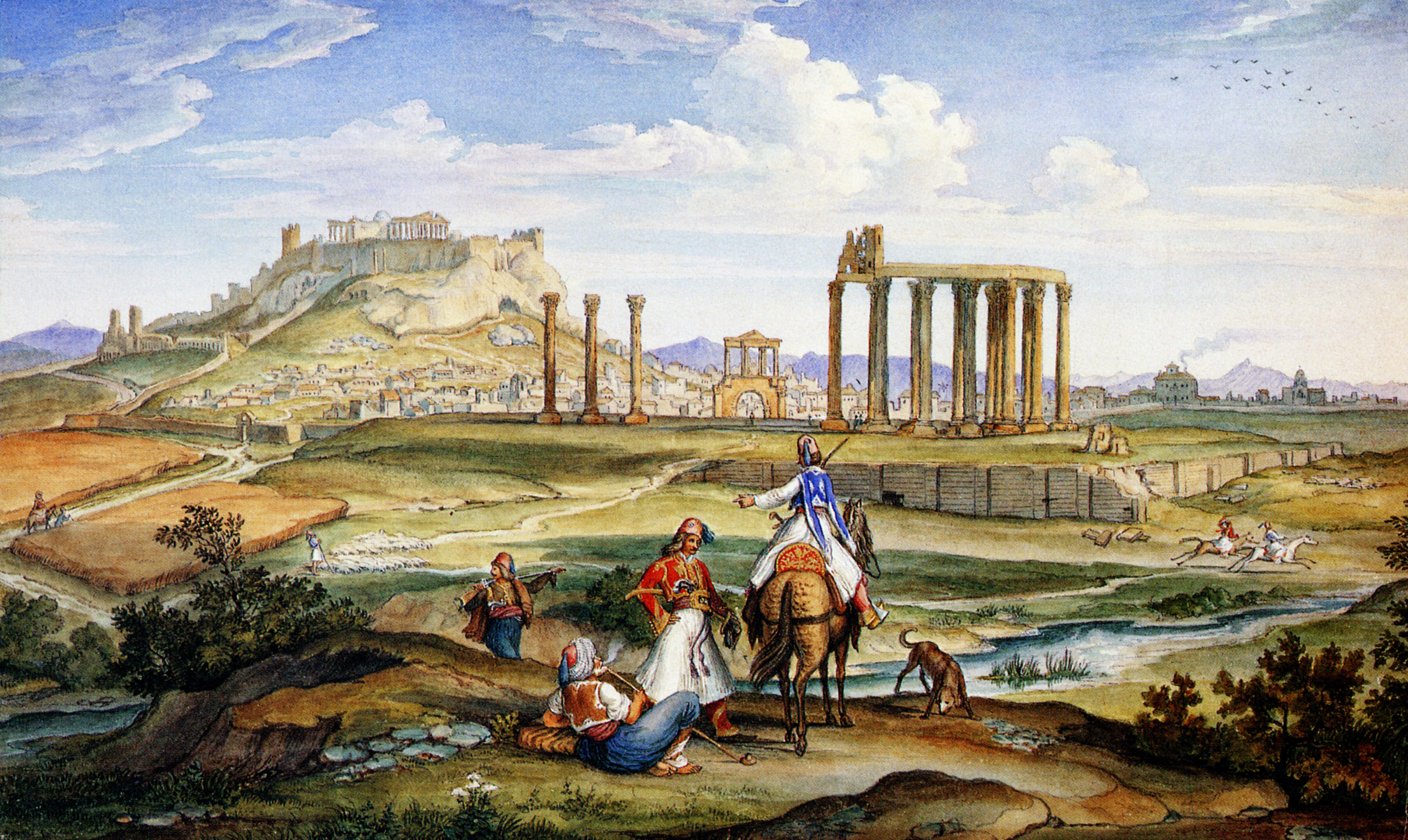
View of Athens from the Ilissos River (1833)

Once there, he joined his fellow Catholic Germans as a member of the Collegio Teutonico. Work was hard to come by, however, and his situation didn't improve until 1832 when, through the mediation of Count Franz Pocci, he was introduced to Crown Prince (later King) Maximilian of Bavaria. One of his first assignments was to accompany the Prince on a trip to Naples and copy the frescoes there. The following year, he accompanied the Prince on a grand tour of the "Orient", visiting and painting numerous historical sites throughout Greece then, following a visit with Maximilian's brother Otto, on to Constantinople (Istanbul) where the Prince's influence enabled them to see parts of the Hagia Sophia that were not open to the public. Upon their return to Italy late in 1833, Wittmer was kept busy completing various projects for the Prince and his family, including a fresco at the Prince's castle in Hohenschwangau.

=== Later career ===
Tragedy struck in 1835 when most of Murnau was destroyed by a fire, leaving his family's extensive collection of paintings and drawings lying in ashes. The year 1839 saw the death of his father-in-law, Joseph Anton Koch, who had been a major influence on his painting style. After that, he became more deeply involved in his work, devoting himself almost entirely to paintings with Christian motifs in the style of the Nazarene movement.

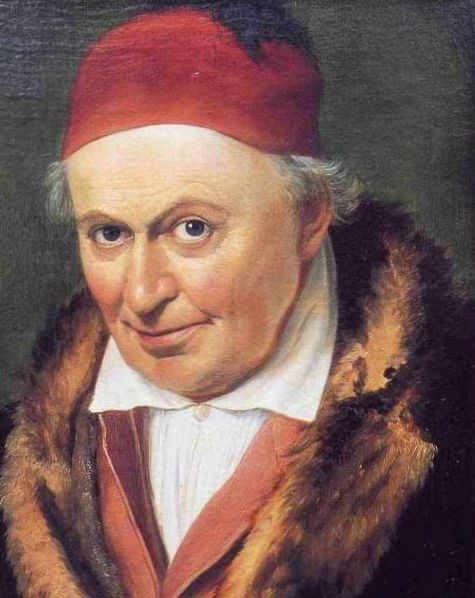
Portrait of Joseph Anton Koch (mid 1830s)

When Maximilian (now the King) returned to Rome, he planned to have Wittmer accompany him on another trip, but it never materialized. The King's patronage continued, however, and Wittmer made trips to Bavaria almost every year after 1857, but turned down the offer of a professorship in Munich, preferring not to make his wife and children relocate.

He became ill during a trip to Munich and died peacefully there shortly after his arrival.
