= Frank Snowden =

- Born: June 22, 1946 (age 80)
- Education: Harvard University; University of Oxford
- Occupations: Historian, author
- Employer: Yale University
- Known for: History of medicine, public health, modern Italy
- Awards: Helen and Howard R. Marraro Prize; Gustav Ranis Prize; Welch Medal

Frank Snowden (born June 22, 1946) is an American historian and author whose work focuses on the history of medicine, public health, and modern Italy. He is the Andrew Downey Orrick Professor Emeritus of History at Yale University. He is the recipient of Helen and Howard R. Marraro Prize of the American Historical Association, the Gustav Ranis Prize of Yale University’s MacMillan Center, and the Welch Medal of the American Association for the History of Medicine.

== Education and career ==
Snowden earned his B.A. in Government from Harvard University in 1968, graduating magna cum laude and earning Phi Beta Kappa honors. He earned B.Phil. in Politics in 1972 and a D.Phil. in Politics in 1975 at Oxford University as a Marshall Scholar and Danforth Fellow.

Snowden began his academic career at Yale University in 1975 before moving to Royal Holloway College, University of London, where he served as Lecturer in History from 1978 to 1990 and Reader in History from 1990 to 1991. He returned to Yale in 1991 as Professor of History and, in 2008, was named the Andrew Downey Orrick Professor of History. Between 2006 and 2018, he also held a joint appointment as Professor of the History of Medicine at the Yale School of Medicine. He retired in 2018 and is now Professor Emeritus at Yale.

== Scholarly works ==
Snowden's research has focused on the history of medicine and public health, particularly the social and political effects of epidemic disease. His early work examined modern Italy, including Violence and Great Estates in the South of Italy: Apulia, 1900–1922 (1984) and The Fascist Revolution in Tuscany, 1919–1922 (1989), which addressed political violence, land conflict, and the development of Fascism in Italy.

He later concentrated on the history of infectious diseases. Naples in the Time of Cholera, 1884–1911 (1995) examined the social and political consequences of cholera in Naples. His The Conquest of Malaria: Italy, 1900–1962 (2006) examined the development of malaria control and eradication in twentieth-century Italy and received awards, including the Helen and Howard R. Marraro Prize of the American Historical Association and the Welch Medal of the American Association for the History of Medicine.

In Epidemics and Society: From the Black Death to the Present (2019), Snowden examined epidemics across different historical periods, emphasizing their broader effects on societies and political institutions. The book received renewed attention during the COVID-19 pandemic.
