= Afrocentricity =

Research method that centers Africans and the African diaspora

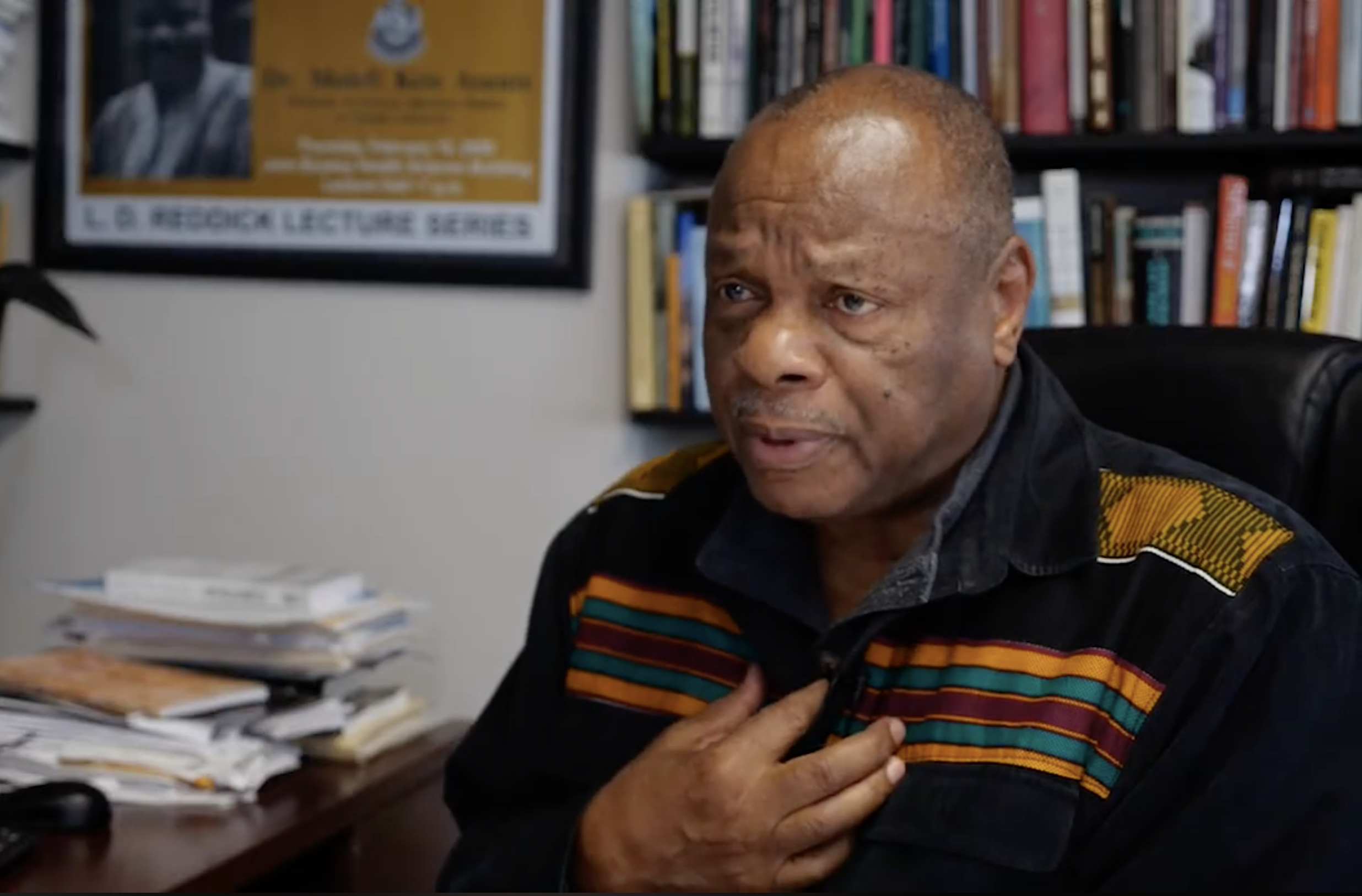
Molefi Kete Asante, author of 1980's Afrocentricity: The Theory of Social Change

Afrocentricity is an academic theory, school of philosophy, and approach to scholarship that seeks to center the experiences and peoples of Africa and the African diaspora within their own historical, cultural, and sociological contexts. First developed as a systematized methodology by Molefi Kete Asante in 1980, he drew inspiration from a number of African and African diaspora intellectuals including Cheikh Anta Diop, George James, Harold Cruse, Ida B. Wells, Langston Hughes, Malcolm X, Marcus Garvey, and W. E. B. Du Bois. The Temple Circle, also known as the Temple School of Thought, Temple Circle of Afrocentricity, or Temple School of Afrocentricity, was an early group of Africologists during the late 1980s and early 1990s beginning at Temple University in Philadelphia that helped to further develop Afrocentricity, which is based on concepts of agency, centeredness, location, and orientation.

== Definition ==
Afrocentricity was coined to evoke "African-centeredness", and, as a unifying paradigm, draws from the foundational scholarship of Africana studies and African studies. Those who identify as specialists in Afrocentricity, including historians, philosophers, and sociologists, call themselves "Africologists" or "Afrocentrists." Africologists seek to ground their work in the perspective and culture common to African peoples, and center African peoples and their experiences as agents and subjects.

Ama Mazama defined the paradigm of Afrocentricity as being composed of the "ontology/epistemology, cosmology, axiology, and aesthetics of African people" and as being "centered in African experiences", which then conveys the "African voice". According to her, Afrocentricity incorporates African dance, music, rituals, legends, literature, and oratures as key features of its expository approach. Axiological features of Afrocentricity that Mazama identifies include explorations of African ethics, and the aesthetic aspects incorporate African mythology, rhythm, and the performing arts. Mazama also argues that Afrocentricity can integrate aspects of African spiritualities as essential components of African worldviews. Mazama sees spirituality and other intuitive methods of acquiring knowledge and emotional responses used in the paradigm as a counterbalance to rationality, and firsthand experience of these cultural and spiritual artifacts can inform Afrocentricity. Mazama indicates that many of the terms and concepts used in Afrocentricity are meant to shift the conceptual status of Africans from being objects that are acted upon to subjects who are agents that act.

In contrast to the hegemonic ideology of Eurocentrism, the paradigm of Afrocentricity is argued by Africologists to be non-hierarchical and pluralistic and not intended to supplant "'white knowledge' with 'black knowledge'". As a holistic multidisciplinary theory with a strong focus on the location and agency of Africans, Afrocentricity is designed not to accept the role of subaltern prescribed to Africans by Eurocentrism. An important aspect of Afrocentricity is therefore a deconstruction and criticism of hegemony, racism, and prejudice.

Africologists, who produce Afrocentric academic works, identify their professional field as Afrocentricity – not Afrocentrism. Crucially, not all academic works that focus on African or African-American topics are necessarily Afrocentric and neither are works on melanist theories nor those rooted in matters of color of the skin, biology, or biological determinism; this means that some claims to Afrocentricity are not strictly part of the paradigm, and certain critiques of supposedly Afrocentric ideas may not be critiques of Afrocentricity per se.

== History ==
Midas Chanawe outlined in his historical survey of the development of Afrocentricity how experiences of the trans-Atlantic slave trade, Middle Passage, and legal prohibition of literacy, shared by enslaved African-Americans, followed by the experience of dual cultures (e.g., Africanisms, Americanisms), resulted in some African-Americans re-exploring their African cultural heritage rather than choosing to be Americanized. Additionally, the African-American experience of ongoing racism emphasized the importance that culture and its relative nature could have on their intellectual enterprise. All of this cultivated a foundation for the development of Afrocentricity. Examples of the kinds of arguments that presaged Afrocentricity include pieces published in the Freedom's Journal (1827) that drew connections between Africans and ancient Egyptians, African-American abolitionists, such as Frederick Douglass and David Walker, who highlighted the accomplishments of the ancient Egyptians as Africans to undermine the white supremacist assertion that Africans were inferior, and the assertions of the Pan-Africanist, Marcus Garvey, who argued that ancient Egypt laid the foundation for civilization in world history. These would be echoed in the contexts of Black Nationalism, Negritude, Pan-Africanism, Black Power movement, and the Black is Beautiful movement that served as harbingers for the formal development of Afrocentricity.

Molefi Kete Asante dates the first use of the term, "Afro-centric", to 1964, when the Institute of African Studies was being established in Ghana and its founder, Kwame Nkrumah, said to the editorial board of the Encyclopedia Africana: "[T]he Africana Project must be frankly Afro-centric in its interpretation of African history, and of the social and cultural institutions of the African and people of African descent everywhere." Other antecedents to Afrocentricity identified by Asante include the 1948 work of Cheikh Anta Diop when he introduced the idea of an "African Renaissance", J.A. Sofala's 1973 treatise The African Culture and Personality, and the three 1973 publications of The Afrocentric Review. Following the example of these and other preceding African intellectuals, Asante formally proposed the concept of Afrocentricity in a 1980 publication, Afrocentricity: The Theory of Social Change, and further refined the concept in The Afrocentric Idea (1987). Other influential publications that helped to develop Afrocentricity include Linda James Myers' Understanding the Afrocentric Worldview (1988), Asante's Kemet, Afrocentricity and Knowledge (1992), Ama Mazama's edited compilation The Afrocentric Paradigm (2003), and Asante's An Afrocentric Manifesto (2007).

Temple University, the institutional home of Molefi Kete Asante and site of the first PhD program in the field of Africana Studies, which at Temple is named Africology and African American Studies, is widely regarded as the leading institution for scholarship in Afrocentricity. In addition to Molefi Kete Asante, Afrocentricity developed among the "Temple Circle" (e.g., Abu Abarry, Kariamu Welsh Asante, Terry Kershaw, Tsehloane Keto, Ama Mazama, Theophile Obenga). As a result of the scholarly development of Afrocentricity, several scholarly journals and professional associations have developed throughout the United States of America and Africa. As a global intellectual enterprise, Afrocentricity is studied, taught, and exemplified at institutions and locations, such as Quilombismo (which was initiated by Abdias Nascimento) in Brazil, the Universitario del Pacifico in Buenaventura, Colombia, the programs of Africamaat in Paris, France, the Centre for African Renaissance at the University of South Africa in South Africa, a training program operated by Stanley Mkhize at the University of Witwatersrand in South Africa, and the Molefi Kete Asante Institute in Philadelphia, Pennsylvania, United States. Africological conferences also developed, some which operate by invitation, and some which occur on a yearly basis, such as the Cheikh Anta Diop Conference. The theory of Afrocentricity also had subsequent impact on other academic fields and theories, such as anthropology, education, jazz theory, linguistics, organizational theory, and physical education.

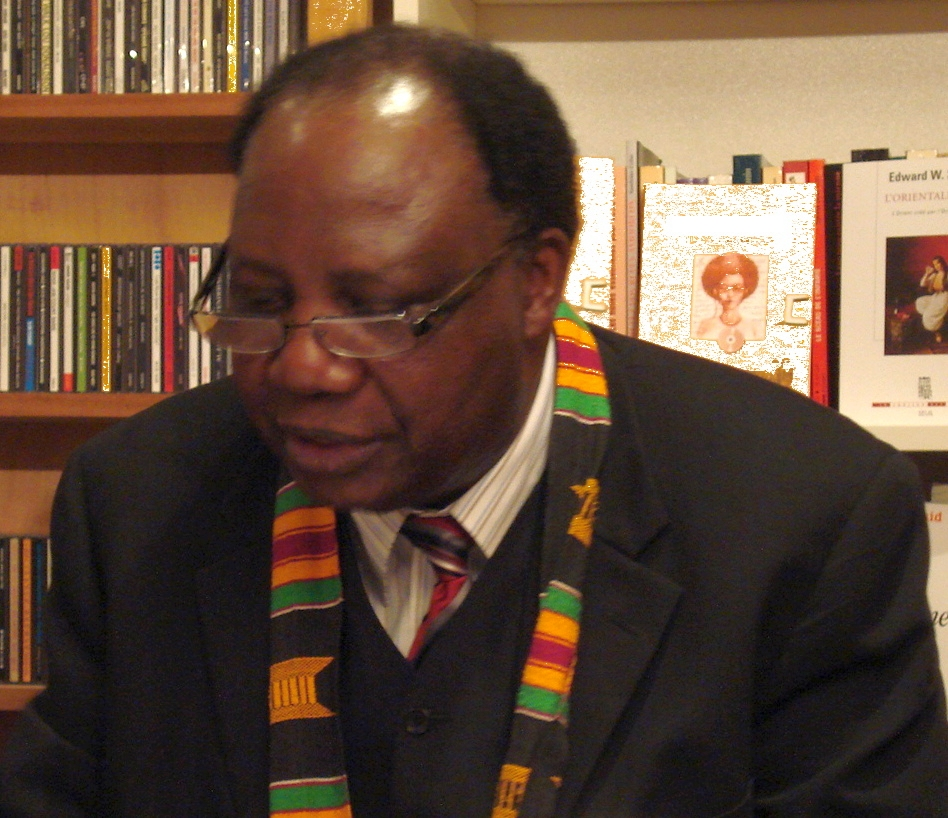
Theophile Obenga, Republic of Congo

== Differences between Afrocentricity and Afrocentrism ==
Afrocentricity and Afrocentrism are not synonymous, but, instead, are distinct from one another, and should not be mistaken for one another. Molefi Kete Asante explains:

By way of distinction, Afrocentricity should not be confused with the variant Afrocentrism. The term "Afrocentrism" was first used by the opponents of Afrocentricity who in their zeal saw it as an obverse of Eurocentrism. The adjective "Afrocentric" in the academic literature always referred to "Afrocentricity." However, the use of "Afrocentrism" reflected a negation of the idea of Afrocentricity as a positive and progressive paradigm. The aim was to assign religious signification to the idea of African centeredness. However, it has come to refer to a broad cultural movement of the late twentieth century that has a set of philosophical, political, and artistic ideas which provides the basis for the musical, sartorial, and aesthetic dimensions of the African personality. On the other hand, Afrocentricity, as I have previously defined it, is a theory of agency, that is, the idea that African people must be viewed and view themselves as agents rather than spectators to historical revolution and change. To this end Afrocentricity seeks to examine every aspect of the subject place of Africans in historical, literary, architectural, ethical, philosophical, economic, and political life.

In addition to Molefi Kete Asante, many other academics have explained that Afrocentricity and Afrocentrism are distinct from one another, and that critics have often conflated the two when criticizing Afrocentricity. Further, Asante indicates that by conflating Afrocentricity with Afrocentricism, critics of Afrocentrism have mischaracterized Afrocentricity as being a "'religious' movement based on an essentialist paradigm." Other academics have also been critical of the criticism of Afrocentricity that seek to define it as a religious movement. Historian and medical anthropologist Katherine Bankole-Medina notes that rather than seeking to understand the theory of Afrocentricity or engage in constructive discourse with the scholars of the theory, many critical academics seek to critique and discredit the theory as well as engage in intellectual militarism. Consequently, between Afrocentrism and Afrocentricity, many critical academics tend to overlook their key suffix distinction (i.e., -ism and -icity). Philosopher Ramose indicated that, in contrast to Afrocentricity, Afrocentrism has been characterized as a notion that negates the notion of Afrocentricity being a "positive and progressive paradigm."

Other academics have indicated that since Afrocentricity has been made increasingly well-known inside and outside of academia, it has resulted in non-academics developing their own forms of analysis that are not so precise or accurate and these subsequently developed forms of analysis have been incorporated into various forms of media (e.g., music, film). This form of popular culture, or Afrocentrism, has also subsequently been mistaken for the systematic methodology of Afrocentricity. As a result of the popular misconceptions of what Afrocentricity is not, Stewart indicates that this has had a negative impact in terms of public perception. Some academics have stated that, while Afrocentrism is popular culture, Afrocentricity is an academic theory and that Afrocentricity has been depicted by mass media and critics as Afrocentrism in order to attempt to mischaracterize and/or invalidate Afrocentricity. Karenga indicated that distinctions exist between the public understanding of Afrocentrism that has been conveyed through mass media, which is held by some proponents and held by some critics of Afrocentrism, and the academic conceptualization of Afrocentricity held by Africologists. Karenga indicates that Afrocentricity is an intellectual paradigm or methodology, whereas, Afrocentrism, by merit of the term's suffix (i.e., -ism), is an ideological and political disposition. Additionally, Karenga indicates that, in Afrocentricity, African behaviors and African culture are subject to examination through the centered lens of African ideals. M'Baye indicates that, unlike Afrocentrism, the intellectual theory of Afrocentricity adds value to the field of Black studies.

Some academics have stated that some of the more radical views of Afrocentricism have been unfairly attributed to Kete Asante.

Some academics have indicated that Afrocentricity is distinct from Afrocentrism, and that Afrocentrism is frequently confused with ethnonationalism, often simplified to black pride or romanticized black history, often misconstrued by progressive/liberal academics as being a black version of white nationalism, or mischaracterized as being a black version of Eurocentrism. They further state, that Afrocentrism has been fallaciously characterized as being a notion based on black supremacy and as being the black equivalent of hegemonic Eurocentrism. Rasekoala states that, while Afrocentrism has been characterized as an ideology focused on cultural traits (e.g., customs, habits, traditions, values, value systems) of Africans, Afrocentricity is a methodology that focuses on the positionality, agency, and experiences of Africans.

Proponents of Afrocentricity state that it is a theoretic concept of agency. They further state that the detractors of Afrocentricity intentionally mislabel Afrocentricity as Afrocentrism in order to steer people of African descent, who are not yet aware of what composes Afrocentricity, away from it. This has been characterized as an "ongoing ideological warfare to ensure the continuation of the subjugation of African people as objects of analysis, thus discouraging them from being agents in their own history." Additionally, it has been further indicated that those who charge scholars of Afrocentricity of producing political propaganda, do so as well, while portraying it as scholarship, in order to deny the agency of Africans and to avoid critique. Hilliard and Alkebulan indicate that, rather than the academic work of scholars of Afrocentricity being used to define Afrocentricity, mass media has shaped the public understanding of Afrocentricity using the work of journalists and the work of academics, who are not professionals in the field of Afrocentricity – such as Mary Lefkowitz and her work, Not Out of Africa, which also confuses Afrocentrism with Afrocentricity – as authoritative sources for criticisms of Afrocentricity. Cultural critic and postcolonial studies professor Edward Said has also been criticized of confusing Afrocentricity with Afrocentricism.

In 1991, the New York Times, or Newsweek, created the term Afrocentrism in opposition to Afrocentricity and critics of Afrocentricity advanced this effort. Zulu indicates that Afrocentrism was an imposed term, which was part of a deceptive grand narrative, intended to derail and curtail the momentum of the paradigm of Afrocentricity being adopted and used.

Asante indicates that Afrocentrism post-dates Afrocentricity as a concept. Other scholars indicate that what has come to be known as Afrocentrism has existed among black communities for centuries as a grassroots political understanding and narrative tradition about the history of Africa and Africans, which lies in contrast to and is distinct from the theory of Afrocentricity and Africology movement that developed in the 1980s. Additionally, use of the term Afrocentric preexisted the birth of Kete Asante and it later became incorporated into the Afrocentric methodology and paradigm created by Asante. As Kete Asante further notes, while African-centeredness may suggest a limitation in geography, Afrocentricity can be performed anywhere in the world as a form of academic study.

While there are different designations (e.g., Africanity, Gloriana Afrocentricity, Proletarian Afrocentricity) for Afrocentricity, Amo‑Agyemang indicates that Afrocentricity should not be mistaken for Afrocentrism and does not seek to replace Eurocentrism. As Afrocentricity centers African identity, and privileges the concepts, traditions, and history of Africans, Amo‑Agyemang indicates that Afrocentricity clarifies, deconstructs, and undermines hegemonic epistemologies; also, that it serves as a liberatory method that "negates/repudiates exploitations, oppression, repression, domination and marginality of indigenous cultural knowledge" and seeks the "democratisation of knowledge, de‑hegemonisation of knowledge, de‑westernisation of knowledge, and de‑Europeanisation of knowledge".

== Criticisms and responses to criticisms ==
Major critics of Afrocentricity have been Tunde Adeleke (e.g., The Case Against Afrocentrism, 2009), Clarence Walker (e.g., Why We Can't Go Home Again, 2001), Stephen Howe (e.g., Afrocentrism: Mythical Pasts and Imagined Homes, 1998), and Mary Lefkowitz (e.g., Not Out of Africa, 1997). These major critical works were characterized in Asante (2017) as being a "misunderstanding of Afrocentricity or an attempt to relaunch the Eurocentric domination in knowledge, criticism, and literature."

Esonwanne (1992) critiqued Asante's Kemet, Afrocentricity and Knowledge (1990) and characterized its discourse as "implausible", its argumentation as "disorganized", its analysis as "crude and garbled", its perceived lack of seriousness in study as harmful to the "serious study of African American and African cultures", as being part of a "whole project of Afrocentrism", and as being "off-handedly racist". Esonwanne (1992) indicates that the redeeming quality and "intellectual value" of Asante's earlier work is its "negative value" and that it is a prime example of what researchers in African studies and African-American studies "would do well to avoid". Esonwanne (1992) further characterizes Asante's Afrocentricity as being a "post-Civil Rights individualist version of the pan-Africanist doctrine" that merits not giving into "temptation to dismiss the notion of Afrocentricity completely in abeyance".

Asante (1993) critiqued Esonwanne (1992) and the critical review that was given to his earlier work. Asante indicated that scholars who considered using Esonwanne (1992) as a means to comprehend his earlier work would have a limited comprehension of his earlier work. Esonwanne's characterization of Asante's work as "off-handedly racist" was characterized by Asante as "gratuitous mudslinging" that lacked specificity about what was being characterized as "off-handedly racist". Additionally, Asante indicated that, due to the lack of specific example cited from his earlier work to support the characterization of it as "off-handedly racist", it was "not only a serious breach of professionalism but a grotesque and dishonest intellectual ploy".

Esonwanne (1992) indicated that grouping Cheikh Anta Diop, Maulana Karenga, and Wade Nobles together was a "strange mix" due to each of the scholars having different methodological approaches to African studies and African-American studies. Based on this characterization of Asante's earlier work as a "strange mix", Asante (1993) viewed this as indication of Esonwanne (1992) showing a lack of comprehension and familiarity with his earlier work, with the works of Diop, Karenga, and Wade, as well as the theory of Afrocentricity. Asante (1993) went on to clarify that Cheikh Anta Diop, Maulana Karenga, and Wade Nobles, despite differences in professional backgrounds or academic interests, were all scholars in the theory of Afrocentricity.

Asante (1993) went on to clarify that, similar to the use of the term "European", the use of the composite term "African" is not used it in reference to an abstraction, but is used in reference to ethnic identity and cultural heritage; as such, there are modal uses of terms such as "African civilization" and "African culture", which do not deny the significance of the discrete identities and heritages of more specific African groupings (e.g., African-American, Hausa, Jamaican, Kikuyu, Kongo, Yoruba). Asante (1993) indicates that usage of such terms, in reference to Ma'at, was addressed in a chapter of his earlier work, but that the shortcomings of the critiques presented in Esonwanne (1992) show that Esonwanne may not have read as far as that chapter.

Hill-Collins (2006) characterized Afrocentrism as essentially being a civil religion (e.g., common beliefs and values; common tenets that distinguish believers from non-believers; views on the unknowns of life, on suffering, and on death; common places of gathering and rituals that establish one as a member of an institutionalized belief system). Some aspects that she defined and related to Asante's Afrocentricity was a fundamental love for black people and blackness (e.g., negritude) and common black values (e.g., Karenga's established values and principles of Kwanzaa); another aspect was black centeredness as a form of grace or relief from white racism; another aspect was the "original sin" of the Trans-Atlantic slave trade as the major reasoning for the suffering and death of black people, Africa as the promised land, and a form of salvation through self-redefinition and self-reclamation as an African people as well as rejection of what is perceived as being of white people and white culture (which are viewed as bearing evil qualities in relation to black people). Another aspect of the characterization of Afrocentrism as a civil religion involves the homophobic and sexist exclusion of black GLBTQ individuals, black women, biracial and multiracial individuals, and wealthy black individuals.

Asante (2007) characterized Hill-Collins (2006) as following a similar approach as Stephen Howe and Mary Lefkowitz of not providing a clear definition for the concept of Afrocentricity that they are attempting to critique and then, subsequently, negatively and incorrectly characterizing Afrocentricity as Afrocentrism (i.e., a black form of Eurocentrism). Asante indicates that Afrocentricity is not an enclosed system of thought or religious belief; rather, he indicated that it is an unenclosed, critical dialectic that allows for open-ended dialogue and debate on the fundamental assumptions that the theory of Afrocentricity is based on. Asante further critiqued and characterized Hill-Collins (2006) as being "not only poor scholarship", but a "form of self-hatred" that is typically "engaged in by vulgar careerists whose plan is to distance themselves from African agency". Asante highlighted Hill-Collins' intellectual work on the centeredness of women of the African diaspora to contrast with her characterized lack of understanding of the intellectual work on the centeredness of African people that Afrocentricity focuses on. As a follow-up to Hill-Collins' Black Power to Hip Hop: Racism, Nationalism, and Feminism?, she authored Ethnicity, Culture, and Black Nationalist Politics, which Asante characterizes as having vaguely defined notions of black nationalism, Afrocentrism/Afrocentricity, civil religion, and African-American ethnic identity. Asante characterized her critiques of Afrocentricity as being supportive of a manufactured intellectual agenda and predicated on the reactionary politics surrounding modern American history.

Asante (2007) highlights that Hill-Collins' perspective on black nationalism, rather than being distinct from usual approaches, derives from the same origin as these approaches (e.g., black feminist nationalism, cultural nationalism, religious nationalism, revolutionary nationalism). Within the context of racialized American national identity, Asante characterizes Hill-Collins' notion of civil religion as the reverence for American civil government and its political principles; along with this notion is the characterized view of immigrating Afro-Caribbeans choosing how to not become "black" Americans (who later join with African-Americans and partake in the UNIA movement), immigrating Europeans choosing how to become "white" Americans, the European-American social power of whiteness to erase their racial identity and become any other identity (e.g., Native American, of Irish descent, of Italian descent) except an identity of African descent, the European-American social power to operate as individuals rather than as a monolithic racial identity (e.g., Black American), and a tradition of racism operating in the modern context of color-blindness, desegregation, and the illusion of equality.

Following her characterized view of black nationalism, Asante (2007) indicates that Hill-Collins conflates black nationalism (e.g., Louis Farrakhan and the Nation of Islam) with Afrocentricity (e.g., Molefi Kete Asante and Afrocentricity). Asante indicates that black nationalism, as a political ideology, is distinct from Afrocentricity, which is a philosophical paradigm, and that both serve distinct purposes and operate in distinct spheres. Rather than being a reformulation of black cultural nationalism and being a civil religion, Asante indicates that Black studies derived and developed from black nationalism and that the development of Afrocentricity post-dates the development of Black studies. Asante indicates that the correct understanding that Hill-Collins has is that "Afrocentricity is a social theory in the sense that it explains the dislocation, disorientation, and mental enslavement of African people as being a function of white racial hegemony." In relation to this view, Asante indicates that mutilating one's own people is one of the greatest forms of dislocation and that revering the instruction of a "slave master" to intellectually attacking one's own people is a form of dislocated behavior.

The centerpiece of Hill-Collins' approach, as Asante (2007) characterized it, is that "Afrocentricity took the framework of American civil religion and stripped it of its American symbols and substituted a black value system." Asante indicates that the earliest Africologists (e.g., Nah Dove, Tsehloane Keto, Ama Mazama, Kariamu Welsh, Terry Kershaw) of the "Temple Circle" or contemporaneous scholars (e.g., Maulana Karenga, Wade Nobles, Asa Hilliard, Clenora Hudson-Weems, Linda Myers) had no conscious intention of creating a civil religion as Hill-Collins claims.

== List of Africologists ==
=== Temple Circle ===
- Abu Abarry
- Kariamu Welsh Asante
- Molefi Kete Asante
- Aisha Blackshire-Belay
- Nah Dove
- Charles Fuller
- Terry Kershaw
- C. Tsehloane Keto
- Ama Mazama
- Theophile Obenga
- James Ravell
- Thelma Ravell
