= Illusion of inclusion =

Sociological concept

The illusion of inclusion has been defined as the "sometimes subtle ways that the standards can appear to adequately address race while at the same time marginalizing it."

Helen Turnbull introduced the concept of the illusion of inclusion in the context of diversity and inclusion. Using the analogy of baking a cake, she characterized diversity as "the mix" and inclusion as "the effort that it takes to make the mix work." She concluded that "having a diverse workforce does not guarantee that you understand how to make that mix work or how to unlock its full potential." Turnbull further highlighted the related concepts of dominant culture and subculture, as well as the dynamics of dominance and privilege in relation to subordinance and assimilation. She emphasized that this dynamic is not solely a matter of individual self-perception but is also influenced by the conscious or unconscious perceptions, assumptions, and labels ascribed to individuals by others, which affect the quality of their relationships.

Turnbull also identified affinity bias as a contributing factor, particularly in corporate hiring practices. Although affinity bias is not exclusive to dominant cultures (such as the culture of white men), it often manifests in dominant cultures when interviewers show a preference for candidates similar to themselves—candidates who make them feel "comfortable." Consequently, interviewers may exhibit an unconscious unconscious bias against candidates who are dissimilar, making them feel "uncomfortable."

In addition, Turnbull discussed the concept of assimilation, which she defined as the "need to adjust our style to fit within the dominant organizational and/or cultural norms." She identified three subcomponents of assimilation:

- Feedback: Feedback that reflects affinity bias, group stereotypes reinforced by confirmation bias, or feedback that ignores positives and presents "development opportunities" through the lens of one's own culture, race, or gender.
- Distancing: Distancing oneself from one's own social identity group to conform to dominant norms.
- Collusion: Adjusting one's style to ensure political safety and maintain the comfort of members of the dominant culture.

Turnbull further emphasized that unconscious and conscious messages, measures, and images of the dominant culture can negatively impact individuals, leading to assimilation. With the internalization of these messages, individuals may collude with the dominant culture, thereby engaging in self-sabotage.

== Race and ethnicity ==
=== African-Americans ===
Many European-Americans believe that racism has ended and that the United States is now a color-blind society. While living in racial isolation—such as in suburbs, gated communities, public or private schools, religious services, and close associations primarily or exclusively with other whites—European-Americans often enjoy abundant work opportunities, upward mobility through quality schooling, appreciating property values, and a general lack of concern about crime. This version of America is then projected onto the rest of the country. Their interactions with non-European Americans are often limited to media representations, where racial minorities are depicted through a narrow range of stereotypes (e.g., criminals, athletes, or success stories). Furthermore, the presence of racial minorities in advertisements and token roles in public and private positions reinforces the perception that racism has ended.

The illegality of racial discrimination in employment, housing, and public accommodations leads to the belief that social and economic disparities between racial groups are attributable to factors other than racism or discrimination. Combined with the ideology of neoliberalism—which suggests that free markets have eliminated the irrationality of racism—this color-blind perspective allows European-Americans to view racial inequalities as consequences of cultural deficiencies within minority communities. By ignoring historical and present-day racist practices that produce and perpetuate equality, European-Americans may conclude that African-Americans and other minorities create their own disadvantages.

The foundational belief in the United States as a meritocracy, coupled with the presumed neutrality of neoliberal market forces and the color-blind assumption of racial equality, forms the basis of the racial and color-blind logic that perpetuates the illusion of inclusion among European-Americans.

Millions of enslaved Africans were stripped of their humanity, identity, culture, history, language, and religion. While freedom is considered a divine gift, it was not granted to enslaved Africans in the United States but had to be fought for and earned through the success of the American Civil War in 1865. Since the 1960s, following the civil rights movement and the colonization of Africa, Africans and African-Americans have lived in a state of survival, striving to restore the identities lost through enslavement.

During the 1950s and 1960s, African-Americans faced numerous challenges, including poverty, police brutality, unjust laws, grief over the killing of family members, and fear of further violence. The Voting Rights Act of 1965 empowered the federal government to enforce the 15th Amendment (granting black men the legal right to vote) and the 19th Amendment (granting women, including black women, the right to vote) in response to various voting obstacles faced by African-Americans, such as poll taxes, identification laws, literacy tests, and threats of violence. Despite legal advancements, African-Americans have historically been aware that the challenges they faced under enslavement and Jim Crow segregation persisted in varied forms, albeit without the illusion of inclusion.

In 2013, the U.S. Supreme Court overturned significant provisions of the Voting Rights Act, allowing states to alter voting laws without federal oversight. This decision enabled southern states, previously monitored by the federal government, to change voting boundaries and implement voter identification laws that disproportionately affected African-Americans. In 2015, the Republican-led U.S. Congress declined to support legislation proposed by President Obama to restore the Voting Rights Act. Emphasizing the importance of voting, activists argued that control of the U.S. presidency and Congress not only impacts national policies but also influences international relations.

In Hidden Colors III: The Rules of Racism, a documentary exploring race and inclusion in the United States, several "Rules of Racism" were articulated:

- Conceal what racism truly is.
- Minimize the contributions of African-Americans.
- Acknowledge that black women and children are not exceptions to the effects of white supremacy.
- Use compromised black individuals to preserve white supremacy.
- Maintain mass control over African-Americans.
- Diminish the significance of slavery and Jim Crow segregation.
- Implement policies that prevent African-Americans from achieving economic competitiveness.

In response, Monroe Community College’s Diversity Council drafted countermeasures:

- Educate others about the true nature of racism.
- Publicize the contributions of African-Americans.
- Oppose institutional racism and white supremacy.
- Modify societal outcomes for African-Americans.
- Highlight the importance and effects of slavery and Jim Crow segregation.
- Challenge policies that perpetuate economic inequality.

The illusion of inclusion was also discussed in the context of Barack Obama's presidency. Critics questioned how an educated African-American could believe that a black president could bring meaningful change to a society historically opposed to black progress. Race remained a determining factor, as evidenced by a survey conducted by sociology professor Richard Schuman, which found that white Americans considered integration to mean 15% black and 85% white, always under white authority. Schuman further noted that “when white Americans say they favor integrated schools or neighborhoods, they really mean a few black families in a predominantly white environment.” The conclusion was that meaningful change in a white supremacist society cannot be achieved by an individual but requires a collective effort that is “united, alert, focused, determined, and knowledgeable.”

The inclusion of African-Americans in mainstream American life has been characterized as mythical. African-Americans have been cautioned against confusing symbolic power with actual power and are urged to confront the illusion of inclusion.

Umar Johnson highlighted the growing awareness among African-American youth, who increasingly recognize the ineffectiveness of conventional prescriptions, such as relying on the political process to address systemic issues like police brutality. He emphasized that civil disobedience, historically instrumental in securing civil rights, remains relevant. Johnson expressed frustration over the black community’s continued support for other marginalized groups while neglecting their own causes. He concluded that, as other demographic groups fight for their interests, African-Americans must similarly prioritize their own struggles.

Minister Louis Farrakhan criticized African-American professionals for being engrossed in the illusion of inclusion, comparing their situation to house slaves who were more comfortable than field slaves and more likely to preserve the status quo. Farrakhan argued that during the 1960s and 1970s, African-American leadership sought civil rights, as opposed to sovereign rights—akin to prisoners seeking decorations for their cells instead of liberation. Consequently, African-Americans, despite the perceived decline of their collective status, have remained conceptually imprisoned by their comfortable captivity. He advocated for breaking free from this mental bondage through exposure to the works of African-centered intellectuals such as Carter G. Woodson, Marcus Garvey, Cheikh Anta Diop, Yosef Ben-Jochannan, Elijah Muhammad, Malcolm X, John Henrik Clarke, Molefi Asante, Maulana Karenga, Amos Wilson, Kwame Akoto, Marimba Ani, Mwalimu Shujaa, Asa Hilliard, Na’im Akbar, Ama Mazama, Chancellor Williams, Karimu Welsh Asante, Frances Cress Welsing, Phil Valentine, Llaila Afrika, Chinweizu, among others.

The KIPP: STAR College Preparatory Charter’s eighth-grade U.S. history curriculum was criticized for presenting a one-sided narrative that perpetuated the illusion of inclusion, particularly in its portrayal of Abraham Lincoln as a savior of the Union while excluding the reality that Lincoln’s primary goal was to preserve the Union, even at the cost of preserving slavery.

Similarly, the presumption that increasing the number of African-Americans earning science and engineering degrees would automatically increase their representation on university faculties was characterized as another manifestation of the illusion of inclusion.

The Council on Social Work Education’s standards were criticized for their perceived impotence and vagueness, reflecting a pattern of diversity by numbers that prioritized superficial representation in faculty, staff, student bodies, and curricula. Despite desegregating institutions, a reluctance to prioritize equitable treatment and diversity perpetuated the illusion of inclusion. An African-centered approach was proposed to address this persistent challenge.

=== Hispanic and Latino Americans ===
In The Illusion of Inclusion: The Untold Political Story of San Antonio, Rodolfo Rosales explores the concept of the illusion of inclusion. Following World War II, as municipal reforms took place in Sunbelt cities such as San Antonio, and by the early 1980s, with the adoption of council-district systems in many of these cities, there was an apparent increase in minority political representation. The Chicano community, particularly its middle class, which was the most active in urban politics and well-positioned to effect change, had successfully gained a significant foothold in politics, creating the perception that inclusion had been achieved. However, Rosales argues that the existing political system merely adapted to accommodate the Chicano community, co-opting its leadership while leaving its working-class and poor members socially and economically marginalized.

Effecting meaningful change within a pro-business, urban political environment rooted in the Sunbelt city model has proven difficult. The shift to council-district systems weakened political parties and community-based organizations while strengthening individual politicians. This shift transformed politics from being organizational agenda-based to being driven by personal agendas. Since organizational agendas can mobilize communities by addressing their direct concerns, they are more likely to promote community-oriented issues that serve the interests of groups such as the Chicano community. In contrast, personal agendas, even when coincidentally aligned with community interests, often fail to generate the same level of advocacy, allowing dominant political and economic priorities—typically those of Anglo businesses—to prevail.

In California, 65% of the population is of Mexican ancestry, while Anglos make up 20% of the population. Despite these demographics, cities like National City, which have large Chicano populations, remain dominated politically and economically by Anglo minorities. This lack of representation for the Chicano majority reflects an enduring illusion of inclusion, if not a regression to the realities of the 1960s. The Raza Unida Party was proposed as a response to address this illusion of inclusion and promote genuine political representation for the Chicano community.

The challenges faced by Chicano/a studies programs are not due to myths such as low enrollment but stem from the monopolization of university structures by white faculty, who control the distribution of institutional resources and benefits. Despite Mexican-American students comprising a significant proportion of the student population—estimated at half of the total enrollment, with approximately 12,000 Latino students—they remain disproportionately underrepresented among tenure-track faculty. Moreover, there are limited course offerings that focus on the Mexican-American experience, a disparity that Chicano/a studies programs seek to address.

In Los Angeles, the Latino population has grown to over 50%, with 80% of that population being of Mexican ancestry. Despite this demographic shift, racial disparities persist between Mexican-American students and faculty. When a Mexican American professor highlighted these disparities, their concerns were met with negative responses from white faculty, including discomfort with discussing race, objections to hiring "unqualified" applicants, assertions of "not seeing color," and claims that race is irrelevant. However, studies demonstrate that the race and class backgrounds of professors significantly influence the types of questions posed by students and the outcomes of their research.

The illusion of inclusion is further underscored by statistics on Hispanic participation in the United States, which reveal that the American social system marginalizes and excludes Hispanics rather than genuinely integrating them. Despite superficial indicators of progress, structural inequalities continue to perpetuate the exclusion of Hispanic and Latino Americans from meaningful representation and full inclusion in American society.

=== Additional examples ===
Demographic data has often been used to justify inclusion. However, the exclusion of Black and Latino communities historically led to the adoption of inclusion as a guiding principle during the civil rights movement. Since the 1960s, diversity has been associated with increasing access and representation, making it a central consideration in institutional settings. At California State University, Northridge, the institution's one-size-fits-all model was characterized as producing an illusion of inclusion due to a perceived lack of substantive change in terms of power and influence.

The 2008 U.S. presidential election presented a rare opportunity to examine issues related to race, class, and gender. However, rather than critically analyzing the complex matrix of identity represented by the leading candidates, conventional biases and reductionist thinking facilitated the preservation of the illusion of inclusion. By failing to interrogate the intersecting factors of identity, the deeper structural issues surrounding race, class, and gender were obscured.

Race, culture, and difference can be simultaneously centralized and obscured, reinforcing the illusion of inclusion. Systems that superficially acknowledge diversity often mask the persistent inequalities that continue to affect marginalized communities, creating an appearance of progress while maintaining the status quo.

The European Union's reception system has been criticized as an illusion of inclusion, as it marginalizes non-wealthy and vulnerable individuals, often forcing them to engage in illegal and criminal activities to survive. Although the system appears to offer inclusion and support, its underlying structure perpetuates inequality and exclusion for marginalized groups.

== Sex, sexuality, and gender ==
The Illusion of Inclusion: Women in Postsecondary Education examined the illusion of inclusion in the context of postsecondary education. Women in Canada have historically faced limited access to higher education and unequal participation compared to men. Discrimination and marginalization of women on Canadian campuses have occurred at both institutional and interpersonal levels. The study highlighted various issues, including the risk of physical and sexual assault on campus, sexual harassment in classrooms and professors' offices, the normalization of racist, sexist, and homophobic jokes by male professors and students, the lack of female role models (e.g., professors) for women—particularly Aboriginal and Black women—and insufficient attention and mentorship provided by professors to female students.

The cosmetic industry, which once exclusively featured white women in advertisements and as spokeswomen, has since incorporated light-skinned women of color as part of its marketing strategy. This inclusion, however, has been characterized as an illusion of inclusion, designed to attract women of color who may feel alienated by products marketed solely to white consumers. By featuring a few light-skinned women of color with Anglo features, the industry maintains the appearance of diversity while continuing to promote an underlying message about the superiority of whiteness.

The illusion of inclusion allows white feminists to perpetuate racism within the feminist movement under the guise of diversity. Although diversity is superficially acknowledged, the underlying power structures and biases within the feminist movement remain unchallenged, allowing white feminist perspectives to dominate while marginalizing the voices and concerns of women of color.

While the United States has made strides in securing rights and protections for GLBTQ individuals, the prevailing model of inclusion and homonormativity has often privileged well-to-do, white, homosexual men. Closer scrutiny reveals that many progressive practices (e.g., those implemented in schools) benefit only certain segments of the GLBTQ community while disadvantaging others, particularly along intersecting lines of race, gender, sexuality, and class. Power relations play a significant role in shaping the concept of GLBTQ "inclusion." Critical examinations of GLBTQ inclusion and curricular resources have demonstrated that these practices remain limited and exclusionary. Furthermore, they reinforce existing power structures of oppression and contribute to a larger project of homonationalism, where homonormative subjects are molded into ideal members of the nation-state.

Heteronormative bias and the illusion of inclusion within the gender paradigm often result in intimate partner violence being assumed to involve a male perpetrator and a female victim. This assumption overlooks the reality that perpetrators can also be gay, lesbian, bisexual, and transgender individuals. As a result, non-heteronormative cases of intimate partner violence are frequently ignored or inadequately addressed, perpetuating a limited understanding of violence within diverse relationships.
