= History of Humanity =

Text by UNESCO

History of Humanity - Volume I

The History of Humanity is part of UNESCO's General and Regional Histories Collection. The publication seeks to contribute to mutual understanding and dialogue between cultures and civilizations. This series seeks to illustrate the encounters between cultures across history and their respective contributions to the general progress of humankind. This is done through the promotion of a pluralist vision of history.

== Objectives and Main Themes ==
“Combining political, cultural, social and economic history, the many volumes produced have put in perspective, what constitutes, in the diversity of practices, the conceptions and memories that form part of the common heritage of humanity. That was, in particular, the objective of the History of the Scientific and Cultural Development of Mankind.” Koichiro Matsuura, Director-General of UNESCO, 2009 [1]

The History of Humanity – Scientific and Cultural Development (the complete title of the first edition of the series) provides a universal history of humanity, encompassing a multiplicity of points of view, memories, and opinions from all over the world and from varying points in history. This major task was undertaken by UNESCO with the collaboration of over 450 distinguished scholars and researchers. This account of history explores the vastness of human cultural progress around the world, seeking to promote mutual respect and solidarity through the disarming of history.

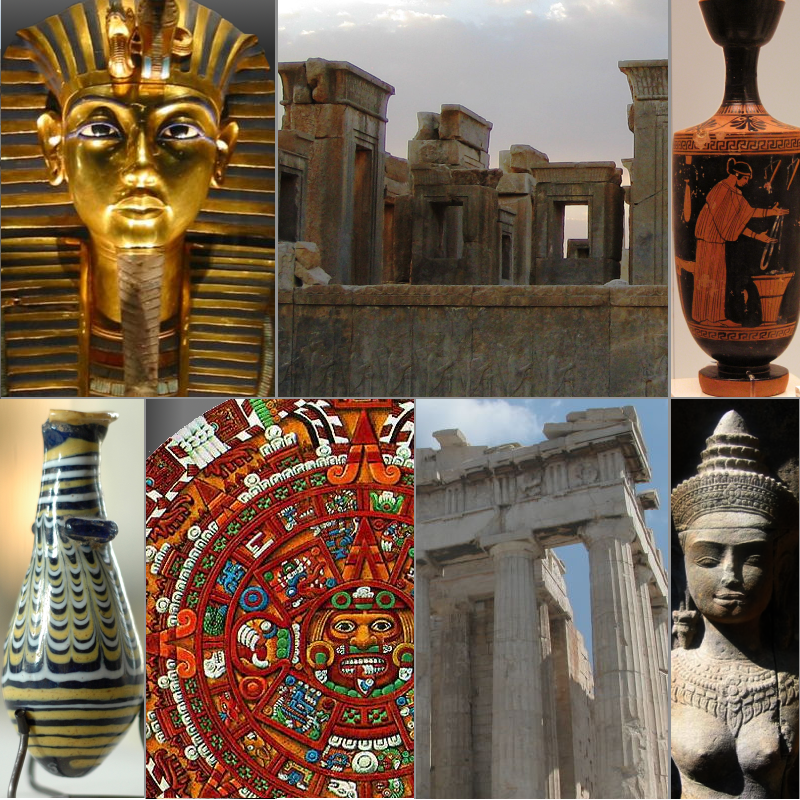
Ancient Civilizations Copyright William R. Wilson via Wikimedia Commons

The volumes begin with the prehistoric period and the beginnings of civilization, and go through to the twentieth century. Traditional methods of historical research based on written sources are used along with more contemporary critical methods, oral sources, and contributions from archaeology. The History of Humanity was published in six volumes and in several languages, including English, French, Italian, Russian, Spanish and Portuguese.

== History ==
The initial ideas for UNESCO to work on a project illustrating the collective memory of humanity were raised in 1946. Following the establishment of the International Scientific Committee and the formation of international teams to undertake the research, the first edition of this series, The History of Humanity - Scientific and Cultural Development, was completed in 1966. Over the following decades, with unprecedented developments in social and physical sciences and technological advances, the project was adapted and again readapted to properly reflect these changes. The second edition was therefore prepared beginning in 1980 and completed in 2009.

== Volumes ==
- Volume I: Prehistory and the Beginnings of Civilizations

Edited by S.J. De Laet, A.H. Dani, J.L. Lorenzo and R.B. Nunoo

- Volume II: From the Third Millennium to the Seventh Century B.C.

Edited by A.H. Dani, J.P. Mohen, J.L. Lorenzo, C.A. Diop, V.M. Masson, T. Obenga, M.B. Sakellariou, B.K. Thapar, Xia Nai, Zhang Changshou

- Volume III: From the Seventh Century B.C. to the Seventh Century A.D.

Edited by E. Condurachi, J. Herrmann, E. Zürcher, J. Harmatta, J. Litvak King, R. Lonis, T. Obenga, R. Thapar, Zhou Yiliang

- Volume IV: From the Seventh to the Sixteenth Century

Edited by M. A. Al-Bakhit, L. Bazin, S. M. Cissoko, A.A. Kamel, M. S. Asimov, P. Gendrop, A. Gieysztor, I. Habib, Y. Karayannopoulos, J. Litvak King, P. Schmidt

- Volume V: From the Sixteenth to the Eighteenth Century

Edited by P. Burke, H. Inalcik, I. Habib, J. Ki-Zerbo, T. Kusamitsu, C. Martínez Shaw, E. Tchernjak, E. Trabulse

- Volume VI: The Nineteenth Century

Edited by P. Mathias, N. Todorov, G. Carrera Damas, A.O. Chibariyan, Shu-Li Ji, I.D. Thiam

- Volume VII: The Twentieth Century

Edited by S. Gopal, S.L. Tikhvinsky, I.A. Abu-Lughod, G. Weinberg, I.D. Thiam, W. Tao
