= Afrocentric =

The terms "Afrocentric", "African-centered", and "Afrocentrist" may refer to:

- Afrocentrism, popular culture and ideology focused on the history and culture of black Africans
- Afrocentricity, a research method and methodological paradigm used in Black studies to center black Africans as subjects and agents within their own historical and cultural contexts
