= Marimba Ani =

American anthropologist

- Education: The New School; University of Chicago
- Scientific career
- Fields: Anthropology; African studies

Marimba Ani (born Dona Richards) is an anthropologist and African Studies scholar best known for her work Yurugu, a comprehensive critique of European thought and culture, and her coining of the term "Maafa" for the African holocaust.

== Life and work ==
Marimba Ani completed her BA degree at the University of Chicago, and holds MA and Ph.D. degrees in anthropology from the Graduate Faculty of the New School University. In 1964, during Freedom Summer, she served as an SNCC field secretary, and married civil-rights activist Bob Moses; they divorced in 1966. She has taught as a professor of African Studies in the Department of Black and Puerto Rican Studies at Hunter College in New York City, and is credited with introducing the term Maafa to describe the African Holocaust.

== Yurugu ==
Ani's 1994 work, Yurugu: An Afrikan-Centered Critique of European Cultural Thought and Behavior, examines the influence of European culture on the formation of modern institutional frameworks, through colonialism and imperialism, from an African perspective. Described by the author as an "intentionally aggressive polemic," the book derives its title from a Dogon legend of an incomplete and destructive being rejected by its creator.

External audio
- "Marimba Ani speaks" – Yurugu and the European asili

Examining the causes of global white supremacy, Ani argues that European thought implicitly believes in its own superiority, stating: "European culture is unique in the assertion of political interest."

In Yurugu, Ani proposes a tripartite conceptualization of culture, based on the concepts of

1. Asili, the central seed or "germinating matrix" of a culture;
2. Utamawazo, "culturally structured thought" or worldview, "the way in which the thought of members of a culture must be patterned if the asili is to be fulfilled"; and
3. Utamaroho, a culture's "vital force" or "energy source" which "gives it its emotional tone and motivates the collective behavior of its members."

The terms Ani uses in this framework are based on Swahili. Asili is a Swahili word meaning "origin" or "essence"; utamawazo and utamaroho are neologisms created by Ani, based on the Swahili words utamaduni ("civilisation"), wazo ("thought") and roho ("spirit life"). The utamawazo and utamaroho are not viewed as separate from the asili, but as its manifestations, which are "born out of the asili and, in turn, affirm it."

Ani characterizes the asili of European culture as dominated by the concepts of separation and control, with separation establishing dichotomies like "man" and "nature"; "the European" and "the other"; "thought" and "emotion." Ani writes that "the use of abstract 'universal' formulations in the European experience has been to control people, to impress them, and to intimidate them."

According to Ani's model, the utamawazo of European culture "is structured by ideology and bio-cultural experience," and its utamaroho or vital force is domination, reflected in all European-based structures and the imposition of Western values and civilization on peoples around the world, destroying cultures and languages in the name of progress.

The book also addresses the use of the term Maafa, based on a Swahili word meaning "great disaster," to describe slavery. African-centered thinkers have subsequently popularized and expanded on Ani's conceptualization. Citing both the centuries-long history of slavery and more recent examples like the Tuskegee study, Ani argues that Europeans and white Americans have an "enormous capacity for the perpetration of physical violence against other cultures" that had resulted in "antihuman, genocidal" treatment of blacks.

=== Critical reception ===
Philip Higgs, in African Voices in Education, describes Yurugu as an "excellent delineation of the ethics of harmonious coexistence between human beings", but cites the book's "overlooking of structures of social inequality and conflict that one finds in all societies, including indigenous ones," as a weakness. Molefi Kete Asante describes Yurugu as an "elegant work". Stephen Howe accuses Ani of having little interest in actual Africa (beyond romance) and challenges her critique of "Eurocentric" logic since she invests heavily in its usage in the book.

== Publications ==
- "The Ideology of European Dominance," The Western Journal of Black Studies. Vol. 3, No. 4, Winter, 1979, and Présence Africaine, No. 111, 3rd Quarterly, 1979.
- "European Mythology: The Ideology of Progress," in M. Asante and A. Vandi (eds), Contemporary Black Thought, Beverly Hills: Sage Publications, 1980 (59–79).
- Let The Circle Be Unbroken: The Implications of African Spirituality in the Diaspora. New York: Nkonimfo Publications, 1988 (orig. 1980).
- "Let The Circle Be Unbroken: The Implications of African-American Spirituality," Présence Africaine. No. 117-118, 1981.
- "The Nyama of the Blacksmith: The Metaphysical Significance of Metallurgy in Africa," Journal of Black Studies. Vol. 12, No. 2, December 1981.
- Let The Circle Be Unbroken: The Implications of African Spirituality in the Diaspora. New Jersey: Red Sea Press, 1992.
- "The African 'Aesthetic' and National Consciousness," in Kariamu Welsh-Asante (ed.), The African Aesthetic, Westport, Ct.: Greenwood Press, 1993 (63–82)
- Yurugu: An Afrikan-centered Critique of European Cultural Thought and Behavior. Trenton: Africa World Press, 1994.
- "The African Asili," in Selected Papers from the Proceedings of the Conference on Ethics, Higher Education and Social Responsibility, Washington, D.C.: Howard University Press, 1996.
- "To Heal a People", in Erriel Kofi Addae (ed.), To Heal a People: Afrikan Scholars Defining a New Reality, Columbia, MD.: Kujichagulia Press, 1996 (91–125).
- "Writing as a means of enabling Afrikan Self-determination," in Elizabeth Nuñez and Brenda M. Greene (eds), Defining Ourselves; Black Writers in the 90's, New York: Peter Lang, 1999 (209–211).

== See also ==
- Afrocentrism
- Cheikh Anta Diop
- John Henrik Clarke
- Leonard Jeffries
- Molefi Kete Asante
