= Nah Dove =

Scholar of African-American studies

- Born: 1940s
- Education: Polytechnic of North London (University of North London); Institute of Education; State University of New York at Buffalo
- Occupations: Author, lecturer and scholar
- Employer: Temple University
- Notable work: Afrikan Mothers: Bearers of Culture, Makers of Social Change (1998); The Afrocentric School: A Blueprint (2021); Being Human Being: Transforming the Race Discourse (2021)
- Relatives: Evelyn Dove; Mabel Dove Danquah (aunts)

Nah Dove (born 1940s) is an author, lecturer and scholar in African-American studies. She has lived in Ghana, Nigeria, Sierra Leone, Canada, the UK, and in the US, where she is an assistant professor instruction in the department of Africology and African American studies at the college of liberal arts, Temple University, Philadelphia.

Her book Afrikan Mothers: Bearers of Culture, Makers of Social Change was published in 1998; some of her other publications include The Afrocentric School [a blueprint] (2021), Being Human Being: Transforming the Race Discourse (Universal Write Publications, 2021) co-authored with Dr Molefi Kete Asante, and a contribution to the 2019 anthology New Daughters of Africa, edited by Margaret Busby.

== Background ==
Born to a Ghanaian father and an English mother, Nah Dove spent her early years in West Africa, before going with her family to live in Britain. She said in a 2015 interview with Angela Cobbinah: "I found England hostile and a place where I didn't fit in anywhere – I really hated school." She was in her early twenties when she first married and became a mother, and after the failure of a second marriage she successfully raised six children as a single parent. She defines herself as "a proud mother, grandmother and great grandmother". At the age of 40 she studied for a degree at the Polytechnic of North London (later University of North London), after which she won a bursary in 1990 to study for a master's degree in sociology at the Institute of Education, with specific reference to the education of black children.

Encouraged by civil rights activist Ida Mae Holland, whom she met at the London opening of Holland's play From the Mississippi Delta, Dove decided to continue her studies in the United States. Focusing her research on African culture, women and education, she earned a PhD in American studies from the State University of New York at Buffalo (SUNY Buffalo). She went on to become an assistant professor in the department of African American studies there, and also lectured at Temple and Penn State universities in Pennsylvania, before moving to teach at Medgar Evers Community University in New York.

Her 1998 book Afrikan Mothers was described by Cecile Wright of Nottingham Trent University as providing "a unique and powerful account of Afrikan women's attempts to challenge and resist contemporary conditions, particularly in relation to racism, schooling, and education. Nah Dove's book ... enriches us with its blend of empirical 'rich descriptiveness' and subtle theorizing. A vital book for readers and students of Afrikan studies, women's studies, cultural studies, education, Afrikan American studies, and sociology." Among other endorsements, one from Kariamu Welsh Asante notes: "Dr. Dove speaks as an Afrikan mother, activist, and scholar and this combination infuses her work with humility and conviction. Nah Dove is to be commended for this gift to all 'bearers of cultures.' Her wisdom makes her one of 'the women who gather at the grindstones.'"

Afrikan Mothers: Bearers of Culture, Makers of Social Change was selected in 1999 as Best Scholarly Book by the Association of Nubian Kemetic Heritage of the United States. She has written articles, chapters, encyclopaedic entries including for the Encyclopedia of African Cultural Heritage in North America (edited by Mwalimu J. Shujaa and Kenya J. Shujaa) and Encyclopedia of Black Studies (edited by Molefi Asante), and is a contributor to the 2019 anthology New Daughters of Africa (edited by Margaret Busby). Her aunt Mabel Dove-Danquah was included in the earlier companion volume, Daughters of Africa (1992).

In 2019, Dove joined the faculty at the College of Liberal Arts, Temple University in Philadelphia, Pennsylvania, where she is an assistant professor instruction in the department of Africology and African American studies.

== Selected writings ==
=== Books ===
- Afrikan Mothers: Bearers of Culture, Makers of Social Change, State University of New York Press, 1998, ISBN 978-0791438817.
- The Afrocentric School [a blueprint], Universal Write Publications, 2021, ISBN 9781942774051.
- Being Human Being: Transforming the Race Discourse, Universal Write Publications, 2021, ISBN 978-1942774099.

=== Book contributions ===
- 1994: "The Emergence of Black Supplementary Schools as Forms of Resistance to Racism in the UK". In Shujaa, M. (ed.), Too Much Schooling, Too Little Education: A Paradox of Black Life in White Society. Trenton, NJ: Africa World Press.
- 1996: "Understanding Education for Cultural Affirmation". In Roberson, E. (ed.), To Heal a People: African Scholars Defining a New Reality.
- 1998: "An African Centered Critique of Marx’s Logic". In Altschuler (ed.), The Living Legacy of Marx, Durkheim & Weber: Applications and Analyses of Classical Sociological Theory by Modern Social Scientists. Gordian Knot Books. University of Nebraska Press.
- 2003: "Defining African Womanism". In Mazama, A. (ed.), The Afrocentric Paradigm. Trenton, NJ: Africa World Press.
- 2007: "African Mothers: A case study of Northern Ghanaian Women". In Mazama, A. (ed.), Africa in the 21st Century: Toward a New Future. New York/London: Routledge.
- 2019: "Race and Sex, Growing up in the UK". In Busby, M. (ed.), New Daughters of Africa: An international anthology of writing by women of African descent, 2019.

=== Journal articles ===
- "Education and Culture: The Crisis of the African Intellectual", Urban Education, Vol. 31, Issue 4, 1 November 1996;31(4):357–380.
- "African Womanism: An Afrocentric Theory", Journal of Black Studies, Vol. 28, Issue 5, May 1998.
- "Defining a Mother-Centered Matrix to Analyze the Status of Women", Journal of Black Studies, Vol. 33, Issue 1, 1 September 2002, pp. 3–24.
- "A Return to Traditional Health Care Practices: A Ghanaian Study", Journal of Black Studies, Vol. 40, No. 5 (May 2010), pp. 823–834.
- "Race Revisited: Against a Cultural Construction bearing Significant Implications", International Journal of African Renaissance Studies, July 2018.
