= Maafa =

Swahili neologism for the Atlantic Slave Trade

The Maafa (Swahili for "Great disaster"), the African Holocaust, the Holocaust of Enslavement, or the Black Holocaust are political neologisms popularized since 1988 to describe the history and ongoing effects of atrocities inflicted upon Black people worldwide. Of particular focus are those committed by non-Africans (specifically Europeans and Arabs in the context of the Trans-Saharan slave trade, the Indian Ocean slave trade, the Red Sea slave trade, and the Atlantic slave trade), which continue to the present day through imperialism, colonialism and other forms of oppression..

== Description ==
Maulana Karenga puts slavery in the broader context of the Maafa, suggesting that its effects exceed mere physical persecution and legal disenfranchisement: the "destruction of human possibility involved redefining African humanity to the world, poisoning past, present and future relations with others who only know us through this stereotyping and thus damaging the truly human relations among peoples".

The Canadian scholar Adam Jones characterized the mass death of millions of Africans in the Atlantic slave trade as a genocide due to it being "one of the worst holocausts in human history" because it resulted in 15 to 20 million deaths according to one estimate, and he claims that arguments to the contrary such as "it was in slave owners' interest to keep slaves alive, not exterminate them" are "mostly sophistry" by stating: "the killing and destruction were intentional, whatever the incentives to preserve survivors of the Atlantic passage for labor exploitation. To revisit the issue of intent already touched on: If an institution is deliberately maintained and expanded by discernible agents, though all are aware of the hecatombs of casualties it is inflicting on a definable human group, then why should this not qualify as genocide?"

== History and terminology ==
The usage of the Swahili term: Maafa, lit. 'Great Disaster' in English was introduced by Marimba Ani's 1988 book Let the Circle Be Unbroken: The Implications of African Spirituality in the Diaspora. It is derived from a Swahili term for "disaster, terrible occurrence or great tragedy". The term was popularized in the 1990s. The Maafa represents a way to discuss the historic atrocities and impact of the African Slave Trade.

The term African Holocaust is preferred by some academics, such as Maulana Karenga, because it implies intention. One problem noted by Karenga is that the word Maafa can also translate to "accident" and in the view of some scholars the holocaust of enslavement was not accidental. Ali Mazrui notes that the word "holocaust" is a "dual plagiarism" since the term is derived from Ancient Greek and thus despite being associated with the genocide of the Jews, no one can have a monopoly over the term. Mazrui states: "This borrowing from borrowers without attribution is what I call 'the dual plagiarism.' But this plagiarism is defensible because the vocabulary of horrors like genocide and enslavement should not be subject to copyright-restrictions".

Some Afrocentric scholars prefer the term Maafa instead of African Holocaust because they believe that indigenous African terminology more truly conveys the events. The term Maafa may serve "much the same cultural psychological purpose for Africans as the idea of the Holocaust serves to name the culturally distinct Jewish experience of genocide under German Nazism". Other arguments in favor of Maafa rather than African Holocaust emphasize that the denial of the validity of the African people's humanity is an unparalleled centuries-long phenomenon: "The Maafa is a continual, constant, complete, and total system of human negation and nullification"-

The historian Sylviane Diouf posits that terms like "Atlantic slave trade" are deeply problematic because they serve as euphemisms for intense violence and mass murder. Referred to as a "trade", this prolonged period of persecution and suffering is rendered as a commercial dilemma, rather than a moral atrocity. With trade as the primary focus, the broader tragedy becomes consigned to a secondary point as mere "collateral damage" of a commercial venture. However, others feel that avoidance of the term "trade" is an apologetic act on behalf of capitalism, absolving capitalist structures of involvement in human catastrophe. Roger Garaudy accused America of genocide up to an estimated two hundred million Africans.

== See also ==
- African Renaissance
- Anti-African sentiment
- Black genocide in the United States
- Holocaust (disambiguation)
- Herero and Nama genocide
- Atrocities in the Congo Free State
- How Europe Underdeveloped Africa (1974)
- Ivan van Sertima
- Pan-Africanism
- Post Traumatic Slave Syndrome (2005)
- Reparations for slavery
