= Théophile Obenga =

Congolese academic and politician

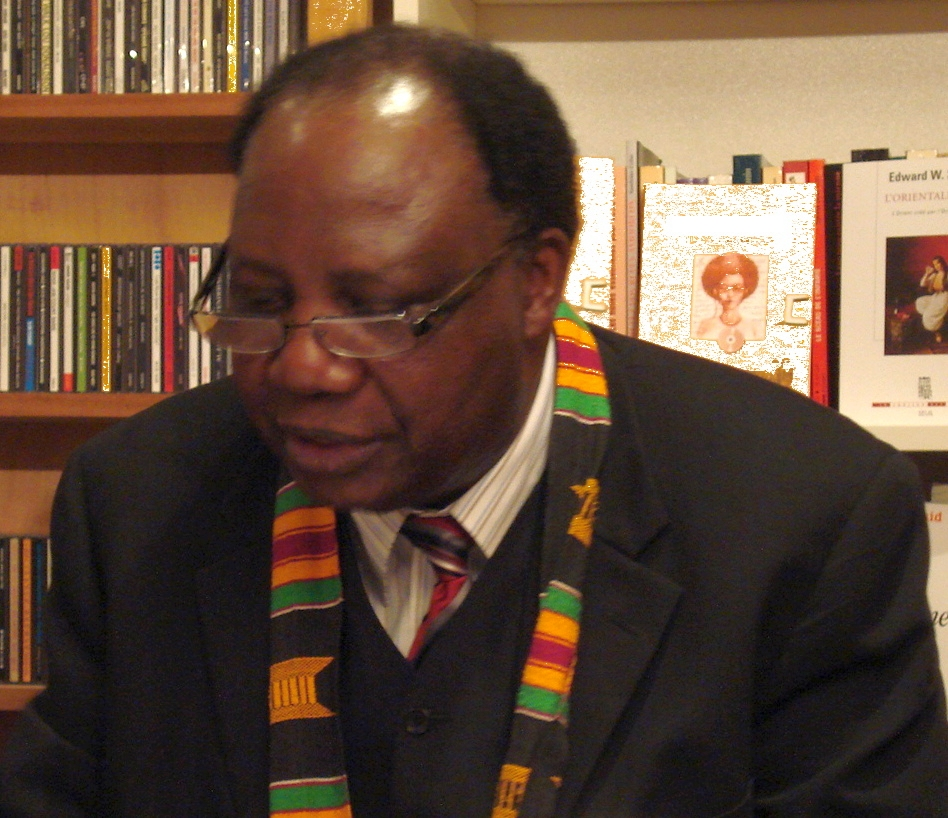
Théophile Obenga in a 2009 photograph

Théophile Obenga (born 1936 in the Republic of the Congo) is professor emeritus in the Africana Studies Center at San Francisco State University. He is a politically active proponent of Pan-Africanism. Obenga is an Egyptologist, linguist, and historian.

== Background ==
Obenga was born in 1936 in Brazzaville, Republic of the Congo.

Théophile Obenga has studied a wide variety of subjects and has obtained a wide range of degrees. His degrees include:

- M.A. in Philosophy (University of Bordeaux, France)
- M.Ed. (University of Pittsburgh, U.S.A.)
- M.A. in History (University of Paris, Sorbonne)
- Advanced studies in History, Linguistics, and Egyptology (University of Geneva, Switzerland); in Prehistory (Institut de Paléontologie Humaine, Paris), and in Linguistics, Philology, and Egyptology (University of Paris, Sorbonne, and College de France)

Théophile Obenga holds a Ph.D. in Letters, Arts and Humanities from Montpellier University, France. He is a member of the French Association of Egyptologists (Société Française D’Egyptologie) and of the African Society of Culture (Présence Africaine). He contributed to the United Nations Educational and Scientific Cultural Organization (UNESCO) program consecrated to writing of the General History of Africa and the Scientific and Cultural History of Humanity. He was, until the end of 1991, Director General of the Centre International des Civilisations Bantu (CICIBA) in Libreville, Gabon. He is the Director and Chief Editor of the journal Ankh. From January 28 to February 3, 1974, Obenga, Cheikh Anta Diop, and numerous professors from Egypt and Sudan were Africa's representatives to the UNESCO symposium in Cairo on "The Peopling of Ancient Egypt and the Deciphering of the Meroitic Script".

== Linguistic analysis ==
During the 1974 UNESCO Cairo symposium, The peopling of ancient Egypt and the deciphering of the Meroitic script, Cheikh Anta Diop and Obenga were among its participants. Adding on to Diop's African origin of ancient Egypt model, Theophile Obenga focused on linguistics. Obenga criticized Joseph Greenberg's mass comparison method, for its inability to prove genetic relationships among languages. He cited the work of Istvan Fodor who also criticized Greenberg's multi lateral comparative analysis. Obenga through the usage of the historical comparative method sought to prove that the Egyptian language is genetically related to the majority of the languages in Africa. Obenga analyzed typological similarities in grammar as well as examined the word forms of ancient Egyptian and numerous African languages such as Wolof and discovered that the similarities between the ancient Egyptian language and the African languages he analyzed to be greater than the similarities between the Semitic, Berber, and Egyptian languages, which Greenberg grouped together as the Afroasiatic languages. Obenga revealed 101 putative cognates in African languages classified in different families by Greenberg. These languages share the same word across the length and breadth of the continent. According to Kambon, the sheer spatial and temporal depth involved makes the notion that these terms were borrowed from one language family to another highly unlikely. These lexical commonalities point to a common ancestral proto-language from which they are all descended.

Obenga proposes three major language families for Africa:

- Berber
- Khoisan
- Paleo African/Negro-Egyptian.

Obenga developed Cheikh Anta Diop's Paleo African language family as Negro-Egyptian. This family is composed of:

- Ancient Egyptian
- Chadic
- Coptic
- Cushitic
- Niger-Kordofanian
- Nilo-Saharan

Rules of historical linguistics “Historical linguistics” or even “historical genetic linguistics” consists of a diachronic perspective of the study of languages aiming to account for the dynamic nature of linguistic phenomena. To do this, this scientific discipline mobilizes descriptive data made available by synchronic linguistic studies (lexicology, phonology, morphology, grammar, etc.), by comparing them from one language to others (or from language to language). within a corpus previously determined through the empirical observation of a few similarities. This comparative approach aims, according to him, to test said similarities, in order to know if they are “fortuitous”, “borrowed”, “convergent”, or even “inherited”. In the group of languages considered, only the regular character of inherited linguistic properties would constitute the “genetic relationship” common to these languages. In other words, according to Obenga, we should only speak of “genetic kinship” common to languages, on the one hand if they present inherited similarities between them; on the other hand if the regular evolution in time and space of said similarities can be highlighted by the method of historical linguistics. Théophile Obenga, believing that the "ultimate goal of this linguistics is to be able to carry out a general classification of all known human languages", undertook - following Cheikh Anta Diop - to apply the method of historical linguistics to “Negro-African” linguistic phenomena.

== Bibliography ==
- L'Afrique dans l'Antiquité. Égypte pharaonique, Afrique noire. Paris: Présence Africaine. 1973.
- Introduction à la connaissance du peuple de la République Populaire du Congo. Brazzaville: Librairies Populaires. 1973.
- Afrique centrale précoloniale – Documents d'histoire vivante. Paris: Présence Africaine. 1974. ISBN 2708703129.
- La Cuvette Congolaise. Les hommes et les structures. Contribution à l'histoire traditionnelle de l'Afrique centrale. Paris: Présence Africaine. 1976. ISBN 2708703250.
- Le Zaïre, Civilisations traditionnelles et Culture moderne (Archives culturelles d'Afrique centrale). Paris: Présence Africaine. 1977.
- La vie de Marien Ngouabi 1938-1977. Paris: Présence Africaine. 1977.
- Stèles pour l'avenir: poèmes. Paris: Présence Africaine. 1978. ISBN 2708703498.
- Pour une Nouvelle Histoire. Paris: Présence Africaine. 1980. ISBN 2708703781.
- La dissertation historique en Afrique. A l'usage des étudiants de Première Année d'Université. Paris: Présence Africaine. 1980. ISBN 9782708703865.
- Sur le chemin des hommes: Essai sur la poésie négro-africaine. Paris: Présence Africaine. 1984. ISBN 2708704397.
- Littérature traditionnelle des Mbochi. Etsee le Yamba. Paris: Présence Africaine. 1984. ISBN 2708704370.
- Les Bantu, Langues-Peuples-Civilisations. Paris: Présence Africaine. 1985.
- Discours et écrits politiques de Jacques Opangault. Paris: Présence Africaine. 1987.
- Astres si longtemps. Poèmes en Sept Chants. Paris: Présence Africaine. 1988. ISBN 2708705008.
- La Philosophie africaine de la période pharaonique – 2780-330 avant notre ère. Paris: L’Harmattan. 1990.
  - English translation: African Philosophy – The Pharaonic Period: 2780-330 BC. Dakar: Per Ankh. 2004.
- Saakana, Amon Saba, ed. (1992). Ancient Egypt and Black Africa: A Student's Handbook for the Study of Ancient Egypt in Philosophy, Linguistics and Gender Relations. London: Karnak House.
- Origine commune de l'égyptien ancien, du copte et des langues négro-africaines modernes – Introduction à la linguistique historique africaine. Paris: L’Harmattan. 1993.
- La Géométrie égyptienne – Contribution de l'Afrique antique à la mathématique mondiale. Paris: L’Harmattan/Khepera. 1995.
- Cheikh Anta Diop, Volney et le Sphinx – Contribution de Cheikh Anta Diop à l'historiographie mondiale. Paris: Présence Africaine/Khepera. 1996.
- L'histoire sanglante du Congo-Brazzaville (1959-1997)– Diagnostic d'une mentalité politique africaine. Paris: Présence Africaine. 1998.
- Pour le Congo-Brazzaville – Réflexions et propositions. Paris: L’Harmattan. 2001.
- Le sens de la lutte contre l'africanisme eurocentriste. Paris: Khepera/L'Harmattan. 2001.
- L'UNIVERSITÉ AFRICAINE dans le cadre de l'Union Africaine. Paris: Pyramide Papyrus Presse. 2003.
- L'Égypte, la Grèce et l'école d'Alexandrie – Histoire interculturelle dans l'Antiquité – Aux sources égyptiennes de la philosophie grecque. Paris: Khepera/L’Harmattan. 2005.
- L'égyptien pharaonique : une langue négro-africaine : égyptien, dagara, doruba, baule, dogon, langues du Bhar el-Ghazal. Paris: Présence Africaine. 2010. ISBN 9782708708075.

== See also ==
- Afrocentric historiography
- Black nationalism
