= Journal of Black Studies =

Black Studies academic journal

- Discipline: Black studies
- Language: English
- Edited by: Christel N. Temple

Publication details
- History: 1970-present
- Publisher: Sage Publications
- Frequency: Bimonthly
- Impact factor: 1.108 (2020)

Standard abbreviations
- ISO 4: J. Black Stud.

Indexing
- ISSN: 0021-9347 (print); 1552-4566 (web)
- LCCN: 77022565
- OCLC no.: 1799971

Links
- Journal homepage; Online access; Online archive

The Journal of Black Studies is a bimonthly peer-reviewed academic journal that publishes papers in the fields of social sciences and ethnic studies concerning African and African diaspora culture, with particular interest in African-American culture. As of 2023, the journal's editor-in-chief is Christel N. Temple (University of Pittsburgh), and the Deputy Editor is Bayyinah Jeffries (University of Tennessee). The black studies journal was established in 1970 by Molefi Kete Asante and is currently published by Sage Publishing.

== Abstracting and indexing ==
The Journal of Black Studies is abstracted and indexed in Scopus and the Social Sciences Citation Index, among other databases. According to Journal Citation Reports, its 2020 impact factor is 1.108, ranking it 82nd out of 109 journals in the category "Social Sciences" and 17th out of 20 journals in the category "Ethnic Studies".
