= Terry Kershaw =

American sociologist

- Born: September 3, 1952; New York City
- Died: October 28, 2015 (aged 63)
- Education: Washington State University
- Known for: Work on Africana Studies
- Scientific career
- Fields: Sociology
- Workplaces: University of Cincinnati and The College of Wooster
- Thesis: Attitude toward economic growth, personal economic experience and reasons for moving (1985)

Terry Kershaw (March 9, 1952 - October 28, 2015) was an American sociologist and professor of africana studies at the University of Cincinnati. He served as a board member of the National Council of Black Studies.

== Career ==
Kershaw was Chair of Sociology and Anthropology, and the Director of Black Studies at The College of Wooster.

== Selected publications ==
- "Emerging paradigm in Black Studies" in Africana Studies: Philosophical Perspectives and Theoretical Paradigms, edited by Delores P. Aldridge and E. Lincoln James. Pullman: Washington State University Press, 2007. ISBN 9780874222944
