= Katherine Bankole-Medina =

American professor

Academic work
- Discipline: History
- Sub-discipline: History of medicine; African-American history
- Institutions: Coppin State University

Katherine Olukemi Bankole-Medina was a professor of history and chair of the Department of History, Geography and Global Studies at Coppin State University. She specialized in histories of African American enslavement from a medical humanities perspective.

== Career ==
Bankole-Medina joined Coppin State University as professor and chair of the Department of History, Geography and Global Studies in 2008. Before this, she was the administrative director of the Center for Black Culture and Research and an Associate Professor of History in the Department of History at West Virginia University.

While at West Virginia University, Bankole-Medina was named a 2004-2005 Humanities Scholar for the West Virginia Humanities Grant Project “Segregation and Integration of High School Sports in West Virginia,” a project coordinated by Dana D. Brooks and Ronald Althouse. In 2006, she was named the Judith Gold Stitzel Endowment Teacher, and in 2007 she was awarded the WV Humanities Council Grant.

While at Coppin State University, Bankole-Medina received a Distinguished Faculty Researcher Award in 2009. In 2012, she was named a Fellow to the Molefi Kete Asante Institute in Philadelphia, PA. In 2018, Bankole-Medina was awarded a 2018-2019 Inclusion Imperative Visiting Faculty Fellowship from the Dresher Center for the Humanities at UMBC, funded by the Mellon Foundation, for her project entitled "African Americans as Specimens, Objects, and Agents: Race and Clinical Care in the Maryland Medical Journal, 1877-1918."

== Selected bibliography ==
=== Books ===
- Slavery and Medicine: Enslavement and Medical Practices in Antebellum Louisiana, New York: Garland Publishing, Inc., 1998 [reissued by Routledge, 2019]. ISBN 9781317713531.
- Self-Emancipated and Unforgotten Sisters: Memorial Accounts of Africana Women, 1815-1898, Silver Spring, MD: Society of Africana Women Studies Scholars, 2016. ISBN 978-0692724446.
- World To Come: The Baltimore Uprising, Militant Racism and History. Washington, D.C.: Liberated Scholars Press, 2016. ISBN 978-0692681510.

=== Articles ===
- 'A Preliminary Report and Commentary on the Structure of Graduate Afrocentric Research and Implications for the Advancement of the Discipline of Africalogy, 1980–2004,' Journal of Black Studies 36 (5), 2006, pp. 663–697.
- 'In the Age of Malcolm X: Social Conflict and the Critique of African American Identity Construction,' Malcolm X: A Historical Reader (Baltimore, MD: Carolina Academic Press, 2008, ch.13)
