= Kariamu Welsh =

American choreographer (1949–2021)

Kariamu Welsh Asante
- Born: Carole Ann Welsh; September 22, 1949; Thomasville, North Carolina, U.S.
- Died: October 12, 2021 (aged 72); Chapel Hill, North Carolina, U.S.
- Occupation: Choreographer
- Children: M. K. Asante (son)

Kariamu Welsh Asante (born Carole Ann Welsh; September 22, 1949 – October 12, 2021) was an American contemporary dance choreographer and scholar whose awards include a National Endowment for the Arts, three Senior Fulbright Scholar awards, and a Guggenheim Fellowship. She was a professor at Temple University's Boyer School of Music and Dance.

== Early life and education ==
Welsh was born in Thomasville, North Carolina, United States, the eldest child of Ruth Hoover.

She grew up in the Bedford-Stuyvesant part of New York City, where she, like other young girls, practiced her double Dutch jump rope moves. Once she began studying African dance, she realized that double Dutch jump roping connects to African traditional culture.

Welsh received her Doctorate of Arts in Dance History from New York University (1993) and her BA (1972; in English) and MA (1975; humanities) from the State University of New York at Buffalo.

== Career ==
In 1985, she joined Temple's department of Africology and African American Studies and in 1999 Temple's dance department, eventually becoming the director of Temple's Institute for African Dance Research and Performance. She retired in 2019. She was a scholar of cultural studies including performance and culture within Africa and the African diaspora. Welsh served as the Director of the Institute for African Dance Research and Performance.

As a teacher, Kariamu Welsh taught at community centers as well as at university level. Many of her students have gone on to their own careers in dance and academia, spreading her influence. One reason for her popularity and significance among her African American students, according to Dr. Kemal Nance, who was one of them, is that "Dr. Welsh changed the landscape of how we think about African dance by showing that what we do with our bodies is worthy of investigation."

Welsh was the author of numerous books, including Zimbabwe Dance: Rhythmic Forces, Ancestral Voices—An Aesthetic Analysis and Umfundalai: An African Dance Technique. She was the editor of The African Aesthetic: Keeper of Traditions and African Dance: An Artistic, Historical and Philosophical Inquiry. She co-edited African Culture: Rhythms of Unity.

She was the founding artistic director of the Zimbabwe National Dance Company.

=== Umfundalai dance technique ===
In the 1970s, Welsh established her own dance group, Kariamu & Company: Traditions, which adopted the Umfundalai dance technique, a pan-African contemporary technique still in use, that she created. The word umfundalai is Kiswahili for "essential." Based on both African artistic practices and diasporan African dance vocabulary, Umfundalai "seeks to articulate an essence of African–oriented movement" and, in Welsh's words, "an approach to movement that is wholistic [sic], body centric and organic."

According to Gregory King, one of her students, Umfundalai involves groundedness, polyrhythms, "and the articulation of the pelvis and hips"; it "celebrates all body sizes, giving permission to each body to speak many movement languages."

Under the aegis of The National Association of American African Dance Teachers, The Organization of Umfundalai Teachers continues to practice and train others to practice Welsh's dance technique as part of the expression of neo-traditional and contemporary diasporan African art.

=== Awards ===
Welsh received numerous fellowships, grants, and awards, including a National Endowment for the Arts Choreography Fellowship, the Creative Public Service Award of NY, a 1997 Pew Fellowship, a 1997 Simon Guggenheim Fellowship, a 1998 Pennsylvania Council on the Arts grant, and three Senior Fulbright Scholar Awards.

== Personal life ==
Welsh was married to Molefi Kete Asante, an American academic, whom she met when she was a student and he was a professor at the State University of New York at Buffalo; their marriage ended in 2000.

Welsh and Asante were both on Fulbrights and working in Zimbabwe when their son, the author, filmmaker, and hip-hop artist M. K. Asante, was born, although he grew up in Philadelphia when both parents were working at Temple University. Another son, Daahoud Jackson Asante, experienced incarceration.

At the time of her death, she was living in Chapel Hill, NC. She was survived by her mother; her brother, William Hoover, and sister, Sylvia Artis, her sons, and six grandchildren.
