= Babacar M'Baye =

Senegalese academic

- Born: 1967 (age 58–59); Saint-Louis, Senegal

Academic background
- Education: Université Gaston Berger de Saint-Louis; Pennsylvania State University; Bowling Green State University

Academic work
- Discipline: English; Pan-African studies
- Institutions: Kent State University
- Main interests: post-colonial and transnational Black diaspora cultures Pan-African literature, film and music
- Notable works: The trickster comes west: Pan-African influence in early Black diasporan narratives

Babacar M'Baye is a Senegalese academic, Professor of English and pan-African studies at Kent State University. His research interests include Pan-African literature, film and music, and post-colonial and transnational Black diaspora cultures.

== Life ==
M'Baye was born in Saint-Louis, Senegal, in 1967. He studied English from Université Gaston Berger de Saint-Louis before gaining an MA in American Studies from Pennsylvania State University. He received his PhD in American Culture Studies from Bowling Green State University.

M'Baye has emphasized the leading role played by Langston Hughes as a voice for black transnationalism and cosmopolitanism. He has written on the contested figure of the goordjiggen, the 'man-woman' or gender nonconformist, in Senegalese culture, and edited a collection on gender and sexuality in Senegalese societies. His work has also examined the enduring impact of the transatlantic slave trade on African institutions, by destabilizing African political institutions and creating an African slaver class parasitic on Western slave ships rather than local legitimacy.

== Works ==
=== Books ===
- The trickster comes west: Pan-African influence in early Black diasporan narratives. 2009.
- (ed. with Alexander Charles Oliver Hall) Crossing traditions: American popular music in local and global contexts. Lanham: The Scarecrow Press, Inc., 2013.
- Black cosmopolitanism and anticolonialism: pivotal moments. New York: Routledge, 2017.
- (ed. with Besi Brillian Muhonja) Gender and sexuality in Senegalese societies: critical perspectives and methods. Lanham, Maryland: Lexington Books, 2019.

=== Articles ===
- Review of Dudziak, Mary L., Exporting American Dreams: Thurgood Marshall's African Journey. H-Net Reviews, January 2009.
- Review of Gulick, Anne W., Literature, Law, and Rhetorical Performance in the Anticolonial Atlantic. H-Net Reviews, October 2018.
