= Molefi Kete Asante =

American academic (born 1942)

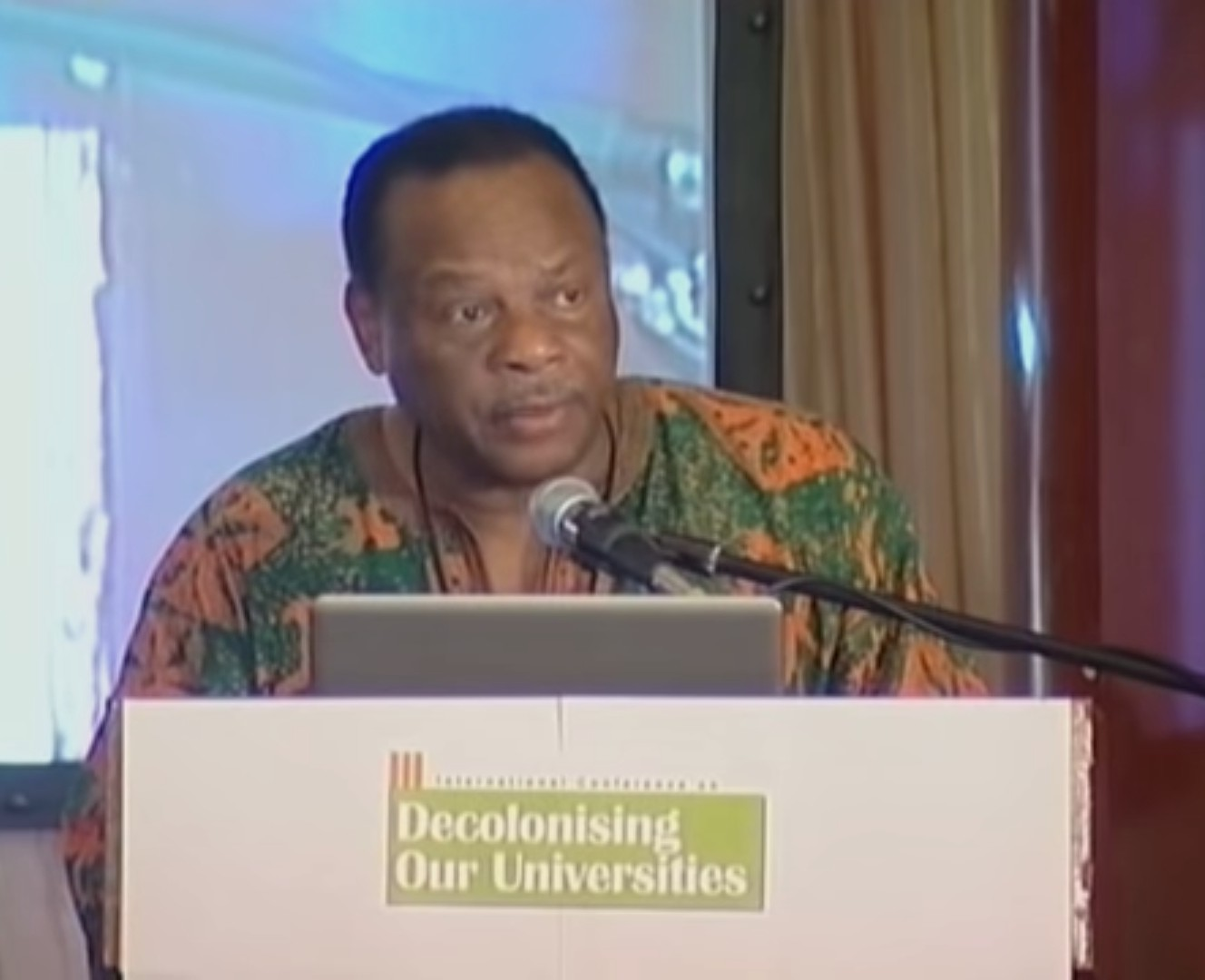
- Born: Arthur Lee Smith Jr. August 14, 1942 (age 84); Valdosta, Georgia, U.S.
- Occupations: Professor; Author
- Spouse: Ana Yenenga
- Website: drmolefiasante.squarespace.com

Molefi Kete Asante (/əˈsænteɪ/ ə-SAN-tay; born Arthur Lee Smith Jr.; August 14, 1942) is an American philosopher who is involved in the fields of African-American studies, African studies, and communication studies. He is currently a professor in the Department of Africology at Temple University, where he founded the PhD program in African-American Studies. He is president of the Molefi Kete Asante Institute for Afrocentric Studies.

Asante advocates for Afrocentricity. He is the author of more than 90 books and the founding editor of the Journal of Black Studies. He is the father of author and filmmaker M. K. Asante.

== Early life and education ==
Asante was born Arthur Lee Smith Jr. in Valdosta, Georgia, the fourth of sixteen children. His father, Arthur Lee Smith, worked in a peanut warehouse and then on the Georgia Southern Railroad; his mother worked as a domestic. During the summers Asante would return to Georgia to work in the tobacco and cotton fields in order to earn tuition for school. An aunt, Georgia Smith, influenced him to pursue his education; she gave him his first book, a collection of short stories by Charles Dickens.

Smith attended Nashville Christian Institute, a Church of Christ-founded boarding school for Black students, in Nashville, Tennessee. There he earned his high school diploma in 1960. While still in high school, he became involved with the Civil Rights Movement, joining the Fisk University student march in Nashville.

After graduation, he initially enrolled in Southwestern Christian College of Terrell, Texas, another historically Black institution with Church of Christ roots. There he met Nigerian Essien Essien, whose character and intelligence inspired Smith to learn more about Africa.

Smith received his B.A. from Oklahoma Christian College (now Oklahoma Christian University) in 1964. He did graduate work, earning his master's degree from Pepperdine University in 1965 with a thesis on Marshall Keeble, a Black preacher in the Church of Christ. Smith earned his PhD from UCLA in 1968 in communication studies. He worked for a time at UCLA, becoming the director of the center for Afro-American Studies. At the age of 30, he was appointed by the University at Buffalo as a full professor and head of the Department of Communication.

In 1976, Asante chose to make a legal name change because he considered "Arthur Lee Smith" a slave name.

== Career ==
At the University at Buffalo, Asante advanced the ideas of international and intercultural communication; he wrote and published with colleagues, Handbook of Intercultural Communication, the first book in the field. Asante was elected president of the Society for Intercultural Education, Training and Research in 1976. His work in intercultural communication made him a trainer of doctoral students in the field. Asante has directed more than one hundred PhD dissertations.

Asante published his first study of the Black movement, Rhetoric of Black Revolution, in 1969. Subsequently, he wrote Transracial Communication, to explain how race complicates human interaction in American society. Soon Asante changed his focus to African-American and African culture in communication, with attention to the nature of African-American oratorical style.

Asante wrote Afrocentricity: The Theory of Social Change (1980) to announce a break with the past, where African-Americans believed they were on the margins of Europe and did not have a sense of historical centrality. He wrote on the conflict between white cultural hegemony and the oppressed African culture, and on the lack of victorious consciousness among Africans, a theme found in his principal philosophical work, The Afrocentric Idea (1987). Additional works on Afrocentric theory included Kemet, Afrocentricity and Knowledge (1990), and An Afrocentric Manifesto (2007).

The Utne Reader identified Asante as one of the 100 leading thinkers in America, writing, "Asante is a genial, determined, and energetic cultural liberationist whose many books, including Afrocentricity and The Afrocentric Idea, articulate a powerful African-oriented pathway of thought, action, and cultural self-confidence for Black Americans."

In 1986, Asante proposed the first doctoral program in African-American studies at Temple University. The program received approval, and its first cohort commenced their studies in 1988. Over 500 applicants sought admission to the graduate program. Temple University emerged as a prominent leader in the field of African-American Studies; it was ten years before the next doctoral program was established at the University of Massachusetts Amherst in 1997. Graduates from Temple's program have made significant contributions globally, holding positions in various continents and countries, and many direct African American Studies programs at major universities.

=== Honors ===
- Given the regnal name of Nana Okru Asante Peasah and the chieftaincy title of Kyidomhene of the House of Tafo, Akyem Abuakwa, Ghana (1995)
- Given the chieftaincy title of the Wanadoo of Gao in the court of the Amiru (Paramount Chief) Hassimi Maiga of Songhai (2012)

== Afrocentricity ==
According to The Oxford History of Historical Writing: Historical Writing Since 1945, Asante has "based his entire career on Afrocentricity, and continues to defend it in spite of strong criticisms".

In 1980 Asante published Afrocentricity: The Theory of Social Change, which initiated a discourse around the issue of African agency and subject place in historical and cultural phenomena. He maintained that Africans had been moved off-center in terms on most questions of identity, culture, and history. Afrocentricity sought to place Africans at the center of their own narratives and to reclaim the teaching of African-American history from where it had been marginalized by Europeans.

The combination of the European centuries gives us about four to five hundred years of solid European domination of intellectual concepts and philosophical ideas. Africa and Asia were subsumed under various headings of the European hierarchy. If a war between the European powers occurred it was called a World War and the Asians and Africans found their way on the side of one European power or the other. There was this sense of assertiveness about European culture that advanced with Europe's trade, religious, and military forces.

Asante's book The Afrocentric Idea was a more intellectual book about Afrocentricity than the earlier popular book. After the second edition of The Afrocentric Idea was released in 1998, Asante appeared as a guest on a number of television programs, including The Today Show, 60 Minutes, and the MacNeil-Lehrer News Hour, to discuss his ideas.

According to Asante's Afrocentric Manifesto, an Afrocentric project requires a minimum of five characteristics: (1) an interest in a psychological location, (2) a commitment to finding the African subject place, (3) the defense of African cultural elements, (4) a commitment to lexical refinement, and (5) a commitment to correct the dislocations in the history of Africa.

I chose the term Afrocentricity to emphasize the fact that African people had been moved off of terms for the past five hundred years. In other words, Africans were not simply removed from Africa to the Americas, but Africans were separated from philosophies, languages, religions, myths, and cultures. Separations are violent and are often accompanied with numerous changes in individuals and groups. Finding a way to relocate or to reorient our thinking was essential to the presentation of African cultural reality. In fact, without such a reorientation, Africans have nothing to bring to the table of humanity but the experiences of Europeans, those who initially moved Africans off of social, cultural, and psychological terms.

== Selected bibliography ==
- Transracial Communication (Prentice Hall, 1973), ISBN 978-0-13-929505-8
- Contemporary Public Communication: Applications (Harper & Row, 1977)
- Mass Communication: Principles and Practices (Macmillan, 1979)
- Contemporary Black Thought: Alternative Analyses in Social and Behavioral Science (Sage, 1980)
- The Afrocentric Idea (Temple University Press, 1987, 1998)
- Afrocentricity (Africa World Press, 1988), ISBN 9780865430679
- The Painful Demise of Eurocentrism: An Afrocentric Response to Critics (Africa World Press, 1999), ISBN 978-0-86543-743-2
- Socio-Cultural Conflict between African American and Korean American (University Press of America, 2000)
- 100 Greatest African Americans (Prometheus, 2002)
- Afrocentricity: The Theory of Social Change (African American Images, 2003), ISBN 978-0913543795
- Erasing Racism: The Survival of the American Nation (Prometheus, 2003, 2009)
- Encyclopedia of Black Studies (Sage, 2004), ISBN 978-0-7619-2762-4
- Handbook of Black Studies (Sage, 2006), ISBN 978-0-7619-2840-9
- An Afrocentric Manifesto: Toward an African Renaissance (Polity, 2007), ISBN 978-0-7456-4103-4
- Cheikh Anta Diop: An Intellectual Portrait (Sankore Madrasah, 2007)
- Spear Masters: An Introduction to African Religion (University Press of America, 2007), ISBN 978-0-7618-3574-5
- Encyclopedia of African Religion (Sage, 2009), ISBN 978-1412936361
- Maulana Karenga: An Intellectual Portrait (Polity, 2009), ISBN 978-0745648279
- As I Run toward Africa: A Memoir (Paradigm Publishers, 2011), ISBN 978-1-61205-098-0
- The African American People: A Global History (Routledge, 2012), ISBN 978-0415872546
- Facing South to Africa: Toward an Afrocentric Critical Orientation (Lexington Books, 2014)
- Contemporary Critical Thought in Africology and Africana Studies (Lexington Books, 2016)
- Revolutionary Pedagogy: A Primer for Teachers of Black Children (Universal Write Publications, 2017), ISBN 978-0982532744
- (With Nah Dove) Being Human Being: Transforming the Race Discourse (Universal Write Publications, 2022), ISBN 9781942774099
