= Cheikh Anta Diop =

Senegalese politician, historian and scientist (1923–1986)

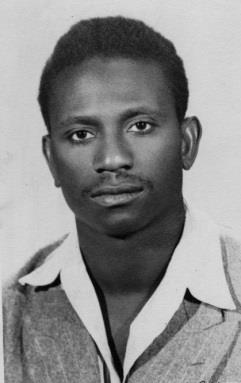
- Diop as a university student in Paris in the late 1940s
- Born: Seex Anta Jóob (in Wolof); 29 December 1923; Diourbel Region, French Senegal
- Died: 7 February 1986 (aged 62); Dakar, Senegal
- Education: University of Paris
- Occupations: Historian, anthropologist, physicist, politician
- Notable work: The African Origin of Civilization

Cheikh Anta Diop (29 December 1923 – 7 February 1986) was a Senegalese historian, anthropologist, physicist, and politician who studied the human race's origins and pre-colonial African culture. Diop's work is considered foundational to the theory of Afrocentricity, though he himself never described himself as an Afrocentrist. The questions he posed about cultural bias in scientific research contributed greatly to the postcolonial turn in the study of African civilizations.

Diop argued that there was a shared cultural continuity across African people that was more important than the varied development of different ethnic groups shown by differences among languages and cultures over time. Some of his ideas have been criticized as based upon outdated sources and an outdated conception of race. Other scholars have defended his work from what they see as widespread misrepresentation.

Cheikh Anta Diop University (formerly known as the University of Dakar), in Dakar, Senegal, is named after him.

== Early life ==
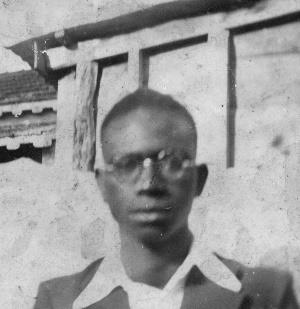
Diop at high school in Dakar

Born in Thieytou, Diourbel Region, Senegal, on 29 December 1923, Diop belonged to an aristocratic Muslim Wolof family in Senegal where he was educated in a traditional Islamic school. Diop's family was part of the Mouride brotherhood, the only independent Muslim fraternity in Africa according to Diop. He obtained the colonial equivalent of the metropolitan French baccalauréat in Senegal before moving to Paris to study for a degree.

== Studies in Paris ==
In 1946, at the age of 23, Diop went to Paris to study. He initially enrolled to study higher mathematics, but then enrolled to study philosophy in the Faculty of Arts of the University of Paris. He gained his first degree (licence) in philosophy in 1948, then enrolled in the Faculty of Sciences, receiving two diplomas in chemistry in 1950.

In 1948, Diop edited with Madeleine Rousseau, a professor of art history, a special edition of the journal Musée vivant, published by the Association populaire des amis des musées (APAM). APAM had been set up in 1936 by people on the political left wing to bring culture to wider audiences. The special edition of the journal was on the occasion of the centenary of the abolition of slavery in the French colonies and aimed to present an overview of issues in contemporary African culture and society. Diop contributed an article to the journal: "Quand pourra-t-on parler d'une renaissance africaine" (When we will be able to speak of an African Renaissance?). He examined various fields of artistic creation, with a discussion of African languages, which, he said, would be the sources of regeneration in African culture. He proposed that African culture should be rebuilt on the basis of ancient Egypt, in the same way that European culture was built upon the legacies of ancient Greece and Rome.

In 1949, Diop registered a proposed title for a Doctor of Letters thesis, "The Cultural Future of African thought", under the direction of Professor Gaston Bachelard. In 1951, he registered a second thesis title "Who were the pre-dynastic Egyptians" under Professor Marcel Griaule.

In 1953, Diop first met Frédéric Joliot-Curie, Marie Curie's son-in-law, and in 1957 Diop began specializing in nuclear physics at the Laboratory of Nuclear Chemistry of the College de France, which Frederic Joliot-Curie ran until his death in 1958, and the Institut Pierre et Marie Curie in Paris. Diop ultimately translated parts of Einstein's Theory of Relativity into his native Wolof.

According to Diop's own account, his education in Paris included History, Egyptology, Physics, Linguistics, Anthropology, Economics, and Sociology. In Paris, Diop studied under André Aymard, professor of History and later Dean of the Faculty of Letters at the University of Paris, and Diop said that he had "gained an understanding of the Greco-Latin world as a student of Gaston Bachelard, Frédéric Joliot-Curie, André Leroi-Gourhan, and others".

In his 1954 thesis, Diop argued that ancient Egypt had been populated by Black people. He specified that he used the terms "negro", "black", "white" and "race" as "immediate givens" in the Bergsonian sense, and went on to suggest operational definitions of these terms. He said that the Egyptian language and culture had later been spread to West Africa. When he published many of his ideas as the book Nations nègres et culture (Negro Nations and Culture), it made him one of the most controversial historians of his time.

In 1956, Diop re-registered a new proposed thesis for Doctor of Letters with the title "The areas of matriarchy and patriarchy in ancient times". From 1956, he taught physics and chemistry in two Paris lycées as an assistant master, before moving to the College de France. In 1957, he registered his new thesis title "Comparative study of political and social systems of Europe and Africa, from Antiquity to the formation of modern states". The new topics did not relate to ancient Egypt but were concerned with the forms of organisation of African and European societies and how they evolved. He obtained his doctorate in 1960.

== Career ==
Diop served as a member of the UNESCO International Scientific Committee for the Drafting of a General History of Africa in 1971 and wrote the opening chapter about the origins of the ancient Egyptians in the UNESCO General History of Africa (GHA). In this chapter, he presented anthropological and historical evidence in support of his hypothesis that Ancient Egyptians had a close genetic affinity with Sub-Saharan African ethnic groups, including a shared B blood group between modern Egyptians and West Africans, "negroid" bodily proportions in ancient Egyptian art and mummies, microscopic analysis of melanin levels in mummies from the laboratory of the Musée de L'Homme in Paris, primary accounts of Greek historians, and shared cultural linkages between Egypt and Africa in areas of totemism and cosmology. At the symposium Diop's conclusions were met with an array of responses, from strong objections to enthusiastic support.

Specific areas of disagreement at the 1974 symposium related to his hypothesis that earliest Nile Valley population were ethnically homogeneous from the Neolithic times to the Persian invasion and the valley was populated uniformly by a movement of black people from south to north. In the view of Egyptian scholar and editor of GHA Volume II, Gamal Mohktar, while acknowledging that Upper Egypt and Nubia held "similar ethnic composition" with comparable material cultures, found it highly doubtful that the earliest inhabitants who introduced civilization into the Nile Valley "ever belonged to one single, pure race". Several other participants at the symposium adhered to the view that the earliest population in Egypt largely originated in the Sahara but featured people from south and north of the region that were differentiated by their colour.

== Reception ==
Diop's work has been both extensively praised and extensively criticized by a variety of scholars.

=== Positive reception ===
African-American historian John Henrik Clarke called Diop "one of the greatest historians to emerge in the African world in the twentieth century", noting that his theoretical approach derived from various disciplines, including the "hard sciences". Clarke further added that his work, The African Origin of Civilization: Myth or Reality, challenged contemporary attitudes "about the place of African people in scholarly circles around the world" and relied upon "historical, archaeological and anthropological evidence to support his thesis". Clarke later summarised that Diop contributed to a new "concept of African history" among African and African-American historians.

Biological anthropologist S. O. Y. Keita (né J. D. Walker) contended that "his views, or some of them, have been seriously misrepresented" and argued that there was linguistic, anthropological and archaeological evidence that supported Diop's views, as well as stating: "Diop, though he did not express it clearly, thought in terms of biogeography and biohistory for his definitions. He also defined populations in an ethnic or ethnogeographical fashion. Nile Valley populations absorbed 'foreign genes', but this did not change their Africanity".

Stuart Tyson Smith, Egyptologist and professor of anthropology at University of California, Santa Barbara, regarded Diop's The African Origin of Civilization, published in 1974, as "A highly influential work that rightly points out the African origins of Egyptian civilization, but reinforces the methodological and theoretical foundations of colonialist theories of history, embracing racialist thinking and simply reversing the flow of diffusionist models".

Guyanese educator and novelist Oscar Dathrone credits Diop as a "unique unifier" in countering the "built-in prejudices of the scholars of his time" and presenting a more comprehensive view of African historical development.

Bethwell Allan Ogot, a Kenyan historian and editor of UNESCO General History of Africa Volume 5, stated that "Cheikh Anta Diop wrested Egyptian civilization from the Egyptologists and restored it to the mainstream of African history".

Esperanza Brizuela Garcia, professor of history, wrote that Diop "was most persuasive among intellectuals of African descent in the diaspora" and was among Afrocentric scholars who had criticised the omission of Africa in the works of world historians. Garcia also added that Diop's work The African Origin of Civilization best represented "Afrocentric critique" but "it does so without a serious engagement with the diversity and complexity of the African experience and offers only a limited challenge to the Eurocentric values it aims to dislodge".

Nigerian historian Toyin Falola called Diop's work "passionate, combative, and revisionist" and "demonstrated the black origins of Egyptian civilisation" in his view.

Firinne Ni Chreachain, an academic in African literature, described Diop as "one of the most profoundly revolutionary thinkers francophone Africa had produced" in the twentieth century and his radio-carbon techniques had "enabled him to prove, on the contrary to the claims of European Egyptologists, many of the ruling class of ancient Egypt whose achievements Europeans revered had been black Africans".

Helen Tilley, associate professor of history at Northwestern University, noted that the academic debates over The African Origin of Civilization still continued but that the "more general points that Cheikh Anta Diop" sought to establish "have become commonplace" and "no one should assume a pure lineage" can be attributed to "any intellectual genealogy because entanglements, appropriations, mutations and dislocations have been the norm, not the exception".

Dawne Y. Curry, Associate Professor of History and Ethnic Studies stated that "Diop's greatest contribution to scholarly endeavours lies in his tireless search for physiological and genetic evidence to support his thesis. Using mummies, bone measurements and blood types to determine age and evolution, Diop revolutionized scientific enquiry" but she noted that his message was not initially well-received but "more and more scholarship began to support Diop's conclusions, earning him international acclaim".

Josep Cervello Autuori, Associate Professor and Lecturer of Egyptology, assessed the cultural tradition established by Diop and noted that "the West had failed to consider its contributions, sometimes ignoring them completely, and sometimes considering them as the fruits of the socio-political excitement in the era of African independence". Autuori argued that the academic contributions of Diop should be recognised as "a recontextualisation and a rethinking of the Pharaonic civilisation from an African perspective" due to the continued parallels between Egypt and Africa.

Diop was awarded the joint prize of most influential African intellectual along with W. E. B. Du Bois at the first World Festival of Black Arts in 1966. He was awarded the Grand prix de la mémoire of the GPLA 2015. The Cheikh Anta Diop University (formerly known as the University of Dakar), in Dakar, Senegal, is named in his honor.

=== Negative reception ===
According to Andrew Francis Clark, associate professor of history at the University of North Carolina-Wilmington and Lucie Colvin Phillips, Professor of African Studies in the University of Maryland, "although Diop's work has been influential, it has generally been discredited by historians".

Robert O. Collins, a former history professor at University of California, Santa Barbara, and James M. Burns, a professor in history at Clemson University, have both characterized Diop's writings on Ancient Egypt as "revisionist".

Diop's book Civilization or Barbarism was described as Afrocentric pseudohistory by professor of philosophy and author Robert Todd Carroll. According to Marnie Hughes-Warrington, Diop's works were criticised by leading French Africanists who opposed the radical movements of African organizations against imperialism, but they (and later critics) noted the value of his works for the generation of a propaganda program that would promote African unity. Likewise, Santiago Juan-Navarro, a professor of Spanish at Florida International University described Diop as having "undertaken the task of supporting this Afrocentric view of history from an equally radical and 'mythic' point of view".

Historian Robin Derricourt, in summarizing Diop's legacy, states that his work "increased francophone black pride, though trapped within dated models of racial classification". Stephen Howe, professor of the history of colonialism in Bristol University, writes that Diop's work is built mostly upon disagreements with Victorian-era thinkers like J.J. Bachofen, Lewis Henry Morgan and Friedrich Engels, and criticizes him for "failing to take modern research into account."

Immanuel Wallerstein wrote that Diop's hypothesis in Antériorité des Civilisations Nègres: Mythe ou Vérité Historique? (1955) was "presented without supporting data", though had “the interesting effect of inverting Western cultural assumptions".

Kevin MacDonald, a doctor of archeology, was critical of what he saw as Diop's "cavalier attitude" in making "amateur, non-statistical comparison of languages" between West Africa and Egypt. MacDonald also felt that such attitude showed "a disrespect for the discipline" and for the "methodology of linguistics". He did however state that Diop had asked "appropriate and relevant questions" regarding possible relations between Egypt and the African continent beyond Nubia.

Historian Clarence E. Walker criticizes Diop's claim that Ramses II was black, as being without qualification, a futile exercise and "probably the single most unsuccessful effort on the part of a scholar to determine the racial origins of an Egyptian notable".

Mary Lefkowitz, scholar of Classics, accuses Diop of supplying his readers only with selected and, to some extent, distorted information. She criticizes his methodology, stating that his writing allows him to disregard historical evidence, especially if it comes from European sources.

Writing in response to Diop's book Parenté génétique de l'égyptien pharaonique et des langues négro-africaines, linguist Russell Schuh stated: "To take Diop's statements at face value, one would think no one had ever done any historical work on African languages before 1977. Looking at his bibliography, one finds no mention of any work in African historical linguistics. ... It may be that Diop did not know of these works or, on the other hand, that he chose to ignore them. Either way, the scholarship underlying his work is suspect."

Historian and classicist Frank M. Snowden Jr. states that Diop misinterprets the classical usage of color words, distorts classical sources and omits Greek and Roman authors, who he claimed make a clear distinction between Egyptians and Ethiopians.

=== 2025 UNESCO Multidisciplinary Review of the 1974 Symposium ===
In 2025, the UNESCO International Scientific Committee members for drafting the General History of Africa Volumes IX–XI reached the view that Egypt had African and Eurasian populations, with Upper Egypt now repositioned as the origin of pharaonic unification, with close genetic, linguistic, archaeological and anthropological affinities identified between the Upper Egyptian populations and Sub-Saharan groups. Anthropologist and Egyptologist, Alain Anselin, reviewed the Volume II edition and conclusions of the 1974 symposium, stating that the accumulated data had aligned with Diop's views. Specifically, this related to recent research over the last three decades which confirmed the early migration of Saharan and Southernly African populations to the Nile Valley. According to Anselin, the traditional view of a north to south orientation in Egypt had been displaced by the weight of evidence which favoured the preponderance of Upper Egypt. In his review section, Anselin referenced a number of anthropological, linguistic, archaeological and climatological data which had established close links between Upper Egyptian populations and groups across Sub-Saharan Africa. Other African scholars in the recent volume, including Augustin Holl, Olabiyi B.J. Yai, Yoporeka Somet, Martial Ze Belinga and Hamady Bocoum, made favourable references to the intellectual influence of Cheikh Anta Diop in explicating bias in Western scholarship and serving as an early figure in constructing a multidisciplinary approach, with a particular emphasis on a scientific methodology, towards African history. Somet also observed the value of Diop's prescient writings in recognizing the African origin of humanity and early Egyptian civilization by "the middle of the century".

== Publications ==
- Rousseau, Madeleine, and Cheikh Anta Diop (1948), "1848 Abolition de l'esclavage – 1948 evidence de la culture nègre", Le musée vivant, issue 36–37. Special issue of journal "consacré aux problèmes culturels de l'Afrique noire a été établi par Madeleine Rousseaux et Cheikh Anta Diop". Paris: APAM, 1948.
- (1954) Nations nègres et culture, Paris: Éditions Africaines. Second edition (1955), Nations nègres et culture: de l'antiquité nègre-égyptienne aux problèmes culturels de l'Afrique noire d'aujourd'hui, Paris: Éditions Africaines. Third edition (1973), Paris: Présence Africaine, ISBN 978-2-7087-0363-6, ISBN 978-2-7087-0362-9. Fourth edition (1979), ISBN 978-2-7087-0688-0.
- (1959) L'unité culturelle de l'Afrique noire: domaines du patriarcat et du matriarcat dans l'antiquité classique, Paris: Présence Africaine. Second edition (c. 1982), Paris: Présence Africaine, ISBN 978-2-7087-0406-0, ISBN 978-2-7087-0406-0. English edition (1959), The Cultural Unity of Negro Africa Paris. Subsequent English edition (c. 1962), Paris: Présence Africaine. English edition (1978), The Cultural Unity of Black Africa: the domains of patriarchy and of matriarchy in classical antiquity, Chicago: Third World Press, ISBN 978-0-88378-049-7. Subsequent English edition (1989) London: Karnak House, ISBN 978-0-907015-44-4.
- (1960) L' Afrique noire pré-coloniale. Étude comparée des systèmes politiques et sociaux de l'Europe et de l'Afrique noire, de l'antiquité à la formation des états modernes, Paris: Présence africaine. Second edition (1987), ISBN 978-2-7087-0479-4. (1987), Precolonial Black Africa: a comparative study of the political and social systems of Europe and Black Africa, from antiquity to the formation of modern states. Translated by Harold J. Salemson. Westport, Conn.: L. Hill, ISBN 978-0-88208-187-8, ISBN 978-0-88208-188-5, ISBN 978-0-88208-187-8, ISBN 978-0-88208-188-5.
- (1960) Les Fondements culturels, techniques et industriels d'un futur état fédéral d'Afrique noire, Paris. Second revised and corrected edition (1974), Les Fondements économiques et culturels d'un état fédéral d'Afrique noire, Paris: Présence Africaine.
- (1967) Antériorité des civilisations nègres: mythe ou vérité historique? Series: Collection Préhistoire-antiquité négro-africaine, Paris: Présence Africaine. Second edition (c. 1993), ISBN 978-2-7087-0562-3, ISBN 978-2-7087-0562-3.
- (1968) Le laboratoire de radiocarbone de l'IFAN. Series: Catalogues et documents, Institut Français d'Afrique Noire No. 21.
- (1974) The African Origin of Civilization: Myth or Reality (translation of sections of Antériorité des civilisations négres and Nations nègres et culture). Translated from the French by Mercer Cook. New York: L. Hill, ISBN 978-0-88208-021-5, ISBN 978-0-88208-022-2
- (1974) Physique nucléaire et chronologie absolue. Dakar: IFAN. Initiations et études Africaines no. 31.
- (1977) Parenté génétique de l'égyptien pharaonique et des langues négro-africaines: processus de sémitisation, Ifan-Dakar: Les Nouvelles Éditions Africaines, ISBN 978-2-7236-0162-7.
- (1978) Black Africa: the economic and cultural basis for a federated state. Translation by Harold Salemson of Fondements économiques et culturels d'un état fédéral d'Afrique noire. Westport, Conn.: Lawrence Hill & Co, ISBN 978-0-88208-096-3, ISBN 978-1-55652-061-7. New expanded edition (1987) ISBN 978-0-86543-058-7 (Africa World Press), ISBN 978-0-88208-223-3.
- UNESCO Symposium on the Peopling of Ancient Egypt and the Deciphering of Meroitic Script. Cheikh Anta Diop (ed.) (1978), The peopling of ancient Egypt and the deciphering of Meroitic script: proceedings of the symposium held in Cairo from 28 January to 3 February 1974, UNESCO. Subsequent edition (1997), London: Karnak House, ISBN 978-0-907015-99-4.
- (c. 1981) Civilisation ou barbarie: anthropologie sans complaisance, Présence Africaine, ISBN 978-2-7087-0394-0, ISBN 978-2-7087-0394-0. English edition (c. 1991), Civilization or Barbarism: an authentic anthropology Translated from the French by Yaa-Lengi Meema Ngemi, edited by Harold J. Salemson and Marjolijn de Jager. Brooklyn, NY: Lawrence Hill Books, c1991. ISBN 978-1-55652-048-8, ISBN 978-1-55652-048-8, ISBN 978-1-55652-049-5.
- (1989) Nouvelles recherches sur l'égyptien ancien et les langues négro-africaines modernes, Paris: Présence Africaine, ISBN 978-2-7087-0507-4.
- (1989) Egypte ancienne et Afrique Noire. Reprint of article in Bulletin de l'IFAN, vol. XXIV, series B, no. 3–4, 1962, pp. 449 à 574. Université de Dakar. Dakar: IFAN.
- (c. 1990) Alerte sous les tropiques: articles 1946–1960: culture et développement en Afrique noire, Paris: Présence africaine, ISBN 978-2-7087-0548-7. English edition (1996), Towards the African renaissance: essays in African culture & development, 1946–1960. Translated by Egbuna P. Modum. London: Karnak House, ISBN 978-0-907015-80-2, ISBN 978-0-907015-85-7.
- Joseph-Marie Essomba (ed.) (1996), Cheikh Anta Diop: son dernier message à l'Afrique et au monde. Series: Sciences et connaissance. Yaoundé, Cameroun: Editions AMA/COE.
- (2006) Articles: publiés dans le bulletin de l'IFAN, Institut fondamental d'Afrique noire (1962–1977). Series: Nouvelles du sud; no 35–36. Yaoundé: Silex. ISBN 978-2-912717-15-3, ISBN 978-2-912717-15-3, ISBN 978-9956-444-12-0, ISBN 978-9956-444-12-0.

=== Bibliography ===
- Présence Africaine (ed.) (1989), Hommage à Cheikh Anta Diop – Homage to Cheikh Anta Diop, Paris: Special Présence Africaine, New Bilingual Series N° 149–150.
- Prince Dika-Akwa nya Bonambéla (ed.) (2006), Hommage du Cameroun au professeur Cheikh Anta Diop, Dakar: Panafrika. Dakar: Nouvelles du Sud. ISBN 978-2-912717-35-1, ISBN 978-2-912717-35-1.
