= T. G. O. Gbadamosi =

Nigerian historian

Chief Tajudeen Gbadamosi
- Born: 15 June 1939 (age 87); Ondo, Nigeria
- Awards: Long Service Award, University of Lagos, Nigeria, 2002; Fulbright Scholar, 2005

Academic work
- Discipline: History, Islamic history, Nigerian history
- Institutions: University of Lagos, Nigeria

Chief Tajudeen Gbadebo Olusanya Gbadamosi (also known as T. G. O. Gbadamosi, born 15 June 1939) is a Nigerian historian and retired academic, who was a professor of history at the University of Lagos, Nigeria. His areas of research include African history, Nigerian history, Yoruba history, and the history of Islam in Africa with a particular emphasis on Nigeria.

== Early life and education ==
Tajudeen Gbadamosi was born in Ondo State, where he attended Ondo Boys' High School from 1952 to 1956, before moving to King's College, Lagos, where he completed his secondary school education in 1958. He proceeded to the University College, Ibadan the following year, obtaining his bachelor's degree in history in 1962. He obtained his Ph.D. in History from the same institution in 1968, under the supervision of J. F. Ade Ajayi. His thesis was on "The Growth of Islam Among the Yoruba, 1841–1908", which he converted to a book of the same title ten years later.

== Career ==
Gbadamosi began his teaching career as a foundational faculty at the newly established Department of History at the University of Lagos, Nigeria in October 1965. He rose through the ranks from then until he was appointed a full professor in December 1982. He was one of the earliest graduates of the Ibadan School of History, and was also a pioneer of the Lagos School of History that succeeded it.

From 2005 to 2006, Gbadamosi was a Fulbright Scholar-in-Residence at LeMoyne-Owen College, Memphis, Tennessee in the United States. He was a visiting associate professor of History at King Abdulaziz University, Jeddah, Saudi Arabia from 1979 to 1980; and a visiting scholar at the University of London's School of Oriental and African Studies (SOAS), London in 1977 and 1978.

Gbadamosi has been a member of various professional bodies, including the Nigerian Academy of Letters, Historical Society of Nigeria, Canadian Association of America Studies, African Studies Association, Nigerian Institute of International Affairs, Nigerian Institute of Management, Nigeria–Arab Association, and Counseling Association of Nigeria.

As a leading scholar of Islam in Nigeria, Gbadamosi has held various leadership positions within the community of Muslims in Lagos State including being president of the Muslim Community of Lagos State. He was a former Provost of the Ansar-Ud-Deen College of Education, Isolo, Lagos. As the National Education Secretary of Ansar-Ud-Deen Society of Nigeria, Gbadamosi was also an important contributor to the establishment of Summit University, Offa.

== Personal life ==
Chief Gbadamosi was married to the late Chief Tayiba Jumoke Gbadamosi (née Shadare), a member of an Isinkan royal family. Prior to her death, both Gbadamosi and his wife held titles in the Nigerian chieftaincy system.

His brother-in-law was the businessman Chief S. O. Shadare.

== Honours ==
In 2013, Gbadamosi was awarded the honorary citizenship of the State of Arkansas alongside six other Nigerians including Aliko Dangote, Rabiu Kwankwaso, Adebowale Adefuye, Julius Okojie and Akinwumi Adesina during a state dinner and awards ceremony of the Arkansas–Nigeria Economic Development Forum.

== Selected publications ==
- Aderibigbe, A.B. & T.G.O. Gbadamosi, A History of the University of Lagos, 1962–1987 (Lagos: University of Lagos Press, 1987)
- Gbadamosi, T.G.O. The Growth of Islam Among the Yoruba, 1841–1908. Ibadan History Series (Lagos: Longman, 1978).
- Gbadamosi, T.G.O. "Years of Development 1967–1975," in A History of the University of Lagos, 1962–2012, edited by R.T. Akinyele & Olufunke Adeboye (Lagos: University of Lagos Press, 2013)
- Gbadamosi, T.G.O. "Sharia in Nigeria: Experience of Southern Nigeria," in Understanding Sharia in Nigeria, edited by A.M. Yakubu, A.M. Kani & M. Junaid, 2001.
- Gbadamosi, T.G.O. "Confronting Reproductive Health within the Context of Islam," in Reproductive Health Within the Context of Islam, edited by 'Lai Olurode (Lagos: Irede Printers, 2000)
- Gbadamosi, T.G.O., & Junaid, M.O. “Islamic Culture and the Nigerian Society," in Nigerian Peoples and Cultures, edited by Akinjide Osuntokun and Ayodeji Olukoju (Ibadan: Davidson Press, 1997)
- Gbadamosi, T.G.O. "Islam, Trade and State in the Western Sudan: A Review of Approaches and Attitudes”, al-Fikr V, no.1 (1984): 1–16
- Gbadamosi, T.G.O. "Key Issues in Anglo-Yoruba Muslim Relations, 1884-1914," in African Notes IX, no.1 (1983): 9–22.
- Gbadamosi, T.G.O. & J. F. Ade Ajayi, "Islam and Christianity in Nigeria”, in Groundwork of Nigerian History, edited by Obaro Ikime (Lagos: Heinemann, 1980), pp. 347-66.
- Gbadamosi, T.G.O. "'Odu Imale': Islam in Ifa Divination and the Case of Predestined Muslim," Journal of Historical Society of Nigeria 8, no. 4 (1977): 77–93.
- Gbadamosi, T.G.O. "Patterns and Developments in Lagos Religious History," in Lagos: The Development of an African City, edited by A.B. Aderibigbe (Lagos: Longman, 1975), 173-196
- Gbadamosi, T.G.O. "The Imamate Question Among Yoruba Muslims," Journal of Historical Society of Nigeria 6, no. 2 (1972): 229–237.
- Gbadamosi, T.G.O. "The Establishment of Western Education Among Muslims in Nigeria: 1896–1926," Journal of Historical Society of Nigeria 4, no. 1 (1976): 89–115
- Gbadamosi, T.G.O., The Facts and the Legend of Al-Hajj Jimo Akitola Odutola: The Pioneer and Pacesetter (2005)
- Gbadamosi, T.G.O., The Ansar Ud Deen of Nigeria: Case Study in Islamic Modern Reformist Movement in West Africa (Lagos: Muslim Institute for Research and Planning, 1978)
- Gbadamosi, T.G.O., Historical Insights into Mother Alumni Association UIAA Lagos, 1958-1999 (Lagos: Spectrum Books, 1999)
- Gbadamosi, T.G.O., An African Beacon of Light: Ansar-ud-Deen Society of Nigeria, 1923-2013 (Lagos: Academy Press, 2013)
