= African historiography =

African historiography is a branch of historiography involving the study of the theories, methods, sources, and interpretations used by scholars to construct histories of Africa. Most African societies recorded their history via oral tradition, resulting in a lack of written records documenting events before European colonialism. African historiography has therefore lent itself to contemporary methods of historiographical study, the utilisation of oral sources, and the incorporation of evidence derived from various auxiliary disciplines, differentiating it from other continental areas of historiography due to its multidisciplinary nature.

Oral historians utilised various sources from their communities in crafting socially-consolidated histories which were then passed down through generations, with traditions serving as contemporary documents of messages from the past. Early written history about Africa was largely undertaken by outsiders, each of which had their own biases. Colonial historiography was Eurocentric and propagated racist theories such as the Hamitic hypothesis. African historiography became organised in the mid-20th century, and initially involved the refutation of colonial narratives. Nationalist histories sought to generate patriotism and sustain the multi-ethnic nation states, and African historiography saw a movement towards utilising oral sources in a multidisciplinary approach alongside archaeology and historical linguistics. Following growing pessimism about the fate of the continent, Marxist thought became popular, and contributed to a more critical study of colonialism. From 1981 UNESCO began publishing the General History of Africa, edited by specialists from across the continent. The 1980s saw universities struggle amid economic and political crises, resulting in the migration of many scholars (largely to the United States), and the discipline remains critically underfunded. Historians of Africa in the 21st century focus more on contemporary history than precolonial history, and are less ideological than their predecessors as the discipline has taken on a more pluralist form.

== The concept of Africa ==
There are vast amounts of ecological, cultural, linguistical, and religious diversity in Africa. Valentin Mudimbe notes that the idea of Africa was first made and used by non-Africans, particularly Europeans. The concept was appropriated by diasporic Africans during abolitionist movements in the 19th century as intellectuals sought an "African homeland", with their removal from the continent enabling them to view it as a whole. This planted the roots of pan-Africanist thought, however for most it was the shared experience of colonial rule and resistance to it that fostered a unified African identity.

== History ==
=== Traditional oral and early written history ===
In Africa, historiography has traditionally been undertaken by oral historians, who can range from professional specialists, such as the griots of West Africa, to amateur generalists, such as the bulaam ("men of memory") of the Kuba people. In accordance with African cosmology, African historical consciousness viewed historical change and continuity, order and purpose within the framework of human and their environment, the gods, and their ancestors. In African societies, the historical process is largely a communal one, with eyewitness accounts, hearsay, reminiscences, and occasionally visions, dreams, and hallucinations crafted into narrative oral traditions which are performed, sometimes accompanied by music, and transmitted through generations. In oral tradition, time is sometimes mythical and social, and ancestors were considered historical actors. (Note: In these cases, time's duration is not as it affects the fate of the individual, but the pulse of the social group. It is not a river flowing in one direction from a known source to a known outlet. Generally, traditional African time involves eternity in both directions, unlike Christians who consider eternity to operate in one direction. In African animism, time is an arena where both the group and the individual struggle for their vitality. The goal is to improve their situation, thus being dynamic. Bygone generations remain contemporary, and as influential as they were during their lifetime, if not more so. In these circumstances causality operates in a forward direction from past to present and from present to future, however direct intervention can operate in any direction.) Origin myths serve multiple purposes, helping to define a group's identity and forge sociocultural alliances, and provide the fulcrum on which a group's religious ideology rests. Traditions can be recorded in the form of epics (which use formal speech), narratives (everyday speech), and poetry (which tends to be formulaic and memorised word for word). They offer a socially-consolidated history, and often include the origins of institutions, embedding political authority. In stateless societies, clan histories predominated.

Some African writing systems have been developed or adapted in ancient and recent history. One of the most notable ancient scripts were the hieroglyphs of Ancient Egypt, which are attested to have been used for historical records from c. 1580 BCE. Following the discovery of the Rosetta Stone in 1799, historians were able to decipher hieroglyphs and access a new field of Ancient Egyptian history, however this work was undertaken predominantly by European historians. Some ancient external sources include Periplus of the Erythraean Sea (c. 230 CE) and Ptolemy's Geography (c. 140 CE). In Abyssinia, during the Aksumite period (c. 100 – c. 960 CE) histories were inscribed in Geʽez on stelae, thrones, and obelisks, and recounted a ruler's reign, recording various historical events such as military campaigns, diplomatic missions, and acts of philanthropy. From the 13th century, written imperial chronicles predominated, such as the Chronicles of the Wars of Amda Sion (14th c.). Following the spread of Islam, there are also plenty of written records in Arabic from Islamic scholars such as al-Masudi, al-Idrisi, Leo Africanus, al-Bakri, Ibn Battuta, and Ibn Furtu. They included observations of local societies, and sometimes utilised oral sources, embodying bias towards Muslim rulers while denigrating non-believers. As of 2005, Turkish-language sources remained largely unused as no-one had systematically explored the Istanbul archives, with the same being true of North African national archives. (Note: Furthermore, various traditional kingdoms are yet to publish their archives.) In West Africa and the Swahili coast Africans used Arabic or adapted the Arabic script into Ajami for their languages, and works were written in Akan, Fula, Yoruba, Hausa, and Swahili. Some were chronicles which literarily recorded oral tradition, such as the Kilwa Chronicle (16th c.), Timbuktu Chronicles (17th c.), Kitab Gonja (18th c.), Funj Chronicle (early 19th c.), and Kano Chronicle (c. 1880s).

European written records about the coastal regions proliferated during their exploration of Africa from the 15th century. They typically had strong prejudicial and Christian biases, and portrayed an exotic image of Africa, primitive and often at war with itself. Most 16th-century records were written in Portuguese, which the Portuguese strictly censored so as to protect their monopoly on African business from trading rivals, and most were destroyed in the 1755 Lisbon earthquake. Records through the 17th, 18th, and 19th centuries were mostly written in English, French, Dutch, and later, German. Authors aimed to promote trade, and so included information on trade goods, routes, markets, control of trade, sources of supply and production techniques etc. (important for economic history). Some historical works include Job Ludolf's Historia aethiopica (1681), Silva Corrêa's Historia de Angola (1782), and Archibald Dalzel's History of Dahomy (1793). There are also sources from European Christian missionaries (especially in the 19th century). However reporting on African traditional religions was poor, and authors often sought to 'expose' perceived 'errors' and 'barbarisms'. A minority of authors learnt African languages and made meaningful records important for social history. Amid the Enlightenment in the 18th century, European attitudes towards other cultures began to change. Hegel's now infamous statements in his Lectures on the Philosophy of World History (1837) encapsulated 19th-century orthodox European thought about African history.

=== Colonial historiography ===
Since most African societies used oral tradition to record their history, there was little written history of the continent prior to the colonial period. Colonial histories focussed on the exploits of soldiers, colonial administrators, and "colonial figures", using limited sources and written from an entirely European perspective, ignoring the viewpoint of the colonised under the pretence of white supremacism. Colonial historians considered Africans racially inferior, uncivilised, exotic, and historically static, viewing their colonial conquest as proof of Europe's claims to superiority, reinforced by social Darwinist principles. The topic was initially left to ex-members of colonial regimes who had a rapport with kings and elites, however imperial/colonial history later entered into the fringe of the profession. Some works include Charles Lucas's The Partition & Colonization of Africa (1922) and Gabriel Hanotaux's Histoire des Colonies Françaises et de l'Expansion de la France dans le Monde (1930). The most widespread genre of colonial narrative involved the Hamitic hypothesis, which claimed the inherent superiority of light-skinned people over dark-skinned people. Colonisers considered only "Hamitic Africans" to be "civilised", and by extension all major advances and innovations in Africa were thought to derive from them. Oral sources were deprecated and dismissed by most historians, who claimed that Africa had no history other than that of Europeans in Africa. Some colonisers took interest in the other viewpoint and attempted to produce a more detailed history of Africa using oral sources and archaeology, however they received little recognition at the time. The liberal tradition, championed by figures such as William Miller Macmillan, sought to criticise colonialism and racial segregation. The 1940s and '50s saw the study of African history split from colonial history, as institutions were set up such as the School of Oriental and African Studies by the University of London, producing a new generation of Africanists.

Some indigenous works by local historians during this period include Carl Christian Reindorf's The History of the Gold Coast and Asante (1895), Samuel Johnson's History of the Yorubas (w. 1897, p. 1921), (Note: Samuel Johnson explained himself as writing from "a purely patriotic motive, that the history of our fatherland might not be lost in oblivion, especially as our old sires are fast dying out. Educated natives of Yoruba are well acquainted with the history of England and with that of Rome and Greece, but of the history of their own country they know nothing whatever.") Apollo Kaggwa's The Kings of Buganda (1901), Musa Kamara's Zuhūr al-Basātīn (w. 1920s), Jacob Egharevba's A Short History of Benin (1934), Akiga Sai's History of the Tiv (1935), Paul Mbuya's Luo kitgi gi timbegi (1938), Samuel Josia Ntara's Mbiri ya Achewa (1944/5), and John Nyakatura's Kings of Bunyoro-Kitara (1947). In North Africa, the 1930s saw indigenous schools of historians established in light of growing nationalist and modernist Islamic movements. The Uganda Society founded The Uganda Journal in 1934 which aimed to increase knowledge about Uganda and preserve oral traditions. There were various proto-nationalist historians who fiercely combatted notions of European superiority, such as A. B. Horton, E. W. Blyden, J. W. Sarbah, J. E. Casely-Hayford, and J. B. Danquah, however their works resembled propaganda and today hold less authority than some of those already mentioned.

=== Postcolonial historiography ===
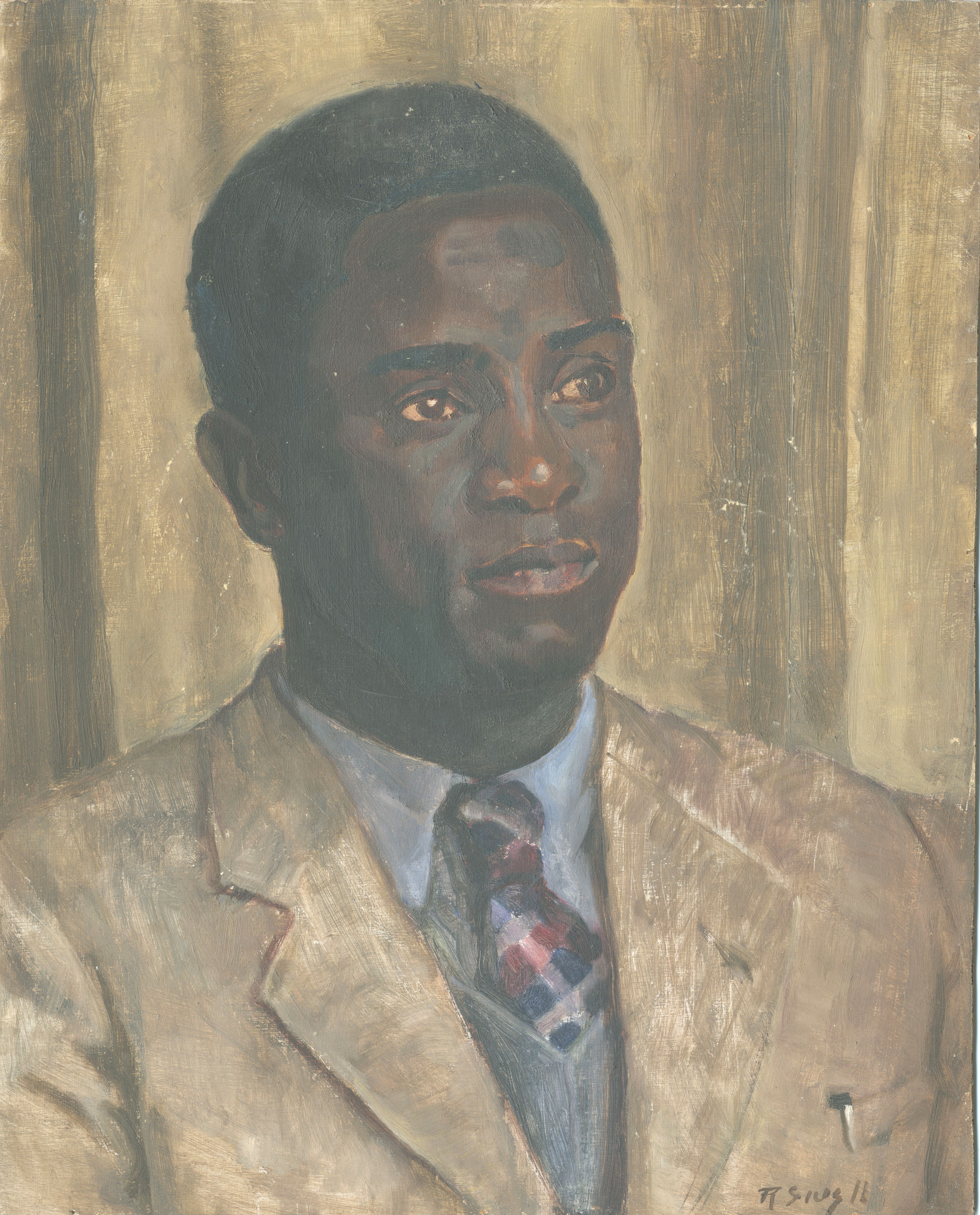
Oil portrait of Kenneth Dike, sometimes called the "father of modern African historiography"

The struggles for independence in the 1950s and '60s were mirrored by a movement towards decolonising African history. The new African elite now had the daunting task of achieving in the historical field what they had done in the political one. Historians' post-colonial works were characterised by their nationalism and Afrocentrism, aiming to reverse colonial thought and refute colonial narratives which degraded their culture. At the time, many did not think African history was possible and it was common for enthusiasm to be dismissed. The period saw a methodological revolution regarding the unprecedented widespread use of oral sources, alongside auxiliary disciplines.

In the mid-20th century, members of the Ibadan School of History in Nigeria, led by Kenneth Dike and Jacob Ade Ajayi, pioneered a new methodology of reconstructing African history using archives supplemented with oral traditions, destabilising the notion that Africa's history was essentially its interactions with Europeans. Other influential schools on the continent included the Legon School in Ghana which published on Akan history, and the Senegambian Dakar School where Cheikh Anta Diop instigated an "intellectual revolution" against French Egyptologists by linking Ancient Egypt to "Black Africa". The Dar es Salaam School in Tanzania led by Terence Ranger aimed to show modern nation states as continuations of the African past, and Bethwell Allan Ogot pioneered writing about stateless societies. Africanists such as Basil Davidson, Roland Oliver, and Catherine Coquery-Vidrovitch also made important contributions. National Historical Associations were founded along with journals such as Journal of the Historical Society of Nigeria, Afrika Zamani, and Kenya Historical Review, accompanying the European journals Journal of African History, Cahiers d'Études Africaines, and later History in Africa. Works through the 1960s and '70s relied upon a wealth of data to conclusively prove that Africans possessed historical consciousnesses and conceptualised, preserved, and transmitted their history through oral tradition.

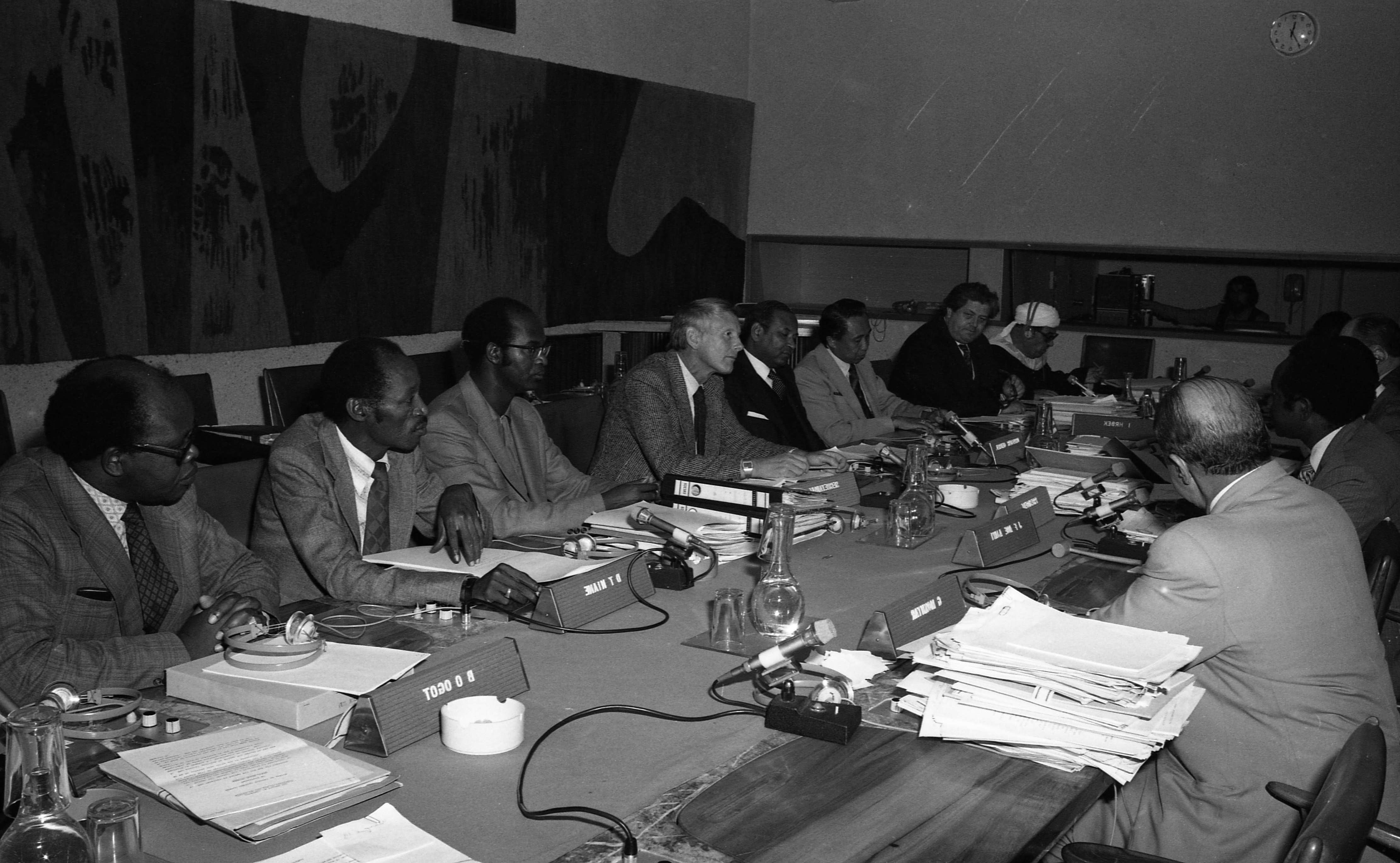
The International Scientific Committee for the Drafting of a General History of Africa in Paris, 1977

In 1961, Jan Vansina published Oral tradition in which he made the case for the validity of oral sources as historical sources, becoming one of the most influential works written about African history. Oral tradition continued to be heavily utilised in the reconstruction of African history over the next decade, despite a vigorous assault on the validity of oral sources by structuralists and some historians maintaining that African history prior to the 19th century was not possible. While a small number of historians dismissed their concerns, most accounted for them by applying a more critical approach in the analysis of oral sources, and consulted other disciplines such as archaeology and historical linguistics. This movement towards utilising oral sources in a multi-disciplinary approach culminated in UNESCO commissioning the General History of Africa, edited by specialists drawn from across the African continent, publishing from 1981 to the present. Meanwhile, North African scholars and intellectuals found themselves in an identity crisis, and gravitated towards the Arab/Islamic world. The General History of Africa and The Cambridge History of Africa's coverage of Ancient Egypt ensured it was viewed in an African context. Despite all this, in the process of refuting European myths about African history, nationalist historiography embraced Western views of what constitutes history, largely focussed on narrow political themes from above, and sometimes underplayed the impacts of colonialism.

The mid-1960s saw growing pessimism as various socio-political problems such as corruption, economic mismanagement, political instability, social malaise, and neo-colonialism endured, and the failure of African elites to deliver on their promises became apparent. Celebration of African achievement was replaced by fierce critique of the ruling elites and their neo-colonialist collaborators, and the term Africanist gained negative connotations. The dual problem of poverty and dependency bore a new Marxist historiographic ideology focussed on development. In 1972 Walter Rodney, building on previous works, introduced dependency theory to African historiography by publishing How Europe Underdeveloped Africa. It stated that Africa's natural development had been taken off course by the slave trade and colonialism into one of permanent dependency on outside forces. He also attacked modernisation theory, arguing that Africa must reject the international capitalist system in order to develop. This new school which combined Marxist historiography with dependency theory broadened the discipline's domain from nationalist historiography's narrow focus.

The onset of the "era of disillusionment" in the 1980s saw African universities struggle and fail amid economic and political crises, resulting in the migration of many great scholars. Some nationalist historians accepted responsibility for the model of the nation that they had projected, which supported nationalist regimes and idealised leaders and power rather than production and commoners. Works such as Lucette Valensi's Tunisian Peasants in the Eighteenth and Nineteenth Century (1985), Judith Tucker's Women in Nineteenth Century Egypt (1985), and Elizabeth Isichei's A History of African Societies to 1870 (1997) embodied a new impetus to write history from below.

=== Contemporary historiography ===
The widespread mood of introspection saw the formulation of postmodernist approaches to African historiography. The most notable work of this school was Valentin Mudimbe's The Invention of Africa (1988), which argued that African scholars derived their ideas and interpretations from Western academic discourse, and that they ought to reject the Western view of what constitutes scientific knowledge. Several scholars have questioned whether writing history based on Western epistemologies can ever be relevant and meaningful to African communities. The 1990s saw the abolishment of apartheid in South Africa, allowing Black students to attend formerly all-White universities and creating a crisis in South African historiography as Afrikaners struggled to come to terms with their history. The collapse of communism and failed socialist experiments in Africa produced revisionist responses from neo-Marxist historians. Local histories of clans, communities, villages, and administrative divisions flourished, often written by amateur historians for a local audience. Emphasis on the cultural embedding of knowledge has seen the domain of historical inquiry extend. Conversely, the turn away from material concerns caused the field of economic history to be neglected from the 1980s to early 2000s in spite of its enduring relevance. Major challenges persisted, such as "academic labour migration" (particularly to the United States) and overreliance on Western publishers inhibiting the growth of institutions in Africa.

In the present day, the discipline includes the various schools of thought in a pluralist tradition. The study of history in Africa is critically underfunded, with governments in the search for economic development favouring hard sciences and technology-based disciplines, consolidating brain drain. The new generation of historians are less ideological than their predecessors. In a bid to stay relevant they focus more on contemporary history and emphasise Africans' agency amid economic imperialism, neglecting early history, partly due to the complex and costly methodology required and the rapid dying of oral tradition. There has been an increased focus on ethnicity at the expense of social class. An important question to answer is what to do about the Western-derived nation states and institutions. The dying of oral tradition as elders and knowledge keepers have been gravely impacted by the COVID-19 and HIV-AIDS epidemics has generated urgency in applying community-based approaches to archaeological research. Histories are most often written in English or French rather than African languages, harming their accessibility to local audiences, with Jan Vansina opining that scholars seek approval from Western colleagues regarding technical standards. Funso Afolayan writes that African historians ought to prioritise African audiences. Despite efforts by multiple successive generations, scholars are yet to formulate an African philosophy of history, distinct and autonomous from the Western tradition.

=== Pathing the future ===
Crafted in 2013, the African Union's Agenda 2063 includes the production of an Encyclopedia Africana as one of its flagship projects, which aims to cover the "foundations in all aspect of the African life including history, legal, economic, religion, architecture and education as well as the systems and practices of African societies".

In Decolonizing African History (2024), Toyin Falola writes that Eurocentric education systems, and all Eurocentric institutions for that matter, initially introduced by colonial regimes as foci of cultural and ideological imperialism, must be Africanised, done in part by the incorporation and application of African epistemologies. He emphasises the role played by academia and supranational organisations in achieving this. He says that thought processes and patterns must be derived from African experiences and realities, and research carried out based on the needs and values of respective societies. He argues that oral traditions and early indigenous works should be heavily prioritised in the re-narration of African history. He says that this decolonisation would uncover African solutions to African problems and recover an African identity people can be proud of.

== Periodisation ==
Periodisation of African history was rooted in Eurocentrism, and initially centred around Africa's interactions with outsiders rather than on its internal developments. There is no agreed upon periodisation for African history, with the difference in temporal stages of state formation between parts of the continent generating disagreement. The Eurocentric concepts of the three ages and prehistory have received strong criticism, however they remain in use in African archaeology despite Graham Connah's effort of a "total history" in his work on Borno. Prehistory's traditional meaning of covering time up to the first written record (based on the old view that history cannot exist without written sources) has been deprecated, and historians now consider history to be based on evidence. Basil Davidson considered Africa's ancient period to be until 1000 CE, however Corisande Fenwick has posited the time of the Arab conquests (the 7th century) as an endpoint. Roland Oliver and Anthony Atmore proposed "Medieval Africa" as from 1250 to 1800 (having revised the start date back from 1400), and chose 1800 as the start date for "Modern Africa". Despite this, the Eurocentric terms "ancient", "medieval", and "modern" have been criticised as failing to represent African realities and capture its complexity.

== Oral tradition ==
Oral tradition is a form of human communication in which knowledge, art, ideas and culture are received, preserved, and transmitted orally from one generation to another. Most African societies used oral tradition to record their history. They generally have a reverence for the oral word, and have been termed oral civilisations, contrasted with literate civilisations which pride the written word. (Note: This characterisation has come under criticism by some African scholars, as it implies conflict between the oral and written. They instead contend that in reality, the characterisation is defined by the interaction between three ways of expression and diffusion: the oral, the written, and the printed word. Bethwell Allan Ogot notes that images of Africa composed by Western writers have often been in terms of "opposites" and how they differ from "us".) Oral traditions differ from written texts in that they are more roundly subject to the sensory experience of the listener(s). In African epistemology, the epistemic subject "experiences the epistemic object in a sensuous, emotive, intuitive, abstractive understanding, rather than through abstraction alone, as is the case in Western epistemology" to arrive at a "complete knowledge", and as such oral traditions, music, proverbs, and the like were used in the preservation and transmission of knowledge.

Historians collect and transcribe oral traditions via fieldwork, a practice that was initially foreign to historians who would usually spend most of their time sifting through archives and libraries. (Note: Tapes are preferred over transcriptions as they include more information about the interviewee's attitudes, such as laughter, hesitations, disagreements etc.) Vansina stressed the importance of publishing all recorded versions, fieldnotes, and information on the recording situation, however noted few do so. Most of the early tapes and transcriptions weren't submitted to public depositories, gravely impacting verifiability and nullifying future critique of interpretation. Researchers are often not fluent in the local language, and employ interpreters to translate questions and answers, harming the communication of meanings and understanding. Vansina differentiated between apparent meanings, intended meanings, and historical and present-day aims of the speaker's message, and said that interpretation requires a near-native understanding of the language and culture. Individualised interviews tend to be preferred because in group performances, which consist of the narrator and audience sharing and shaping the story, improvisation to entertain may be prioritised over accuracy of the tale. Occasionally, traditions are influenced by written works or incorporate recently acquired information, called feedback. As oral tradition rarely incorporates chronological devices, lists of rulers have been crucial to establishing dates and chronologies. This is done via generational averaging, with the most common length chosen for generations being 27 years. In some cases, a ruler or event is mentioned in contemporary written sources of whose dates are known. Some lists have been known to grow over time, harming their credibility. Barbara Cooper emphasises the creativity of the oral poet, and criticises the formulaic approach saying that the meaning sits in the performance, not necessarily captured through analysis of a transcription or interpretation of the words. Karin Barber said that oral traditions enact struggles and power, not only of historical individuals but also of the oral poet in that the oral 'text' only exists for the speaker and listeners. Jan Bender Shetler wrote that oral historians "reconstruct (rather than reproduce) oral traditions through the use of mnemonic systems, the central elements of which scholars of oral tradition call core images or clichés", and that the core images are the key to historical interpretation.

=== Debates ===
There have been various academic debates surrounding oral tradition. The first in the 1960s involved Jan Vansina and his students developing a rigorous approach to recover the past from oral traditions, counteracting scepticism and outright dismissal of the concept of African history. This was successful, despite not engaging and cooperating with African-American movements around oral history. The second focussed on the argument that oral traditions consisted of faithful memories of past events, which faced criticism from functionalists who argued that oral traditions function to reinforce present-day realities and give relatively little information about the past (called the "presentist critique"), (Note: Vansina himself considered all traditions to have a present-day function, otherwise there is no incentive for preservation.) and structuralists who emphasised the mythological and symbolic elements of oral tradition (called the "cosmological critique"). The cosmological critique was answered by Joseph Miller's The African Past Speaks (1980), in which historians emphasised the need to pay attention to how cultural understanding, political struggle, and memory shape traditions, and explore and analyse discrepancies between traditions which tend to signal problems, shifts, struggles, and loud silences. On the other hand, the presentist critique has proved pertinent and has been harder to dismiss. A folklorist critique of Africanist historians emphasised the role of the individual traditional oral historian in the crafting and preservation of oral traditions (and the possibility of infusion of autobiographical or experiential information, necessitating inquiry about the storyteller's life), rather than Africanists' focus on the influence of institutions, and the importance of an emic (insider) approach, rather than an etic (outsider) approach where the traditions are transcribed and interpreted from an outsider/European perspective.

== Auxiliary sciences ==
Due to the lack of written sources, African historiography has often consulted and incorporated evidence from various disciplines, including archaeology, linguistics, anthropology, geography, political science, economics, psychology, and literary studies. Confidence in the reconstructions of African history is driven in part by the interplay between disciplinary methods, in how they reinforce or challenge conclusions derived from one another. Historians of Africa aim to acquire basic understandings of these disciplines in order to use evidence from them effectively and critically.

=== Archaeology ===
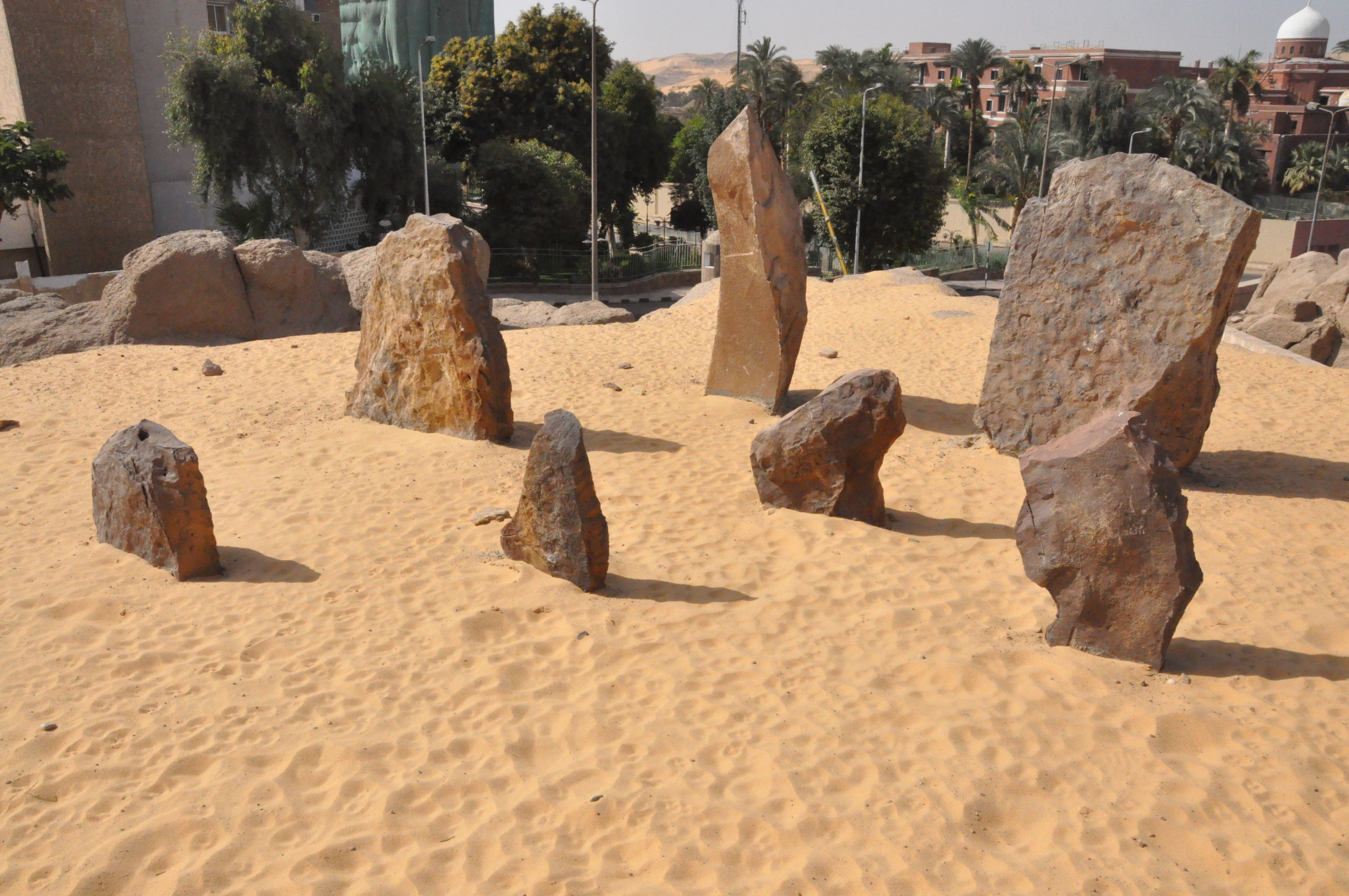
Megaliths from Nabta Playa, constructed by Neolithic populations, located in Aswan, Upper Egypt.

Archaeology is the study of past peoples and cultures through the recovery and analysis of material culture and the interpretation of it. Materials uncovered include human remains, tools, weapons, pots, structures, and religious or artistic objects, with interpretation of them seeking to reconstruct what often is a lost culture or civilisation. African archaeology has contributed the most to African history out of the auxiliary disciplines. Archaeology covers all time periods apart from contemporary times, and radiocarbon dating has been crucial in providing dates.

There are differing theories on how archaeological study should be undertaken. One is traditional culture history, which aims to describe and classify materials, and has been useful for providing chronological sequences. Another is processual archaeology which seeks to explain and understand cultural and technological change, viewing cultures as complex systems composed of economic, religious, subsistence, and technological subsystems, tailored to their environments and ecosystems. This approach has been particularly valuable for African archaeology with its focus on local factors and developments, rather than external factors. Criticisms of processual archaeology informed the formulation of post-processual archaeology, which views cultures as constituting expressions of thought, arguing that actions can only be explained by inquiry about ideas and intentions. This approach emphasises cultural organisation in the use of space and production of material culture, noting similarities between related cultures. Marxist narratives have been particularly influential in historical reconstruction in Eastern and Southern Africa. In cases where oral or written records are available, archaeology has helped to fill in the gaps. Oral traditions have commonly been used to locate archaeological sites. On the flipside, archaeology has also often served to verify and affirm oral sources, such as with the cases of Koumbi Saleh and Lake Kisale. Charles Thurstan Shaw and Merrick Posnansky pioneered including community members and oral repositories in archaeological research, which has proved pertinent and grown in popularity as oral traditions are rapidly dying. Post-depositional theory argues that information present in the archaeological record is always decreasing, thus advising urgency, which is especially pertinent due to the persistent underfunding and neglect African archaeology receives from governments and non-African specialists.

=== Historical linguistics ===
Historical linguistics is the study of how languages develop, involving their rate of change, divergence, borrowing, diffusion, relationships, and classification. It can establish a common origin for languages and estimate the time of their divergence (called a linguistic stratigraphy), which can be interpreted as the time a united people separated; glottochronology in particular has been useful for providing rarely-found dates. Languages are composed of all the necessary words to express knowledge, experience, and cultural practice by its speakers, and this vocabulary is a product of their history. A language's survival depends on its speakers maintaining a group identity or commonality, and so a long-lasting language maps onto a long-lasting societal continuity. Furthermore, a history of related languages is the history of related peoples. Historical linguistics provides evidence for cultural contacts, their physical environments, and contents of those cultures through the analysis of diffused features and reconstructed old vocabularies. By comparing the present-day vocabularies and phonetics of related languages, proto-languages can be reconstructed and one can identify meaning shifts which often resulted from historical developments, and loanwords which provide evidence for the nature of interactions between peoples. It can also account for the historical development of the people's traditional knowledge and religious beliefs.

Historical linguistics has contributed significantly to African history, second to only archaeology, however the vast area of African languages has received relatively little attention from experts. Linguistic reconstructions and deductions often attract scepticism and even controversy, and historians tend towards caution when using conclusions derived from them. One prominent case has been reconstruction of the proto-Bantu language and the Bantu expansion. Some works based on linguistic evidence include Jan Vansina's Paths in the Rainforests (1990), David Schoenbrun's A Green Place, A Good Place (1998), and Christopher Ehret's An African Classical Age (1998).

=== Anthropology ===
Anthropology is the study of humanity, including human behavior, human biology, cultures, societies, and linguistics, in both the present and past. It became a colonial science involving colonisers studying their subjects in order to gain a better understanding for greater control. Anthropology has helped historians better understand social and political relationships, historical events, and peoples' cultures. It can be crucial to understanding early political and economic structures, their evolution, the impact of colonialism, and their modern-day form. Understanding of political, economic, and kinship organisation can contribute to refuting narratives influenced by the Hamitic hypothesis.

Physical anthropology is the biological study of human and primate evolution, adaptation, and variation. It is best known for informing the theory of biological human races; while this has since been rendered obsolete, the issue of dividing humans into units of analysis remains contentious, with scholars favouring ethnicities or communities. Physical anthropology can provide evidence about health and disease, ways of life, diet, microevolution, and genetic relationships.

=== Geography ===
Geography is the study of the lands, features, inhabitants, and phenomena of Earth. It is split into human geography and physical geography, the latter of which has contributed the most to African history. It informs understanding of how a people's environment has influenced them and their social evolution, and environmental factors have been very consequential in shaping the continent's history. For instance, grasslands and woodlands in particular favoured population expansion. Botany is the study of plants, and is important for agricultural history. It can ascertain which plants were domesticated historically, and study human plant use, such as in traditional medicine. Most histories include a preliminary chapter on the "land and people", and include maps which aid understanding and give a real-world impression.

== Nationalist historiography ==
Nationalist historiography infuses historical writing with nationalism. Historical memory shapes nationalist sentiment on the basis of a shared past, creating a cultural identity, which in turn produces and legitimises nations. African nationalist historiography's primary mission is to generate patriotism and sustain the nation states. Crucially it aimed to reverse dehumanising colonial thought, especially the notion that Africans had to be divided into tribes and separated in order to be governed, instead promoting unity. Inter-group relations were prioritised, while ethnic rivalries were marginalised. It sought to uncover Africa's contributions to the world, emphasising leadership qualities and institutions in precolonial states, and their integrity and historicity prior to colonisation. It pioneered the use of oral sources, seeking their legitimisation, however largely used archives. In attempting to reverse the colonialist notion that colonisation was the most important phase of African history, which implied a "barbaric past" and "modernising present", nationalist histories often downplayed its impacts.

The onset of the "era of disillusionment", as economic development struggled in combination with various internal conflicts, brought tough challenges to nationalist historiography and saw it decline amid growing pessimism and nihilism. Some historians accepted responsibility for the model of the nation that they projected, which supported nationalist regimes and idealised leaders and power rather than production and commoners. Globally, nationalist historiography became unpopular within academic circles during the 20th century, with transnational histories more recently gaining in popularity. The new generation of African historians are less ideological, however the nationalist paradigm is still in use by some who confront neo-colonialist historians, and nationalist voices are included in the discipline's pluralist tradition.

== Liberal historiography ==
Liberal historiography aimed to help Africans reclaim their history and write history from an African point of view. The liberal tradition was pioneered by William Miller Macmillan throughout the 1920s, seeking to criticise racial segregation policies and include Africans as makers of history, contrary to the dominant white supremacist historical traditions of the time. He also advocated for social history of people's daily lives and concerns. Liberal historiography has been especially influential in South African historiography, with liberal historians often sparring with Marxist/radical historians. They developed the practice of oral history, often asking questions to do with social change. South African historiography, due to the country's political situation, lagged behind the rest of the continent in terms of decolonisation. The Oxford History of South Africa (1969–1971) was a landmark publication for liberal historians as the first comprehensive work on South African history that included Africans as agents of history, however its methodology quickly became outdated and, as was the liberal approach, it focussed on political rather than economic issues. Leonard Thompson pioneered the application of the multidisciplinary approach to South African history, including oral sources, in his Survival in two worlds: Moshoeshoe of Lesotho (1975). Liberal historiography's goals of African agency and the repudiation of colonialist myths had become outdated by the 1970s, and it declined with the advent of Marxist/radical historiography.

== Marxist historiography ==
Marxist historiography is the study and interpretation of history through the lens of Marxist theory, and involves analysing historical events in relation to social classes and materialistic phenomena. It maintains that history is shaped by the constant struggle of people against their material and social contexts. Marxist thought (or "radicalism") has been highly influential in African historiography. Marxist scholars largely focussed on colonial history, and emphasised the agency of Africans. Among African scholars, the ideas of Michel Foucault and Antonio Gramsci regarding the ideology of power, particularly the manipulation of cultural norms in the maintenance of power hegemony, were particularly influential. Marxist historiography greatly affected narrative writing and advanced a "cause and effect" interpretation of events, in contrast to them being viewed as a series of accidents or related to divine will. Differing from nationalist histories, radical histories shifted the weight of anti-colonial struggle from the elites to commoners.

While the school's generalisations led to the recognition of widespread patterns and the reinterpretation of events (such as the Fula jihads and Yoruba Revolutionary Wars), they sometimes inhibited the study of specific historical situations and often ignored cultural context. Despite this, Marxist approaches have been crucial in the development of a critical and holistic study of colonialism and Africa's relationship with the West. According to several scholars, they also solidified the point that European conquest and exploitation was the main cause of Africa's underdevelopment. The Marxist paradigm illuminated mass nationalism and militant resistance to colonialism, but also subscribed to a universal history of global capitalism. It has struggled to incorporate African thought, and narratives often found themselves at odds with the experiences and perspectives of the public.

== Postcolonialism and postmodernism ==
Post-colonialist historiography studies the relationship between European colonial domination in Africa and the construction of African history, and has its roots in Edward Said's concept of Orientalism. Western imperialism is viewed as the product of insatiable desire for power over the non-Western world, with this ambition to dominate extending to subjecting cultures to scientific scrutiny. As a result, knowledge produced from this endeavour is invalid as a projection of Western stereotypes and formulations. Another point made is the relativity of true knowledge and its cultural embeddings, discouraging external critique. While Orientalism's characterisation of Western imperialism has come under criticism, themes of relativism have continued in postmodernism.

Postmodernist historiography or deconstruction considers the past to be an ideological product of the present, thus reflecting present power relations and realities. The past is considered to be directly unknowable since traces of it are subject to people's perspectives and subjective interpretation, blurring the line between fact and fiction. This approach considers oral tradition to be contemporary ideas about the past. (Note: Jan Vansina wrote that it is reductive to view oral tradition as a product of only the past or only the present.) Deconstruction has faced staunch opposition in African studies, as it is perceived to dangerously depart from problems facing the continent and distract the intellectual agenda.

Critics argue that this particular movement towards an African alternative results in the disintegration of "African" into a vast multitude of cultural identities, having ramifications for pan-Africanism. Historians are challenged with focussing on cultural context while countering the criticism that subscribing to the European-derived idea of "Africa" might render the whole enterprise of African history worthless to the continent's future.

== Social history ==
Social history, sometimes called "history from below", is a field which aims to look at the lived experiences of the past, and uses a sociological (and occasionally ethnographic) approach to analyse and interpret historical events. Sources used include archival records, oral traditions, and oral testimonies. African social history more broadly has generally been neglected and left to social scientists, with historians usually focussing on small and familiar localities.

Oral tradition gives valuable insights to African perspectives and mentalities, which is crucial to social history. Oral sources collected via oral history also benefit the study of contemporary history by adding balance to official or canonical narratives from subaltern perspectives. One focus has been on commoners or agricultural history, which largely utilised testimonies. A renowned work is Charles van Onselen's The Seed is Mine: The Life of Kas Maine (1996).

=== Migration historiography ===
Migrations are a common theme in African history. They are split into voluntary migrations and forced migrations. The study of African migrations requires a multidisciplinary approach, and there remain big gaps in our knowledge. There has been sparse research into much of Africa's migration history. Michael McCormick's Origins of the European Economy: Communications and Commerce AD 300 - 900 (2002) researched cross-Mediterranean migrations, and included research on North Africa, but there has been no comparable study from an African perspective. The Bantu expansion has been debated over by historians, linguists, archaeologists, paleo-environmentalists, and evolutionary geneticists. Historiography of the Atlantic slave trade is by far the most developed sub-field on African migrations, however that of trans-Saharan and Indian Ocean migrations are growing.

=== Women's history ===
Women's history studies the role women have played in history, with a focus on women of historical significance and on how historical events affected women. It posits that women have been marginalised in the historical record, and aims to counter this. The three main paradigms in African historiography (nationalist, Marxist, and dependency theory) have neglected women's history, and works on general, economic, and even social history have had very little to say about women. Historians used to consider African women naturally inferior and helpless victims. African women's history grew rapidly from the 1970s, and has largely focussed on the colonial and postcolonial periods. There have been three waves, where the first focussed on economic production and agency, the second on the colonial period, and the third on gender, identity, and social struggle. An initial theory of modernity gradually liberating African women from tradition was rejected. It has studied urbanisation, informal and formal economic roles, motherhood, sexuality, reproduction, gender meanings, modernity, and public culture among others. It also considers the historical development of women's culture, including solidarity networks and autonomous social spaces. Political influence of women, whether as rulers or mothers and wives of rulers, is another focus. Works include Kathleen Sheldon's African Women: Early History to the 21st Century (2017), Iris Berger and E. Frances White's Women in Sub-Saharan Africa: Restoring Women to History (1999), Catherine Coquery-Vidrovitch's African Women: A Modern History (1997), and Cheryl Johnson-Odim's Women and Gender in the History of Sub-Saharan Africa (2004).

=== Urban history ===
Urban history studies the history of cities and towns, and examines the process of urbanisation. Scholars generally define African urban history as the study "of cities in Africa" rather than "of African cities", making them comparable to cities elsewhere with their Africanity considered secondary. Colonisers used to claim that Africa was mostly rural and historically absent of cities. Urban studies is typically very Eurocentric, and Africa has largely been neglected thus far, especially south of the Sahara. Scholars located in Africa are at a disadvantage, and often lack institutional access to the latest publications which tend to be expensive. Periodisation is demarcated into "precolonial", "colonial", and "postcolonial", due to colonisation gravely impacting the urbanisation process. Studies of colonial and postcolonial urban history tend to focus on dysfunctions, segregation, and marginalisation. Colonial cities mimicked those of industrial Europe by introducing capitalist systems of rent and administrative regimes, termed "modern", while pre-existing urban processes and structures, ranging from cosmology and family structure to construction materials, were termed "traditional", however postmodernist thought has largely dismantled this dichotomy. Local terms for settlements in general provide insight into how to approach the study of precolonial history. The widespread phenomenon of historical city-states in Africa requires a different approach to local politics, and favours comparability.

=== Art history ===
Art history is the historical study of the visual arts, and involves "identifying, classifying, describing, evaluating, interpreting, and understanding art products", as well as the study of the historical development of related fields, such as painting, sculpturing, architecture, and photography. From the late-19th century African art products started to appear in European museums, and curators developed systems for cataloguing and labelling them. It was only after the looting of the Benin Bronzes in the 1897 British expedition to Benin that Europeans realised there was art in Africa. The Bronzes appealed to their naturalistic tastes and the first scholarly work on African art history was Felix von Luschan's Benin Antiquities (1919). From 1905, German and French avant-garde artists recognised African art, and a wave of "delirious enthusiasm" ensued, caring only about form and not social context or meaning. Anthropologists entered the fray from 1925, and a specialised field had developed by 1945, followed by archaeologists' input from 1956.

In Art history in Africa (1984), Jan Vansina called scholars' treatment of African art history "shallow", and Henry Drewal considered it to have been neglected by scholars of African art. As of 2005 the field had no periodisation, and by and large African art was not treated as historically dynamic, compounded by the application of anachronistic ethnic group terms. The concept of "diaspora" has been applied to art products taken out of their social context.

== Economic history ==
Economic history is the study of history using methodological tools from economics or with a special attention to economic phenomena. There are three main schools of thought in African economic history: neoclassical, Marxist, and one centred on dependency theory. The leading journal is African Economic History, founded in 1976. From the 1980s to early 2000s, Africa rarely appeared in major journals on economic history. Since then, there has been a revival in the study of African economic history, mostly focussed on contemporary history. The discipline lacks input from African scholars, most of which are employed in the West due to a lack of opportunities at home, reducing the diversity of views and sidelining local perspectives. Some Western scholars engage in what A. G. Hopkins calls "neocolonial sholasticism". Gareth Austin criticised the sub-discipline for applying concepts predominantly derived from the European experience to African history, and said there needs to be more intellectual ambition. He also stressed the importance of comparative historical research in testing models proposed as universal, and noted that the immense diversity of the continent makes synthesising research into an "African model" challenging. Oluwatosin Adeniyi has lamented the lack of "African economics" as a distinct 'Africanised' discipline in the same vein as African art or African psychology.

Periodisation is split into four periods: the first is from the earliest hominids, through the Stone and Iron ages, and covers the development of agriculture; the second begins in the 16th century and revolves around the Atlantic slave trade; the third begins in the 19th century with the abolition of the slave trade and covers the colonial period; and the fourth covers postcolonial history from the mid 20th century to the present. Modernisation theory, which held that underdeveloped "traditional" societies had to be transformed into "modern" ones, dominated the discipline through the 1950s and '60s. It rapidly fell out of favour due to economic crises in the West and historical research uncovering contradictory evidence, creating a vacuum to be filled by dependency theory where capitalism became seen as the problem rather than the solution. Approaches from the Annales school gained currency in African historiography in the 1980s, however now they have mostly been absorbed into other schools.

=== Schools of thought ===
The neoclassical approach emphasises trade and exchange systems in African economies, with early pioneers being Kenneth Dike and A. G. Hopkins. Its initial efforts were to disprove Eurocentric ideas that economic dynamism, markets, and trade did not play important roles in precolonial Africa. Rational choice theory is central to this approach. The neoclassical school has received criticism for focussing too heavily on exchange and neglecting production.

The Marxist approach applies Marxist economic theory, specifically the theory of "modes of production". Leading scholars included Jean Suret-Canale and Catherine Coquery-Vidrovitch. The approach focusses on production, in contrast to dependency theory's emphasis on external trade. It considers multiple modes of production able to coexist within an economy and sought to identify indigenous modes of production, with the colonial period characterised by the domination of the colonial mode over precolonial or pre-capitalist modes. A. G. Hopkins says that its economic models "fitted awkwardly" if at all, and the class paradigm proved unfruitful.

Dependency theorists emphasise unequal exchange as a causal factor of underdevelopment, and apply world-systems theory. They posit that Europe created a peripheral form of capitalism geared towards exporting capital rather than cumulative reinvestment, resulting in a rich centre which accumulates wealth to the detriment of a periphery. Governmental policies informed by this seek to reduce or cut off relations with the West. Leading scholars include Immanuel Wallerstein, Samir Amin, Giovanni Arrighi, and Charles E. Alpers. This approach has been criticised for denying Africans agency.

New economic history applies econometrics to economic history, and utilises technology able to process large amounts of quantitative data. Prominent scholars include Daron Acemoglu, Simon Johnson, and James Robinson. They advance a "reversal of fortunes" theory, positing that as a result of colonialism, richer regions in 1500 became poorer due to the fashioning of extractivist and exploitative institutions, while poorer and less populated areas grew richer due to settler colonialism. This approach has been criticised for not taking into account historical changes over long periods, and for compressing history by presenting century-old events as causal to the present.

== Military history ==
Military history is the study of armed conflict and its impact on societies, cultures and economies, as well as the resulting changes to local and international relationships. Oral traditions rarely give insights into military history. African military history was neglected throughout the 20th century, in part due to colonial thought and wariness about embracing militarism amid various contemporary conflicts. Early on, it focussed on military resistance at the time of colonial conquest. In the 1990s social historians began to focus on the lives of soldiers and veterans, improving understanding of the colonial experience. It is only in the last decade that Africanists have begun incorporating this into a separate sub-discipline of military history. Michelle Moyd calls the representation of African conflicts as "mindless violence" or "irrational" racist stereotypes, while Charles Thomas and Roy Doron call this "the pernicious myth of anarchic violence". Moyd warns against grand narratives which reinforce these views, such as the trope that Shaka was responsible for the Mfecane.

Most historians follow Richard Reid in studying "African dynamic[s] in the use of force and violence in the continent's deeper history", which provides insights into state formation, slavery, and conflict with foreign entities. One focus is to study how people became soldiers. The study of slave revolts in the African diaspora can offer insights. The evolution of colonial armies into national armies can be studied to better understand civil-military relations. The incorporation of social history also involves the study of Africans' experiences of violence and conflicts. Feminist military history contributes to this, and Dahomey offers a rare opportunity to study women warriors. Rather than embracing militarism, historians aim to contribute to containing violence by furthering understanding of its origins, manifestations, and institutional dynamics.

== Environmental history ==
Environmental history focusses on the dynamic interaction between the environment (nature) and human societies (cultures), where environmental change is viewed as steps toward physical and mental domestication and conquest. "Declinist" views consider the impact of modernisation on the environment to be too costly and, without intervention, trending towards the death of nature and culture. "Inclinist" views emphasise small-scale development incorporating traditional knowledge and traditional resource management as the key to sustainability. Prior to the 20th century, nature was widely seen as the determiner of the vitality and culture of societies, now called environmental determinism, which was also a common view found in oral traditions. In the 1950s and '60s in Europe, environmental agency fell out of favour as the use of science was considered close to conquering nature, called cultural determinism. Modernisation theorists viewed scientific knowledge as a mechanism capable of conquering and replacing nature with artificial phenomena. Marxists considered capitalist market mechanisms destructive to moral economies and ecologies. The idea of a "wild Africa" has been soundly rejected.

The nature-culture dichotomy has seen strong criticism with some favouring a hybrid view, however it remains popular in African environmental history. Human and culture history originated in Africa and it therefore has unparalleled depth, with the continent having been very hospitable, however this is thought to have changed as the environment became hostile; scholars consider Africa to have been the first victim of the Great Divergence and its culture to have slowed. Some possible causes include the end of the ice ages, the drying of the Sahara, or the Little Ice Age. The slave trade and its chaotic end, immediately followed by colonisation, the World Wars, and the recent population boom have likely contributed. Researchers often attribute famines and epidemics to low domestication of Africa's environment. However Emmanuel Kreike says that domestication is a poor marker for development due to its Eurocentric scientific-evolutionary definition. "Environmental infrastructure" is when the environment is shaped by cooperation between humans and non-humans such that it sustains the life of both, which Kreike says is more applicable to African history. Conservation studies emphasises the closure of communal resources for indigenous peoples and power struggle between colonial governments and their subjects. Postmodernism had a big impact on environmental history, as it encouraged critique of colonial perceptions and the incorporation of ethnohistory and traditional knowledge to inform conceptualisations.

=== Animal history ===
Animal history aims to centre historical study on animals. It is very nascent, with regional societies only formed in the early 21st century. Historians of Africa have recognised animals as capable of producing change in human history, but specific focus on animals has been very rare. An early criticism of animal historians was regarding the ventriloquism of the animal, said to reveal more about the author than the animal, which historians now aim to avoid. The terms "animal-sensitive history" or "multi-species history" are preferred by some. The sub-discipline maintains similarities with various movements in African historiography aimed at recognising agency, and is sometimes incorporated into environmental histories.

== Afrocentrism ==
Following the early ideological traditions of Pan-Africanism (popularised by Marcus Garvey and W. E. B. Du Bois) and Négritude (advocated by Aimé Césaire and Léopold Sédar Senghor), in the second half of the 20th century African Americans became closely involved and took greater interest in the study of Africa. They posited that the project of African history ought to be tied to the notion of racial liberation from white domination. This led to the formulation of Afrocentrism, which sought to challenge Eurocentric assumptions and attitudes dominant in academia, such as the notion of universality in contradiction of differing ontologies and perspectives more relevant to a particular context. Essentially, it stressed the importance of centring analysis and explanation in African ideas, interests, and presuppositions. Relatedly, Afrocentricity, coined by Molefi Kete Asante, seeks to ground the study of the peoples of Africa and the African diaspora within their own historical, cultural, and sociological contexts. Afrocentrist histories are rooted in old pan-Africanist visions of racial unity and cultural diffusion, and consider Ancient Egypt as having played a central role in African history. Another idea espoused by Asante, building off of the work of Cheikh Anta Diop, is that Africa should use Ancient Egypt as its foundational source of scholarly inspiration, similar to the role Ancient Greece and Rome plays in European scholarship.

Afrocentrism is largely marginal to mainstream scholarship, and more closely resembles popular history. Its ideas and the discourse surrounding them have often attracted criticism and controversy. While most scholars recognise the need for African studies to be rooted in African thought, they have warned against usurping discredited notions of white supremacy with discourse of black supremacy. Afrocentrist histories remain popular in the African diaspora in the Americas amid an ongoing struggle for respect, equality, and empowerment in their respective societies, and are influential regarding the popular perception of Africa. They often ignore advances made in African historiography in the last half-century, and rely upon crude generalisations and clichés. Few African scholars have shown interest in the subject, indicating the irrelevance of racial discourse throughout much of the continent in the present day.

== See also ==
- Cradle of humanity
- Cradle of civilization
- List of historians of Africa
- Ethiopian historiography
- History of Africa
- African studies
- African philosophy
- List of kingdoms and empires in African history
- The Cambridge History of Africa, a multivolume history published 1975–1986
- General History of Africa, a multivolume history published by UNESCO from 1981–present
