= Murray Last =

British historian of northern Nigeria and medical anthropologist (born 1937)

Professor Murray Last
- Born: Denis Murray Last; 1937 (88–89)
- Other name: D. M. Last
- Occupations: Professor, historian, anthropologist

Academic background
- Education: University of Cambridge (BA); Yale University (MA); University of Ibadan (PhD)
- Thesis: A Study of Sokoto in the 19th Century, with Special Reference to the Waziris (1964)
- Doctoral advisor: Abdullahi Smith

Academic work
- Discipline: History, African studies, medical anthropology
- Institutions: Ahmadu Bello University; Bayero University Kano; International African Institute; University College London
- Main interests: History of northern Nigeria, Islamic history of West Africa, Hausa medicine
- Notable works: The Sokoto Caliphate (1967); The Importance of Knowing about Not Knowing (1981)

Denis Murray Last (born 1937) is a British historian and medical anthropologist, known for his pioneering research on northern Nigeria and the anthropology of medicine. He and Adiele Afigbo were the first two individuals to be awarded a PhD by a Nigerian university, completing his doctorate at University College Ibadan with research on the Sokoto Caliphate. His thesis was later published as The Sokoto Caliphate (1967), an influential work that reshaped understanding of 19th-century Islamic west Africa through its extensive use of primary sources, mostly written in Classical Arabic. Last is also recognised for his longterm ethnographic research on Hausa and Maguzawa medical cultures, introducing the concepts of "medical cultures" and "not knowing" in medical anthropology and ethnography. He served as sole editor of the Africa journal for 15 years (1986–2001) and is currently professor emeritus in the Department of Anthropology, University College London.

== Early life and education ==
Denis Murray Last was born in 1937.

Last graduated from University of Cambridge with a Bachelor of Arts degree in Classics in 1959. He then attended Yale University to study Chinese and African history for his master's degree. At Yale, he was introduced to African history by the historian Harry Rudin, known for his work on Cameroon. His master's thesis was a translation of a Mandinka biography of Samori Ture, the great anti-colonial commander and founder of the Wassoulou empire.

Following the Sharpeville Massacre in March 1960, anti-apartheid protests were held at Yale. In a letter published in the Yale Daily News, Last called for a boycott of South African goods in order to apply pressure on the apartheid regime.

== Career ==
=== Doctoral research and The Sokoto Caliphate ===
After graduating in 1961, Last travelled to Nigeria to pursue a doctorate in History at University College, Ibadan. There, his interest in the history of Northern Nigeria grew. During the early post-colonial period in Nigeria, the History Department at Ibadan became associated with what is known as the Ibadan School of history, a group of scholars who were critical of the 'Eurocentric perception of Africa' common during the colonial period and who instead primarily focused on African sources. At Ibadan, Last began learning Classical Arabic and studied under scholars like H. F. C. Smith (later Abdullahi Smith), Jacob Ajayi, Muhammad Ahmad al-Hajj and John Hunwick. Later in 1961, he accompanied Hunwick to Kano to catalogue the Emir of Kano's large collection of Arabic manuscripts at the Shahuci Judicial School library.

On the advice of his supervisor Abdullahi Smith, Last spent a year in Sokoto conducting research for his doctoral thesis titled "A Study of Sokoto in the 19th Century, with Special Reference to the Waziris". During this period, he lived in the compound of the Sokoto waziri (vizier) Muhammadu Junaidu, who granted him access to the over 300 Arabic manuscripts and 600 official letters that were kept in his family library. His research was initially funded by the Leverhulme Trust and later by the Nigerian Federal Ministry of Education. Last completed his thesis in 1964 and, in November that year, he and Adiele Afigbo became the first two individuals to be awarded PhDs by a Nigerian university, both awarded by the University College Ibadan.

The thesis was later published in 1967 with the title The Sokoto Caliphate, which he dedicated to Waziri Junaidu. The work became influential in the historiography of the Sokoto Caliphate and 19th century Central Sudan. It also popularised the term "Sokoto Caliphate" as a label for the state established by Usman dan Fodio following his jihad. The term was first introduced by Last and Smith and has since become the standard designation. Between 1965 and 1967, Last helped establish the Northern History Research Scheme at Ahmadu Bello University, Zaria. As part of the project, he assisted in collecting and cataloguing more than 10,000 manuscripts, mostly in Arabic, as well as approximately one hundred in Fulfulde from Adamawa.

Last is regarded as a leading authority on the history and anthropology of Islam in northern Nigeria.

=== Medical anthropology and Hausa medicine ===
During his research in Northern Nigeria, Last took up an interest in traditional Hausa medicine and later retrained as a medical anthropologist. His interest in that area was initially sparked by his time in Sokoto, where he assisted the Assistant District Officer Dahiru Modibbo Girei in deciding "who was mad in the prison and who was not mad", which he later credited as his introduction to traditional notions of madness.

In the late 1960s, Last began his research by first visiting the market town of Dankanjiba in the Malumfashi district (in present-day Katsina State), where he collected family medical histories. He found that he was only allowed to interview the fathers, which he attributed to the strong Islamic culture of the town. He then surveyed a pastoralist Fulani camp in the district, but again found that he was not able to speak to the women and children. Convinced that his study required a place less influenced by Islamic or Christian proselytising, he moved in 1969 to a Maguzawa (Hausa animist) village about fifteen miles from Malumfashi town. There, he lived among farming families and studied what he later called their "medical culture". His fieldwork was intended in part to help staff at the newly established Ahmadu Bello University Teaching Hospital better understand what their patients "felt themselves".

In a paper first published in 1981 and later reprinted as The Importance of Knowing about Not Knowing, Last questioned the assumption that every society has a coherent and internally consistent "medical system". He instead used the broader term "medical culture" to describe all medical activities within a particular place to distinguish it from the more narrow idea of a medical system. Drawing on his research in Malumfashi, he argued that medical knowledge was unevenly distributed and often layered, becoming less certain the deeper one inquired. He suggested that under certain conditions not knowing, or not caring to know, could become institutionalised as part of a medical culture. Rather than viewing different forms of healing as separate and competing systems, he found at Malumfashi a hierarchy of medical practices which ranged from "western" medicine to Islamic medicine and local Maguzawa healing. He called this a "nonsystem", in which secrecy, scepticism, and uncertainty shaped medical practice. Last's 1981 essay has been regarded as an influential contribution to African studies and medical anthropology. Last continued to visit the Maguzawa community for more than five decades, documenting changes in its medical culture as a result of changing state health policies and demographic shifts, with much of the population now Muslim.

In 2007, a collection of essays written in his honor, On Knowing and Not Knowing in the Anthropology of Medicine, was published and edited by another British anthropologist, Roland Littlewood.

Last was sole editor of the International African Institute's journal Africa for 15 years (1986–2001). He is currently professor emeritus in the Department of Anthropology at the University College London.
