= Toyin Falola =

Nigerian historian (born 1953)

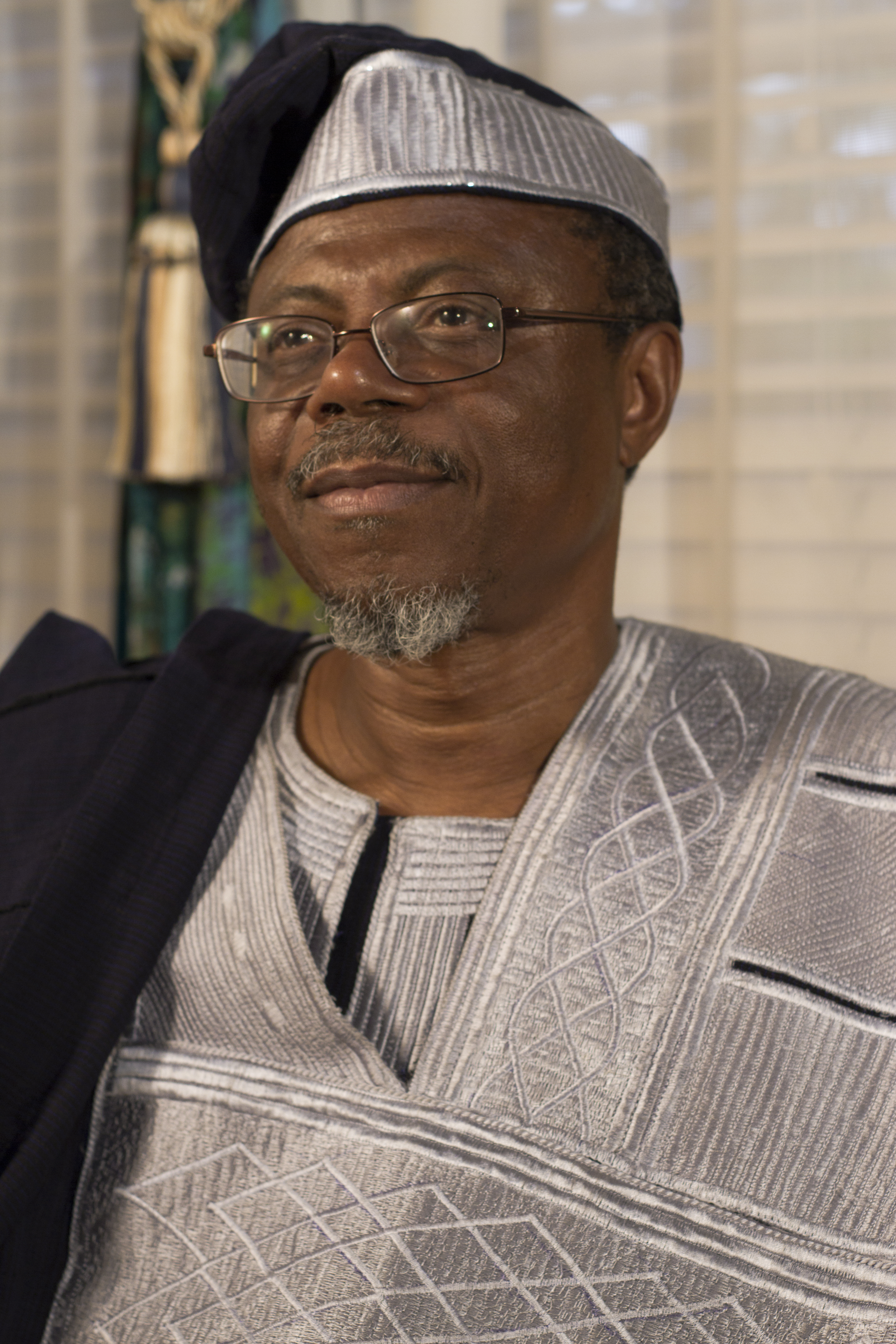
- Born: 1 January 1953 (age 73); Ibadan, Oyo, Nigeria
- Education: University of Ife; University of Ibadan
- Occupations: Historian and university professor
- Known for: Historiography in Africa
- Scientific career
- Fields: African History
- Workplaces: University of Texas, Obafemi Awolowo University
- Website: toyinfalolanetwork.org

Toyin Omoyeni Falola (born 1 January 1953) is a Nigerian historian and professor of African studies. Falola is a Fellow of the Historical Society of Nigeria and of the Nigerian Academy of Letters, and has served as the president of the African Studies Association. He is currently the Jacob and Sanger Mossiker Chair in the Humanities at the University of Texas at Austin.

== Biography ==
=== Early life and education ===
Falola was born on 1 January 1953, in Ibadan, Nigeria. He earned his B.A. and Ph.D. in History (1981) at the University of Ife, Ile-Ife (now Obafemi Awolowo University), in Nigeria. In December 2020, he earned an academic D.Litt. in Humanities from the University of Ibadan.

=== Academic career ===
Falola began his academic career as a schoolteacher in Pahayi, Ogun State, in 1970, and by 1981 he was a lecturer at the University of Ife. He joined the faculty at the University of Texas at Austin in 1991, and has also held short-term teaching appointments at the University of Cambridge in England, York University in Canada, Smith College, Massachusetts, in the United States, The Australian National University in Canberra, Australia, and the Nigerian Institute of International Affairs in Lagos, Nigeria.

==== Research and pedagogy ====
The primary focus of Falola's research is African history since the 19th century, in the tradition of the Ibadan School. His geographic areas of interest include Africa, Latin America and the United States; and his thematic fields include Atlantic history, diaspora and migration, empire and globalization, intellectual history, international relations, religion and culture.

Falola is the author and editor of more than one hundred books, as well as the general editor of the Cambria African Studies Series (Cambria Press).

Recent courses he has taught include "Introduction to Traditional Africa", an interdisciplinary course on the peoples and cultures of Africa, designed for students with varied backgrounds in African Studies, and "Epistemologies of African/Black Studies", a course on the rise and evolution of African/Black Studies, with a focus on pedagogy, methodology, and the historical development of scholarship in the field.

=== Academic honours and awards ===
Falola has received honorary doctorates, lifetime career awards and honors in various parts of the world, including:

- Emeritus Professor of Humanities, Lead City University Ibadan
- The Lincoln Award,
- Nigerian Diaspora Academic Prize,
- Cheikh Anta Diop Award,
- Amistad Award,
- SIRAS Award for Outstanding Contribution to African Studies,
- Africana Studies Distinguished Global Scholar Lifetime Achievement Award,
- Fellow of the Nigerian Academy of Letters,
- Fellow of the Historical Society of Nigeria, and The Distinguished Africanist Award.
- He has also received honorary degree of doctors of letters from thirteen universities, including the Federal University of Agriculture, Abeokuta (FUNAAB) during FUNAAB 26th convocation ceremony in November 2018, and Babcock University, in Ilishan-Remo.

Falola served as the president of the African Studies Association in 2014 and 2015.

== Books ==
- Islam and Christianity in West Africa. With Biodun Adediran (1983), ISBN 978-978-136-043-5.
- The Military in Nineteenth Century Yoruba Politics (1984), ISBN 978-978-136-064-0.
- The Rise and Fall of Nigeria's Second Republic, 1979–1984. With Julius Ihonvbere (1985), ISBN 978-0-86232-380-6.
- Transport Systems in Nigeria. Edited (1986), ISBN 978-0-915984-67-1.
- Britain and Nigeria: Exploitation or Development? Edited (1987). ISBN 978-0-86232-304-2.
- Modern Nigeria: a tribute to G. O. Olusanya. Edited (1990), ISBN 978-978-30553-1-5.
- Yoruba Historiography (1991), ISBN 978-0-942615-10-4.
- Rural Development Problems in Nigeria. Edited with S. A. Olanrewaju (1992), ISBN 978-1-85628-240-6.
- The Political Economy of Health in Africa. Edited with Dennis Hyavyar (1992), ISBN 978-0-89680-168-4.
- Warfare and Diplomacy in Precolonial Nigeria: Essays in honor of Robert Smith. With Robin Law (1992), ISBN 978-0-942615-14-2.
- Pawnship in Africa: debt bondage in historical perspective. Edited with Paul. E. Lovejoy (1994), ISBN 978-0-8133-8457-3.
- Religious Militancy and Self-assertion: Islam and Politics in Nigeria. With M. H. Kukah (1996), ISBN 978-1-85972-474-3.
- Violence in Nigeria: the crisis of religious politics and secular ideologies (1998), ISBN 1-58046-018-6.
- Yoruba Gurus: Indigenous Production of Knowledge in Africa (1999), ISBN 0-86543-698-3.
- Culture, Politics and Money among the Yorubas. With Akanmu Adebayo (2000), ISBN 978-1-4128-2111-7.
- African Politics in Postimperial Times, with Richard L. Sklar (2001), ISBN 0-86543-985-0.
- Culture and Customs of the Yoruba. With Akintunde Akinyemi (2001), ISBN 978-1-943533-18-3.
- Nationalism and Africa Intellectuals (2001), ISBN 1-58046-085-2.
- Yoruba Warlords of the Nineteenth Century, with D. Oguntomisin and G. O. Oguntomisin (2001), ISBN 978-0-86543-784-5.
- Culture and Customs of Ghana. With Steven J. Salm (2002), ISBN 0-313-32050-0.
- The Transformation of Nigeria: Essays in honor of Toyin Falola. (2002), ISBN 0-86543-998-2.
- Key Events in African History: A Reference Guide. (2002), ISBN 978-0313361227
- Pawnship, Slavery, and Colonialism in Africa, with Paul E. Lovejoy (2003), ISBN 1-59221-039-2.
- The Foundations of Nigeria: Essays in honor of Toyin Falola. Edited by Adebayo Oyebade (2003), ISBN 1-59221-120-8.
- African Urban Spaces in Historical Perspective, with Steven J. Salm (2005), ISBN 0-89089-558-9.
- Yoruba Creativity: Fiction, Language, Life and Songs, with Ann Genova (2005), ISBN 1-59221-336-7.
- Mouth Sweeter than Salt: An African Memoir (2005), ISBN 978-0-472-03132-0.
- A History of Nigeria, with Matthew M. Heaton (2008), ISBN 978-0-521-86294-3.
- The Atlantic World, 1450–2000, with Kevin David Roberts (2008), ISBN 0-253-21943-4.
- The Power of African Cultures (2008), ISBN 978-1-58046-297-6.
- Historical Dictionary of Nigeria. With Ann Genova (2009). ISBN 978-0-8108-6316-3.
- Narrating War and Peace in Africa. Edited with Hetty Ter Haar (2010), ISBN 978-1-58046-330-0.
- Africa, Empire and Globalization. Essays in Honor of A. G. Hopkins, with Emily Brownell. Carolina Academic Press, Durham, NC (2011), ISBN 978-1-59460-352-5.
- Counting the Tiger's Teeth: An African Teenager's Story (2014), ISBN 978-0-472-11948-6.
- Africa: An Encyclopedia of Culture and Society 3 vols. Edited with Daniel Jean-Jacques (2015), ISBN 978-1-59884-666-9.
- Encyclopedia of the Yoruba. With Akintude Akinyemi (2016), ISBN 978-0-253-02156-4.
- Decolonizing African Knowledge: Autoethnography and African Epistemologies (2022), ISBN 978-1-316-51123-7.
- African Spirituality, Politics, and Knowledge Systems: Sacred Words and Holy Realms. (2022), ISBN 9781350271968.
- A History of West Africa. (2023), ISBN 9781003801665
- African Memoirs and Cultural Representations. (2023), ISBN ISBN 9781839987755.
- Global Yorùbá: Regional And Diasporic Networks. (2024), ISBN 9780253070579.

== TOFAC ==
In Nigeria, there is a conference named after Toyin Falola by the Ibadan Cultural Studies Group; a group chaired by Professor Ademola Dasylva. The first Toyin Falola International Conference on Africa and the African Diaspora (TOFAC) was held in 2011 at the University of Ibadan. The second was hosted in Lagos by the Centre for Black African Arts and Civilization (CBAAC) under the watch of the director general of the centre Professor Tunde Babawale.

== Additional reading ==
- Adeboye, O. A. Toyin Falola and Yoruba Historiography: The Man, The Mask, The Muse. Carolina Academic Press, Durham, 2010.
- Bangura, Abdulkarim. Toyin Falola and African Epistemologies. Springer, 2015.
