= Adiele Afigbo =

Nigerian historian (1937–2009)

Adiele Eberechukwu Afigbo
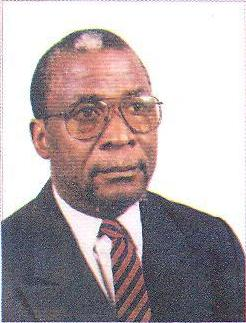
- Born: 22 November 1937; Ihube, Okigwe, Nigeria
- Died: 9 March 2009 (aged 71); Enugu, Enugu State, Nigeria

Academic background
- Education: University of Ibadan

Academic work
- Discipline: African History
- Institutions: University of Ibadan, Ibadan (1964–1966); University of Nigeria Nsukka (1966–1992); Alvan Ikoku College of Education, Owerri, (1993–1998); Abia State University, Uturu, (1998–2003); Ebonyi State University, Abakaliki, (2004–2009)

Adiele Eberechukwu Afigbo (22 November 1937 – 9 March 2009) was a Nigerian historian known for the history and historiography of Africa, more particularly Igbo history and the history of Southeastern Nigeria. Themes emphasised include pre-colonial and colonial history, inter-group relations, the Aro and the slave trade, the art and science of history in Africa, and nation-building.

Afigbo took up his career as a historian in the 1950s with the celebrated Ibadan School of History, which for about three decades was the most prominent school of history in Africa. He became a prominent member of that school, which devoted its time to demonstrating the need for African history and historiography as specific genres of the world history. In pursuing the mission of this school through teaching and scholarly work, Afigbo produced works that established reconstructionist history, of African historical methodologies, and links between history and statecraft. He gave rein to eclecticism of sources and methods, using as the occasion demands and warrants elements from myth, oral sources, from archaeology, linguistics, material artefacts and written sources. In the last analysis he defined a historian as a clinical student of human experience who seeks to tell the story as it is and to explain it.

== Early life and education ==
Afigbo was born at Ihube, Okigwe, in present-day Imo State. His formal education began in 1944 at Methodist Central School, Ihube where he came under the influence of remarkably dedicated teachers. The most outstanding of them was Mr. Oji Iheukumere, the head teacher, a native of Uzuakoli, in today's Abia State who was a noted church musician and disciplinarian. At Ihube Central School Afigbo's brilliance manifested early which made his teachers encourage him to go to secondary school in spite of the opposition of his parents who were intimidated by the cost of post-primary education. He succeeded in his bid and went to St. Augustine's (CMS) Grammar School, Nkwerre Orlu in Imo State. with an Okigwe Native Administration scholarship won in a competitive examination. There, again, he came across a crop of teachers who left a definite imprint on him. Foremost among those were Mazi F. C. Ogbalu, a teacher of Igbo language and culture and the founder of the Society for Promoting Igbo Language and Culture; C.G.I. Eneli a history graduate of the University College, Ibadan and E. C. Ezekwesili, the principal of the college and a history graduate of the University of Southampton, UK. These three teachers helped to determine his future academic career. From St. Augustine's Grammar School, Afigbo gained admission to study history at University College, Ibadan (then affiliated with University of London), with a scholarship from the government of Eastern Nigeria. There again, he met scholars noted for their brilliance and beneficent influence – J.D. Omer-Cooper, J.C. Anene, J.F. Ade Ajayi and Kenneth Onwuka Dike. There were also his colleagues – Obaro Ikime and Philip Igbafe who not only read history with him, but with him went on to pioneer the "made in Nigeria PhD" at the infant University of Ibadan with the help of post-graduate scholarships awarded by the university to the best graduating students. Afigbo had not only graduated top of his class, but also was the first among his colleagues to complete his PhD. With this, he became the first person to receive a doctoral degree from a Nigerian university.

== Early career ==
On obtaining the PhD, Afigbo was appointed a lecturer in history, a position he held for two years before fleeing to the University of Nigeria, Nsukka in the wake of the Nigerian Civil War. During the duration of hostilities, he served in the Directorate for Propaganda of the Ministry of Information, Republic of Biafra. He resumed his interrupted academic duties after the war, and rose on the academic ladder – from lecturer to professor in 1972, thus reaching the top of his profession after only five years. A year after attaining to professorship, he was appointed the Head of the Department of History and Archaeology. The year after, he became also the Dean of the Faculty of Arts. He was acting director of the Leo Hansberry Institute of African Studies, University of Nigeria from 1971 to 1972. He was substantive director of the same Institute from 1989 to 1992. During his tenure as director, he organised seminars which contributed to the academic growth of those who attended. He held the following public appointments among others – pioneer Director of Research at the National Institute for policy and Strategic Studies, Kuru, Jos; Commissioner first for Education and then for Local Government in the Government of Imo State; Chairman of the Michael Okpara College of Agriculture, Umuagwo in Imo State and Sole Administrator of the Alvan Ikoku College of Education, Owerri. He was also awarded an Honorary Member of the Historical Association of Great Britain, Fellow of the Historical Society of Nigeria, the Nigerian National Order of Merit, the Fellowship of the Nigerian Academy of Letters. His traditional chieftaincy titles include Ogbute-Okewe-Ibe, Ogbuzuo, and Olaudah.

== Work as historian ==
Afigbo was a historian of Africa, of Nigeria, of Southeastern Nigeria, and finally a historian of the Igbo. He was a political historian, an economic and social historian, and of historiography. Myth, History and Society, one of the three volumes of his essays edited by Toyin Falola is devoted to theorizing on the methods of doing history in Africa, on the sources of history in Africa, on the place and purpose of history in Africa and other related issues. In many publications, he sought to use the particular to illuminate the universal, and the universal to illuminate the particular. Thus, for instance, he used a detailed study of the textile process in Southern Nigeria to throw much helpful light on the socio-cultural dynamics of the societies of the region. In a similar manner he used the rise and expansion of the pre-colonial great states such as Benin to show that the so-called segmentary societies as well as the so-called mini-states of pre-colonial Africa are, among other things, fossilized reminders of the conditions from which the great states arose.

Afigbo broke away from the action-reaction thesis that ruled the new African historiography when he joined the history profession. He did so by emphasising in his works basic reconstructionist history, the study of peoples and cultures in their own right.

== Death ==
Afigbo died in Enugu, Nigeria in the early hours of Monday, 9 March 2009 after a brief illness.

== Works ==
- The Warrant Chiefs: Indirect Rule in Southeastern Nigeria 1891–1929 (Longman, London, 1972)
- Ropes of Sand: Studies in Igbo History and Culture (University Press Limited, Ibadan 1981)
- The Igbo and Their Neighbours: Inter-group Relations In Southeastern Nigeria to 1953 (University Press Limited, Ibadan, 1987)
- Groundwork of Igbo History (Vista Books Limited, Lagos, 1992)
- Image of the Igbo (Vista Books Limited, Lagos, 1992)
- The Abolition of the Slave Trade in Southeastern Nigeria 1885–1950 (University of Rochester Press, 2006)

== Collected works edited by Toyin Falola ==
- Nigerian History Politics and Affairs (Africa World Press, Trenton New Jersey, 2005)
- Igbo History and Society (Africa World Press, Trenton New Jersey, 2005)
- Myth, History and Society (Africa World Press, Trenton New Jersey, 2006)

== Bibliography ==
- Ottenberg, S., Farmers and Townspeople in A Changing Nigeria (Spectrum Books Ltd, Ibadan, 2005) pp. 32–33, 50, 54, 84,101
  Northrup, D. Trade Without Rulers (Clarendon Press, Oxford, 1978) pp. 34–37
  Isichei, E. A History of the Igbo People (Macmillan Press, London 1976), pp 30, 66, 67, 123, 145, 153, 254.
  Manfredi, V., "Philological Perspectives on the Southeastern Nigeria Diaspora" in Contours: A Journal of the African Diaspora, Fall 2004 vol. 2 no. 2
- Falola, T. and Heaton, M. “Afigbo’s Scholarship: An Introduction” in Myth, History and Society: The Collected Works of Adiele Afigbo edited by Toyin Falola (Africa World Press, Trenton, NJ, 2006) pp. 3–19.
  Korieh, C.J.,”Historians, Historiography and Historical Interpretations” in Falola T, (ed.) Myth, History and Society: The Collected Works of Adiele Afigbo, pp. 21–28
  Oyebade, A. “Africanizing Knowledge: The Burden of Academic Historiography” in Falola, T., Myth, History and Society: The Collected Works of Adiele Afigbo, pp. 29–34
- Olukoju, A. “(Re)Reading Afigbo’s Work On Nigeria” in Nigerian History, Politics and Affairs The Collected Essays of Adiele Afigbo edited by Toyin Falola (Africa World Press, Trenton, NJ, 2005) pp. 15–30
  Agbali, A.A., “A Reflection on Afigbo's Writings on Nigeria” in Falola, T. (ed.) Nigerian History, Politics and Affairs pp. 31–50
  Nwaubani, E., “Afigbo’s Views on Nigeria” in Falola, T. (ed) Nigerian History Politics and Affairs pp. 51–62
- Kalu, O. “Cameos Of The Igbo Past” in Igbo History and Society: The Essays of Adiele Afigbo edited by Falola, T., (Africa World Press, Trenton, New Jersey, 2005) pp. 17–30.
  Njoku, O., “A Synoptic Overview”: in Falola, T. (ed.) Igbo History and Society pp. 31–42
  Njoku, R.C. “Adiele Afigbo:Imperial History and the Challenges of Igbo Historical Studies” in Falola, T., (ed.) Igbo History and Society pp43–57
- Falola, T., and Heatom, M.,”The Works of A.E. Afigbo on Nigeria: An Historiographical Essay” in History in Africa 33 (2006) pp155–178
  Alagoa, E.J, The Uses of Hindsight as Foresight: Reflections on Niger Delta and Nigerian History (Onyoma ResearchPublications, Port Harcourt 2004) p. 138 ff.
- Falola, T.
