= Gbadamosi =

Surname list

- Languages: Yoruba, Hausa

Origin
- Origin: Nigeria
- Meaning: servant of the generous one
- Region of origin: South West, Nigeria

Gbàdàmọ́ṣí is a Nigerian male given name and surname predominantly used among African Muslims, particularly within the Yorubas and pronounced Badamosi in most Hausa communities. Derived from Arabic, "Badmus" with the meaning "servant of the generous one" Also, from another view, which stated that the name "Gbadamosi" a name of unexplained origin from O̩yo̩ state in Western, Nigeria; possibly an adjectival derivative of the name of the city of Ghadames (Berber Ɣdames) on the caravanserai route over the desert in Libya on the borders of Tunisia and Algeria.

== Notable individuals with the name ==
- Amosa Gbadamosi (born 1942), Ghanaian footballer
- Babatunde Gbadamosi (born 1967), Real estate developer and politician.
- Bakare Gbadamosi (born 1930), Nigerian poet
- Gabriel Gbadamosi, British poet, playwright and novelist of Irish-Nigerian descent
- Nureni Gbadamosi (born 1947), Nigerian boxer
- Raimi Gbadamosi (born 1965), British artist and writer
- TGO Gbadamosi, Nigerian historian
