= Duro Oni =

Nigerian professor and university administrator (born 1952)

- Born: 15 December 1952 (age 73); Minna, Niger State, Nigeria
- Occupations: Academic, writer
- Known for: Former President of the Nigerian Academy of Letters
- Title: Professor of Theatre Arts

Academic background
- Education: University of Ibadan, California Institute of the Arts

Academic work
- Discipline: Theatre arts
- Institutions: University of Lagos
- Main interests: Theatre design and aesthetics, stage lighting, cultural studies, Nollywood

Duro Oni (Yorùbá: Dúró Òní; born on 15 December 1952) is a Nigerian professor of Theatre Arts at the University of Lagos. He served as president of the Nigerian Academy of Letters. His research interests include theatre arts design and aesthetics, stage lighting, dramatic literature and criticism, cultural studies, and the Nigerian film industry/Nollywood.

== Early life ==
Oni earned a diploma in drama from the University of Ibadan in 1973. He later completed Bachelor's and Master's of Fine Arts degrees in Performing Arts Design and Technology from the California Institute of the Arts. He achieved his Ph.D. in Theatre Arts at the University of Ibadan.

== Career ==
Oni worked as a theatre stage technician at Ahmadu Bello University, Zaria between 1973 and 1975. He was nominated for the British Council Artists Fellowship programme in 1975.

=== Public service ===
- Special adviser to the Nigerian Minister of Culture and Social Welfare from 1990 to 1991
- Adviser to the Minister of Youth and Sports from 1991 and 1992.

=== University of Lagos ===
At the University of Lagos, Oni served in several key academic and administrative roles:

- Director, Centre for Cultural Studies, University of Lagos from 1992 to 1997
- Initiated and developed the bachelor's degree programme in Creative Arts in 1997 (expanded in 2013) Chief Executive Officer of the Centre for Black and African Arts and Civilization from 2000 to 2006
- Pioneer Director of the Confucius Institute at the University of Lagos from 2008 to 2009
- Head of the Department of Creative Arts 2006–2009
- Dean of the Faculty of Arts 2009 to 2013
- Deputy Vice Chancellor (Management Services) 2013–2017

=== Nigerian Academy of Letters ===
- Vice president 2018–2021
- President 2021

Oni retired from the University of Lagos on 15 December 2022, upon reaching age 70.

== Publications ==
Oni published monographs and edited volumes, including:

- Striking Expressions: Theatre and Culture in National Development (2017)
- The Soyinka Impulse: Essays on Wole Soyinka edited with Bisi Adigun (2019)
- Larger than His Frame II: Critical Studies and Reflections on Olu Obafemi (2021)

He wrote articles in peer-reviewed academic journals such as African Performance Review and Social Dynamics.

In 2012, a festschrift, Fireworks for a Lighting Aesthetician: Essays and Tributes in Honour of Duro Oni @ 60, was published in honour of Oni's scholarship.
