= Afro-pessimism =

Afro-pessimism or Afropessimism may refer to:

- Afro-pessimism (Africa), a narrative about political and economic development in Sub-Saharan Africa in the 1980s and 1990s
- Afropessimism (philosophy), a theoretical framework in Afro-American studies
