= Akanmu =

- Gender: Male
- Language: Yoruba

Origin
- Origin: Nigerian
- Meaning: The personally chosen
- Region of origin: South-west Nigeria

AkanmuAkanmu is a Nigerian masculine given name of Yoruba origin derived from the words a (one who), kàn (deliberately, specifically), and mú (choose, select), morphologically structured as Àkànmú, meaning "the personally chosen," someone deliberately selected or set apart with purpose. It serves as an oríkì (praise name). It is also a surname.

Notable people with the name include:

- Akanmu Adebayo (born 1956) Nigerian professor of history
- Iyabo Akanmu (born 1968) Nigerian table tennis player
