= Ibadan School =

Intellectual tradition in the study of the history of Nigeria

Kenneth Dike (left) poses with the Northern Nigerian leader Ahmadu Bello (right) during a visit to the University of Ibadan in February 1962

The Ibadan School of History was the first, and for many years the dominant, intellectual tradition in the study of the history of Nigeria. It originated at the University of Ibadan, in Ibadan, Nigeria, in the 1950s, and remained dominant until the 1970s. The University of Ibadan was the first degree-awarding institution to open in Nigeria, and its scholars played major roles in setting up the history departments at most of Nigeria's other universities, spreading the Ibadan historiography. Its scholars also wrote some of the textbooks that were used at all levels of the Nigerian education system for many years. The school's output is often considered to be most clearly embodied in the "Ibadan History Series".

Nwaubani argues that Kenneth Dike (1917–83) was the first modern scholarly proponent of Africanist history. His publications were a watershed in African historiography. With a PhD from London in 1940, Dike became the first African to complete Western historical professional training. At the University College Ibadan, he became the first African professor of history and head of a history department. He helped found the Historical Society of Nigeria and the National Archives of Nigeria. His book Trade and Politics in the Niger Delta 1830-1885 dealt with 19th-century economic politics in the Niger Delta. He focused on internal African factors, especially defensive measures undertaken by the delta societies against imperialist penetration. Dike helped create the Ibadan School of African history and promoted the use of oral evidence by African historians.

Other leading scholars of the Ibadan School include Saburi Biobaku, Jacob Ade Ajayi, J. A. Atanda, J. C. Anene, Adiele Afigbo, E. A. Ayandele, Obaro Ikime and Tekena Tamuno. A number of foreign scholars, many of whom came to teach in Nigeria, are also often associated with the school, including Eveline C. Martin, Michael Crowder, Abdullahi Smith, A.F.C. Ryder, J. B. Webster, R. J. Gavin, Robert Smith, and John D. Omer-Cooper.

The school was characterized by its overt Nigerian nationalism and it was geared towards forging a Nigerian identity through publicizing the glories of pre-colonial history. The school was quite traditional in its subject matter, being largely confined to the political history that colleagues in Europe and North America were then rejecting. It was very modern, however, in the sources used. Much use was made of oral history and throughout the school took a strongly interdisciplinary approach to gathering information. This was especially true after the founding of the Institute for African Studies that brought together experts from many disciplines.

There was some friction between the Ibadan School and the Africanists in Britain and the US. The Africanists felt that the Nigerian scholars should be more objective and less involved in current politics. However, the quality of the methodology and scholarship of the Ibadan scholars was never questioned. Conversely, the African scholars of the Ibadan School saw the American and British universities as bastions of imperialism. As a result, nationalists shunned the western based Journal of African History in favour of the domestic Journal of the Historical Society of Nigeria.

The Ibadan School began to decline in importance in the 1970s. The Nigerian Civil War led some to question whether Nigeria was in fact a unified nation with a national history. At the same time, rival schools of history began to emerge. At Ahmadu Bello University in Zaria, Nigeria, the Islamic Legitimist school arose that rejected Western models in favour of the scholarly tradition of the Sokoto Caliphate and the Islamic world. From other parts of Africa, the Neo-Marxist school began to gain currency. Social, economic, and cultural history also began to grow in prominence, as was the case at the Lagos school of history with its applied history approach.

In the 1980s Nigerian scholarship in general began to decline, and the Ibadan School was much affected. The military rulers looked upon the universities with deep suspicion and they were poorly funded as a result. Many top minds were co-opted with plum jobs in the administration and left academia. Others left the country entirely for jobs at universities in the West. The economic collapse of the 1980s also greatly hurt the scholarly community, especially the sharp devaluation of the Nigerian currency. This made inviting foreign scholars, subscribing to journals, and attending overseas conferences vastly more expensive. Many of the domestic journals, including the Journal of the Historical Society of Nigeria, faltered and were only published rarely, if at all.

== See also ==
- Cambridge School of historiography
- Historiography of the British Empire
