= Kayode Adams =

Nigerian activist (??–1969)

Kayode Ted Adams (died October 1969) was a student activist at the University of Lagos (UNILAG) who became controversial in 1965 after stabbing then-Vice Chancellor (VC) of the University of Lagos, Saburi Biobaku.

== Attack on Saburi Biobaku ==
Following the non-renewal of Prof Eni Njoku's term as Vice-Chancellor of UNILAG, Prof Saburi Biobaku was appointed VC by the government of Sir Abubakar Tafawa Balewa, then Prime Minister of Nigeria. The decision was unpopular among UNILAG students, who perceived ethnic favoritism in Biobaku's appointment.

During Biobaku's outreach to the UNILAG community in June 1965, Kayode Adams approached the podium and stabbed Biobaku in the back. The incident led to tensions, resulting in the shutdown of UNILAG for several months.

== Trial ==
Adams was arraigned for stabbing Biobaku, raised a defense of insanity, and pleaded not guilty. Despite his insanity defense, Adams was found guilty of attempted murder, confined to the Yaba Psychiatric Hospital, and rusticated from UNILAG.

== Death ==
Adams was found dead at Bar Beach, presumably from drowning in October 1969.
