= Nigerian Academy of Letters =

National academy of arts and literature

- Abbreviation: NAL
- Formation: 17 July 1974; 52 years ago
- Type: Autonomous learned society
- Legal status: A national academy
- Purpose: Promotion of scholarship and research in Humanities
- Headquarters: NAL Secretariat
- Location: Abuja, Nigeria
- Region served: Worldwide
- Members: 84 Fellows
- Official language: English
- President: Professor Duro Oni
- Website: Official website

The Nigerian Academy of Letters is a national academy and apex body of arts and literature in Nigeria. It is an autonomous, scholarly and non-political state institution for advancing scholarship and public interest in the humanities at the highest level in Nigeria. The incumbent president of the academy is Professor Duro Oni.

Established in 1974 after recommendation of "Udoji Report of 1974" it is currently governed by executive committee of distinguished professors and promote a limited number of four types of fellows: Foundation Fellows, Regular Fellows, Overseas Fellows and Honorary Fellows on a yearly basis.

There are currently 84 Fellows in the academy; 7 foundation fellows, 51 regular fellows, 12 overseas fellows and 14 honorary fellows.

== History ==
The academy was established in 1974 after a governmental report Udoji Report of 1974 made a recommendation for the creation of national academies.

== Fellowship ==
There are four types of fellows in the Nigerian Academy of Letters: Foundation Fellows, Regular Fellows (normally resident in Nigeria), Overseas Fellows (resident abroad) and Honorary Fellows. Fellows are appointed for life and every prospective fellow must be nominated by a living Fellow. Self-nomination is forbidden. The Fellowship is given rarely to distinguished professors after a rigorous election exercise. Not more than two candidates from any discipline and not more than four in any one year can be admitted into the academy. Elected Fellows are inducted at an investiture ceremony, which formally confers on them the right to use the postnominal Fellow of the Nigerian Academy of Letters (FNAL).

=== Foundation Fellows ===
Foundation Fellowship is static, non elected body of Nigerian scholars who are the founding members of the academy.

- Professor Emeritus Ayo Bamgbose, NNOM (Foundation President)
- Professor Emeritus J. F. Ade Ajayi NNOM
- Professor Emeritus Adiele Afigbo, NNOM
- Professor Emeritus Adeboye Babalola, NNOM
- Professor Chinua Achebe, NNOM
- Professors J. P. Clark-Bekederemo, NNOM
- Professor Wole Soyinka, Nobel Laureate

== See also ==
- Nigeria Academy of Science
