= Saburi Biobaku =

Nigerian historian (1918–2001)

2nd Vice chancellor of the University of Lagos
- In office 1965–1971
- Preceded by: Eni Njoku
- Succeeded by: J. F. Ade Ajayi

Personal details
- Born: 16 June 1918 Abeokuta, Southern Region, British Nigeria (now in Ogun State, Nigeria)
- Died: 2001 (aged 82–83)
- Education: Trinity College, Cambridge
- Scientific career
- Known for: Yoruba historiography
- Fields: History
- Workplaces: University of Ibadan; University of Lagos

Saburi Oladeni Biobaku CMG (1918–2001) was a Nigerian scholar, a historian who was among a set of Yoruba historians who followed the pioneering effort of Samuel Johnson in setting the foundations of Yoruba historiography and creating reference notes of indigenous African historical literature.

He was a former vice-chancellor of the University of Lagos and served as a pro-chancellor of the Obafemi Awolowo University.

== Life ==
=== Education and early career ===
Biobaku was born in Igbore, Abeokuta to the family of a prominent Muslim chief and wealthy transporter Sanni Oloyede Biobaku, who bore the initials S.O.B., same as Saburi. He was educated at Ogbe Methodist Primary School, Abeokuta, Government College, Ibadan and Yaba Higher College. He also attended Cambridge University for his master's degree and the University of London's, Institute of Historical Research for his Ph.D. degree. He returned to Nigeria after his first degree to start his teaching career and worked as a school master in his former school at Government College, Ibadan and Government College, Umuahia. He later became the Secretary to the Premier and the Executive Council (SPEC) of the Western Region, Nigeria. Prior to becoming the premier's secretary, Biobaku was taught by him during his primary school days at Abeokuta. He returned to Nigeria after obtaining the PhD degree in 1953 to serve as the first African Registrar of the University of Ibadan.

=== Later career ===
In 1957, he wrote a book on his tribe, Egba. The Egbas are a sub group of the Yoruba peoples who are predominantly found in Abeokuta. The book was titled: 'The Egba and their Neighbours', and was originally written as a dissertation but later turned into a 136-page text. He focused on the position of the Egba within historical contexts and factors that effected change in Yorubaland. The book also contained information on Egbaland during the coming of the Christian missionaries in the nineteenth century. At the time, the book was the second Nigerian authored historical study published by the Oxford University Press, after Kenneth Dike's, 'Trade and Politics in the Niger Delta'. He later wrote 'Sources of Yoruba History', published in 1973, and many other books.

In the early years of Nigeria's independence, while serving in the administration of Awolowo, he advocated an optimistic but cautious approach to Pan-Africanism, believing that the freedom the country fought for and gained with independence should be used early on by the government and many others to nurture the individual African personalities that reside within the country especially in matters affecting health, literacy and eliminating poverty. However, he supported the promotion of regional organizations for economic and social aims and the view of Pan-Africanism as described by Anthony Enahoro, that it is a consummation devoutly to be wished.

In 1965, he was appointed the Vice-Chancellor of the University of Zambia, but he was pressured by Nigeria's Prime Minister Alhaji Abubakar Tafawa-Balewa to accept an offer of becoming the second Vice Chancellor of University of Lagos. He was later stabbed by Kayode Adams, a student radical who believed Biobaku's appointment was unfair and ethnically motivated.

In his later years, he was involved in moves to promote Yoruba unity, especially after the demise of general Sani Abacha. He also sought a re-appraisal of the country's political structure, favoring a four tier system of governance, made up of federal, regional, state and local administrations. He also served as the chairman of the Nigerian National Antiques Commission, Nigerian Textile Mills and the editorial board of Encyclopedia Africana.

== Legacy ==
A hall of residence at the University of Lagos is named after Biobaku. Saburi Biobaku Hall is among the university's older university-managed hostels, alongside King Jaja Hall, Mariere Hall, Sodeinde Hall and Madam Tinubu Hall. The hall remains in use as student accommodation.

== Works ==
- Sources of Yoruba History, Oxford University Press (November 1, 1973). ISBN 0-19-821669-6
- The Egba and their Neighbours, 1842–1872. ISBN 978-2490-95-4
- The Living Culture of Nigeria. Biobaku, with Mr Peccinotti. Nelson Publishers (January 1, 1976). ISBN 978-126-189-7
- The Origin of the Yorubas 1971. Lagos:Federal Ministry of Information.
