= Africa Rising =

Term for rapid economic growth in Africa

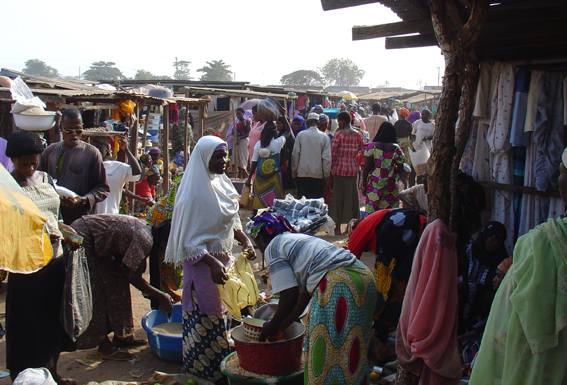
A market in Nigeria; Africa Rising is particularly associated with the growth of local entrepreneurship

Africa Rising is a term coined in 2011 to explain rapid economic growth across Sub-Saharan Africa to date since 2000 and the inevitability of its subsequent continuation. The Financial Times defines Africa Rising as a "narrative that improved governance means the continent is almost predestined to enjoy a long period of mid-to-high single-digit economic growth, rising incomes and an emerging middle class." The term was first coined by The Economist in December 2011.

"Africa Rising" has been particularly associated with the democratisation of African states since the end of the Cold War, comparative peace, greater availability of mobile phones and the Internet, and increase in African consumer spending as well as a growth in entrepreneurship. In the decade between 2005 and 2015, the economy of Africa as a whole increased by 50 per cent in contrast with a world average of 23 per cent.

The term gained widespread use in the mid-2010s. It was the title of a 2014 conference held in Mozambique by the International Monetary Fund. It was used by the BBC and both The Economist and Time devoted front-pages to the narrative. The term has also spawned a number of spin-off ideas, such as "Latin America Rising" and "Asia Rising".

"Africa Rising" has been criticised by some as being a "stereotype" of Africa as a continent "brimming with mobile phones and energetic businesses". Critics have also argued that the narrative has been undermined by experience of the West African Ebola virus epidemic (2013–16) and the persistence of conflict in parts of the continent. Critics have also claimed that the 18 million Africans considered "middle class" are too small a proportion (3.3 percent) of the overall population to justify claims of rapid social change brought about by Africa Rising.

Patrick Bond has argued that "Africa Rising" was coined at "the very moment that Africa's GDP ceased its rapid 2002–11 increase" following a sustained period of surging commodity prices and that their subsequent collapse "did not set the stage for renewed competitiveness, business confidence, or [transnational corporations'] investment, but instead catalyzed another round of fiscal crises, extreme current account deficits, sovereign debt defaults and intense social protests." He described "Africa Rising" as a neoliberal "chimera".

== See also ==
- Economic history of Africa
- BRICS (2010) and MINT (2014)
- Afro-pessimism (Africa)
- African Renaissance (1946–)
