= Christie Ade Ajayi =

Nigerian specialist in early childhood education

- Born: Christie Aduke Martins; 13 March 1930 (age 96); Ile Oluji, Ondo State, Nigeria
- Spouse: J. F. Ade Ajayi

Christie Ade Ajayi (born 1930) is a Nigerian specialist in early childhood education. She is the author of various English-language books for young children, and has made a point of writing stories with a Nigerian setting that her readers can relate to. As well as having long experience of teaching she has been active in a number of organisations concerned with children and education.

== Biography ==
Born Christie Aduke Martins on 13 March 1930 in Ile Oluji, Ondo State, Christie Ade Ajayi (also written Ade-Ajayi) went to Kudeti Girls' School in Ibadan (now known as St. Anne's School) and then to United Missionary College, Ibadan where she trained to be a teacher. She also studied in London at the Froebel Institute and then at the Institute of Education where she received a Diploma in Child Development in 1958. Between 1952 and 1978 she taught in various schools in Nigeria and one in London, became a headmistress, and also went to San Jose State University, California where she was awarded a Diploma in Elementary School Administration and Leadership in 1971. She married J. F. Ade Ajayi in 1956 with whom she had five children. A friend of the family has described her "outgoing nature" and the family's "hospitable house".

== Books ==
Ade Ajayi's experience in early years teaching led to a concern "with the learning needs of Nigerian children". She was motivated to encourage preschoolers and beginner readers by offering them books that reflected their own experience and culture. While enjoying stories and pictures of West African characters they could enlarge their vocabulary and develop reading skills.

Among her books are:

- Ade, our naughty little brother, Ibadan: Onibonoje, 1974
- The old story-teller, Ibadan: Onibonoje, 1975 (inspired by Yoruba folktales)
- Akin goes to school, with Michael Crowder, African Universities Press; J. Murray 1978
- Ali's bicycle, Ibadan: Macmillan, 1982
- Emeka's dog, Ibadan: Macmillan, 1982
- The book of animal riddles, Ibadan: Macmillan, 1982
- Pictionary, Longman 1986
- Which Way, Amina?, Macmillan Nigeria Publishers Ltd, 2001
- The Big Yellow House, West African Book Publishers Limited, 2004

== Education expert ==
She has held a variety of leadership posts in educational organisations. These include:

- Founder of the Ibadan branch of the World Organization for Early Childhood Education (OMEP:Organisation Mondiale Pour L'Éducation Préscolaire) in 1986. As a long-standing honorary member of OMEP she helped host their 2009 world assembly in Lagos.
- Chairman, Nursery School Board, University of Lagos
- Consultant in Early Childhood Education, University of Ibadan
- Member, Board of Governors, University of Lagos 1972-1978
- Member, Board of Governors, St. Mary's Girls School, Ikole-Ekiti, 1976-1980

In 1993 the International Journal of Early Childhood published her article on 'Collaboration with other international agencies in community development programmes: The Nigerian experience'.
