= Lagos School =

Intellectual tradition in the study of the history of Nigeria

The Lagos School of History (also known simply as the Lagos School) is a series of research traditions in the study of the history of Nigeria. It originated at the University of Lagos and Lagos State University, both in Lagos, Nigeria, in the 1990s, and remains dominant among Nigerian historians today. Many of its exponents were graduates of the earlier Ibadan School, and its scholars played major roles in combining much of that school's methodology of historical inquiry with activist scholarship in what is a homegrown manifestation of applied history.
