= F. C. Ogbalu =

Nigerian linguist and educator

- Born: Frederick Chidozie Ogbalu; 20 July 1927; Abagana, Njikoka, Anambra State
- Died: 21 October 1990 (aged 63)
- Education: University of London
- Occupations: Linguist, educator
- Notable work: Society for Promoting Igbo Language and Culture

Chief Frederick Chidozie Ogbalu // (1927–1990) known predominantly as F. C. Ogbalu, was a Nigerian linguist and educator. He is predominantly known for standardizing Igbo language and is often called the "father" of Igbo language and culture. In 1949, he founded the Society for Promoting Igbo Language and Culture. Ogbalu served as the society's president for many years.

Ogbalu's work has had a significant impact on the Igbo language and culture. He is credited with helping to standardize the Igbo language and with promoting its use. He is also credited with helping to preserve Igbo culture.

Ogbalu died in 1990. He is remembered as a pioneer in the study of the Igbo language and culture.
