= Raimi Gbadamosi =

British artist and writer

Raimi Olakunle Gbadamosi (born 1965 in Manchester) is a contemporary British conceptual artist and writer. His work addresses themes of identity and art theory, using his trademark motif of yellow, white and black.

== Life and work ==
His middle name stems from the words "Ola" meaning "wealth" and "Kunle" meaning "surplus at home" in Yoruba. Gbadamosi attained his doctorate in fine art from The Slade, London, in 2001. He also has an MA in fine art from Manchester Metropolitan University (1995) and a BA in fine art from Staffordshire University (1994). Gbadamosi taught fine art as an honorary research fellow at the Slade School of Art and has also curated various group exhibitions. As a writer, he has had his work published in the arts journal Third Text, among other publications. He has also lived in Johannesburg, South Africa where he taught fine art at the University of the Witwatersrand and at the University of Pretoria. He left the University of Pretoria in 2018.

According to Zoe Li, of Arts Council England: "Raimi's work investigates the complexity of social and cultural politics, often challenging our view on ethnicity, race and culture." Key pieces include "Swadsquad", a three-sided chess board. In 2007 he participated with commissioned artists at Plymouth City Museum and Art Gallery, where he created an alternative tour of the museum entitled Drakes Circus, drawing attention to objects of interest relating to slavery.

Examples of Gbadamosi's work are held in several public art collections, including the Henry Moore Institute in Leeds, Novas in Liverpool and the Centre for Contemporary Art, University of Central Lancashire. Through his website, spectators may download and keep 'Free' artworks by the artist, predominantly in the form of written text. Gbadamosi has exhibited his work throughout Britain as well as internationally.

In 2020 Gbadamosi was selected to judge the Sasol New Signatures art award. Due to the COVID-19 pandemic, the competition was cancelled.
