= Ayo Bamgbose =

Nigerian linguist (1932–2026)

- Born: Ayọ̀rìndé Bámgbóṣé; 27 January 1932; Odopotu, Colony and Protectorate of Nigeria
- Died: 25 July 2026 (aged 94); Ibadan, Oyo State, Nigeria
- Education: University College London, University of Edinburgh
- Occupations: Linguist, academic, scholar

Ayọ̀rìndé Bámgbóṣé (27 January 1932 – 25 July 2026) was a Nigerian linguist and academic who was the first professor of linguistics in Nigeria. He made contributions to education and linguistics, achieving recognition in form of honours and election to offices in professional bodies.

== Early life and education ==
Bamgbose was born in Odopotu, near Ijebu Ode, now in Ogun State, Nigeria, on 27 January 1932. His father, Rev. Sangodipe Bamgbose, was a community leader of Odopotu, who was born into a prominent family of Egungun worshippers. His last name Bamgbose, which means "help me carry Shango's axe" (Oṣé), and his father's first name, meaning "Sango consoles", also suggest that his family also worshipped Ṣango, the Oriṣa of thunder. After primary education Bamgbose was admitted, in 1948, into St. Andrew's College. He qualified as a grade-two teacher in 1951. He then gained admission into the University of Ibadan, affiliated with the University of London. He graduated with a high second-class upper-division B.A. (Hons) English degree of the University of London in the year 1960. He proceeded to the University of Edinburgh where he earned a diploma in general linguistics in 1961 and his PhD in 1963 with the thesis A Study of Structures and Classes in the Grammar of Modern Yoruba.

== Career ==
Bamgbose joined the staff of the University of Ibadan in 1963 as a lecturer, progressing to senior lecturer in 1966 and professor in 1968. Bamgbose held several positions of responsibility at the University of Ibadan, including Warden, Hall master, Head department of linguistics and African languages; Dean faculty of Arts, Chairman, Senate committee on the general studies programme; and Chairman, Senate publications committee. On retirement from the University, he was honoured with the title of Professor Emeritus.

Bamgbose worked on the structure of the Yoruba language. Grammar of Yoruba (Cambridge University Press, 1966) covers the application of modern linguistics to Yoruba, and Fonologi ati Girama Yoruba (University Press Ltd., Ibadan, 1990) tackles the problem of linguistic metalanguage of Yoruba students. Bamgbose also wrote over 130 papers or chapters in books.

== Death ==
Bamgbose died on 25 July 2026, at the age of 94.

== Honours and accomplishments ==
In 1984, Bamgbose became the first African linguist to be conferred honorary membership of the Linguistic Society of America (LSA). In 2000, he was elected as the first African president of the International Association of World Englishes. In 2003, he was elected the 2nd Vice-President of the Permanent International Committee of Linguists, the first time an African linguist has been so honoured. In 2009, he was elected Foundation President of the Assembly of Academicians of the African Academy of Languages (ACALAN). He was also a member of the executive committee of the Nigerian Academy of Letters of which he was the foundation member. He was the sole recipient of the Nigerian National Order of Merit in 1990.

== Notable visiting appointments ==
- Visiting Professor to University of Hamburg in 1979–80
- Visiting Fellow to Clare Hall, Cambridge University in 1987–88
- George A. Miller Visiting Professor to the University of Illinois, Urbana-Champaign in 1993–95
- Visiting Professor to the University of Leipzig in 1997–1999.
