= Centre for Black and African Arts and Civilization =

Nigerian government agency

- Abbreviation: CBAAC

Agency overview
- Formed: 1979 (47 years ago)

Jurisdictional structure
- Federal agency (Operations jurisdiction): Nigeria
- Operations jurisdiction: Nigeria
- Legal jurisdiction: Centre for Black and African Arts and Civilization
- Governing body: President of Nigeria
- Constituting instrument: It was established by Decree 69 of 1979
- General nature: Federal law enforcement

Operational structure
- Headquarters: 36/38, Broad Street, Lagos, Nigeria
- Agency executive: Mrs Aishah Augie, Director-General

Website
- cbaac.gov.ng

The Centre for Black and African Arts and Civilization (CBAAC) is an agency of the Federal Republic of Nigeria under the Federal Ministry of Information and National Orientation that oversees initiatives to recover and revitalize the cultural and natural legacy of African descendants. Through its efforts, the centre aims to safeguard, conserve, and promote this heritage, thereby enhancing its understanding and appreciation.

== History ==
The commission is a parastatal under the Federal Ministry of Information and National Orientation to oversee the cultural preservation. It was established by Decree 69 of 1979 after the successful 2nd World Black and African Festival of Arts and Culture (FESTAC '77).The centre is home to various artefacts and cultural items from the festival, which were entrusted to Nigeria by 59 participating Black and African countries and communities. CBAAC was empowered to promote and preserve Black and African cultural heritage and civilization through various activities like seminars, workshops, and exhibitions. It was upgraded to a Pan-African Heritage Centre in 2000.

== Functions ==
In accordance with the provision of the Constitution, sections 14(3) and 4, the commission is mandated to develop and issue guidelines for government agencies, employers, and providers of services and socio-economic amenities nationwide to preserve and promote the African cultural heritage through creative economy.

== Purpose ==
According to Aisha Augie, the Director-General of the agency,

"My vision for CBAAC is for it to become a Pan-African agency, not just a Nigerian agency, but one that actually connects with the rest of the world. We want to be able to be a strong voice for Africa. We want to continue to advocate for the growth of the creative and cultural economy. We want to be able to add value in preserving and obviously telling the right stories that matter. We believe in our tradition.We believe in data collection. CBAAC needs to become a living, breathing archive, a bigger archive, one that the rest of the world can use to learn about Africa and our peoples".

== Events ==
In September 2026 the CBAAC organized The Roots & Roofs initiative, an exhibition at the Kolanut Gallery, Asokoro, Abuja. The National Troupe of Nigeria (NTN) performed When Walls Remember, a one-movement dance oratorio, combining dance, music, narration and indigenous performance traditions. Roots & Roofs was implemented in collaboration with the Goethe-Institut Nigeria, the British Council Nigeria, the Embassy of Spain in Nigeria, the Embassy of Ireland in Nigeria, the Institute of African and Diaspora Studies (IADS), and the National Troupe of Nigeria.

== Director-General and members ==
1. Aisha Augie-Kuta a Nigerian photographer, filmmaker, and creative artist.
