= Elizabeth Isichei =

New Zealand historian and academic (born 1939)

- Born: Elizabeth Mary Allo; 22 March 1939 (age 87); Tauranga, New Zealand
- Spouse: Peter Isichei (m. 1964; died 2023)
- Children: 5

Academic background
- Education: Nuffield College, Oxford
- Thesis: Quakers and society in Victorian England (1967)

Elizabeth Mary Isichei (née Allo; born 22 March 1939) is a New Zealand author, historian and academic.

== Early life, family and education ==
Isichei was born Elizabeth Mary Allo in Tauranga, New Zealand, on 22 March 1939, the daughter of Albert (an agricultural scientist) and Lorna Allo. She was educated at Tauranga College, and attained the highest marks in New Zealand in the 1955 university entrance scholarship examinations. She went on to study at the University of Canterbury, from where she graduated with a Bachelor of Arts degree in 1960 and won a senior university scholarship. She then completed a Master of Arts with first-class honours in history at Victoria University of Wellington in 1961. Her honours thesis formed the basis of her book, Political Thinking and Social Experience, published in 1964. She won a Commonwealth Scholarship and, after a brief period as a temporary assistant lecturer in history at the University of Canterbury, undertook doctoral studies at Nuffield College, Oxford. Her DPhil thesis, completed in 1967, was titled Quakers and society in Victorian England.

At Oxford, Allo met Peter Isichei, a chemical pathologist. The couple became engaged in 1963, and married on 23 July 1964, going on to have five children.

== Academic career ==
Elizabeth Isichei was a professor in the Department of History at the University of Jos in Nigeria from 1976, and was general editor for Jos Oral History and Literature Texts. She has said that having both a family and career "would not have been possible if my husband had not gone to any lengths to help and encourage me". She was a visiting fellow at the University of Canterbury in 1984, and in 1992 was appointed a professor of religious studies at the University of Otago. On her retirement from Otago in 2006, she was accorded the title of professor emeritus.

Her works and books are centred on Christianity in Africa and the history of Nigeria particularly the Igbo people, including a biography of Michael Tansi, the first Nigerian Trappist monk. She also wrote on contemporary developments in New Zealand Catholicism, and on the religious meanings of Colin McCahon's art.

In 1992, Isichei was awarded a Doctor of Letters degree by the University of Canterbury. She was elected a Fellow of the Royal Society of New Zealand in 1997, but no longer holds that fellowship.

== Poetry ==
Before going to Oxford in 1962, Allo established a reputation as a poet, with her work appearing in publications including the Listener, Landfall, Comment and the Poetry Yearbook. She returned to poetry in the 1990s, and her poems were published in the Listener, Winterspin, and various anthologies, as well as her own published collections.

== Later life ==
Isichei's husband, Peter Isichei, died in 2023.

== Selected works ==
- 1964: Political Thinking and Social Experience: Some Christian Interpretations of the Roman Empire, University of Canterbury Publications
- 1970: Victorian Quakers, Oxford University Press
- 1973: The Ibo People and the Europeans: The Genesis of a Relationship, to 1906, St. Martin's
- 1976: A History of the Igbo People, St. Martin's
- 1977: A History of West Africa since 1800, Africana
- 1977: Igbo Worlds: An Anthology of Oral History and Historical Descriptions, Institute for the Study of Human Issues
- 1981: Entirely for God: The Life of Michael Iwene Tansi, Macmillan Nigeria
- 1982: Studies in the History of Plateau State, Nigeria, Macmillan
- 1983: A History of Nigeria, Longman
- 1995: A History of Christianity in Africa: From Antiquity to the Present, Africa World Press
- 1997: A History of African Societies to 1870, Cambridge University Press
- 2002: Voices of the Poor in Africa, University of Rochester Press (Rochester, NY)
- 2004: The Religious Traditions of Africa: A History, Raeger (Westport, CT)
- 2005: Stoptide, Steele Roberts (New Zealand)
