= Akanmu Adebayo =

Nigerian professor of history

Akanmu G. Adebayo
- Born: 5 January 1956 (age 70)
- Occupation: Professor of History

Academic background
- Education: Bachelors (1979), Masters (1982), and Ph.D. (1986) in History
- Alma mater: Obafemi Awolowo University

Academic work
- Discipline: History
- Sub-discipline: Economic History
- Institutions: Kennesaw State University, Georgia, U.S.
- Main interests: Pastoral economy, economic history of Nigeria, African economic history

Akanmu Gafari Adebayo (born 5 January 1956) is a Nigerian professor of history at Kennesaw State University, the United States. He specializes in African economic history with emphasis on production and distribution of wealth. Adebayo has published widely on various topics on African economy.

== Education ==
Adebayo earned his bachelor's, master's and doctoral degrees all in History at the Obafemi Awolowo University in 1979, 1982, and 1986 respectively. His Ph.D. thesis on the history of revenue allocation in Nigeria was revised into a monograph, Embattled Federalism: A History of Revenue Allocation in Nigeria, 1946-1990, released in 1993.

== Career ==
Adebayo's research and publications explore topics in African Economic History, Chinese and Asian economic relations with African countries, braindrain, leadership and governance in Africa.

As full-time, part-time, or visiting professor, Adebayo has taught in Nigeria, Canada, Germany, and the U.S. He lectured at Obafemi Awolowo University for 11 years, before moving to York University, Toronto for a stint as a Visiting Associate Professor (1991-1992). In 1994, he was a Research Fellow at the Center for Modern Oriental Studies, Berlin. As a faculty member at Kennesaw State University since 1995, Adebayo has held various positions including Director of the Center for Conflict Management (2011-2016); executive director of the Institute for Global Initiatives (2003-2009).

Adebayo served as founding Editor-in-Chief of the Journal of Global Initiatives: Policy, Pedagogy, and Perspective. He is the Series Editor for the Lexington Books' "Conflict and Security in the Developing World" book series.

Adebayo received Kennesaw State’s Tommy Holder Award in 2009, and the Madhuri and Jagdish N. Sheth Faculty Award for Distinguished International Achievement in 2019. In August 2016, Adebayo was inducted as an Overseas Fellow of the Nigerian Academy of Letters.

== Selected publications ==
- Adebayo, Akanmu (2011-06-01). "The New African Diaspora: Engaging the Question of Brain Drain-Brain Gain". Journal of Global Initiatives: Policy, Pedagogy, Perspective. 6 (1). ISSN 1930-3009.
- Adebayo, Akanmu G. (2007). "Currency Devaluation and Rank: The Yoruba and Akan Experiences". African Studies Review. 50 (2): 87–109. doi:10.1353/arw.2007.0077. ISSN 0002-0206.
- Falola, Toyin; Adebayo, Akanmu Gafari. Culture, Politics and Money Among the Yoruba. Transaction Publishers. ISBN 978-1-4128-2111-7.
- Adebayo, A. G. (1995). "Jangali: Fulani Pastoralists and Colonial Taxation in Northern Nigeria". The International Journal of African Historical Studies. 28 (1): 113–150. doi:10.2307/221307. ISSN 0361-7882. JSTOR 221307.
- Adebayo, A. G. (1994). "Money, Credit, and Banking in Precolonial Africa. The Yoruba Experience". Anthropos. 89 (4/6): 379–400. ISSN 0257-9774. JSTOR 40463014.
- Adebayo, A. G. (1992). "The Production and Export of Hides and Skins in Colonial Northern Nigeria, 1900–1945". The Journal of African History. 33 (2): 273–300. doi:10.1017/S0021853700032242. ISSN 1469-5138.
- Adebayo, A. G. (1991). "Of Man and Cattle: A Reconsideration of the Traditions of Origin of Pastoral Fulani of Nigeria". History in Africa. 18: 1–21. doi:10.2307/3172050. ISSN 0361-5413. JSTOR 3172050.
- Adebayo, A.G. (1991). "Taming the Nomads: The Colonial State the Fulani Pastoralists and the Production of Clarified Butter Fat (c.b.f.) in Nigeria, 1930 – 1952". Transafrican Journal of History. 20: 190–212. ISSN 0251-0391. JSTOR 24520310.
