= Society for Promoting Igbo Language and Culture =

Organization

The Society for Promoting Igbo Language and Culture (SPILC) was founded in 1949 by Frederick Chidozie Ogbalu for the promotion of the Igbo language and culture, and has since created a standard dialect for Igbo.
