= Economic dynamism =

Rate and direction of change in an economy

Economic dynamism is the rate and direction of change in an economy. This can include activities like the rate of new business formation, the frequency of labor market turnover, and the geographic mobility of the workforce. Economists disagree on the usefulness of the term, with some calling it too ambiguous, and with others calling it useful to understand the degree of churn in the economy. Proponents of the term note that it can describe an economy's ability to adapt to changing circumstances, such as changing consumer demands or the availability of resources. Some experts correlate economic dynamism with the rate of business start-ups. Rates of consumers changing banking or telecommunications service providers, especially as limited by switching barriers, have been cited as a major influence on economic dynamism.

== See also ==
- Edmund Phelps § Current focus, a major economist's recent work in this area
