= Historical Society of Nigeria =

Society of historians and professors of history

- Formation: 1955; 71 years ago
- Headquarters: Ibadan, Nigeria
- Website: www.historicalsocietynigeria.org.ng

The Historical Society of Nigeria (HSN) is the oldest professional association of historians in Nigeria. It was founded at University College Ibadan (which is now known as the University of Ibadan), in 1955. Kenneth O. Dike and Abdullahi Smith were the founders.

The following year the society founded a professional journal, the Journal of the Historical Society of Nigeria, and later published a second journal, Tarikh, as well as quarterly bulletins. It also runs annual congresses.

Dike served as the inaugural president. By 1957, when the society's second annual congress was held at Ibadan, there were more than 350 members. The society is described as "one of the most energetic and illustrious of many such societies across the continent" for its activities during the 1950s and 1960s.
