= Applied history =

Application of historical events in present-day events

Military history being used to teach warfare by the US army in Tunisia, 2010

Applied history is the effort to apply insights grounded in the study of the past to the challenges of the present, particularly in the area of policy-making. Applied history is closely associated with the field of public history, and the terms today are sometimes used interchangeably, though historically, public history has been a more encompassing term, engaging a broad range of audiences, subjects and methods, while applied history has been more narrowly focused on work associated with the development of domestic and foreign policy.

== History ==
The term "applied history" was coined in 1909 by political scientist and historian Benjamin Shambaugh (1871-1940). A founding member of the Mississippi Valley Historical Association (today the Organization of American Historians), Shambaugh edited its proceedings from 1909 to 1914 and served as its president in 1909-1910. In 1912, Shambaugh, then superintendent of the State Historical Society of Iowa, launched the publication Applied History, a series that ran until 1930. Shambaugh defined applied history as "the use of the scientific knowledge of history and experience in efforts to solve present problems of human betterment." Examples included legislative reference work and policy analysis, as well as the creation and stewardship of public archives, and the practice of state and local history.

The Applied History series, and related efforts, lost funding during the Great Depression, and "applied history" as an enterprise receded until the 1970s, when it re-emerged in new contexts and forms. In 1974, Harvard University historian Ernest R. May published 'Lessons of the Past': The Use and Abuse Of History in American Foreign Policy, which argues that more substantive engagement with the discipline of history would improve policymaking. May together with Richard Neustadt taught courses in which students were invited to apply historical insight to contemporary social issues; in 1986 May and Neustadt published Thinking in Time: The Uses of History for Decision-Makers. In 1975, historians Joel Tarr and Peter Stearns launched an Applied History program at Carnegie-Mellon University in Pittsburgh. This Ph.D. program aimed to prepare students for jobs in a variety of public and private educational institutions. In the 1980s, the program changed its name from "Applied History" to "History and Policy".

== Academic focus ==
Today there are a number of academic programs in applied history. Shippensburg University hosts a Center for Applied History, and there is an Applied History Project at Harvard Kennedy School's Belfer Center for Science and International Affairs. In Flanders, KU Leuven and the State Archives of Belgium host project Corvus, which uses its research in applied history to develop, test and evaluate different types of historical consultancy. In November 2018, Dutch Historians Harm Kaal (Radboud University) and Jelle van Lottum (Huygens Institute for the History of the Netherlands) founded the Journal of Applied History, published by academic publisher Brill Publishers.

== Bibliography ==
- Conard, Rebecca (2002). Benjamin Shambaugh and the Intellectual Foundations of Public History. Iowa City: Iowa University Press.
- Davison, Graeme (1991). "Paradigms of Public History", in John Rickard and Peter Spearritt, eds, Packaging the Past? Public Histories Melbourne: Melbourne University Press.
- Percoco, James (October 1993). "History in the Making: The Development of a High School History Applied History Program". History News. Vol. 18, no. 5.
- Schroder, Alan M (1980). "Public History Makes the Scene In 1912." History News, Vol. 35, No. 6: 13-14.
- Stearns, Peter N (Aug 1981). "Applied History: A New-Old Departure". The History Teacher. 14 (4): 517–531. doi:10.2307/493687. JSTOR 493687.
- Tarr, Joel A. (Summer 1987). "Curriculum in Applied History: Toward the Future". The Public Historian. 9 (3): 111–125. doi:10.2307/3377191. JSTOR 3377191.
