= Obaro Ikime =

Nigerian historian (1936-2023)

Professor Obaro Ikime
- Born: 30 December 1936; Anibeze, Delta State, Nigeria
- Died: 25 April 2023 (aged 86); Ibadan, Oyo State, Nigeria
- Citizenship: Nigerian
- Education: University of Ibadan
- Occupations: Historian, author
- Writing career
- Language: English
- Notable works: Leadership in the 19th Century Africa, 1974, The Fall of Nigeria,1977, Groundwork of Nigerian History, 1980

Prof. Obaro Ikime (30 December 1936 – 25 April 2023) was a Nigerian historian. He was a published author. Obaro served as president of the Historical Society of Nigeria. He also served as a priest at the Anglican Church in Nigeria.

== Biography ==
=== Early life and education ===
Obaro had his secondary school education between 1950 and 1956 at Government College, Ughelli, Delta State, Nigeria. He proceeded to the University of Ibadan to study History Ikime with Second Class Honours (Upper Division).

=== Leadership ===
Obaro began serving in a leadership capacity as early as his secondary education, where he was appointed as the school prefect at Government College, Ughelli in Delta State.

=== Books ===
Obaro published books which include:

- Leadership in the 19th Century Africa, (1974)
- The Fall of Nigeria,1977
- Groundwork of Nigerian History, (1980)
- Can Anything Good Come Out of History? (2018)
