= Afro-pessimism (Africa) =

Perspective in African studies

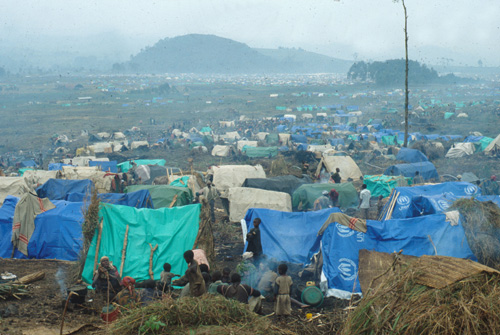
Rwandan refugees pictured in eastern Zaire after fleeing the 1994 Rwandan Genocide

In African studies, Afro-pessimism refers to a view popularised in the late 1980s and early 1990s which expressed doubt about the possibility of sustainable peace, democratization, and economic development in Sub-Saharan Africa.

Afro-pessimism was first coined by Michel Aurillac, Minister of Co-operation at the French Foreign Ministry, in an article for the Xinhua News Agency in 1988 as part of an article critical of the pessimistic stance of Western creditors.

Afro-pessimism argued that political, social, economic, and geopolitical trends across the African continent made significant progress towards economic development, democratization, and sustainable peace unlikely. The 1980s has been characterised as a "lost decade" in Africa as a result of economic stagnation. After the end of the Cold War, there were a number of major outbreaks of civil war and large-scale state collapses in Africa including as the Liberian Civil War (1989-1997), the collapse of the Barre regime in Somalia in 1991, the Rwandan Civil War (1990-1994) and Rwandan Genocide (1994), the Sierra Leone Civil War (1991-2002), Burundian Civil War (1993-2005), Congo-Brazzaville civil war (1993-1994) and the Second Congo War (1998-2003).

Pointing to the influence of Western media in cultivating the stereotypes, David F. Gordon and Howard Wolpe wrote in 1998:

Afro-pessimism is rooted, in part, in the negative realities of such failed and failing states as Liberia, Somalia, and Nigeria; in a raging AIDS epidemic that threatens to eliminate an entire generation of Africans; in the searing images of the brutal genocide in Rwanda; in the continent's runaway population growth. But it is also rooted in the tendency of the media to focus almost exclusively on this negative side of the African experience and to neglect the quieter stories of economic and democratic renewal.

According to the American policy analyst David Rieff, writing in 1998, the view held that "while Africa's promise remained undeniable" in view of its natural resources, "the continent was seen as the one part of the world for which the future was likely to be far worse than the past" after the decline of initial optimism following decolonisation in the 1960s and the sharp fall in living standards in the 1970s.

The term was largely repudiated by those considered to be adherents who instead preferred the term Afro-realism claiming to recognise genuine contemporary problems in Africa while also rejecting any suggestion of the impossibility of resolution or progress. Those who rejected Afro-pessimism sometimes embraced the label Afro-optimism.

== See also ==
- African Renaissance
- Africa Rising (2010s)
