= J. F. Ade Ajayi =

Nigerian historian (1929–2014)

3rd Vice chancellor of the University of Lagos
- In office 1972–1978
- Preceded by: Saburi Biobaku
- Succeeded by: Babatunde Kwaku Adadevoh

Personal details
- Born: 26 May 1929 Ikole, Southern Region, British Nigeria (now in Ekiti State, Nigeria)
- Died: 9 August 2014 (aged 85) Ibadan, Oyo State, Nigeria
- Scientific career
- Known for: Historiography in Africa
- Fields: African History
- Workplaces: University of Ibadan, University of Lagos

Jacob Festus Adeniyi Ajayi (26 May 1929 – 9 August 2014), commonly known as J. F. Ade Ajayi, was a Nigerian historian and a member of the Ibadan school, a group of scholars interested in introducing African perspectives to African history and focusing on the internal historical forces that shaped African lives. Ade Ajayi favours the use of historical continuity more often than focusing on events only as powerful agents of change that can move the basic foundations of cultures and mould them into new ones. Instead, he sees many critical events in African life, sometimes as weathering episodes which still leave some parts of the core of Africans intact. He also employs a less passionate style in his works, especially in his early writings, using subtle criticism of controversial issues of the times.

== Biography ==
Ajayi was born in Ikole-Ekiti on 26 May 1929, his father was a personal assistant of the Oba of Ikole during the era of Native Authorities. He started education at St Paul's School, Ikole, at the age of five. He then proceeded to Ekiti Central School (now Christ's School Ado Ekiti) for preparation as a pupil teacher. However, after hearing from a friend about Igbobi College in Lagos, he decided to try his luck and applied. Thereafter, he gained admission into the college, and equipped with a scholarship from the Ikole Ekiti Native authority, he went to Lagos for secondary education. After completing his studies at Igbobi, he gained admission to the University of Ibadan, where he was to pick between History, Latin or English for his degree. He chose History. In 1952, he travelled abroad and studied at Leicester University, under the tutelage of Professor Jack Simmons, a brilliant Oxford-trained historian. In 1956 he married Christie Ade Ajayi née Martins. After graduation, he was a research fellow at the Institute of Historical Research, London from 1957 to 1958. He later returned to Nigeria and joined the history department of the University of Ibadan.

In 1964, he was made dean of arts at the university and later promoted a deputy vice-chancellor. After his stint as deputy vice-chancellor, he was made the vice-chancellor of the University of Lagos in 1972. During his tenure, several buildings were constructed and improvements were made to student accommodation. King Jaja hall was built in 1973 and extensions were made to Queen Amina and Queen Moremi halls respectively. The twilight of his career as vice-chancellor was a controversial one, the then Obasanjo regime had introduced some student fees to the dismay of the students, who demanded free education. Students then decided to riot, a situation which was termed Ali must go. During the protest and riots, a student named Akintunde Ojo was shot by the police. At the time his mother was rumoured to be a mistress of Obasanjo. The ensuing protest by students against the killing led opportunists to seize the situation and cause mayhem. In 1978, he was arbitrarily relieved of his position and returned to Ibadan, where he continued his effort in historical scholarship.

In 1993, Ajayi was awarded the "Distinguished Africanist Award" by the African Studies Association. In 1994, he became an Honorary Fellow of SOAS University of London. On 9 August 2014, he died at the age of 85 and was buried in his native Ikole Ekiti.

== An early writer of African history ==
As an early writer of Nigerian and African history, though not a pioneer like Kenneth Dike, Ajayi brought considerable respect to the Ibadan School and African research. He is known for the arduous research and rigorous effort he puts into his work. By extensive use of oral sources in some of his works such as pre-twentieth century Yoruba history, he was able to weigh, balance and assay each and all of his sources, uncovering a pathway towards facts in the period which was scarce in written and non-prejudiced forms. Ajayi also tries to be dispassionate in his writings, especially when writing about controversial or passionate subjects in African history. In an article on the history of Yoruba writing, he was able to appraise critically and with resignation, Samuel Ajayi Crowther, a hero to Ade Ajayi. His style of rigorous research presented new pathways in African historiography and augmented awareness among scholarly circles outside the continent to African methodologies and perceptions. By weighing sources both written and oral, he was able to find new issues of interest that formed the basis of British colonisation of Lagos, balancing official British documentation of the event with additional material.

Another theme in many of his works is nationalism. Ajayi sees religious currents as setting the foundation for modern Nigerian nationalism. The Fulani Jihad of the early twentieth century set a basis for a common front, while Christian missionaries such as Christian Missionary Society (CMS), had laid the foundation for a movement towards unity in the south. The missionaries also established schools that created a new educated class who later broke with the Europeans and fought for a new social and political order. However, the new order embraced European contemporary social, political and economic structures as ideals of the new society.

Ajayi, however, with gradation has expressed a much more critical stance on the need to embrace Pan-Africanism as the foundation of nationalism.

== Works ==
- Yoruba Warfare in the Nineteenth century. Cambridge University Press, Cambridge, England 1964.
- Christian Missions in Nigeria, 1841–1891: The Making of a New elite.
- Editor, General History of Africa, vol. VI, UNESCO, 1989.
- Co-Editor, A Thousand Years of West African History.
- Co-Editor with Michael Crowder: History of West Africa, Longman, London 1971. ISBN 0-231-04103-9.
