= Kenneth Dike =

Nigerian historian

Kenneth Onwuka Dike
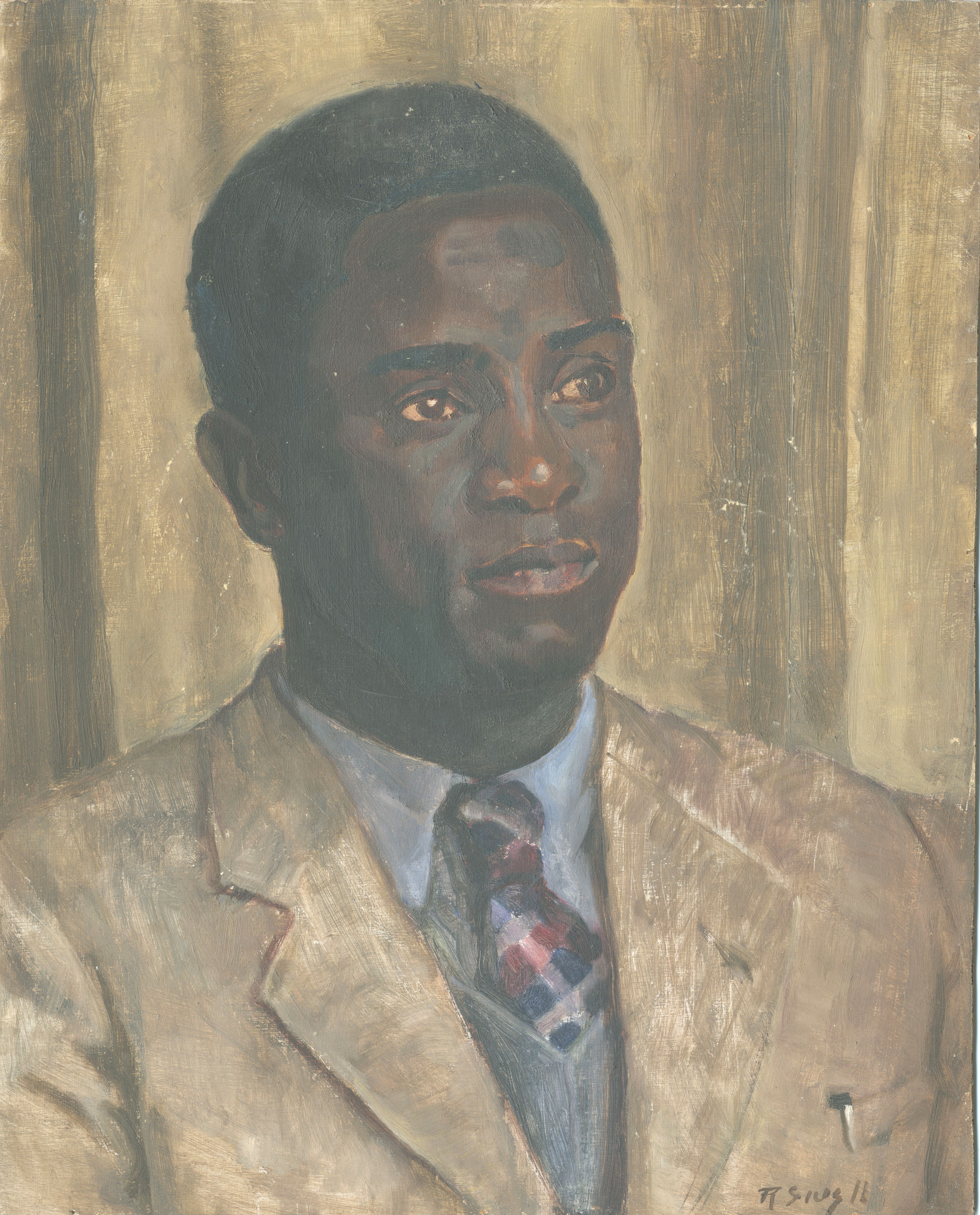
- Oil portrait of Kenneth Onwuka Dike as a young man, painted by Robert Sivell
- Born: 17 December 1917; Awka, Eastern Nigeria
- Died: 26 October 1983 (aged 65)
- Education: Durham University
- Occupation: Educationist
- Children: 5

Kenneth Onwuka Dike // (17 December 1917 – 26 October 1983) was a Nigerian educationist, historian and the second Nigerian vice-chancellor of the University of Ibadan.

During the Nigerian Civil War, he moved to Harvard University. He was a founder of the Ibadan School that dominated the writing of the History of Nigeria until the 1970s.

Dike was a pioneer in the movement towards utilising oral traditions in a multi-disciplinary approach in African historiography. He is credited with "having played the leading role in creating a generation of African historians who could interpret their own history without being influenced by Eurocentric approaches." He has been called the "father of modern African historiography".

== Career ==
Dike was born in Awka, Eastern Nigeria. He had his secondary education at Dennis Memorial Grammar School in Onitsha. He attended Fourah Bay College, Sierra Leone and also Durham University for his BSc, the University of Aberdeen for his MA, and King's College London for his PhD. During the 1960s, as a member of the University of Ibadan's history department, he played a pioneering role in promoting African leadership of scholarly works published on Africa. As the head of the organizing committee of the First International Congress of Africanists in Ghana in 1963, he sought for a strengthened meticulous non-colonial focused African research, publication of research in various languages including indigenous and foreign, so as to introduce native speakers to history and for people to view African history through a common eye. He was the first director of International School Ibadan. In 1965 he was elected chairman of the Association of Commonwealth Universities. Ebere Nwaubani argues that Dike was the first modern scholarly proponent of Africanist history. His publications were a watershed in African historiography. Dike has been described as the first African to get a PhD in history.

At the University College of Ibadan, he became the first African professor of history and head of a history department. He founded the Nigerian National Archives, and helped in the founding of the Historical Society of Nigeria. His book Trade and Politics in the Niger Delta 1830-1885 dealt with 19th-century economics and politics in the Niger Delta. He focused on internal African factors, especially defensive measures undertaken by the delta societies against imperialist penetration. Dike helped create the Ibadan School of African history and promoted the use of oral evidence by African historians. Dike was also the first president of ASUTECH (Anambra State University of Technology, now Nnamdi Azikiwe University).

== Publications ==
His publications include the following: Report on the Preservation and Administration of Historical Records in Nigeria (1953), Trade and Politics in the Niger Delta 1830-1885 (1956), A Hundred Years of British Rule in Nigeria (1957), and The Origins of the Niger Missions (1958).

A biography entitled Life and Thoughts of Professor Kenneth O. Dike was authored by Alexander Animalu.

== Personal life ==
He and his wife, Ona, had five children.

== Death ==
Dike died on the 26th of October 1983, at a hospital in Nigeria.

== Gallery ==
The opening of Sultan Bello Hall by Alhaji Sir Ahmadu Bello, University College Ibadan, on Second February 1962 (Kenneth Dike to the right of Sir Ahmadu Bello)

The opening of Sultan Bello Hall by Alhaji Sir Ahmadu Bello, University College Ibadan, on Second February 1962 (Kenneth Dike to the left, Ahmadu Bello to the right)

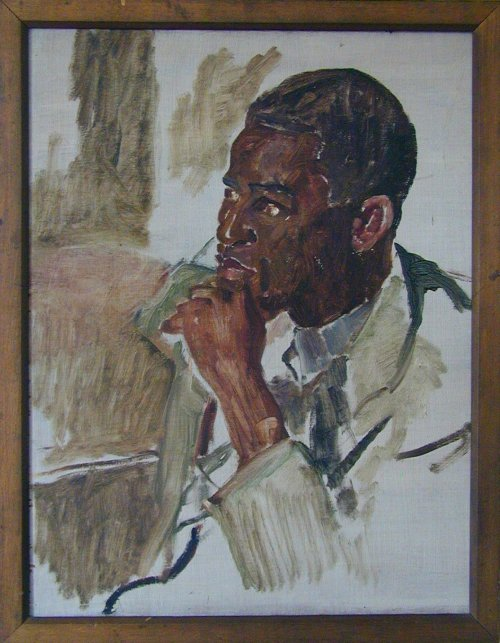
Kenneth Onwuka Dike as a university student at Aberdeen University
