= General History of Africa =

UNESCO African history project

The General History of Africa (GHA) is a two-phase project launched by UNESCO in 1964, producing a volume history of Africa first published in 1981 up to the present.

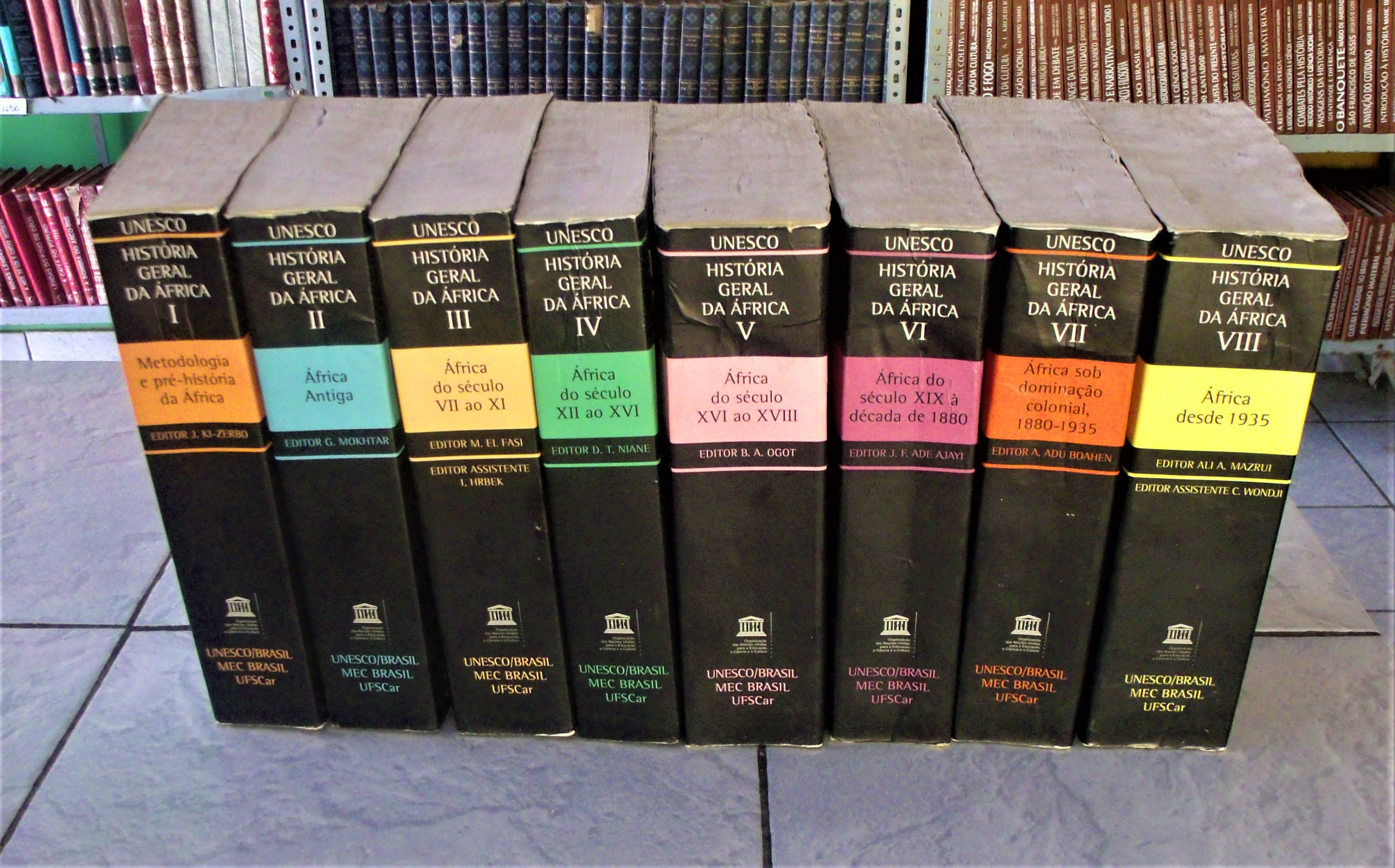
General History of Africa (in Portuguese)

The 1964 General Conference of UNESCO, during its 13th Session, instructed the Organization to undertake this initiative after the newly independent African member states expressed a strong desire to reclaim their cultural identity, to rectify widespread ignorance about their continent's history, and to break free of discriminatory prejudices.

Phase One, which began in 1964 and was completed in 1999, consisted of writing and publishing volumes 1–8 which highlight the shared heritage of the peoples of Africa.

Phase Two, which began in 2009, focuses on the elaboration of history curricula and pedagogical materials for primary and secondary schools on the basis of the eight volumes of the GHA. Phase Two also focuses on the promotion of the use and harmonization of the teaching of this collection in higher education institutions throughout the continent. Phase Two also concerns the implementation of these materials in schools in Africa and the diaspora. Volumes 9, 10, and 11 were released in 2025.

The objective of both Phase One and Phase Two of the project is to re-appropriate the interpretation and writing of African histories and to demonstrate the contribution of African cultures past and present to the history of humanity at large.

== Volumes and contributors ==
Editors are shown by (E), and assistant editors by (aE).

=== Volume 1: Methodology and African Historiography (1981) ===
Internet Archive link

| Chapter No. | Chapter Title | Author (and Nationality) |
|---|---|---|
| – | General Introduction | Joseph Ki-Zerbo (E) (Burkina Faso) (Note: Listed as being from the Republic of Upper Volta. This later became Burkina Faso in 1984.) |
| 1 | The development of African historiography | John Donnelly Fage (UK) |
| 2 | The place of history in African society | Boubou Hama (Niger) and Joseph Ki-Zerbo (Burkina Faso) |
| 3 | Recent trends in African historiography and their contribution to history in general | Philip Dearmond Curtin (US) |
| 4 | Sources and specific techniques used in African history: general outline | Théophile Obenga (Republic of the Congo) |
| 5 | Written sources before the fifteenth century | Hichem Djait (Tunisia) |
| 6 | Written sources from the fifteenth century onwards | Ivan Hrbek (Czech Republic) (Note: Listed as being from Czechoslovakia. In 1993 the country split into the Czech Republic and Slovakia.) |
| 7 | Oral tradition and its methodology | Jan Vansina (Belgium) |
| 8 | The living tradition | Amadou Hampâté Bâ (Mali) |
| 9 | African archeology and its techniques including dating techniques | Zaky Iskander (Egypt) |
| 10 | History and linguistics | Pathé Diagne (Senegal) |
| – | Editorial Note: Theories on the 'races' and history of Africa | Joseph Ki-Zerbo (E) (Burkina Faso) |
| 11 | Migrations and ethnic and linguistic differentiations | Dmitri Olderogge (Russia) (Note: Listed as being from the USSR, which devolved into separate states by 1991.) |
| 12 | African linguistic classification | Joseph Harold Greenberg (U.S.A.) |
| – | Appendix to Chapter 12: The language map of Africa | David Dalby (U.K.) |
| 13 | Historical geography: physical aspects | Sékouba Diarra (Mali) |
| 14 | Historical geography: economic aspects | Akin Ladipo Mabogunje (Nigeria) |
| 15 | The interdisciplinary methods adopted in this study | Joseph Ki-Zerbo (E) (Burkina Faso) |
| 16 | Chronological framework: African pluvial and glacial epochs | Rushdi Said (Egypt) and Hugues Faure (France) |
| 17 | Homonization: General problems | Yves Coppens (France) and Lionel Balout (France) |
| 18 | African fossil man | Richard Leakey (Kenya) (Note: Listed as British in the Volume itself.) |
| 19 | The prehistory of East Africa | John Edward Giles Sutton (U.K.) |
| 20 | The prehistory of Southern Africa | John Desmond Clark (U.S.A.) |
| 21 | The prehistory of Central Africa | Roger de Bayle des Hermens (France) and Francis Van Noten (Belgium) with Pierre de Maret (Belgium), Jan Moeyersons (Belgium), K. Muya and Emile Roche (France) |
| 22 | The prehistory of North Africa | Lionel Balout (France) |
| 23 | The prehistory of the Sahara | Henri Jean Hougot (France) |
| 24 | The prehistory of West Africa | Charles Thurstan Shaw (U.K.) |
| 25 | The prehistory of the Nile Valley | Fernand Debono (U.K.) |
| 26 | African prehistoric art | Joseph Ki-Zerbo (E) (Burkina Faso) |
| 27 | The origins, development and expansion of agricultural techniques | Roland Portères (France) and Jacques Barrau (France) |
| 28 | Discovery and diffusion of metals and the development of social systems until the fifth century before the Christian era | Jean Vercoutter (France) |
| – | Conclusion: From nature in the raw to liberated humanity | Joseph Ki-Zerbo (E) (Burkina Faso) |

=== Volume 2: Ancient Civilizations of Africa (1981) ===
Internet Archive link

| Chapter No. | Chapter Title | Author (and Nationality) |
|---|---|---|
| – | Introduction | Gamal Eddin Mokhtar (E) (Egypt) with Jean Vercoutter (France) |
| 1 | Origin of the Ancient Egyptians | Cheikh Anta Diop (Senegal) |
| – (Note: The Arabic, French, Portuguese and Spanish versions of this volume move this chapter to end of the book, after the conclusion.) | Annex to Chapter 1: Report on the symposium on 'The Peopling of Ancient Egypt and the Deciphering of the Meroitic Script' (Cairo, 28 January-3 February 1974) | |
| 2 | Pharaonic Egypt | Abdel Moneim Abu Bakr (Egypt) |
| 3 | Pharaonic Egypt: society, economy and culture | Jean Yoyotte (France) |
| 4 | Egypt's relations with the rest of Africa | Abd el Hamid Zayid (Egypt) with Jean Devisse (France) |
| 5 | The legacy of Pharaonic Egypt | Rashid El Nadoury (Egypt) with Jean Vercoutter (France) |
| 6 | Egypt in the Hellenistic era | Henry Riad (Egypt) with Jean Devisse (France) |
| 7 | Egypt under Roman domination | Sergio Donadoni (Italy) |
| 8 | The importance of Nubia: a link between Central Africa and the Mediterranean | S. Adam (Egypt) with Jean Vercoutter (France) |
| 9 | Nubia before Napata (−3100 to −750) | Negm-el-Din Mohammed Sherif (Sudan) |
| 10 | The Empire of Kush: Napata and Meroë | Jean Leclant (France) |
| 11 | The civilization of Napata and Meroë | Ahmed Ali Hakem (Sudan) with Ivan Hrbek (Czech Republic) and Jean Vercoutter (France) |
| 12 | The spreading of Christianity in Nubia | Kazimierz Michałowski (Poland) |
| 13 | Pre-Axumite culture | H. de Contension (France) |
| 14 | The civilization of Axum from the first to the seventh century | Francis Anfray (France) |
| 15 | Axum: political system, economics and culture, first to fourth century | Yuri Mikhailovich Kobishanov (Russia) (Note: Listed as being from the USSR, which devolved into separate states by 1991.) |
| 16 | Christian Axum | Tekle Tsadik Mekouria (Ethiopia) |
| 17 | The proto-Berbers | Jehan Desanges (France) |
| 18 | The Carthaginian period | Brian Herbert Warmington (U.K.) |
| 19 | The Roman and post-Roman period in North Africa | Ammar Mahjoubi (Tunisia) and Pierre Salama (France) (Note: Listed as being from the Algeria in the volume itself.) |
| 20 | The Sahara in classical antiquity | Pierre Salama (France) |
| 21 | Introduction to the later prehistory of Sub-Saharan Africa | Merrick Posnansky (U.K.) |
| 22 | The East African coast and its role in maritime trade | Abdul Sheriff (Tanzania) |
| 23 | East Africa before the seventh century | John Edward Giles Sutton (U.K.) |
| 24 | West Africa before the seventh century | Bassey Wai-Andah (Nigeria) |
| 25 | Central Africa | Francis Van Noten (Belgium) with Daniel Cahen (Belgium) and Pierre de Maret (Belgium) |
| 26 | Southern Africa: hunters and food-gatherers | John Parkington (U.K.) |
| 27 | The beginnings of the Iron Age in Southern Africa | David Walter Phillipson (U.K.) |
| 28 | Madagascar | Pierre Vérin (France) |
| 29 | The societies of Africa south of the Sahara in the Early Iron Age | Merrick Posnansky (U.K.) |
| – | Conclusion | Gamal Eddin Mokhtar (Egypt) |

=== Volume 3: Africa from the Seventh to the Eleventh Century (1988) ===
Internet Archive link

| Chapter No. | Chapter Title | Author (and Nationality) |
|---|---|---|
| 1 | Africa in the context of world history | Ivan Hrbek (aE) (Czech Republic) |
| 2 | The coming of Islam and the expansion of the Muslim empire | Muhammad al-Fasi (E) (Morocco) and Ivan Hrbek (aE) (Czech Republic) |
| 3 | Stages in the development of Islam and its dissemination in Africa | Muhammad al-Fasi (E) (Morocco) and Ivan Hrbek (aE) (Czech Republic) |
| 4 | Islam as a social system in Africa since the seventh century | Zakari Dramani-Issifou (Benin) |
| 5 | The peoples of the Sudan: Population movements | Francois de Medeiros (Benin) |
| 6 | The Bantu-speaking peoples and their expansion | Samwiri Lwanga-Lunyiigo (Uganda) and Jan Vansina (Belgium) |
| 7 | Egypt from the Arab conquest until the end of the Fatimid state (1171) | Thierry Bianquis (France) |
| 8 | Christian Nubia at the height of its civilization | Stefan Jakobielski (Poland) |
| 9 | The conquest of North Africa and the Berber resistance | H. Mones (Egypt) |
| 10 | The independence of the Maghrib | Mohamed Talbi (Tunisia) |
| 11 | The role of the Sahara and Saharians in relationships between North and South | Tadeusz Lewicki (Poland) |
| 12 | The emergence of the Fatimids | Ivan Hrbek (aE) (Czech Republic) |
| 13 | The Almovarids | Ivan Hrbek (aE) (Czech Republic) and Jean Devisse (France) |
| 14 | Trade and trade routes in West Africa | Jean Devisse (France) |
| 15 | The Chad region as a crossroads | Dierk Lange (Germany) and Bawuro Barkindo (Nigeria) |
| 16 | The Guinea zone: General situation | Thurston Shaw (U.K.) |
| 17 | The Guinean belt: The peoples between Mount Cameroon and the Ivory Coast | Bassey Wai Andah (Nigeria) with James Anquandah (Ghana) |
| 18 | The peoples of Upper Guinea (between Ivory Coast and the Casamance) | Bassey Wai Andah (Nigeria) |
| 19 | The Horn of Africa | Tekle-Tsadik Mekouria (Ethiopia) |
| 20 | Ethiopia's relations with the Muslim world | Enrico Cerulli (Italy) |
| 21 | The East African coast and the Comoro Islands | Fidelis T. Masao (Tanzania) and Henry W. Mutoro (Kenya) |
| 22 | The East African interior | Christopher Ehret (U.S.A.) |
| 23 | Central Africa to the north of the Zambezi | David Walter Phillipson (U.K.) |
| 24 | Southern Africa to the south of the Zambezi | Thomas N. Huffman (U.S.A.) |
| 25 | Madagascar | Madame Bakoly Domenichini-Ramiaramanana (Madagascar) |
| 26 | The African diaspora in Asia | Yusof Talib (Singapore) with F. El-Samir (Iraq) |
| 27 | Relations between different regions of Africa | Abdoulaye Bathily (Senegal) with Claude Meillassoux (France) |
| 28 | Africa from the seventh to the eleventh century: Five formative centuries | Jean Devisse (France) and Jan Vansina (Belgium) |

=== Volume 4: Africa from the Twelfth to the Sixteenth Century (1984) ===
Internet Archive link

| Chapter No. | Chapter Title | Author (and Nationality) |
|---|---|---|
| 1 | Introduction | Djibril Tamsir Niane (E) (Guinea) (Note: Listed as being from Senegal.) |
| 2 | The unification of the Maghreb under the Alhomads | O. Saidi (Tunisia) |
| 3 | The spread of civilization in the Maghreb and its impact on Western civilization | Mohamed Talbi (Tunisia) |
| 4 | The disintegration of the political unity of the Maghreb | Ivan Hrbek (Czech Republic) |
| 5 | Society in the Maghrib after the disappearance of the Alhomads | R. Idris (France) |
| 6 | Mali and the second Mandingo expansion | Djibril Tamsir Niane (E) (Guinea) |
| 7 | The decline of the Mali empire | Madina Ly-Tall (Mali) |
| 8 | The Songhay from the 12th to the 16th century | Sékéné Mody Cissoko (Senegal) |
| 9 | The peoples and kingdoms of the Niger Bend and the Volta basin from the 12th to 16th century | Michel Izard (France) |
| 10 | The kingdoms and peoples of Chad | Dierk Lange (Germany) |
| 11 | The Hausa and their neighbours in central Sudan | Mahdi Adamu (Nigeria) with André Salifou (Niger) |
| 12 | The coastal peoples: From Casamance to the Ivory Coast lagoons | Yves Person (France) |
| 13 | From the Ivory Coast lagoons to the Volta | Pierre Kipré (Ivory Coast) |
| 14 | From the Volta to the Cameroon | Alan Frederick Charles Ryder (U.K.) |
| 15 | Egypt and the Muslim world | Jean-Claude Garcin (France) |
| 16 | Nubia from the late 12th century to the Funj conquest in the early 15th century | Luboš Kropáček (Czech Republic) |
| 17 | The Horn of Africa: The Solomonids in Ethiopia and the states of the Horn of Africa | Taddesse Tamrat (Ethiopia) |
| 18 | The development of Swahili civilization | Victor V. Matveiev (U.S.S.R.) |
| 19 | Between the coast and the great lakes | Christopher Ehret (U.S.A.) |
| 20 | The Great Lakes region | Bethwell Allan Ogot (Kenya) |
| 21 | The Zambezi and Limpopo basins: 1100–1500 | Brian Murray Fagan (U.K.) |
| 22 | Equatorial Africa and Angola: Migrations and the emergence of the first states | Jan Vansina (Belgium) |
| 23 | Southern Africa: Its peoples and social structures | Leonard Diniso Ngcongco (Botswana) with Jan Vansina (Belgium) |
| 24 | Madagascar and the neighbouring islands from the 12th to the 16th century | Faranirina Esoavelomandroso (Madagascar) |
| 25 | Relationships and exchanges among the different groups | Djibril Tamsir Niane (E) (Guinea) |
| 26 | Africa in inter-continental relations | Jean Devisse (France) with S. Labib (Egypt) |
| 27 | Conclusion | Djibril Tamsir Niane (E) (Guinea) |

=== Volume 5: Africa from the Sixteenth to the Eighteenth Century (1992) ===
Internet Archive link

| Chapter No. | Chapter Title | Author (and Nationality) |
|---|---|---|
| 1 | The struggle for international trade and its implications for Africa | Marian Małowist (Poland) |
| 2 | African political, economic and social structures during this period | Pathé Diagne (Senegal) |
| 3 | Population movements and the emergence of new social-political forms in Africa | Jan Vansina (Belgium) |
| 4 | Africa in world history: the export slave trade from Africa and the emergence of an Atlantic economic order | Joseph E. Inikori (Nigeria) |
| 5 | The African diaspora in the old and new worlds | Joseph E. Harris (U.S.A.) |
| 6 | The Ottoman conquest of Egypt | Rudolf Veselý (Czechoslovakia) |
| 7 | The Sudan, 1500–1800 | Yusuf Fadl Hasan (Sudan) and Bethwell Allan Ogot (E) (Kenya) |
| 8 | Morocco | Mohammad El Fasi (Morocco) |
| 9 | Algeria, Tunisia and Libya: The Ottomans and their heirs | Mohamed Hédi Chérif (Tunisia) |
| 10 | Senegambia from the sixteenth to the eighteenth century: evolution of the Wolof, Sereer and Tukuloor | Boubacar Barry (Senegal) |
| 11 | The end of the Songhay empire | Michel Abitbol (Israel) |
| 12 | From the Niger to the Volta | Michel Izard (France) and Joseph Ki-Zerbo (Burkina Faso) |
| 13 | The states and cultures of the Upper Guinea coast | Christophe Wondji (Ivory Coast) |
| 14 | The states and cultures of the Lower Guinea coast | Albert Adu Boahen (Ghana) |
| 15 | Fon and Yoruba: the Niger delta and Cameroon | Ebiegberi Joe Alagoa (Nigeria) |
| 16 | The Hausa states | Diouldé Laya (Niger) |
| 17 | Kanem-Borno: its relations with the Mediterranean sea, Bagirmi and other states in the Chad basin | Bawuro M. Barkindo (Nigeria) |
| 18 | From the Cameroon grasslands to the Upper Nile | Elikia M'Bokolo (Democratic Republic of Congo) (Note: Listed as being from Zaire. This later became the Democratic Republic of Congo in 1997.) |
| 19 | The Kongo kingdom and its neighbours | Jan Vansina (Belgium) based on a contribution by Theophile Obenga (Republic of Congo) |
| 20 | The political system of the Luba and Lunda: its emergence and expansion | Isidore Ndaywel è Nziem (Democratic Republic of Congo) (Note: Listed as being from Zaire. This later became the Democratic Republic of Congo in 1997.) |
| 21 | The northern Zambezia-Lake Malawi region | Kings Mbacazwa Phiri (Malawi), Owen J. M. Kalinga (Malawi) and Hoyini H. K. Bhila (Zimbabwe) |
| 22 | Southern Zambezia | Hoyini H. K. Bhila (Zimbabwe) |
| 23 | Southern Africa | Donald Denoon (U.K.) |
| 24 | The Horn of Africa | Eike Haberland (Germany) |
| 25 | East Africa: The coast | Ahmed Idha Salim (Kenya) |
| 26 | The Great Lakes region: 1500–1800 | James Bertin Webster (Canada), Bethwell Allan Ogot (E) (Kenya) and Jean-Pierre Chrétien (France) |
| 27 | The interior of East Africa: The peoples of Kenya and Tanzania, 1500–1800 | William Robert Ochieng (Kenya) |
| 28 | Madagascar and the islands of the Indian Ocean | Raymond K. Kent (U.S.A.) |
| 29 | The historical development of African societies, 1500–1800: Conclusion | Bethwell Allan Ogot (E) (Kenya) |

=== Volume 6: Africa from the Nineteenth century until the 1880s (1989) ===
Internet Archive link

| Chapter No. | Chapter Title | Author (and Nationality) |
|---|---|---|
| 1 | Africa at the beginning of the nineteenth century: Issues and prospects | Jacob Festus Ade Ajayi (E) (Nigeria) |
| 2 | Africa and the world economy | Immanuel Wallerstein (U.S.A.) |
| 3 | New trends and processes in Africa in the nineteenth century | Albert Adu Boahen (Ghana) |
| 4 | The abolition of the slave trade | Serge Daget (France) |
| 5 | The Mfecane and the rise of the new African states | Leonard Diniso Ngcongco (Botswana) |
| 6 | The impact of Mfecane on the Cape colony | Elleck Kufakunesu Mashingaidze (Zimbabwe) |
| 7 | The British, Boers and Africans in South Africa, 1850–80 | Ngwabi Mulunge Bhebe (Zimbabwe) |
| 8 | The countries of the Zambezi basin | Allen F. Isaacman (U.S.A.) |
| 9 | The East African coast and hinterland, 1800–45 | Ahmed Idha Salim (Kenya) |
| 10 | The East African coast and hinterland, 1845–80 | Isaria Ndelahiyosa Kimambo (Tanzania) |
| 11 | Peoples and states of the Great Lakes region | David William Cohen (U.S.A.) |
| 12 | The Congo basin and Angola | Jean-Luc Vellut (Belgium) |
| 13 | The renaissance of Egypt, 1805–81 | Anouar Abdel-Malek (Egypt) |
| 14 | The Sudan in the nineteenth century | H. A. Ibrahim (Sudan) with Bethwell Allan Ogot (Kenya) |
| 15 | Ethiopia and Somalia | Richard Pankhurst (U.K.) with Lee V. Cassanelli (U.S.A.) |
| 16 | Madagascar 1800–80 | Phares Mukasa Mutibwa (Uganda) with Faranirina V. Esoavelomandroso (Madagascar) |
| 17 | New trends in the Maghreb: Algeria, Tunisia and Libya | Mohamed Hédi Chérif (Tunisia) |
| 18 | Morocco from the beginning of the nineteenth century to 1880 | Abdallah Laroui (Morocco) |
| 19 | New patterns of European intervention in the Maghreb | Nikolay A. Ivanov (U.S.S.R.) |
| 20 | The Sahara in the nineteenth century | Stephen Baier (U.S.A.) |
| 21 | The nineteenth-century Islamic revolutions in West Africa | Aziz A. Batran (Sudan) |
| 22 | The Sokoto caliphate and Borno | Murray Last (U.K.) |
| 23 | Massina and Torodbe (Tukuloor) empire until 1878 | Madina Ly-Tall (Mali) |
| 24 | States and peoples of Senegambia and Upper Guinea | Y. Person (France) |
| 25 | States and peoples of the Niger Bend and the Volta | Kwame Arhin (Ghana) and Joseph Ki-Zerbo (Burkina Faso) |
| 26 | Dahomy, Yorubaland, Borgu and Benin in the nineteenth century | Anthony Ijaola Asiwaju (Nigeria) |
| 27 | The Niger delta and the Cameroon region | Ebiegberi Joe Alagoa (Nigeria) with Lovett Zephaniah Elango (Cameroon) and Nicolas Metegue N'nah (Gabon) |
| 28 | The African diaspora | Franklin W. Knight (Jamaica) with Yusof Talib (Singapore) and Philip D. Curtin (U.S.A.) |
| 29 | Conclusion: Africa on the eve of the European conquest | Jacob Festus Adeniyi Ajayi (E) (Nigeria) |

=== Volume 7: Africa under colonial domination, 1880–1935 (1985) ===
Internet Archive link

| Chapter No. | Chapter Title | Author (and Nationality) |
|---|---|---|
| 1 | Africa and the colonial challenge | Albert Adu Boahen (E) (Ghana) |
| 2 | European partition and conquest of Africa: An overview | Godfrey Nwanoruo Uzoigwe (Nigeria) |
| 3 | African initiatives and resistance in the face of partition and conquest | Terence Osborn Ranger (U.K.) |
| 4 | African initiatives and resistance in North-East Africa | H. A. Ibrahim (Sudan) with Abbas I. Ali (Sudan) |
| 5 | African initiatives and resistance in North Africa and the Sahara | Abdallah Laroui (Morocco) |
| 6 | African initiatives and resistance in West Africa, 1880–1914 | M'Baye Gueye (Senegal) and Albert Adu Boahen (E) (Ghana) |
| 7 | African initiatives and resistance in East Africa, 1880–1914 | Henry A. Mwanzi (Kenya) |
| 8 | African initiatives and resistance in Central Africa, 1880–1914 | Allen F. Isaacman (U.S.A.) and Jan Vansina (Belgium) |
| 9 | African initiatives and resistance in Southern Africa | David Chanaiwa (Zimbabwe) |
| 10 | Madagascar, 1880s–1930s: African initiatives and reaction to colonial conquest and domination | M. Esoavelomandroso (Madagascar) |
| 11 | Liberia and Ethiopia, 1880–1914: The survival of two African states | M. B. Akpan (Nigeria) with A. B. Jones (Liberia) and Richard Pankhurst (U.K.) |
| 12 | The First World War and its consequences | Michael Crowder (U.K.) |
| 13 | Methods and institutions of European domination | R. F. Betts (U.S.A.) with Anthony Ijaola Asiwaju (Nigeria) (Note: Mistakenly listed as "M. Asiwaju" in the contents page.) |
| 14 | The colonial economy | Walter Rodney (Guyana) |
| 15 | The colonial economy of the former French, Belgian and Portuguese zones, 1914–35 | Catherine Coquery-Vidrovitch (France) |
| 16 | The colonial economy: The former British zones | Martin H. Y. Kaniki (Tanzania) |
| 17 | The colonial economy: North Africa | Ahmed Kassab (Tunisia), A. A. Abdussalam (Libya) and F. S. Abusedra (Egypt) |
| 18 | The social repercussions of colonial rule: Demographic aspects | John Charles Caldwell (Australia) |
| 19 | The social repercussions of colonial rule: The new social structures | Adiele Eberechukwu Afigbo (Nigeria) |
| 20 | Religion in Africa during the colonial era | Kofi Asare Opoku (Ghana) |
| 21 | The arts in Africa during the period of colonial rule | Wole Soyinka (Nigeria) |
| 22 | African politics and nationalism, 1919–35 | B. Olatunji Oloruntimehin (Nigeria) |
| 23 | Politics and nationalism in North-East Africa, 1919–35 | H. A. Ibrahim (Sudan) |
| 24 | Politics and nationalism in the Maghrib and the Sahara, 1919–35 | Jacques Berque (France) |
| 25 | Politics and nationalism in West Africa, 1919–35 | Albert Adu Boahen (E) (Ghana) |
| 26 | Politics and nationalism in East Africa, 1919–35 | Eisha Stephen Atieno Odhiambo (Kenya) |
| 27 | Politics and nationalism in Central and Southern Africa, 1919–35 | Apollon Borisovich Davidson (Russia) (Note: Listed as being from the USSR, which devolved into separate states by 1991.), Allen Isaacman (U.S.A.) and R. Pélissier (France) |
| 28 | Ethiopia and Liberia, 1914–35: Two independent African states in the colonial era | M. B. Akpan (Nigeria) with A. B. Jones (Liberia) and Richard Pankhurst (U.K.) |
| 29 | Africa and the New World | R. D. Ralston (U.S.A.) with Fernando Augusto Albuquerque Mourão (Brazil) |
| 30 | Colonialism in Africa: Its impact and significance | Albert Adu Boahen (E) (Ghana) |
| – | – | Y. Kwarteng (Ghana) (Editorial assistant) |

=== Volume 8: Africa since 1935 (1993) ===
Internet Archive link

| Chapter No. | Chapter Title | Author (and Nationality) |
|---|---|---|
| 1 | Introduction | Ali Al'amin Mazrui (E) (Kenya) |
| 2 | The Horn and North Africa, 1935–45: Crises and change | Tayeb Chenntouf (Algeria) |
| 3 | Tropical and equatorial Africa under French, Portuguese and Spanish domination, 1935–45 | Majhemout Diop (Senegal) with David Birmingham (U.K.), Ivan Hrbek (Czech Republic), Alfredo Margarido (Portugal) and Djibril Tamsir Niane (Guinea) |
| 4 | Africa under British and Belgium domination, 1935–45 | Michael Crowder (U.K.) |
| 5 | Seek ye first the political kingdom | Ali Al'amin Mazrui (E) (Kenya) |
| 6 | North Africa and the Horn | Ivan Hrbek (Czech Republic) |
| 7 | West Africa, 1945–60 | Jean Suret-Canale (France) and Albert Adu Boahen (Ghana) |
| 8 | Equatorial West Africa | Elikia M'Bokolo (Democratic Republic of Congo) (Note: Listed as being from Zaire. This later became the Democratic Republic of Congo in 1997.) |
| 9 | The struggle for political sovereignty in Eastern Africa, 1945 to independence | Michael Twaddle (U.K.) with Lucile Rabearimanana (Madagascar) and Isaria Ndelahiyosa Kimambo (Tanzania) |
| 10 | Southern Africa since 1945 | David Chanaiwa (Zimbabwe) |
| 11 | Economic changes in Africa in the world context | Catherine Coquery-Vidrovitch (France) |
| 12 | Agriculture and rural development since 1935 | Maxwell Owusu (Ghana) |
| 13 | Industrial development and urban growth, 1935–80 | Pierre Kipré (Ivory Coast) |
| 14 | Comparative strategies of economic decolonization in Africa | Adebayo Adedeji (Nigeria) |
| 15 | Nation-building and changing political structures | Jonah Isawa Elaigwu (Nigeria) with Ali Al'amin Mazrui (Kenya) |
| 16 | Nation-building and changing political values | Joseph Ki-Zerbo (Burkina Faso), Ali Al'amin Mazrui (Kenya) and Christophe Wondji (Ivory Coast) with Albert Adu Boahen (Ghana) |
| 17 | Religion and social evolution | Tshishiku Tshibangu (Democratic Republic of Congo) (Note: Listed as being from Zaire. This later became the Democratic Republic of Congo in 1997.)with Jacob Festus Ade Ajayi (Nigeria) and Lemin Sanneh (Ghana) |
| 18 | Language and social change | Alfa Ibrahima Sow (Guinea) and Mohamed Hassan Abdulaziz (Ghana) |
| 19 | The development of modern literature since 1935 | Ali Al'amin Mazrui (E) (Kenya) with Mario de Andrade (Angola), M'hamed Alaoui Abdalaoui (Morocco), Daniel P. Kunene (South Africa) and Jan Vansina (Belgium) |
| 20 | Arts and society since 1935 | Jan Vansina (Belgium) |
| 21 | Trends in philosophy and science in Africa | Ali Al'amin Mazrui (E) (Kenya) and Jacob Festus Ade Ajayi (Nigeria) with Albert Adu Boahen (Ghana) and Tshishiku Tshibangu (Democratic Republic of Congo) |
| 22 | Education and social change | Aklilu Habte (Ethiopia) and Teshome Wagaw (Ethiopia) (Note: Mistakenly listed as being from the United States.) with Jacob Festus Ade Ajayi (Nigeria) |
| 23 | Africa and its diaspora since 1935 | Joseph E. Harris (U.S.A.) with Slimane Zeghidour (Algeria) |
| 24 | Pan-Africanism and regional integration | Samuel Kingsley Botwe Asante (Ghana) with David Chanaiwa (Zimbabwe) |
| 25 | Pan-Africanism and Liberation | Edem Kodjo (Togo) and David Chanaiwa (Zimbabwe) |
| 26 | Africa and the capitalist countries | Chinweizu (Nigeria) |
| 27 | Africa and the socialist countries | Iba Der Thiam (Senegal) and James Mulira (Uganda) with Christophe Wondji (Ivory Coast) |
| 28 | Africa and the developing regions | Locksley Edmonson (Jamaica) |
| 29 | Africa and the United Nations since 1945 | Edmund Kwam Kouassi (Togo) |
| 30 | Toward the year 2000 | Ali Al'amin Mazrui (E) (Kenya) |

=== Volume 9: General History of Africa Revisited (2025) ===
UNESDOC link

| Chapter No. | Chapter Title | Author |
|---|---|---|
Section I: Writing History of Africans and their Diasporas Today: Some Epistemological Considerations
| – | Introduction | Olabiyi Yai and Martial Ze Belinga |
| 1 | Decolonizing History: Epistemology of a Creative Destruction | Martial Ze Belinga |
| 2 | The History of Africa in the Diaspora: Epistemological and Ideological Barriers | Yoporeka Somet |
| 3 | The Concept of Africa and History of Africa | Salim Abdelmadjid |
| 4 | Afro-China Relations before 1500 | Anshan Li |
| 5 | Japanese Epistemology and African History | Katsuhiko Kitagawa |
| 6 | Speaking of History in African Languages | Olabiyi Yai |
| 7 | Nouns and Verbs of History in Ancient Egyptian | Alain Anselin |
| 8 | The Word Africa and its Strategic Challenges: from Heterogenous Assignation to Endogenous Assumption | Charles Binam Bikoi |
| 9 | Orality and the Writing of African History: Towards a New Epistemology | Bonaventure Mve Ondo |
| 10 | Oral Traditions — Sources of an Updated African Historiography: Assessment and Perspectives | Theodore Nicoue Gayibor |
| 11 | Tantara: Madagascar's African Historical Tradition | Manasse Esoavelomandroso |
| 12 | Cosmogonies, Visions of the World, Ancient Imaginaries: Life Stories of the Peoples of Africa | Cheikh Moctar |
| 13 | Symbolic African Dances, Drumming, Songs and Language, and the Preservation of the Past | Kofi Anyidoho |
| 14 | Denominations and Disciplinary Status of African Literatures in European Languages | Luís Kandjimbo |
| 15 | Isese L'Agba: The Rite and Process of the Apotheosis in Afro-Brazilian and Afro-Latin American Yoruba Diaspora Traditions | Felix Ayoh'Omidire |
| 16 | Concepts in African Religious and Philosophical Traditions | Sanya Osha |
| 17 | African Written Forms: Facts, Re-evaluations and an Epistemological Break with the Past Towards a Semiotic and Discursive Approach | Mlaili Condro |
| 18 | Epigraphy and the Understanding of the African Past | Paulo de Moraes Farias |
| 19 | Tangible and Intangible Heritage and New Approaches of African History | Herman Kiriama |
| 20 | Afro America: Africa and the Arts | Yolanda Wood |
| 21 | Historical Sciences and the Multidisciplinary Imperative | Augustin Holl (E) |
Section II: Review of the General History of Africa: Volumes I–VIII
| – | Introduction | Abdoulaye Konaté |
| 1 | Methodology and African Prehistory: General History of Africa Volume I | Augustin Holl (E) |
| 2 | Ancient Civilizations of Africa: General History of Africa Volume II | Alain Anselin |
| 3 | Africa from the 7th to the 11th Century: General History of Africa Volume III | Idrissa Ba |
| 4 | Africa from the 12th to the 16th Century: General History of Africa Volume IV | Alexis Adandé |
| 5 | Africa from the 16th to the 18th Century: General History of Africa Volume V | Thiago Henrique Mota |
| 6 | Africa in the 19th Century until the 1880s: General History of Africa Volume VI | Catherine Coquery-Vidrovitch |
| 7 | Africa under Colonial Domination: General History of Africa Volume VII | Faranirina Rajaonah |
| 8 | Africa since 1935: General History of Africa Volume VIII | Muryatan Barbosa |
Section III: The Initial History of Africa: An Update
| – | Introduction | Augustin Holl (E) |
| 1 | Paleoclimatic and Paleoenvironmental Research in Africa | Anne-Marie Lezine |
| 2 | The Genealogical Connections of Africa’s Regions: The Y Chromosome Evidence | Shomarka Keita |
| 3 | Linguistic Map and Classification of African Languages | Roger Blench |
| 4 | West of the Rift Valley in Chad, Central Africa: The First Two Mio-Pliocene Hominids | Michel Brunet, Mackaye Hassane Taïsso, Andossa Likius, and Patrick Vignaud |
| 5 | Gathering, Scavenging and Hunting: Lifestyles of Hominids | Jason E. Lewis |
| 6 | The First Cutting Tools and Stone Tool Cultures | Hélène Roche |
| 7 | The First Lithic Assemblages and Cultural Complexes: Description and Distribution | Obarè Bagodo |
| 8 | Adaptations of Societies in Africa from the Late Pleistocene to the Early Holocene | Latifa Sari |
| 9 | The Emergence and Development of Food-Producing Economies | Augustin Holl (E) |
| 10 | Genesis and Development of Pastoralism in Sahara and North Africa | Savino di Lernia |
| 11 | The Advent of Domestication in Eastern and Southern Africa | Felix A. Chami |
| 12 | African Foundations of Ancient Egypt: A Social and Archaeological Perspective | David Wengrow |
| 13 | Megaliths of Nabta Playa: Ritual Complex and Astronomical Observatory | Hebat Allah Ibrahim |
| 14 | Populations of Pharaonic Egypt: Genetic Characteristics Disclosed by Ancient DNA Research | Jean-Philippe Gourdine |
| 15 | Kinship and Social Structure in Kemet, Ancient Egypt | Kimani Nehusi |
| 16 | The Invention of Pottery in Africa and the Context in Which It Appeared | Eric Huysecom |
| 17 | African Metallurgies | Hamady Bocoum |
| 18 | The Emergence of Complex Societies and Urbanization in Africa | Graham Connah |
| 19 | The Growth of Socio-political Complexity in the Northern Horn of Africa | Matthew Curtis and Peter Schmidt |
| 20 | East Africa and the Indian Ocean Networks (1st-15th Century) | Philippe Beaujard |
| 21 | The Emergence of Social Complexity in the Great Lakes Region | Peter Robertshaw |
Section IV: Ancient and Modern History of Africa: An Update
| – | Introduction | Augustin Holl (E) |
| 1 | Population Growth in the Inner Niger Delta (Mali) Prior to the Formation of the Great Empires | Mamadi Dembélé |
| 2 | Political Constructions in Madagascar: From Their Origins to the 19th Century | Manasse Esoavelomandroso |
| 3 | Modalities of Enslavement in South Central Africa (18th-19th Century) | Isabel Castro Henriques |
| 4 | Slave Trade and Resistance in Senegambia | Ismaila Ciss |
| 5 | Confrontation, Collaboration and Rebellion: Resistance Strategies and Enslavement in Central Africa | Idrissou Alioum and Ahmadou Sehou |
| 6 | Slavery in Madagascar: Former Servitude and Current Aspects of Inequality | Lolona Razafindralambo |
| 7 | The Long-Term Jewish Diaspora of Africa: Between Historical Realities and Borrowing Processes | Idrissa Ba |
| 8 | Asian Diasporas in East Africa and the Islands (1st–15th Century) | Philippe Beaujard |
| 9 | Gujaratis of the Western Indian Ocean: Historical Challenges and Research Prospect | Ludovic Gandelot |
| 10 | Settlement and Identity Construction in West Africa: The Jula trading Diaspora | Chikouna Cissé |
| 11 | Zanzibar’s Commercial Empire | Jonathon Glassman |
| 12 | Culinary and Food Heritage | Luiz Felipe de Alencastro |

=== Volume 10: Africa and Its Diasporas (2025) ===
UNESDOC link

| Chapter No. | Chapter Title | Author |
|---|---|---|
Section I: Redefining Global Africanity and Blackness
| – | Introduction: The Epistemological Basis for Claiming Black Identities | Carole Boyce-Davis |
| 1 | Blackness Beyond the United States: Understanding New Diasporic Definitions | Michelle M. Wright |
| 2 | Conceptualising Colour Representation in Antiquity: From Kmt, The Greco-Roman World to The Middle Ages | Amon Saba Saakana |
| 3 | North Africa and the Origins of Epistemic Blackness | Jesse Benjamin |
| 4 | What's in a Name? Complications of Blackness and Afrodescendant Definitions in Latin America and the Spanish-speaking Caribbean | Augustín Laó-Montes |
| 5 | Becoming Black: Brazil's Long Search for Racial History | Elaine Rocha |
| 6 | The Indian Ocean as Diasporic Field | Françoise Verges |
| 7 | African Diaspora in South Asia: A Theoretical Perspective | Shihan de Silva Jayasuriya |
| 8 | Blacks/Africans in China: Historical Process and Diasporic Experience | Anshan Li |
| 9 | Being Black in Australia | Karina Smith, Christopher Sonn and Tracy Cooper |
| 10 | Transnationalism, Diasporas and the African Diaspora: Some Theoretical Considerations | Harry Goulbourne |
| 11 | Economics of the Translantic African Diaspora | Joseph E. Inikori |
| 12 | Reflections in Indigeneity and African Belonging in the Caribbean and the Americas | Shona N. Jackson |
| 13 | Black Studies Epistemologies in the United States of America | Charisse Burden-Stelly |
| 14 | Transnational Feminism for Global Africa | Amina Mama |
| 15 | Intellectual Genealogies of Black/Queer/Diaspora | Jafari S. Allen |
| 16 | Genealogy of a Discriminatory Rhetoric in the Classical Arab-Muslim World | Sarah Trabelsi |
Section II: Mapping the African Diasporas
| – | Introduction | Vanicléia Silva Santos (E) |
| 1 | Africans in Ancient China (900–1600 CE) | Don J. Wyatt |
| 2 | The Afro-Indian Diaspora and the Rise of European Influence (1500–1700) | Faaeza Jasdanwalla |
| 3 | Iranian People of African Descent: Local Boundary and National Unity | Behnaz Mirzai |
| 4 | The African Diaspora in Oceania (1700–1800) | Cassandra Pybus |
| 5 | The 'Masombika' or 'Makoa' in Madagascar | Klara Boyer-Rossol |
| 6 | Mauritius, between Community Compartmentalisation and Cultural Melting Pots | Catherine Servan-Schreiber |
| 7 | Africans in Portugal: Integration and Africanity (Fifteenth–Nineteenth Centuries) | Isabel Castro Henriques |
| 8 | Afro-Atlantic Communities in the Atlantic World | Roquinaldo Ferreira and Carlos de Silva Jr. |
| 9 | Creolization in Early Modern West Africa and African Diaspora: Lowcountry Creola' and the Making of Gullah Geeche ca. 1500–1860 | Edda L. Fields-Black |
| 10 | Communities of African Descent in Canada | Michele A. Johnson |
| 11 | African-Mexican Communities: Excluded from the Mexican Nation | Paulette A. Ramsay |
| 12 | African Communities in Costa Rica and Central America | Rina Caceres |
| 13 | Blackness Across Borders: Jamaican Diasporas and New Politics of Citizenship | Deborah A. Thomas |
| 14 | Resistance of Malagasy Slaves to Enslavement (in the Seventeenth and Eighteenth Centuries) | Rafael Thiébaut |
| 15 | Enslaved Revolt in Brazil | João José Reis |
| 16 | Enslaved Resistance in North America | Sylviane Diouf |
| 17 | The Participation of Berber, Nubian and Sudanese Soldiers in the Muslim Conquest of the Iberian Peninsula (Eighth-Twelfth centuries) | Sarah Trabelsi |
| 18 | Haiti and Global Africa | Matthew J. Smith |
| 19 | Maroonism and Resistance in the Afro-Columban Pacific | Rafael Antonio Díaz Díaz |
| 20 | African Brazil: Geographies, Cartographies and Invisibilities | Rafael Sanzio Araújo Dos Anjos |
| 21 | Comparative Perspectives of Abolition of Slavery in the Americas and Africa | Ana Lucia Araújo |
| 22 | Muslims' Resistance in the Americas | Sylviane Diouf |
| 23 | Lady of the Rosary, Mameto Kalunga: Black Brotherhoods and Devotions in the Luso-African Atlantic | Lucilene Reginaldo |
| 24 | African Nations in Afro-Brazilian Religions | Luis Nicolau Parés |
| 25 | The Invisible Linguistic Ties Between Africa and the Other Side | Alain Anselin |
| 26 | The Presence of African Languages in Latin America | Margarida Petter |
| 27 | African Oral Traditions in Brazil | Sônia Maria de Melo Queiróz |
| 28 | Slavery and Gender in the Americas and Africa | Mariana P. Candido |
| 29 | The Origins of African Foodways in the Americas | Judith A. Carney |
| 30 | Technologies, Inheritances and Redefinitions in the Experience of the African Diaspora: Ceramics, Metallurgy and Quilombos | Luís Cláudio Pereira Symanksi and Flávio dos Santo Gomes |
| 31 | Africans in the Diaspora and the Experience of Navigation | Jaime Rodrigues |
| 32 | Returnee Africans of the Indian Ocean: The Bombay Africans | Clifford Pereira |
| 33 | African Diaspora, Sierra Leone and Protestant Christianity, circa 1780–1860 | Suzanne Schwarz |
| 34 | The Krios People of Sierra Leone: A Rooted Errance (Seventeenth–Nineteenth Centuries) | Sylvie Kandé |
| 35 | Agudás – The 'Brazilians' of Benin | Milton Guran |
| 36 | Back to Africa: The Return of Slaves Freed in Brazil | Mônica Lima E Souza |
Section III: Life Stories and Freedom Narratives of Global Africa
| – | Introduction: Life Stories and Freedom Narratives of Global Africa | Paul E. Lovejoy |
| 1 | Children in the Indian Ocean | Edward A. Alpers |
| 2 | Juan Correa, a Baroque Painter of African Descent from New-Spanish Mexico | María Elisa Velásquez |
| 3 | Biographies of Africans in Diaspora: Individual Trajectories and Collective Identities | Nielson Rosa Bezerra |
| 4 | Joseph Bologne De Saint-Georges (1745–1799) | Margaret Crosby-Arnold |
| 5 | Notices for Fugitive Slaves in the Atlantic World: Life Stories and 'Little[s] Pace[s] of Narrative' | Jean-Pierre Le Glaunec |
| 6 | 'I am not a Slave': Liberated Africans and their Usage of the Judicial System in Nineteenth Century Rio de Janeiro | Daniela Carvalho Cavalheiro |
| 7 | Biography, History, and Diaspora: The Bight of Benin and Bahia | Kristin Mann and Lisa Earl Castillo |
| 8 | Dona Ana Joaquina dos Santos Silva: A Woman Merchant of Nineteenth Century Luanda | Vanessa S. Oliveira |
| 9 | Testimonies of Slavery & Freedom: The North American Slave Narrative | Mary Miall Mitchell |
| 10 | Osifekunde of Ijebu (Yorubaland) | Olatunji Ojo |
| 11 | Nadir Agha: The Life of a Black Eunuch, A Journey from Abyssinia to the Ottoman Palace (c. 1870 to 1957) | Özgül Özdemir |
| 12 | Nicholas Said of Borno: American Civil War Veteran | Mohammed Bashir Salau |
| 13 | From Slavery to Freedom: The Interesting Narrative of Gustavus Vassa, the African (aka Olaudah Equiano) | Chika Unigwe |
| 14 | Fragments of the Life History of Fuseng-Be: A Temne Woman Sold in Freetown, Sierra Leone in the Early Nineteenth Century | Susanne Schwarz |
| 15 | From Captives to Heroes: Liberated Africans in Calabar, 1850–1920 | David Lishilinimle Imbua |
| 16 | The Whitney Plantation (Habitation Haydel) of the German Coast of Louisiana (1750–1860) | Ibrahima Seck |
| 17 | Catherine Mulgrave-Zimmermann | Maureen Warner-Lewis |
| 18 | The Slavery and Freedom Narrative of Mahommah Gardo Baquaqua in the Nineteenth-Century Atlantic World | Bruno Rafael Véras |

=== Volume 11: Global Africa Today (2025) ===
UNESDOC link

Editor: Hilary Beckles

| Chapter No. | Chapter Title | Author |
|---|---|---|
Section I: Global Africa Today
| – | Introduction | Catherine Coquery-Vidrovitch |
| 1 | The Cultural Foundations of Global Africa | Souleymane Bachir Diagne |
| 2 | African History and Memory | Bogumil Jewsiewicki Koss |
| 3 | The Creative Centres of African Thought | Pierre Kipré |
| 4 | African Cultures Under the Ordeal of the Atlantic Slave Trade | Ibrahima Thioub |
| 5 | A Global Africa as Seen Through the Prism of the Memory of Slavery | Myriam Cottas |
| 6 | Colonialism | Frederick Cooper |
| 7 | Rethinking the History of Poverty in Africa: Three Epistemological Approaches | Vincent Bonnecase |
| 8 | Food Insecurity in the Sahel: The Limits of Food Crisis Prevention and Management Mechanisms, the Case of Niger | Boureima Alpha Gado |
| 9 | Feminism in Africa | Fatou Sow |
| 10 | The Woman's Africa in Her Own Words | Esi Sutherland-Addy |
| 11 | Christianity and Black Churches: Obstacles and Challenges | Wyatt MacGaffey |
| 12 | New Religions, New Diasporas | Olusegun Morakinyo |
| 13 | Black Imperialism: A Magic Conception of Social and Political Facts in Contemporary Societies | Joseph Tonda |
| 14 | From Terroir and Ethnicity to the Idea of Territorial State | Mamadou Fall |
| 15 | Nationalism/Nationalities | Pierre Kipré |
| 16 | Traditional Institutions and the Birth of the State in Nigeria (Twentieth Century) | Jean-Luc Martineau |
| 17 | The Formation of the State and the Conflicting Genesis of a Nation: the Example of Kenya | Hélène Charton |
| 18 | Space, Insularity and Borders: The Case of Madagascar | Tovonirina Daniela Rakotondrabe |
| 19 | The Concepts of Creolization/Hybridation/Métissage | Dominic Richard David Thomas |
| 20 | Afro-Caribbean Seamen in the Black Atlantic World 1880–1950 | Alan Cobley |
| 21 | Walter Rodney, Sylvia Wynter, and the Development of Africana Studies in the Post-Independence Anglophone Caribbean | Aaron Kamugisha |
| 22 | Identity and 'Indigenous Knowledge' in the Sixth Region of Africa | Alan Cobley |
| 23 | Changing Consciousness of Africa in Caribbean Pan-Africanism | Waibinte E. Wariboko |
| 24 | New Economic Indicators: Globalization in African Words | Samir Amin |
| 25 | Global African Modernisms | Heather D. Russell |
| 26 | Identity: Developing One’s Own Image and Naming Oneself | Helen Lauer |
Section II: Africa in the Contemporary World
| – | Introduction | Tayeb Chenntouf |
| 1 | Changes and Continuity of Pan-Africanism | Amzat Boukari-Yabara |
| 2 | The Pan-African Movement for Transnational Liberation and Human Rights | Tukufu Zuberi |
| 3 | Social Movements Claiming an African Identity | Valter Roberto Silvério |
| 4 | Contemporary Views of Africanness | Amzat Boukari-Yabara |
| 5 | Relationships between Africa and the Diasporas | Giulia Bonacci |
| 6 | Entering into History | Tayeb Chenntouf |
| 7 | Africa in the Media | Willy Jackson and Issiaka Mandé |
| 8 | North Africa: from Classical Orientalism to Neo-Orientalism | Bahija Chadili |
| 9 | Africanism | Gosnell L. Yorke |
| 10 | Why Research on the Global Black Middle Class is Essential | Kris Marsh |
| 11 | Islam in Africa | Souleymane Bachir Diagne |
| 12 | Europe in Algerian History Textbooks | Tayeb Chenntouf |
| 13 | Africa's Place in School Curricula in Brazil | Valter Roberto Silvério and Nilma Lino Gomes |
| 14 | Global Africanity and Education | Yamina Bentabet |
| 15 | 'Marxist-Leninist' States in Tropical Africa in the Late Twentieth Century | Alexander Balezin |
| 16 | The Marxist Experience: The Case of the Congo and Angola | Jean-Michel Mabeko-Tali |
| 17 | Political Coups and One-Party Regimes | Willy Jackson and Issiaka Mandé |
| 18 | External Factors: The Role of Moscow and its Allies in the Decolonization of Namibia and the End of Apartheid in South Africa | Vladimir Shubin |
| 19 | Globalization | Moussa Willy Bantenga |
| 20 | New World Geopolitics | Willy Jackson |
| 21 | Towards a Multipolar World | Willy Jackson |
| 22 | Africa’s Relations With Emerging Countries: China | Anshan Li |
| 23 | African Immigrants and Citizens in the United States of America | Fumilayo E. Showers |
| 24 | Africa’s Relations With Europe | Joseph Gahama |
| 25 | Legacy of Apartheid | Patrick Harries |
| 26 | Africanity and Globalization | Jean-Pierre Dozon |
| 27 | What Africa Can Contribute to the World | Thaddeus Metz |
| 28 | The Role of African Intellectuals and Artists | Luís Kandjimbo |
| 29 | Issues Associated With the Dissemination of African Thought | Pierre Kipré |
Section III: Africa at the Turn of the Third Millennium: Challenges and Dynamics
| – | Introduction | Faranirina V. Rajaonah |
| 1 | Population Growth in Africa, The Impact of Numbers: Issues and Challenges | Cécile Marie Zoungrana and Pierre Klissou |
| 2 | Epidemics in Africa at the Turn of the Twenty-First Century: A Continuous Threat and a Major Challenge for Health Systems | Marie-Roseline Darnycka Bélizaire and Sosthène Zombre |
| 3 | Kinshasa: An African Metropolis and a Singular City | Charles Tshimanga |
| 4 | Mid-Sized Cities in the Maghreb: An Expression of Internal Logic? | Madani Safar Zitoun |
| 5 | Age and Generation in the Comoros: Initiation, Solidarity and Change | Sophie Blanchy |
| 6 | Between Generation and Nation: Cultures and the Youth in Mozambique | Didier Nativel |
| 7 | Trajectories of African Graduates in Post-Soviet Russia | Tatiana Smirnova |
| 8 | The Social Rise and Power of Generations of Military Elites in Madagascar | Tovonirina Daniela Rakotondrabe |
| 9 | Women’s Education in West Africa Since 1990 | Olufunke Adeboye |
| 10 | Towards Visibility and Equal Opportunities for Women | Catherine Coquery-Vidrovitch |
| 11 | The Dynamics of Senegalese Female Migrations | Rokhaya Cissé |
| 12 | African Regional Integration, Globalization, and Dependency | Willy Jackson |
| 13 | Africa-BRICS: An Alternative Cooperation Model | Evgeni Korendyasov |
| 14 | Africa in the Face of Land Rush Challenges | Demba Moussa Dembélé |
| 15 | Migration and Development: African Perspectives | Issiaka Mandé |
| 16 | Africa as the New Financial Hub | Vusi Gumede |
| 17 | The Age of Salafism: Rupture and Restructuring in West African Societies | Abdoulaye Sounaye |
| 18 | New Christianities in sub-Saharan Africa | Wyatt MacGaffey |
| 19 | Rap and Hip Hop: Youth Movement and Black Cosmopolitan Aesthetics in African Popular Music | Olabode Omojola |
| 20 | Imaging/Imaginings/Imaginaries: Historicizing Contemporary African Cinema at the Turn of the Third Millennium | Aboubakar Sanogo |
| 21 | Reading Leso: African Fabric as a Gateway to the World | Mshaï Mwangola |
| 2 | Contemporary Circulation of African Art in Cuba and Haiti: Biennials, Exhibitions, and Artists' Travels | Yolanda Wood |

== History ==
"My own background, the experience I gained as a teacher and as chairman... taught me how necessary it was for the education of young people and for the information of the public at large to have a history book produced by scholars with inside knowledge of the problems and hopes of Africa and with the ability to apprehend the Continent in its entirety."

– Amadou Mahtar M'Bow, former Director General of UNESCO (1974–1987)

The project encompasses two of UNESCO's key priorities – Africa and Education. Africa, in terms of a response to urgent development needs at the national level and to accompany the regional integration process; and education because this issue is a fundamental human right and the very basis of development and responsible citizenry. African peoples expressed their desire to "decolonize" the history of their Continent to deconstruct the traditional prejudices and clarify the truth of the African past. The project also takes into consideration modern teaching tools, such as internet resources and multimedia platforms, to ensure that learning is an interactive discovery process. Africa was never cut off from the rest of the world, and benefitted from mutual exchange and influences with Asia, the Middle East, Europe, and the Americas. The slave trade, slavery, and colonization had a considerable impact on the fragmentation of the Continent. The African Diaspora that resulted contributed in a significant manner to the creation of new cultures and societies. The Pedagogical Use of the General History of Africa aims to develop curriculum that highlights the African contribution to the progress of Humanity, African shared values, interaction with the rest of the world.

In this perspective, the creation of the African Union (AU) and the implementation of the NEPAD philosophy of developing Africa-led solutions to African challenges offered a new and favorable context for a political leadership committed to African regional integration and provided a mechanism for addressing history teaching within the continent as a whole. Furthermore, the Action Plan of the Second Decade for Education in Africa (2006 to 2015), which emphasizes the strengthening of the links between education and culture and improving the quality of pedagogical content, constitutes an ideal framework for the implementation of the project.

Article 7 of the Charter of African Cultural Renaissance adopted in 2006 in Khartoum at the Heads of State Summit stipulates that

“African States commit themselves to work for African Renaissance. They agree on the need for reconstruction of the historical memory and conscience of Africa and the African Diaspora. They consider that the general History published by UNESCO constitutes a valid base for teaching the History of Africa and recommend its dissemination, including in African languages, as well as the publication of its abridged and simplified versions for wider audiences.”

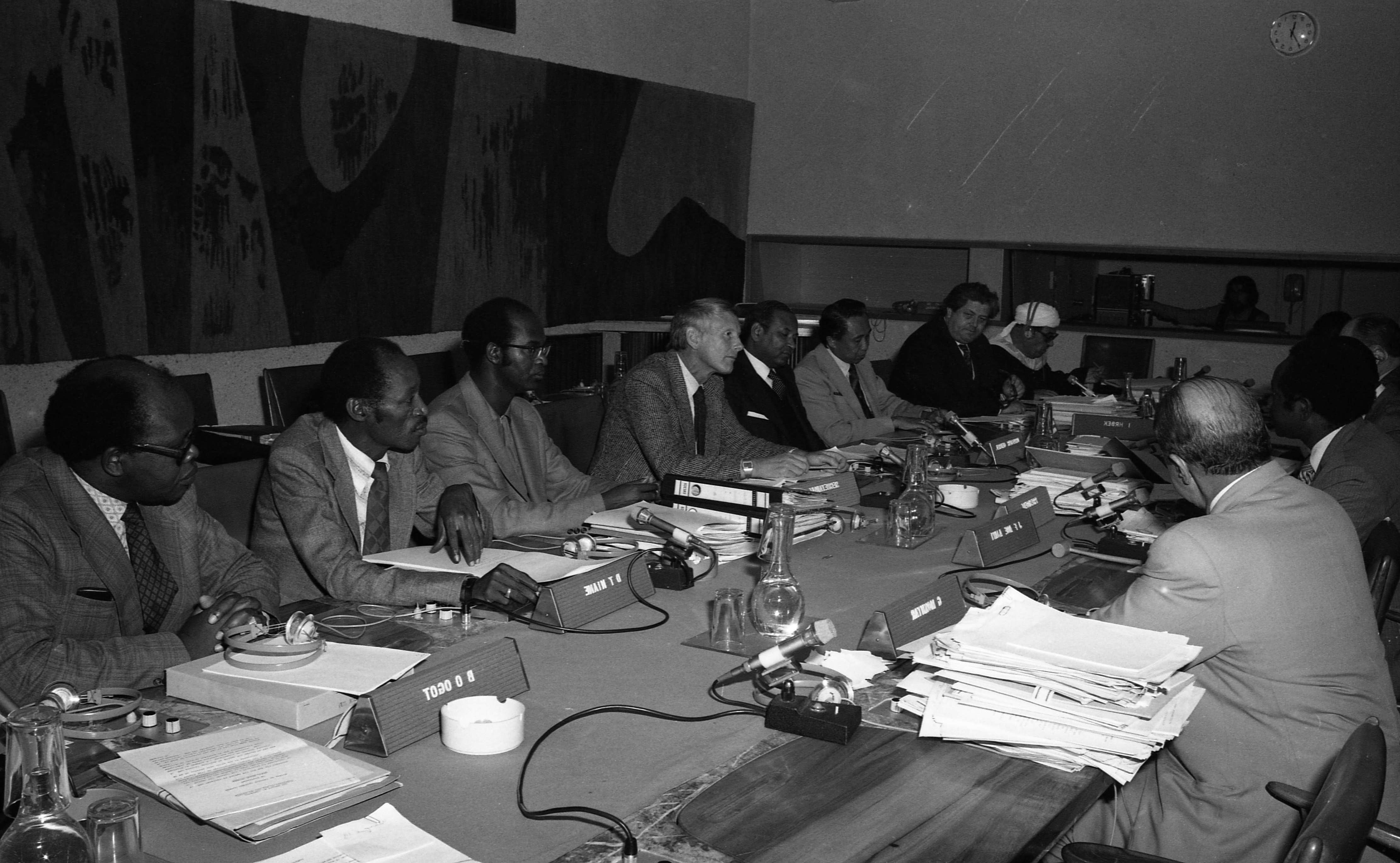
1977 Meeting for the General History of Africa

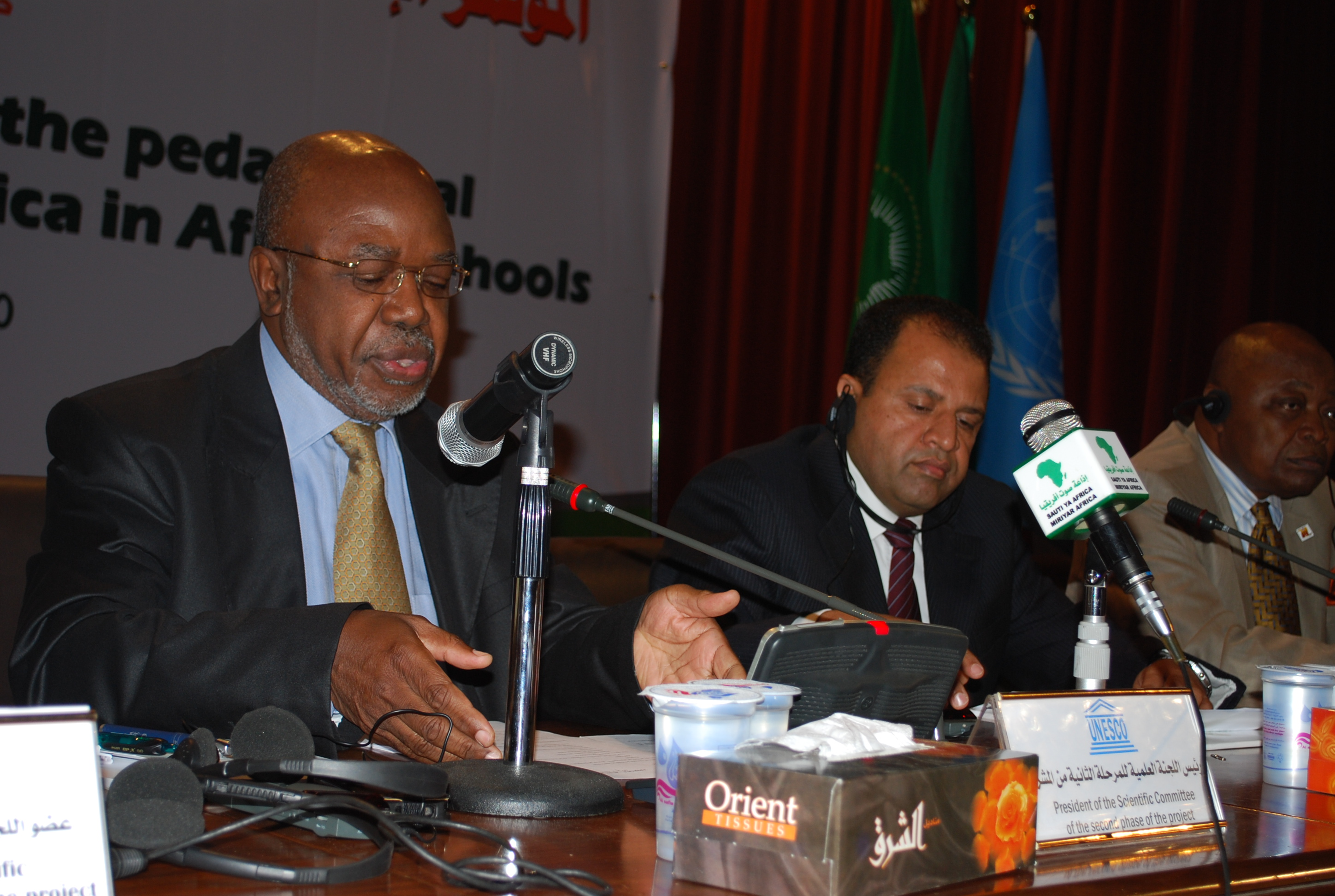
2010 Scientific Committee Meeting for the General History of Africa

== Phase One ==
Phase One was from 1964 to 1999.

Following their decolonization in the early 1960s, African countries expressed a strong desire to recover their ownership of their past and the production of knowledge regarding their heritage. The African member states of UNESCO were then called upon to re-affirm their cultural identities and reinforce the common aspiration to achieve African unity. Part of these efforts included combating certain preconceptions including the assumption that the lack of written sources made it difficult to engage in serious study or production of African history. The conventional reading of history also needed to be challenged to depict a more accurate picture of the African continent, of its cultural diversity, and its contribution to the general progress of humankind. Thus, at its 16th Session (1964), the General Conference of UNESCO invited the Director-General to undertake the elaboration of a General History of Africa. In this framework, the General History of Africa was written and published in eight volumes, with a main edition in English, French and Arabic. Additional publications have been produced in Chinese, Portuguese, Russian, German, Italian, Spanish, and Japanese. Furthermore, twelve studies and documents on related themes as well as an abridged version of the main edition in English, French, Kiswahili, Hausa and Fulfulde were published. This tremendous undertaking represented thirty five years of cooperation between three hundred and fifty experts from Africa and from the rest of the world. This work involved some of the most eminent African scholars such as Cheikh Anta Diop, Joseph Ki-Zerbo, Theophile Obenga, Ali Mazrui, Gamal Mokhtar, Bethwell A. Ogot, etc. It also included non-African experts, such as Jan Vansina, Jean Devisse and Philip Curtin.

The main preoccupation of Phase 1 was to provide a culturally relevant perspective based on an interdisciplinary approach with a focus on the history of ideas and civilizations, societies and institutions. To that end, it was envisaged to develop an African centered point of view using African sources, such as oral traditions, art forms and linguistics. It was decided as well to adopt a continental perspective of Africa as a whole avoiding the usual dichotomy between North Africa and Sub-Saharan Africa. This shift in perspective is reflected by the significant number of renowned African scholars who contributed to this project as members of the International Scientific Committee, editors and authors.

To tackle this task, made all the more complex and difficult by the vast range of sources and the fact that documents were widely scattered, UNESCO had to proceed in stages. The first stages (1965–1969) consisted of gathering documentation and planning the work. Several meetings were held and campaigns were conducted in the field to collect oral traditions and establish regional documentation centers. In addition, several activities were undertaken: including the collection of unpublished manuscripts in Arabic and Ajami (manuscripts in African languages written with Arabic alphabet), the compilation of archival inventories and the preparation of a Guide to the Sources of the History of Africa, culled from the archives and libraries of a number of European and Asian countries and later published in nine volumes.

The second stage (1969 to 1971) was devoted to the deliberation of complex substantial and methodological questions raised by the compilation of the GHA. It was decided that the GHA should cover three million years of African history, in eight volumes, published in English, Arabic, French, and in African languages such as Kiswahili, Hausa, and Fulfulde.

The next stage (1971 to 1999) consisted of the drafting and publication. This began with the establishment of the International Scientific Committee to ensure the intellectual and scientific responsibility of the work and oversee the drafting and publication of the volumes. During this period, UNESCO organized scientific colloquia and symposia on topics related to the history of Africa most of which were overlooked by researchers. The results of these meetings were published in a series of books entitled "UNESCO Studies and Documents -The General History of Africa". Twelve studies were published covering a wide range of subjects including: the Slave trade, relations between Africa and the Arab world, relations between Africa and the Indian Ocean, and the role of youth and women.

Bearing in mind that history teaching is instrumental in shaping peoples’ identities and in understanding the common ties underlying the cultural diversity in any region, and in order to implement one of the goals initially set for the General History of Africa by its initiators, UNESCO, in collaboration with the African Union Commission, launched in March 2009, Phase II of GHA entitled the "Pedagogical Use of the General History of Africa" project.

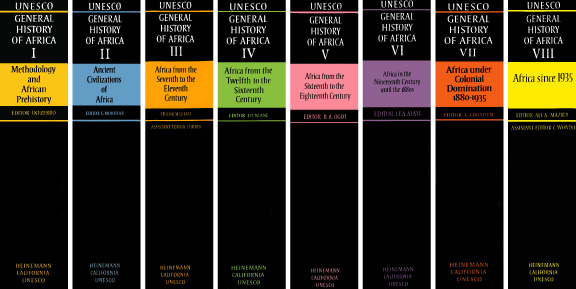
Eight volumes of the General History of Africa

== Phase Two ==
In 2009 UNESCO launched the second phase of the project focusing on the implementation of the GHA entitled, the "Pedagogical Use of the General History of Africa." This phase, which constitutes a priority in the cooperation between UNESCO and the African Union, falls within the framework of the Action Plan of the Second Decade for Education in Africa (2006–2015). The Action Plan emphasizes the strengthening of the links between education and culture and improving the quality of pedagogical contents such as internet resources and audiovisual materials. It further corresponds to recommendations made following several meetings organized by UNESCO before and after the completion of the first phase of the GHA.

To successfully implement the second phase of the project, UNESCO has had to have the project validated by different African institutional and academic stakeholders including the Ministers of Education and various professional associations including historians, history teachers, pedagogues, et al. At the Ministers of Education of the COMEDAF meeting in November 2009, the African Ministers reaffirmed their support for the project and recalled the political leadership of the African Union on the Project. This continued cooperation between the Commission of the African Union and UNESCO has been necessary to facilitate the appropriation of the project.

=== Objectives ===
“This project gives us a formidable opportunity to develop a pan-African vision that also highlights the contribution of African cultures and civilizations to humankind.”

– Irina Bokova, Director General of UNESCO 16 June 2010

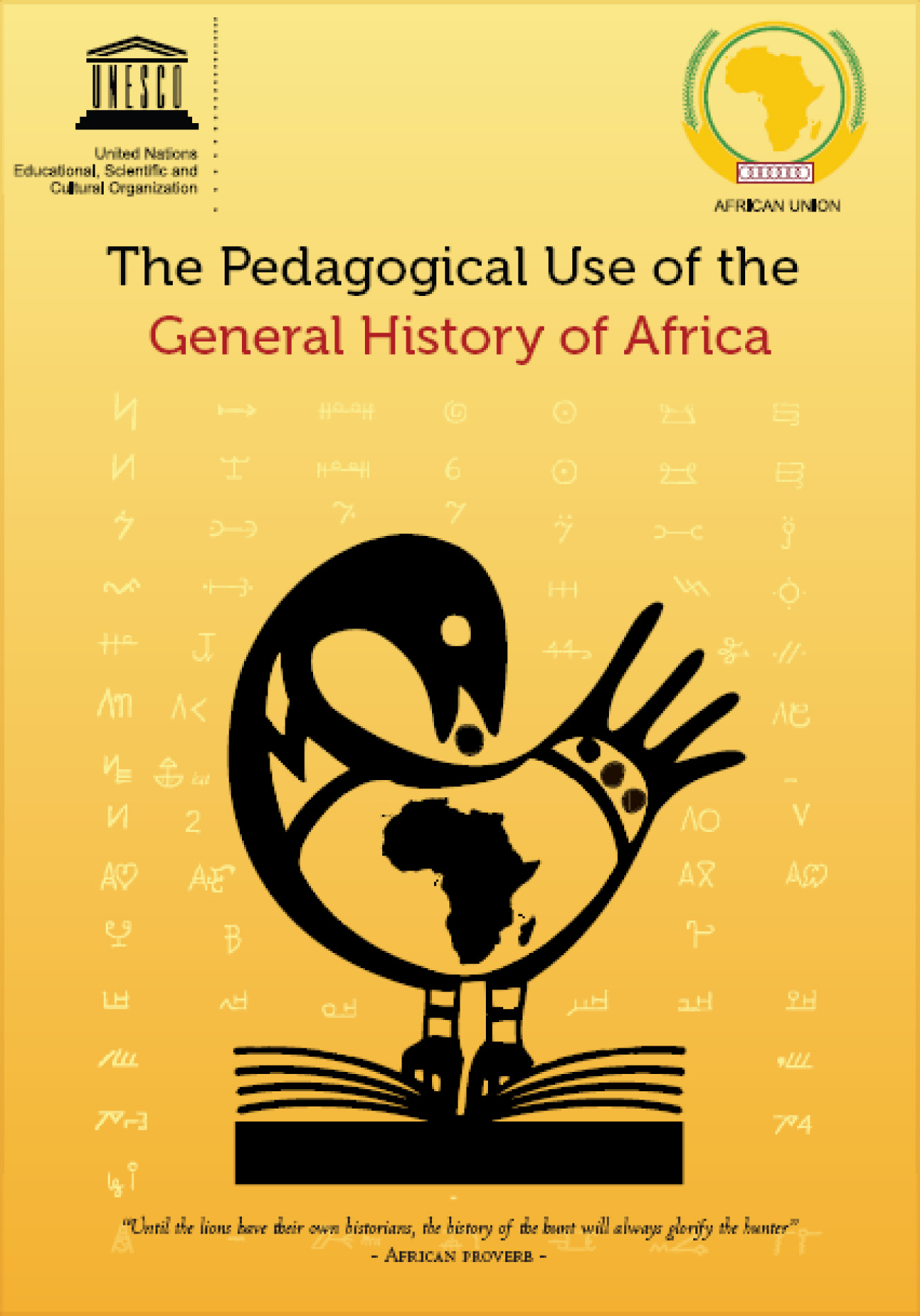
The Pedagogical Use of the General History of Africa Brochure

The main objective of Phase Two, entitled "The Pedagogical Use of the General History of Africa" is to contribute to the regenerating of the teaching of African history on the basis of the General History of Africa in African Union member States with the view to promote the African regional integration process. In particular, the project aims to:

- develop common content for use in African primary and secondary schools, for three different age groups (under 12, 13–16 and 17–19) as well as an historical atlas and an educational CD-Rom. The content could, if necessary, be adapted to local circumstances without changing the regional scope;
- improve teacher training in light of the latest findings in historical research and advances made in the methodology and methods of history teaching. A teachers’ guide will be elaborated and guidelines to reinforce initial and in-service training of primary and secondary school teachers will be defined.
- promote the teaching of and harmonize the use of the GHA in higher education institutions across the continent.

=== Implementation ===
To implement the project, UNESCO established a ten-member Scientific Committee (SC) representing the five sub regions of the Continent, entrusted with the intellectual and scientific responsibility of the project. The committee members were designated by the Director General of UNESCO in February 2009 after a series of consultations held with different partners and stakeholders including: the African Union, the Africa Group of UNESCO, the donor country, the African Historian Association, the International Association of Historians, and members of the former International Scientific Committee established for the first phase of the Project. These members are Professor Alaa El-din Shaheen (Egypt), Professor Taieb El Bahloul (Libyan Arab Jamahiriya), Professor Sifiso Ndlovu (South Africa), Professor Amakobe Florida Karani (Kenya), Professor Adame Ba Konaré (Mali), Professor Jean Michel Mabeko-Tali (Congo), Professor Lily Mafela (Botswana), Professor Elikia M’bokolo (D.R. Congo), Professor Mamadou N’doye (Senegal), Professor Bahru Zewde (Ethiopia).

The aforementioned members were installed on 24 February 2009, in the framework of the Forum for African Regional and Sub-Regional Organizations to Support Cooperation between UNESCO and NEPAD (FORASUN) that took place in Tripoli (Libya) from 20–24 February 2009, UNESCO organized an Expert Meeting on 16–17 March 2009 to discuss the proposed methodology for the implementation of the project. This meeting was immediately followed by the first meeting of the Scientific Committee (SC), which took place from 18–20 March 2009.

=== Major developments since the launch of Phase Two ===
- Organization of an expert meeting: UNESCO organized on 16–17 March 2009 an Expert Meeting which gathered 35 experts from the different African sub regions, including members of the former International Scientific Committee for the first Phase of the GHA, editors and authors of the GHA volumes, representatives of African sub regional organizations et al. During the meeting, the experts discussed the proposed methodology for the implementation of the project and made concrete recommendations to the SC.
- Organization of the 1st meeting of the SC:

The SC for the Pedagogical Use of the General History of Africa held its First Meeting from 18–20 March 2009 at UNESCO HQ.[7] The Committee:

- Elected its Bureau (Prof. Mbokolo, Chairman; Prof. N’doye, 1st vice-chairman; Prof. El Bahloul, 2nd vice-chairman; Prof. Mafela, Rapporteur)
- Determined the functioning of the Committee
- Discussed the methodology and activities proposed for the implementation of the project
- Examined the recommendations formulated to that end by the Experts Meeting
- Stressed the need to make the most of any relevant political and cultural events to present the Project and to advocate for it

3. Endorsement by the Executive Council of the African Union (AU)

- During its Sixth Ordinary Session held in Khartoum, on 24–25 January 2006, the African Union Heads of States took a decision regarding the strengthening of the links between education and culture (Assembly/AU/dec.96 (VI)), as one of the main focus areas of the Plan of Action for the Second Decade of Education for Africa (2006–2015)

- During its Fifteenth Ordinary Session held in Syrte (Libya) from 24 to 30 June 2009, the Council adopted a decision in which it expressed its support for the project and urged the African Union Member States to contribute to its implementation (Decision EX.CL/Dec. 492 (XV) Rev.1).

- Endorsement by the Conference of Ministers of Education of the African Union (COMEDAF):

- During their Second Extraordinary Session (COMEDAF II+), which took place from 4 to 8 September 2006 in Maputo (Mozambique), the African Ministers of Education pointed out in their Declaration the teaching of African history as one of the issues critical to successfully eradicate deficiencies in Africa's Education systems and to ensure that education plays its role in the vision of the African Union and this, within the Second Decade of Education for Africa.
- During their Fourth Ordinary Session (COMEDAF IV) held in Mombasa (Kenya), 23–26 November 2009, the African Ministers, in their communiqué, reaffirmed their support for the project and recalled the political leadership of the African Union on the project.

- Designation of focal points within the African Ministers of Education (MoE):

46 African Ministers of Education out of 51 have designated focal points within their ministries to participate in and follow up the implementation of the project.

- Designation of the drafting committees for the elaboration of pedagogical tools on the basis of the GHA:

The SC for the project met from 24 to 28 October 2010 to designate members of the drafting committees for the common pedagogical content and teachers guides. The Committee selected 30 experts who will compose the above-mentioned committees taking into account competency, gender, and geographical balance.

== Conflicting views between historians ==
Because of the nature of the series, different historians had contrasting and conflicting views on certain subject matters.

=== Cheikh Anta Diop's "Origin of the ancient Egyptians" chapter ===
Cheikh Anta Diop's contribution to the second volume focused on the Ancient egyptian race controversy and his argument that "the whole of the [ancient] Egyptian population [...] was negro, barring an infiltration of white nomads in the proto-dynastic epoch", and that "the black population of Upper Egypt began to retreat only at the time of the Persian occupation". This argument was not universally accepted by the other contributors to the UNESCO series. Diop's chapter had a note from editor Gamal Mokhtar warning the reader that "The opinions expressed by Professor Cheikh Anta Diop in this chapter are those which he presented and developed at the Unesco symposium on 'The peopling of ancient Egypt' [...] The arguments put forward in this chapter have not been accepted by all the experts interested in the problem." In the introduction to the volume, Mokhtar himself argued that "it is highly doubtful whether the inhabitants that introduced civilization into the Nile valley ever belonged to one single, pure race". Mokhtar later added in the introduction that “It is more than probable that the African strain, black or light, is preponderant in the Ancient Egyptian, but in the present state of our knowledge it is impossible to say more”. In the 1981 edition, Mokhtar maintained that Upper Egypt and Nubia held "similar ethnic composition" with comparable material culture. Diop's chapter was followed by a summary of the 1974 Cairo symposium where Diop presented his ideas to 19 other historians.

The reactions to Diop's arguments at the symposion were wide-ranging. French professor Jean Leclant stressed the "African character of Egyptian civilization" but felt it was important to differentiate between 'race' and 'culture' and that there was no reason to rely on "outmoded studies" from Ernest Chantre, Grafton Elliot Smith, Giuseppe Sergi and Douglas Erith Derry as Diop had done. Sudanese professor Abdelgadir M. Abdalla noted that iconographic evidence showed that the "creators of the Napata culture had nothing in common with the Egyptians" and had "completely different" anatomical characteristics. He further argued that Diop's linguistic comparisons between Egyptian and Wolof were "neither convincing nor conclusive" and "it was hazardous to make too uncompromising a correlation between a language and an ethnic structure ". Abdalla's criticism of Diop's arguments lead to a "lively exchange of views on linguistic matters between Professors Abdalla and Diop". Egyptian professor Abu Bakr argued that "Egyptians had never been isolated from other peoples" and "never constituted a pure race". Congolese professor Theophile Obenga was however more supportive of Diop's views. He argued that "morphological, lexicological and syntactic similarities" provided "convincing proof of the close relationship between ancient Egyptian and negro-African languages of today" and that this was not the case "between Semitic, Berber and Egyptian". French professor Jean Vercoutter agreed with Diop that "the populations of the Egyptian reaches of the Nile Valley was homogenous as far as the southern extremity of the Delta" during the proto-dynastic and pre-dynastic periods. Overall, Diop's chapter was credited in the general conclusion of the 1974 symposium report by the International Scientific Committee's Rapporteur, Professor Jean Devisse, as a "painstakingly researched contribution" which nevertheless led to a "real lack of balance" in the discussion among participants.

Jan Vansina, who contributed chapters to volumes 1, 3–5, 7 and 8, noted that there had previously been a "clash" between Cheikh Anta Diop and Gamal Mokhtar on the matter of topics that would be included in the second volume. The committee then decided on the "principle of heterogeneity" and that uniformity on the interpretation of historical evidence would not be imposed on any historian writing for the UNESCO General History of Africa.

Larissa Nordholt argued that Diop's chapter was politically motivated, having been published only due to being in line with UNESCO's political imperatives, despite clashing with accepted historical methods and standards of academic rigor. Nordholdt argued that Diop's views aligned with the decolonisation efforts of the General History of Africa but he premised his arguments on outdated, racialism which classified humanity into distinct groups with a biological essence. Nordholdt specified the point of contention between Diop and other historians such as the basis of methodology and his reliance on outdated, eighteenth century and nineteenth century European sources. However, she did state that the contributors did "come to a general consensus that the Egyptians could not not have been “white" in the same way that Europeans were" and the dissemination of Diop's ideas contributed to a wider recognition that the Ancient Egypt was an African civilisation although his methods were "not considered entirely permissible by most of the other GHA historians".

Bethwell Allan Ogot, a Kenyan historian and editor of UNESCO General History of Africa Volume 5, stated that "Cheikh Anta Diop wrested Egyptian civilization from the Egyptologists and restored it to the mainstream of African history".

According to a 2017 BBC nine-part series based on the General History of Africa book collection, UNESCO scholars are cited as having now reached the view that the matter is settled and “that the Pharaohs and their people must be placed firmly within the Black African context”.

=== 2025 UNESCO multidisciplinary review of the 1974 symposium ===
In 2025, the UNESCO International Scientific Committee members for drafting the General History of Africa Volumes IX-XI reached the view that Egypt had African and Eurasian populations, with Upper Egypt now repositioned as the origin of pharaonic unification, with close genetic, linguistic, archaeological and anthropological affinities identified between the Upper Egyptian populations and Sub-Saharan groups. Anthropologist and Egyptologist, Alain Anselin, reviewed the Volume II edition and conclusions of the 1974 symposium, stating that the accumulated data had aligned with Diop's views. Specifically, this related to recent research "over the last thirty years" confirming the early migration of Saharan and Southernly African populations to the Nile Valley. According to Anselin, the traditional view of a north to south orientation had been displaced by the weight of evidence which favoured the preponderance of Upper Egypt. In his review section, Anselin referenced a number of anthropological, linguistic, archaeological and climatological data which had established close links between Upper Egyptian populations and groups across Sub-Saharan Africa. Other African scholars in the recent volume including Augustin Holl, Olabiyi B.J. Yai, Yoporeka Somet, Martial Ze Belinga and Hamady Bocoum made favourable references to the intellectual influence of Cheikh Anta Diop in explicating bias in Western scholarship and serving as an early figure in constructing a multidisciplinary approach, with a particular emphasis on a scientific methodology, towards African history. Somet also observed the prescient value of Diop's works in recognizing the African origin of humanity and early Egyptian civilization by "the middle of the century".

=== John Parkington's "Southern Africa" chapter ===
John Parkington contributed a chapter on hunters and food-gatherers in Southern Africa for the second volume of the UNESCO series. The committee behind the UNESCO series however expressed "serious reservations" on the methods used in the chapter by the author, as these would cause confusion for the reader by presenting them with information on both the Palaeolithic era and contemporary southern Africa at the same time. Parkington was asked to partially alter his text but did not consider it possible. An agreement was therefore reached that the chapter be published in this form but with a note warning the reader of reservations expressed by the committee.

=== Chapter on the Bantu Expansion ===
Volume 3 included a chapter on the Bantu expansion written by Samwiri Lwanga-Lunyiigo and Jan Vansina. The editor's note on this chapter explained that the two authors had "different scientific training and divergent opinions", though could agree on "the most important questions". There was however one remaining "serious disagreement" on a theory presented by Samwiri Lwanga-Lunyiigo that differs from the opinion of most specialists on the field of the Bantu expansion but this had been retained for inclusion in the volume.

=== Withdrawn chapter from Volume 3 ===
An unnamed author was asked to write a chapter on the east African coast and supported Neville Chittick's belief that cities on the east African coast were "basically Asian". All but two of the committee members disagreed with this argument and the committee as a whole agreed that Chittick's position did not account for all known archaeological evidence. This chapter was replaced by another written by Fidelis T. Masao and Henry W. Mutoro.

=== Map in Volume 5 ===
A debate arose over the correct terminology to use for a map to accompany the chapter "The African diaspora in the old and new worlds". Delegates from different countries were sent to UNESCO to argue either for the use of the term "Persian Gulf" or "Arabian Gulf". The debate over this minor point would block the publication of the fifth volume until 1992.

== Reception ==
=== Volumes 1 and 2 ===
Christopher Ehret reviewed volume 1 for the African Studies Review and described it as an "essential reference book", referring to the first seven chapters as "useful summaries" for non-specialists. Ehret commended the selection of "most contributors in most volumes were scholastically apt choices" across the eight-volume series. However, he noted a number of limitations with the first volume such as the broad focus on historical geography and non-written sources across several chapters. Also, he criticised the over-representation of older, non-African scholars as contributors with some scholars "thwarting Ki-Zerbo's aspirations 'to bring the picture up to date',[having] no more to tell us than in the 1950s". Similarly, he criticised the inclusion of speculative, theories of David Dalby into chapters which examine African linguistic classification and the lack of focus on the current developments in the linguistic field.

In his review of the first two volumes for The International Journal of African Historical Studies, Ivor Wilks described the volumes as "handsome" and available at "so modest a price" compared to most other works on similar topics released by major commercial publishers. Wilks further described the series as "a useful monument to the state of African historiography in the 1970s and 1980s", though also noted that it would have to go through a "continuous process of revision" to "retain its value as a reliable work of reference". He also stated that the quality of individual chapters "vary considerably", with some chapters showing "an original contribution to the field" while others "make no pretense to be more than surveys". Wilks noted that "probably few of [the chapters] would otherwise have seen the light of day in the regular learned journals". Wilks described Volume 2 as having "less thematic unity" than the first volume, singling out Cheikh Anta Diop's "shrill" chapter on his "idiosyncratic" views of Ancient Egypt and the unusual step of the editor providing a warning to the reader on this particular chapter.

Michael Brett reviewed volume 2 for The Journal of African History, noting that while it would become "a necessary part of the library of anyone interested in the history of Africa as a whole", it would nonetheless "daunt the uninitiated" and "disappoint the specialist". He observed that despite the length of the book there was a problem with "compression" of information, with most chapters being "too short to allow the subject the exposition it deserves". In discussing the chapters on Egypt, which made up a third of the volume, Brett felt that space had been "simply wasted" with some chapters repeating information mentioned earlier in the volume. He also felt that much of the historical context of Ancient Egypt had been "squeezed almost out of existence", partly due to Cheikh Anta Diop's chapter on the 'Origins of the Ancient Egyptians' which was simply a "restatement" of this author's views and the "long résumé of [the 1974 Cairo Symphosium] on the subject" inserted afterwards seemingly as a "corrective to [Diop]'s idosyncratic view". As a result of space being taken up by this debate, the volume lacked any "discussion [...] of pre-dynastic Egypt and the settlement of the Nile valley which made possible the subsequent civilization". Brett further criticized the later chapters on Egypt, such as the one on Hellenistic Egypt which had "virtually no dates" or profile given for the rulers of the Ptolemaic dynasty. Brett did however praise the chapters on Nubia as providing a "satisfying account" of the Egyptian Empire south of Aswan, as well as the kingdoms based at Napata and Meroe.

Brett found fault with the chapters dealing with Aksum, which had a focus that was "resolutely South Arabian Semitic" with "extremely scant attention paid to the Abyssinian region as a whole". He singled out the chapter on the hunters and food-gatherers of Southern Africa, which included a note by the committee stating that they were unhappy with the author relying on recent ethnographic material, far beyond the chronological limits of this volume, to give an idea of what life was like for these people in ancient times. Brett however felt this chapter was a "most readable account" compared to the "rigidly archeological approach" used by other chapters on sub-Saharan Africa.

Adeline Apena reviewed the second volume for the Comparative Civilizations Review as a "major document in African history" and "dismisses the general sense of invalidity that surrounds use of African oral traditions as historical source material for African history". Apena noted the second volume has an emphasis on the relationship between environment, local resources and the growth of civilisations. However, she remained critical of "the Egyptian scholars in this debate who do not seem to accept that the ancient Egyptians were the same as the dark-skinned Sub-Saharans, in spite of the cultural similarities". Apena concluded that "the lower Nile and its Delta are likely to have blended the stocks of peoples that inhabited the region from Libya to Near East and southwards towards Nubia" but scholarly judgements in the second volume were inconclusive due to the obscurity of the period, scarcity of sources and dated sources.

=== Volume 3 ===
J. E. G. Sutton reviewed Volume 3 for The Journal of African Study, noting that the chapters were of "varying quality and lucidity" but could be used for scholarly reference or education provided that the reader is "patient enough to sift and select" from among the chapters. He further noted that not all authors in the volume had the "breadth of vision and experience" needed for this kind of book, with some possibly receiving "insufficient editorial guidance" or conversely having "suffered excessive interference". Sutton also felt that the dating system used in the series (which avoids the B.C./A.D. system to be culturally neutral) would be confusing to most readers and that the overall presentation of the volume was not "sufficiently inviting". Sutton additionally noted that, like Volume 2, this volume was more heavily focused on Northern Africa than Africa further to the South, though there was a "valiant" attempt to draw together information on the continent as a whole in the final chapter and he commended the "obvious and strenuous effort" to include every region of Africa in the discussion.

=== Volume 6 ===
In a review for The Journal of African Study, E. Ann McDougell stated that this volume fared well in regards to quality but felt dated and could be considered "state of the art" of African historiography in the years c. 1975–1980, with only a handful of post-1980s publications listed in the bibliography. She did however praise the book for its "genuinely continental" geographical coverage, the "excellent quality" maps and photographs, establishing both "regional [and] world linkages" and the range of "eminent scholars" who are given "sufficient space to cover their commissioned subject matter". She also sympathised with the "logistical and financial problems" of such an ambitious project which made the publication delay inevitable, but this was still "too long" given the range of quality works that historians were producing by the mid-1980s.

=== Volume 7 ===
Reviewing the abridged edition of volume 7 for The Journal of African Study, Kirstin Mann felt that "none of the [volume]'s goals [are] wholly realized". She noted that while the individual essays may have adequately "summarized the state of knowledge when they were written", they were now out of date and "little debate emerges within them". Mann however welcomed the chapters on North Africa which can "bridge the divide that too often separates scholarship on North and Sub-Saharan Africa" and commended Albert Adu Boahen on the difficult task of editing the volume. She singled out chapters by Ranger, Ibrahim and Ali, Isaacman and Vansina, Chanaiwa, Crowder, Coquery-Vidrovitch, Afigbo and Atieno-Odhaimbo as those that made "lasting contributions" to African historiography but observed that most chapters lacked any "systematic analysis of struggle, conflict and cleavage within African societies" during the period of study. Mann ultimately summarised the volume as "[passionate] and engaged, if dated, unwieldy and uneven" and criticised the abridged edition's lack of notes and "good bibliography".

=== General ===
- Paul Tiyambe Zeleza writes that the General History of Africa had very little information on women.

== See also ==
- UNESCO History of Humanity - seven volume book series on the scientific and cultural history of humanity.
- The Cambridge History of Africa, published 1975–1986
- African historiography
- History of Africa
- Cradle of humanity
- Cradle of civilization

== Bibliography ==
UNESCO General History of Africa

- Ki-Zerbo, Joseph, ed. (1981). General History of Africa Volume I: Methodology and African Prehistory. California: Heinemann. ISBN 978-0520039124.
- Mokhtar, Gamal, ed. (1981). General History of Africa Volume II: Ancient Civilizations of Africa. California: Heinemann/UNESCO. ISBN 978-92-3-101708-7.
- El Fasi, Mohammad; Hrbek, Ivan, eds. (1988). General History of Africa Volume III: Africa from the Seventh to the Eleventh Century. California: Heinemann/UNESCO. p. v-vii, 796–798. ISBN 978-92-3-101709-4.
- Niane, D.T., ed. (1984). General History of Africa Volume IV: Africa from the Twelfth to the Sixteenth Century. California: Heinemann/UNESCO. ISBN 978-92-3-101710-0.
- Ogot, Bethwell Alan, ed. (1992). General History of Africa Volume V: Africa from the Sixteenth to the Eighteenth Century. California: Heinemann/UNESCO. ISBN 0-520 039165.
- Ajayi, J. F. Ade, ed. (1989). General History of Africa Volume VI: Africa from the Nineteenth century until the 1880s. California: Heinemann/UNESCO. ISBN 978-92-3-101712-4.
- Boahen, Albert Adu, ed. (1985). General History of Africa Volume VII: Africa under colonial domination, 1880-1935. California: Heinemann/UNESCO. ISBN 978-92-3-101713-1.
- Mazrui, Ali A.; Wondji, Christophe, eds. (1993). General History of Africa Volume VIII: Africa since 1935. California: Heinemann/UNESCO. ISBN 978-92-3-102758-1.
- Holl, Augustin F.C., ed. (2025) General history of Africa, IX: General history of Africa revisited. Paris: UNESCO. ISBN 978-92-3-100809-2. Available online only
- Silva Santos, Vanicléia, ed. (2025). General history of Africa, X: Africa and its diasporas. Paris: UNESCO. ISBN 978-92-3-100637-1. Available only only

Additional Sources

- Schulte Nordholt, Larissa. "From Metropole to Margin in UNESCO's General History of Africa – Documents of Historiographical Decolonization in Paris and Ibadan" History in Africa Volume 46, (2019), pp. 403–412
- Christopher Saunders (2006). "The 'General History of Africa' and Southern Africa's Recent Past". Présence Africaine (173): 117–126. JSTOR 43617262.
- Jan Vansina (1993). "UNESCO and African Historiography". History in Africa. 20: 337–352. doi:10.2307/3171979. JSTOR 3171979.
