= Anne Cécile =

Anne Cécile is a French feminine given name. It may refer to:

- Anne-Cécile Ciofani (born 1993), French rugby player
- Anne Desclos (1907–1998), French journalist and novelist
- Anne-Cécile Itier (1890–1980), French racing driver
- Anne Cécile Lequien (born 1977), French Paralympic swimmer
- Anne-Cécile Robert, French journalist
- Anne-Cécile Violland (born 1973), French politician

== See also ==
- Anne
- Cécile
