= Ogot =

Ogot is a surname. Notable people with the surname include:

- Bethwell Allan Ogot (1929–2025), Kenyan historian
- Grace Ogot (1930–2015), Kenyan author
