= Roman roads in Africa =

The Roman Empire in the time of Hadrian (ruled 117-38 AD), showing some of the main roads in Africa

The Roman road network in North Africa

Almost all Roman roads in Africa were built in the first two centuries AD. In 14 AD, Legio III Augusta completed a road from Tacape to Ammaedara: the first Roman road in Africa. In 42 AD, the kingdom of Mauretania was annexed by Rome. Emperor Claudius then restored and widened a Carthaginian trail and extended it west and east. This way the Romans created a continuous coastal highway stretching for 2,100 miles from the Atlantic to the Nile. In 137, Hadrian built the Via Hadriana in the eastern desert of Egypt. It ran from Antinoopolis to Berenice.

Claudius' road that began west of Carthage followed the coastline connecting the coastal towns. From Hippo Regius, on the coast, it continued westwards to Icosium (Algiers), Caesarea (Cherchell), as far as Rusaddir (Melilla) and Tingis (Tangier). It then continued along the Atlantic coast through Iulia Constantia Zilil (Asilah) and Lixus (Larache) to Sala Colonia (near Rabat). East of Carthage the road went through the region of the Carthaginian trading stations Sabratha, Oea-Tripolis, Leptis Magna and Cyrenaica before coming to Alexandria and the lower Nile region.

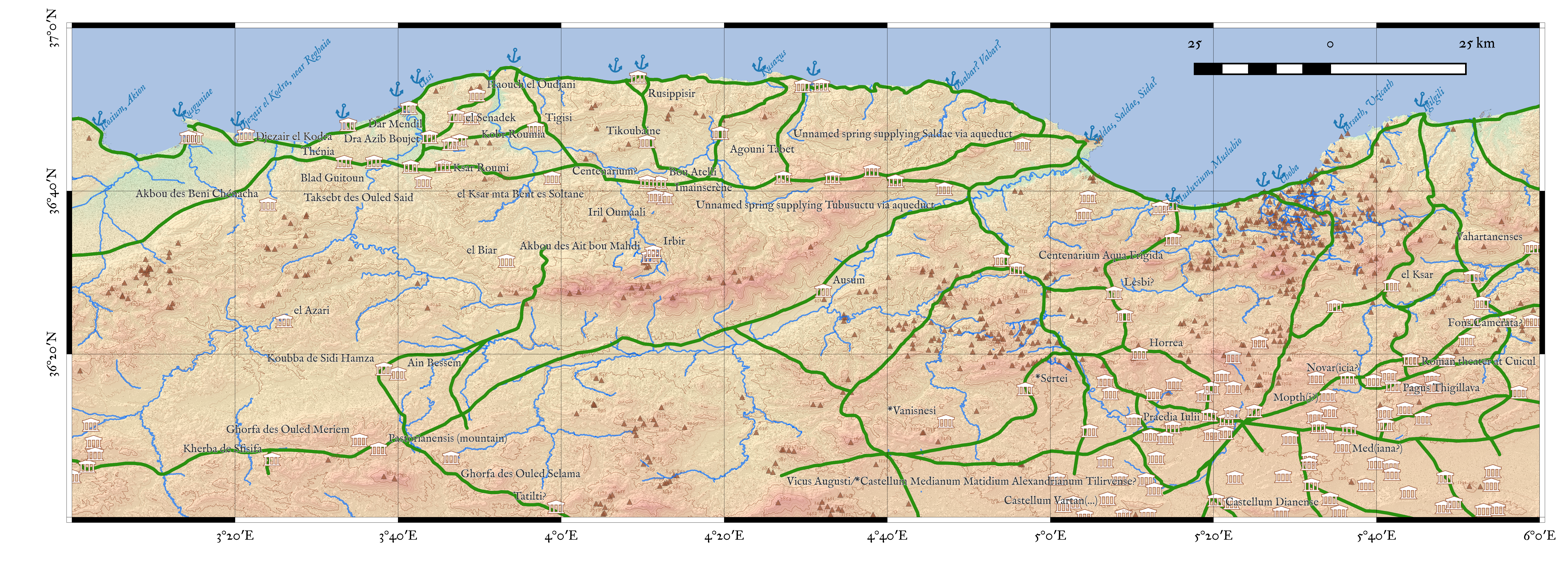
Roman roads between Icosium (Alger) and Saldae (Bejaia)

== Itinaries ==
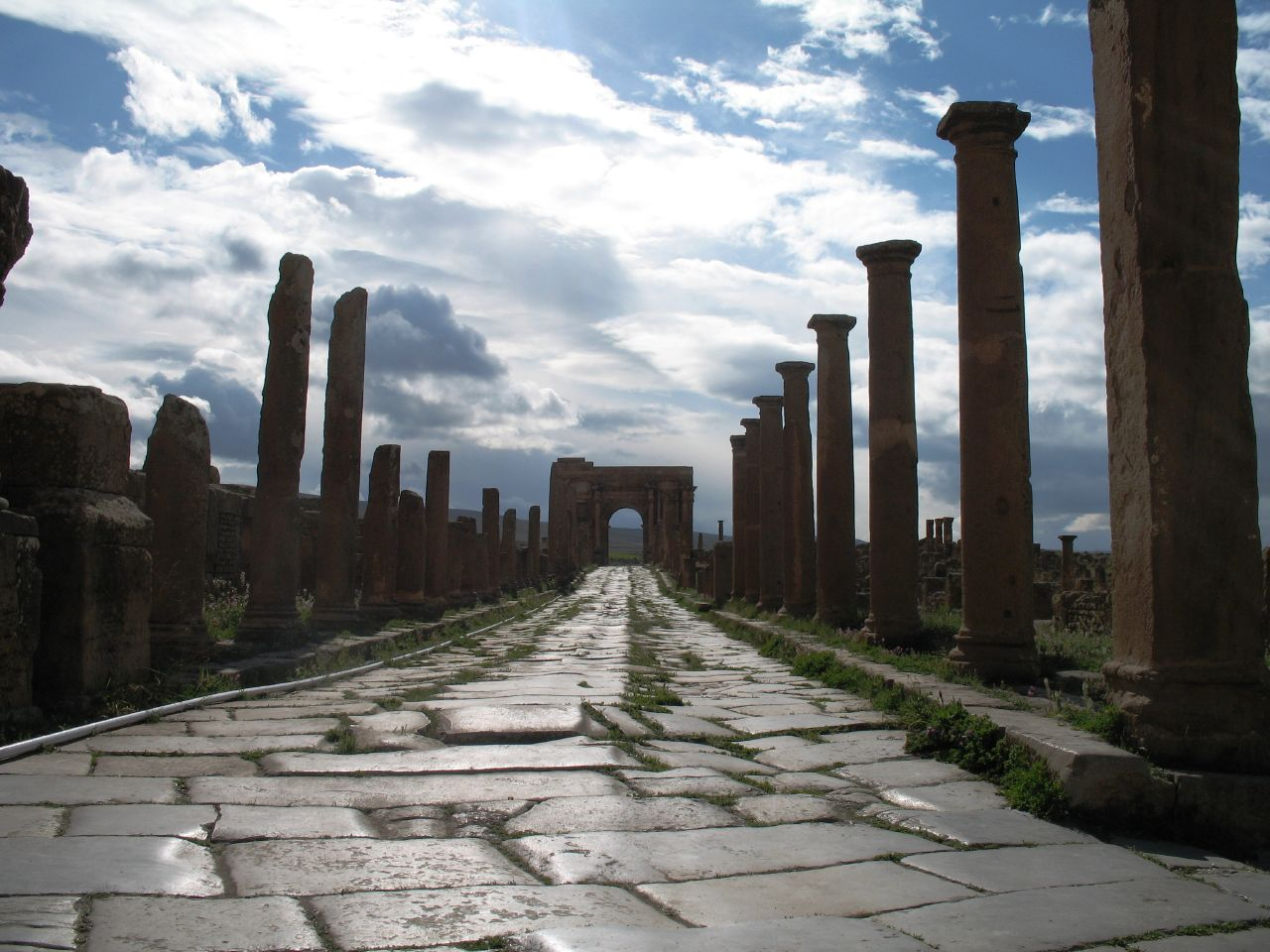
Roman road in Timgad

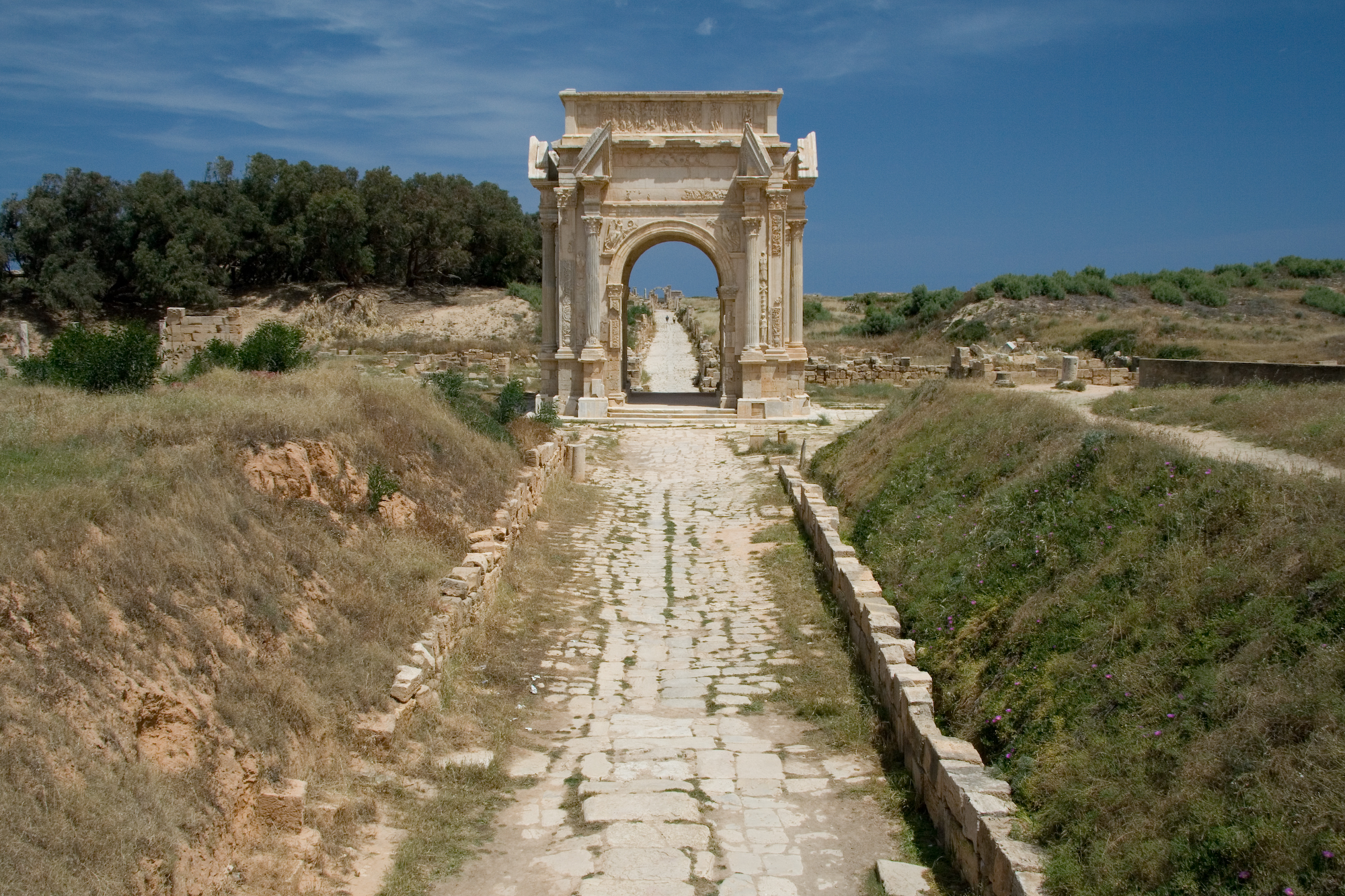
Roman road in Leptis Magna

According to the Antonine Itinerary

- Coastal road through Skikda (Rusicade) to Carthage
- Road from Carthage to Constantine (Cirta)
- Road from Tébessa (Theveste) to Sétif (Sitifi), via Tazoult (Lambese)
- Road from El Krib (Musti (Tunisia)) to Constantine (Cirta)
- Road from Constantine (Cirta) to Annaba (Hippo Regius)
- Road from Annaba (Hippo Regius) to Carthage, via Chemtou (Simitthu)
- Road from Annaba (Hippo Regius) to Carthage, via Le Kef (Sicca Veneria)
- Road from Thyna (Thaenae) to Tébessa (Theveste)
- Road from Haffouz ? (Aquae Regiae) to Sbiba (Sufes)
- Road from Zanfour (Assuras) to Thyna (Thaenae)
- Road from Tebourba (Thuburbo Minus) to Gabès (Tacapes), via Sidi Medien (Vallis)
- Road from Carthage to Sbeïtla (Sufetula), via El Krib (Musti (Tunisia))
- Road from Carthage to Sousse (Hadrumetum), via Sbeïtla (Sufetula)
- Road from El Djem (Thysdrus) to Tébessa (Theveste)
- Road from Tébessa (Theveste) to El Jem (Thysdrus), via Germaniciana (not located)
- Road from Sbiba (Sufes) to Sousse (Hadrumetum)
- Road from El Djem (Thysdrus) to Tébessa (Theveste)
- Road from Tébessa (Theveste) to El Djem (Thysdrus), via Germaniciana (not located)
- Road from Sbiba (Sufes) to Sousse (Hadrumetum)
- Road from Sbeïtla (Sufetula) to Kélibia (Clipea)
- Road from Carthage to Kélibia (Clipea)
- Coastal road from Carthage to Alexandria, via Thyna (Thaenae) and Lebda (Leptis Magna)
- Road called the road of the limes Tripolitanus, from Gabès (Tacapes) to Lebda (Leptis Magna)
- Road from Medina El-Kdima (Thélepte) to Gabès (Tacapes)

According to Peutinger's Table

(only the supplementary roads are given) [to be completed]

- Roads from Gabès (Tacapes) to Medina El-Kdima (Thélepte), via Nefta (Nepte) and alternatives
- Roads from Medina El-Kdima (Thélepte) to Takembrit (Siga and alternatives)
- Road from El Djem (Thysdrus) to Tébessa (Theveste), via Jama (Zama Regia)
- Road from El Djem (Thysdrus) to Aïn Hedja (Agbia), via Henchir Kasbat (Thuburbo Majus)

== See also ==
- Limes Tripolitanus
- Roman roads
- Roman roads in Morocco
- Via Hadriana

== Sources ==
- Schneider, Eugenia Equini (June 1984). "North Africa's great Roman road; from Alexandria to Gibraltar". UNESCO Courier. Archived from the original on December 24, 2007 – via FindArticles.
- Pierre Salama, Les voies romaines de l'Afrique du Nord, Algiers, 1951

== Bibliography ==
- Baradez, J., "Réseau routier de la zone arrière du limes de Numidie," Limes-Studien III (Basel 1959) 19–30.
- Benzina Ben Abdallah, Zeïneb, " À propos d' un pont de la voie de Carthage à Théveste, construit sous Hadrien, à l'entrée d'Ammaedara," BCTH(B) 24 (1993–1995) 95–100.
- Corò, F., "Le antiche strade romane della Tripolitania occidentale," RCI (1931) 1-20; 103–116.
- Euzennat, M., "Les voies romaines du Maroc dans l' Itineraire d' Antonin," Hommages à Albert Grenier (Bruxelles 1962) II, 595–610.
- Goodchild, R. G., The Roman Roads and Milestones of Tripolitania (London 1948).
- Hammond, N., "The Limes Tripolitanus. A Roman Road in North Africa," JBAA 30 (1967) 1–18.
- Marcillet-Jaubert, J., "Bornes milliaires de Numidie," Ant Afr 16 (1980) 161–184.
- Mattingly, D. J., "The Roman Road-Station at Thenadassa (Ain Wuf)," SLS 13 (1982) 73–80.
- Moran, C. & G. Gustavino Gallent, Vias y poblaciones romanas en el Norte de Marruecos (Madrid 1948).
- Morizot, Pierre, "Les voies romaines de Lambèse à « Calceus Herculis » (El Kantara, Algérie)," AntAfr 34 (1998) 149–155.
- Ponsich, M., "Kouass, port antique et carrefour des voies de la Tingitane," BAM 7 (1967) 369–405.
- Romanelli, P., Le grandi strade romane nell' Africa (Roma 1938).
- Salama, Pierre, "Le reseau routier de l' Afrique romaine," CRAI (1948) 395–399.
- Salama, P., Les voies romaines de l' Afrique du Nord (Algiers 1951).
- Salama, Pierre, Bornes milliaires d' Afrique proconsulaire (Paris/Tunis 1987).
- Salama, Pierre, " Anomalies et aberrations rencontreées sur des incriptions milliaires de la voie romaine Ammaedara-Capsa-Tacapes," Zeitschrift für Papyrologie und Epigraphik 149 (2004) 245–255.
- Tissot, Charles, "Le bassin du Bagrada et la voie romaine de Carthage à Hippone par Bulla Regia," Memoires de l' Acad. des Inscriptions (Paris 1881).
