= Bethwell Allan Ogot =

Kenyan historian (1929–2025)

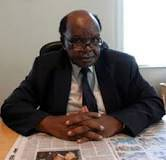
- Born: 3 August 1929; Gem, Colony and Protectorate of Kenya
- Died: 30 January 2025 (aged 95)
- Citizenship: Kenyan
- Education: Makerere University; University of St. Andrews; School of Oriental and African Studies (PhD)
- Occupation: Historian
- Spouse: Grace Emily Akinyi (m. 1959; died 2015)
- Writing career
- Genres: African history, East African history, Kenyan history
- Notable works: Zamani: A Survey of East African History, History of the Southern Luo

Bethwell Allan Ogot (3 August 1929 – 30 January 2025) was a Kenyan historian and academic who specialised in African history, research methods, and theory. One of his works started by saying that "to tell the story of a past so as to portray an inevitable destiny is, for humankind, a need as universal as tool-making. To that extent, we may say that a human being is, by nature, historicus".

Ogot was the Chancellor of Moi University up to early 2013.

== Biography ==
Ogot, a Kenyan Luo, was born on 3 August 1929 in Gem Location of Siaya County of Kenya. In 1959 he married Grace Emily Akinyi, a politician, writer, and health specialist. She eventually served the government of Kenya as an Assistant Minister for Culture and Social Services.

Ogot was educated at Ambira, Maseno School, Makerere University College, and the University of St Andrews and the School of Oriental and African Studies, University of London. While studying in London, he served as a leader of the Kenya Students Association, where he assisted the Kenya nationalists, notably the late Jaramogi Oginga Odinga during the 1960 negotiations at the Lancaster negotiations for Kenya's independence.

Ogot commenced his university academic and research life as lecturer at the Makerere University, and eventually became Chairman of the History Department of University College, Nairobi, currently the University of Nairobi (UoN). At the UoN he founded and directed the Institute of Development Studies (IDS) and the Institute of African Studies (IAS). He also served as the Dean of the School of Arts and Social Sciences and Deputy Vice-Chancellor Academics therein. He was the President of the International Scientific Committee for the preparation of UNESCO's General History of Africa. He edited Volume V of UNESCO's History of Africa, and presided over the committee that oversaw the production of the entire History. He was a member of the International Commission for UNESCO's History of Humanity.

From the University of Nairobi, Ogot was appointed by President Jomo Kenyatta to serve as member of the East African Community (EAC) Legislative Assembly, between 1975 and 1977. He was President of the PanAfrican Archaeological Association from 1977 to 1983. Between 1978 and 1980 Ogot served at the International Louis Leakey Memorial Institute for African Pre-History (TILLMIAP), which was an integral part of the National Museums of Kenya (NMK), as its first director. He served Kenyatta University as a Professor, and the Kenya Post and Telecommunications as chairman. He was the Chancellor of Moi University, Eldoret, up to 2013. Up until his death in 2025 he remained a Professor Emeritus of Maseno University, where prior to being Chancellor of Moi University he had been the Director of Post-Graduate Studies.

As the Chancellor of Moi University, he worked tirelessly with President Mwai Kibaki, the Ministry of Higher Education of Kenya, Professors David Some and Richard Mibey as Vice-Chancellors and Samuel Gudu, Margarete Kamar and Bob Wishitemi to oversee the constitution of the Masinde Muliro University of Science and Technology, Narok University, Karatina University, Kabianga University, University of Eldoret, Rongo University College and the Odera Akango' College, which remains a constituent college of Moi University.

Ogot died following a short illness on 30 January 2025, at the age of 95. In 2026 the National Heroes Council of Kenya named Bethwell Ogot a national hero. The citation begins: "Prof. Ogot is honoured posthumously for his outstanding contribution to African historiography, higher education, and research."

== Awards and honours ==
- Distinguished Africanist Award (2001) of the African Studies Association, presented annually in recognition of a lifetime of notable service to African studies.
- UNESCO's Gold Medal
- Averos Medal
- Elder of the Burning Spears (EBS)
- Hon.D.Litt of Kenyatta University
- In 2012, the African Studies Association (ASA) established the Bethwell A. Ogot Book Prize, an annual award given at the ASA meeting to the author of the best book on East African Studies
- Grieve Prize in Moral Philosophy from the University of St Andrews.

== Selected works ==
- Editor, East Africa, Past and Present, 1964.
- With F. B. Welbourn, A Place to Feel at Home, 1966. (A study of two independent churches in western Kenya)
- History of the Southern Luo: Volume I, Migration and Settlement, 1500–1900 (Series: Peoples of East Africa), East African Publishing House, Nairobi, 1967. (Apparently Vol II never published)
- Editor, with J. A. Kieran, Zamani: A Survey of East African History (Nairobi: East African Publishing House Ltd, 1968. Reprint with corrections, 1969. ISBN 0-582-60293-9
- Editor, Politics and Nationalism in Colonial Kenya: Proceedings of the 1971 Conference of the Historical Association of Kenya – HADITH 4, Nairobi: East African Publishing House), 1971
- Editor, with William R. Ochieng', Decolonization and Independence in Kenya, 1940–93, London: James Currey, 1995, ISBN 0-85255-705-1.
- Building on the Indigenous: Selected Essays 1981–1998. Kisumu: Anyange Press, 1999
- Editors, with Toyin Falola and E. S. Atieno Odhiambo, The Challenges of History and Leadership in Africa: The Essays of Bethwell Allan Ogot (Trenton and Asmara: Africa World Press, 2002. ISBN 1-59221-005-8.
- History as Destiny and History as Knowledge: Being Reflections on the Problems of Historicity and Historiography. Kisumu: Anyange Press, 2005
- My Footprints on the Sands of Time: An Autobiography, Trafford Publishing, 2006. ISBN 1-4120-0340-7
- A History of the Luo-Speaking Peoples of East Africa. Kisumu: Anyange Press, 2009
- Liberty or Death: Southern Sudan's March to Independence. Nairobi: The Regal Press Kenya Ltd, 2010.
- Who, if Anyone Owns the Past? Reflections on the Meaning of "Public History". Kisumu: Anyange Press, 2010.
- My Footprints on the Sands of Time: An Autobiography. Kisumu: Anyange Press, 2011.

== See also ==
- Luo people of Kenya, Tanzania and Uganda
