= Pierre Kipré =

Ivoirian historian (born 1945)

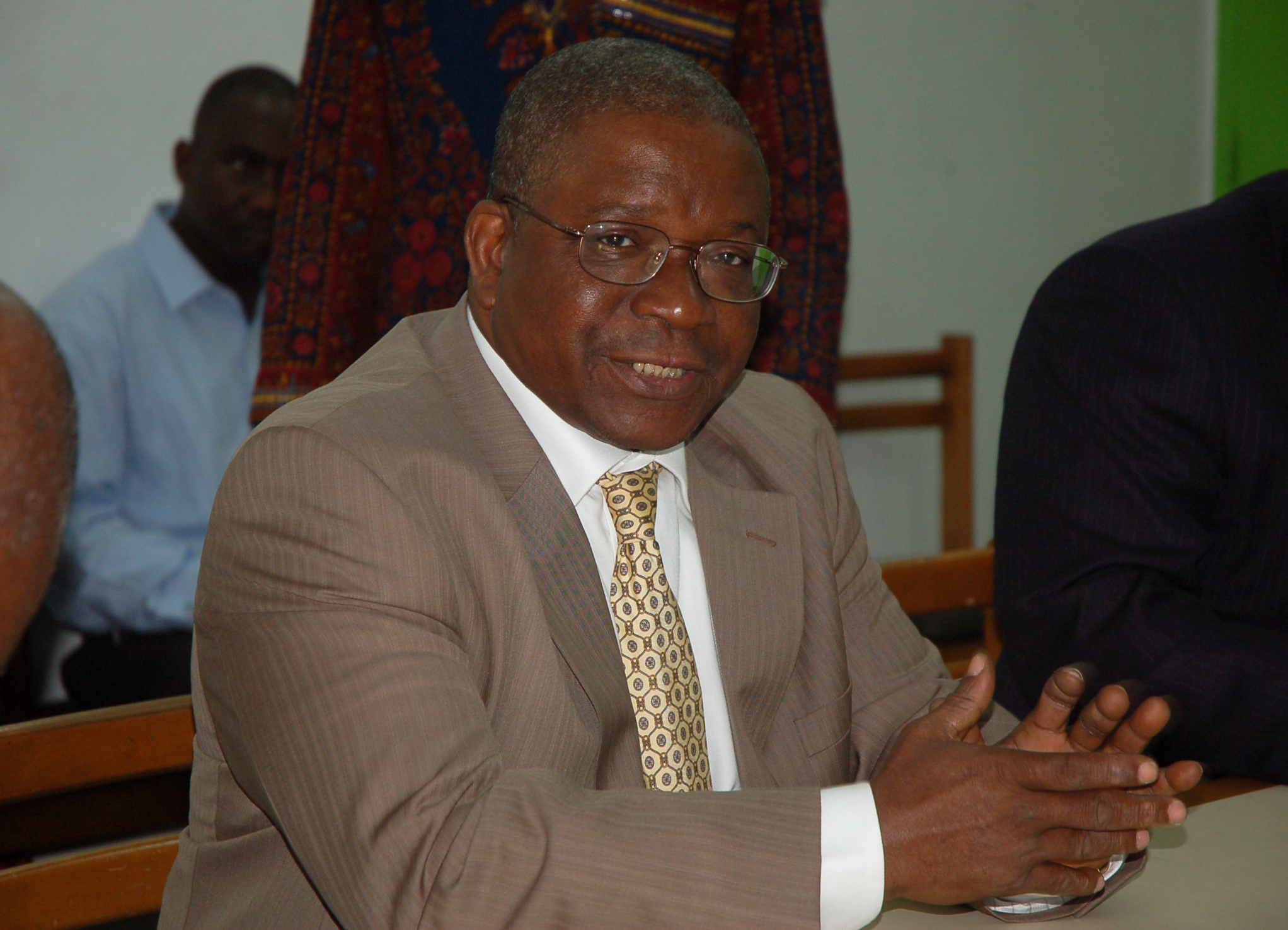
Ivorian writer, historian Pierre Kipré

Pierre Kipré (born 23 February 1945 in Daloa) is a historian and writer from Ivory Coast. He is a former student of the École normale supérieure in Abidjan.

Pierre Kipré was the ambassador of Ivory Coast in France with residence in Paris until 2010. He was replaced by Ally Coulibaly. During the 2010–11 Ivorian crisis, he sided with president Laurent Gbagbo.

In 1987, his book Villes de Côte d’Ivoire (1893–1940) earned him the Noma Award for Publishing in Africa.

== Publications ==
=== Personal works ===
- 1975: Le président Félix Houphouët-Boigny et la nation ivoirienne, collection of annotated text, preceded by a presentation, Abidjan, N.E.A., 333 p.
- 1985: Daloa, une cité dans l’histoire, Abidjan, SIIS, 54 p.
- 1985: Villes de Côte d'Ivoire (1893-1940). Tome 1, La fondation des villes, Abidjan, N.E.A., 275 p.
- 1986: Villes de Côte d'Ivoire (1893-1940). Tome 2, Économie et société urbaine, Abidjan, N.E.A., 290 p.
- 1987: Les relations internationales : de la Première Guerre mondiale à la crise cubaine de 1962, Abidjan, Publications de l'ENS d'Abidjan, series "Les cours de CAPES"
- 1988: La Côte d'Ivoire coloniale (1890-1940), tome 2, Abidjan, AMI/Bordas, series "Mémorial de la Côte d'Ivoire", 303 p.
- 1989: Le congrès de Bamako ou La naissance du RDA, Paris, Éditions Chaka, 190 p.
- 1991: Histoire de Côte d'Ivoire, Abidjan, Paris, AMI/EDICEF, series "Manuels du premier cycle", 195 p.
- 2000: Démocratie et société en Côte d'Ivoire : essai politique, Abidjan, Éd. AMI, 105 p., 2000
- 2005: (with S. Brunel and M-A. Pérouse de Montclos), L'aide au Tiers monde à quoi bon ?, Paris, les Éditions de l'Atelier, 115 p.
- 2005: Côte d'Ivoire : la formation d'un peuple, Paris, Éd. SIDES-IMA, 292 p.
- 2006: Intégration régionale et développement rural en Afrique de l’Ouest, Paris, Édition SIDES – IMA, 144 p.
- 2009: Inventaire critique des manuels d’histoire en Afrique francophone, Paris, Éditions de l’UNESCO, 78 p.
- 2010: Les migrations en Afrique de l’Ouest et la fabrication de l’étranger, Abidjan, Éditions du CERAP, 160 p.
- 2014: Cultures et identités nationales en Afrique de l'Ouest : le Daa dans la societe beninoise d'hier a demain, L'Harmattan, 220 p.

=== Direction of collective works ===
- 1992: (codir. with L. Harding), Commerce et commerçants en Afrique : la Côte d'Ivoire, Paris, L'Harmattan, 295 p.
- 2001: (codir. with Aké G-M. Ngbo), Conflits régionaux et indépendances nationales en Afrique de l’Ouest, Paris, L'Harmattan, 128 p.
- 2011: (codir. with Aké G-M. Ngbo), Les conditions économiques de l'indépendance à l'ère de la mondialisation : mythes et réalités en Afrique de l’Ouest, L'Harmattan

=== Collective works ===
Pierre Kitré contributed to some forty collective works, including:

- L’Afrique depuis 1935, Paris and Abidjan, Éditions UNESCO et N.E.I., p. 403-438
- Les populations africaines de la Côte atlantique, du Bandama à la Volta (XIIe- XVIe siècles in D. T. Niane (éd.), "Histoire générale de l’Afrique", UNESCO/N.E.A, 1985, vol. 4, chap. 13, p. 355-370
- Dictionnaire Borremans – La Côte d’Ivoire et ses cultures (articles d’histoire et de géographie des tomes 1 et 2), Abidjan, N.E.A., 1986
- Sociétés urbaines et pratiques de l'espace : le cas ivoirien de 1930 à 1960, in C. Coquery-Vidrovitch. (éd.), "Processus d'urbanisation en Afrique", L'Harmattan, 1988, p. 37-45
- L'interface Sahara-Sahel dans la géopolitique en Afrique noire (XIIe-XXe siècles), in Le Sahel, Ministère de la Coopération, Paris, 1989
- (with A. Tirefort) La Côte d’Ivoire, in C. Coquery-Vidrovitch (éd.), "L'Afrique Occidentale au temps des Français", Paris, La Découverte, 1992
- Le développement industriel et la croissance urbaine in A. Mazrui & Chr. Wondji (éd.), "Histoire générale de l’Afrique. Tome VIII", 1998
- L'Afrique et ses avenirs, in Y. Michaud (éd.), "Qu'est-ce que la culture ?", Paris, Éditions Odile Jacob, 2001, p. 91-104
- Les discours politiques de décembre 1999 à l'élection présidentielle d'octobre 2000 : thèmes, enjeux et confrontations, in C. Vidal and M. LePape (éd.), "Côte d'Ivoire : l'année terrible", Paris, Karthala, 2002, p. 81-122
- Les méthodes et problèmes de l'histoire africaine (chapter 1) and Les mutations contemporaines en Afrique (chapter 8), in Paul Vandepitte et Maria Turano (éd.), "Pour une histoire de l'Afrique : douze parcours", Lecce/Italia, Édition ARGO, 2003
- Postface by Anne-Cécile Robert, L'Afrique au secours de l'Occident, Paris, Éditions Le Monde et Éditions de l(Atelier, 2005, p. 203-205
- De l'immigration à l'intégration : le cas des villages burkinabé de la région de la Marahoué, in Chantal Chanson-Jabeur ad Odile Goerg (éd.), "Mama Africa : hommage à Catherine Coquery-Vidrovitch", Paris, L'Harmattan, 2005, p. 169-182
- Les frontières et la question nationale en Afrique de l'Ouest, in UNESCO/CISH, '"Des frontières en Afrique du XII au XX", Paris, Éditions de l'UNESCO, 2005, p. 91-115
- L'intégration régionale et les tâches des intellectuels ouest-africains, in Souleymane Yéo (ed.), "Les États nations face à l'intégration régionale en Afrique de l'Ouest : le cas de la Côte d'Ivoire", Paris, Karthala, 2009, p. 25-42
- De la Côte d'Ivoire coloniale, in "L'Afrique en noir et blanc : Louis-Gustave Binger, explorateur", Paris, Somogy éditions d'art, 2009, p. 185-197
