= Zakari Dramani-Issifou =

Beninese-French writer and academic

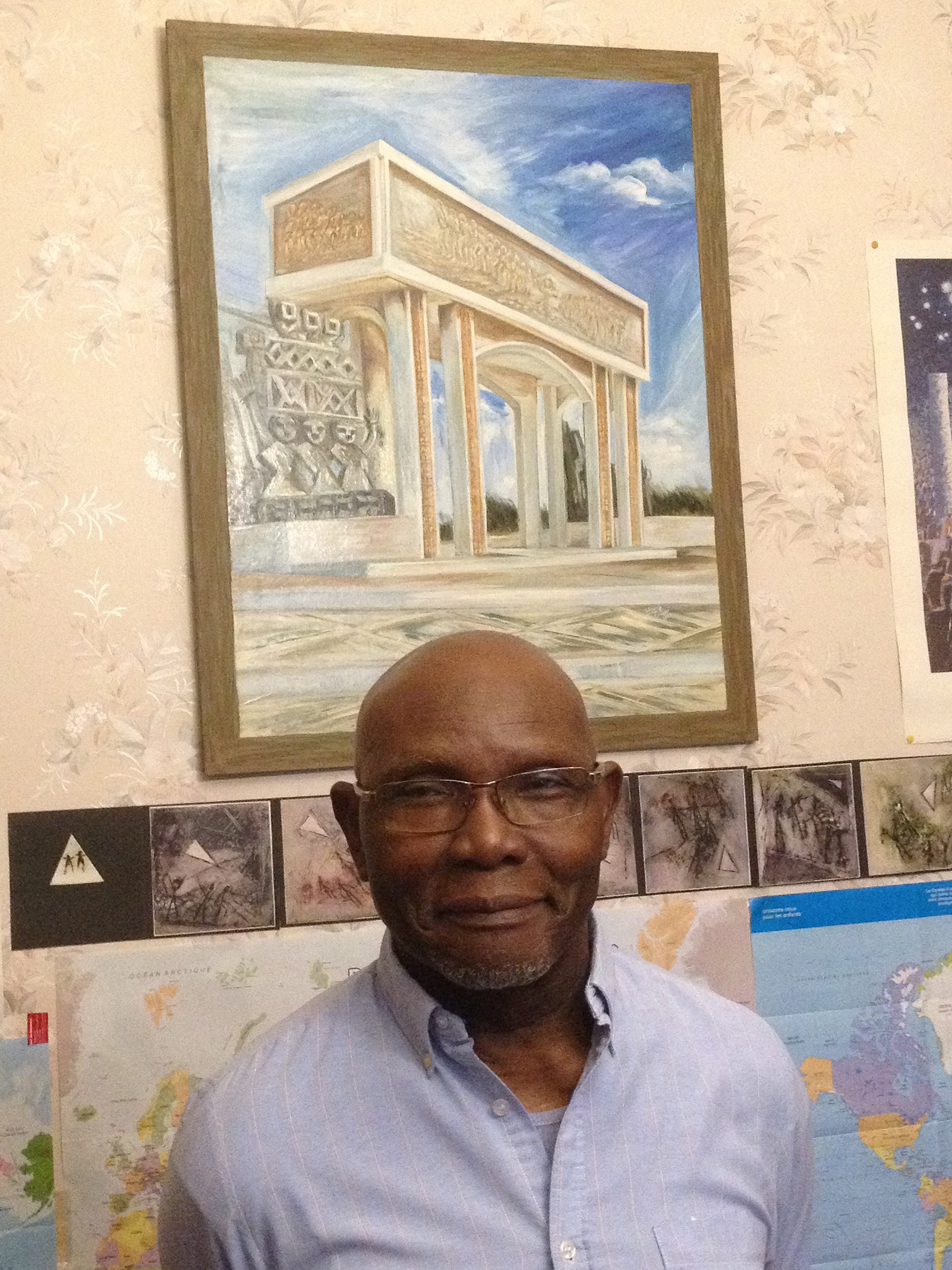
- Zakari Dramani-Issifou in 2020
- Born: August 22, 1940; Djougou, Benin
- Occupations: Poet, writer, historian, academic

Zakari Dramani-Issifou, also known as Bazini Zakari Dramani, (born August 22, 1940, in Djougou, Benin) is a poet, writer, historian, and academic of Beninese and French nationality. He also serves as a consultant for UNESCO in pedagogy and didactics. He has contributed to the writing of the General History of Africa in eight volumes, under the auspices of UNESCO.

== Biography ==
Dramani-Issifou was born on August 22, 1940, in Djougou, where he attended primary school. He continued his secondary education at Victor Ballot High School in Porto-Novo.

He pursued higher education at the University of Dakar, but was arrested in 1963 following a student movement, and subsequently released. He left Senegal to avoid further arrest and settled in France, in Caen, where he resumed his studies in history and geography.

In 1975, he defended a postgraduate thesis in history entitled Les relations entre le Maroc et l'empire Sonrhaï dans la seconde moitié du 16th century at the University of Paris VIII-Vincennes.

He also taught at Jean Rostand High School in Caen and was a member of the Center for Research in African Civilization (CERASA). He was a lecturer at the National University of Benin (1978–1986) and later at the University of Paris VIII (1983–1990, 1993–1994).

In addition, he collaborated on numerous scientific works, such as the General History of Africa in eight volumes, under the auspices of UNESCO. He authored Chapter 4 of Volume III, "Islam as a Social System in Africa since the 7th century".

== Publications ==
=== Literary works ===
- Le nouveau cri, 1965 (poetry)
- Récidive (mots pour maux), Le Dé bleu, 1985 (poetry)
- Les dires de l'arbre-mémoire : voix initiatiques, 1999 (poetry)
- Le fil à couper le cœur (short story, based on a painting by Alain Letort), based on an investigation by Harry Dickson, Presses Universitaires de Caen, 2002, 21 p.
- Convergences en 10. Dialogue écrivain-peintre, 10 texts by Z. Dramani-Issifou and 10 inks by Françoise Lelouch-Cochet, Dozulé, Les Éditions du Chameau, Plum’Art Collection, No. 10, 2005.
- "Le souffle de l'arbre fétiche de Cewelxa", story in Carnet d’esquisses, Dozulé, Les Éditions du Chameau, 2007, p. 13-23.
- De la Métaphore au Manifeste, bilingual Spanish/French text for the public presentation of "Africa Genitrix", Santo Domingo, 15 June 2015, 4 p.

=== Academic works and publications ===
- Dramani-Issifou, Zakari (1981). "Routes de commerce et mise en place des populations du Nord du Bénin actuel". Publications de la Société française d'histoire des outre-mers. 5 (2): 655–672.
- L'Afrique noire dans les relations internationales au 16th century, Karthala, 1982 (revised text of thesis)
- "Le champ sémantique de l'ethnicité chez Ahmed Baba dans le Mi'raj al-Suhud (XVIe – XVIIe siècles)", in Les Ethnies ont une histoire, Chrétien (J.-P) and Prunier (G.), eds., Paris, Karthala, 1989
- "L'Histoire inhumaine. Massacres, génocide, des origines à nos jours", Le continent africain, chapter 14, Paris, Armand Colin, 1992
- Les Songhay, dimension historique, in Les Vallées du Niger, Scientific Catalog of the National Museum of African and Oceanic Arts, Paris, Éditions de la Réunion des Musées nationaux, 1993
- "Rapport sur l’utilisation des ouvrages de l’Histoire Générale de l’Afrique (UNESCO, 8 volumes) à des fins pédagogiques": in International Scientific Committee for the Research of an African History – Last plenary session April 10–13 April 1999, Tripoli (Libyan Arab Jamahiriya).
- "Djougou : Commerce international et multi-culturalité. Un essai d’histoire sociale et culturelle de Zougou-Wangara du XIV^{e} à l’aube du XXI^{e} siècle" for the journal Interfaces, December 1999 – 39 pages N

== Distinctions ==
1981: Poetry Prize – Ministry of Culture of Benin for the collection Le Soleil à travers les Palmes. In 1986, he was honored by the French Academy with the bronze medal of the Grand Poetry Prize for Récidive (Mots pour Maux). In 1999, he was appointed Knight of the Order of Arts and Letters by the French Republic. 2005: National Poetry Prize – Poètes et Artistes du Bourbonnais for the collection Le Nouveau Cri. Prize for the collection Les Dires de l’Arbre Mémoire.
