= Madina Ly-Tall =

Malian historian & diplomat (born 1940)

- Born: April 25, 1940 (age 86); Bandiagara, French Sudan
- Education: University of Paris
- Occupations: Educator; historian; diplomat

Madina Ly-Tall (born 25 April 1940 in Bandiagara) is a Malian educator, historian and diplomat.

Ly-Tall was born into a political family, being a descendant of El Hadj Umar Tall, founder of the Toucouleur Empire and her father was a member of the Sudanese Progressive Party (PSP). She received her schooling in Koutiala from 1947 to 1952 before enrolling in a four-year course at the Modern College of Young Women in Bamako. She subsequently studied at the Lycée Terrasson de Fougère. She joined the African Independence Party (PAI) in 1958, before moving to Toulouse, France for further studying. While in France she was active with the Federation of Students of Black Africa in France (FEANF) before returning to Mali in 1965.

Ly-Tall taught at various schools in Bamako in the latter half of the 1960s, including the Lycée Askia Mohamed in Bamako (1965–1966), the Lycée des Jeunes Filles (1966–1967) and École Normale Secondaire de Filles (1967–1968), and was headmistress of the latter two. She returned to France in 1969 where she settled in Villiers-le-Bel and did work for UNESCO while studying African history at the Sorbonne. From 1972 Ly-Tall was an opponent of the military regime in her native country and she was exiled from the country in the late 1970s, moving to Dakar, Senegal. In Dakar she published works such as Contribution à l'histoire de l'Empire du Mali (XIIe-XVIe siècles) : limites, principales provinces, institutions politiques in 1977 and Un Islam militant en Afrique de l'ouest au XIXE Siecle in 1991. While in Dakar her family became involved with the Malian Party for the Revolution and Democracy (PMRD) and various groups within the National Democratic and Popular Front (FNDP). She returned to Mali during the 1991 Malian revolution, where she was appointed vice-president of the National Conference just as the new democratic regime was being drafted. She participated in the political campaign of Alpha Oumar Konaré in 1992. Ly-Tall has since spent time in both her native country and France.
