= Pierre Salama =

French classical archaeologist and epigrapher

- Born: 2 January 1917; Algiers
- Died: 2 April 2009 (aged 92); Paris
- Occupations: Historian; Archaeologist

Pierre Salama (2 January 1917 – 2 April 2009) was a French historian and archaeologist, specialist of Roman roads in Africa as well as milestones. An epigrapher, numismatist, he was also a specialist of historical geography.

== Publications ==
- 1948: Le réseau routier de l'Afrique romaine, Comptes rendus de l'Académie des inscriptions et belles-lettres, p. 395-399 (online) ;
- 1949: Carte du réseau routier de l'Afrique romaine; nouv. éd. 2010 (Bibliothèque de l'Antiquité tardive, 17) ISSN 1637-9918 ISBN 9782503513201 ;
- 1951: Les voies romaines de l'Afrique du Nord
- 1987: Bornes milliaires d'Afrique proconsulaire
- 2000: Le Sahara pendant l'Antiquité classique, Gamal Mokhtar [under the dir. of], Histoire générale de l'Afrique, vol. II « L'Afrique ancienne », éd. Présence Africaine/Edicef/Unesco, p. 553-574 ;
- 2005: Numerous articles including 22 reprinted in Promenades d'antiquités africaines : scripta varia with Jean-Pierre Laporte
