= E. J. Alagoa =

Nigerian academic, historian and author

Chief Ebiegberi Joe Alagoa (born 14 April 1933) OON, FNAL, is a Nigerian academic and author. He is a fellow of the Nigerian Academy of Letters.

== Early life and education ==
Alagoa was born on 14 April 1933, in Nembe, Bayelsa State, Nigeria to Joseph Ayibatonye and Jane Furombogha. He attended University College (now University of Ibadan). He graduated from University of London, with a Bachelor of Arts (with honors) in 1959. In 1960, he earned a certificate in Archive Administration from American University and a certificate in African Studies from University of Wisconsin in 1965 and PhD 1966.

== Career ==
Alagoa worked at the National Archives of Nigeria, Ibadan from 1959 to 1962 rising to the rank of a senior archivist. From 1965 to 1967, he worked as a lecturer in African History in University of Lagos and later as a professor of History and director of Centre of Cultural Studies from 1972 to 1977. He was a senior research fellow at the Institute of African Studies at the University of Ibadan from 1967 to 1972. Alagoa worked at the University of Port Harcourt, as the dean of School of Humanities from 1977 to 1980 and the deputy vice chancellor from 1980 to 1981. He served briefly as the vice chancellor of the university in 1982.

Alagoa was a visiting scholar at Frobenius Institute in 1989, a Bellagio Study and Conference Center resident scholar in 1990; and a Brown University research scholar from 1993 to 1994.

He was made the pro-chancellor of Niger Delta University in 2001.

== Personal life ==
Alagoa married Mercy Gboribusuote Nyananyo on 26 September 1961 and have a child, David Ayibatonye.

== Awards and honours ==
- Fulbright scholar, 1983 to 1984
- Rockefeller Foundation scholar, 1990
- Justice of the Peace of Bayelsa State, 1999
- Officer Order of the Niger, 2000
- Fellow Nigerian Academy of Letters
