= Anne-Cécile Robert =

French journalist

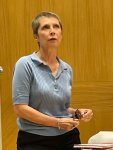

Anne-Cécile Robert is a French journalist specializing in European institutions and Africa, a member of the editorial board and management board of Le Monde diplomatique. She is particularly interested in political and institutional systems and democracy, its limitations and operations.

PhD in European Union law, Anne-Cécile Robert is also associate professor at the Institute of European Studies of the université Paris-VIII.

She opposed the Treaty establishing a Constitution for Europe.

She is vice-president of the association for a constituent.

== Works ==
- 2001: with André Bellon: Un Totalitarisme tranquille : La démocratie confisquée . Syllepse
- 2003: with André Bellon et Claude Nicolet: Le Peuple inattendu. Syllepse
- 2004: L'Afrique au secours de l'Occident, preface by Boubacar Boris Diop, postface by Pierre Kipré.
- 2008: with Jean-Christophe Servant: Afriques années zéro, Editions Atalante
- 2018: La stratégie de l'émotion, preface by Eric Dupond-Moretti.
