= Mohamed Hédi Chérif =

Tunisian historian and academic (1932–2021)

- Born: 23 July 1932; Tunis, French Tunisia
- Died: 23 January 2021 (aged 88)
- Occupation: Historian

Mohamed Hédi Chérif (Arabic: محمد الهادي الشريف) (23 July 1932 – 23 January 2021) was a Tunisian historian and academic. He specialized in the modern and contemporary history of Tunisia.

== Biography ==
After his studies at Sadiki College and the École pratique des hautes études, he earned an agrégation in history in Paris and a doctorate from the Sorbonne in 1979. He was a researcher at the French National Centre for Scientific Research from 1970 to 1974 before becoming a professor at the Faculty of Humanities and Social Sciences of Tunis for over thirty years. He served as dean from 1987 to 1990.

A professor emeritus at Tunis University, he was a member of the Tunisian Council for Scientific and Technological Research, as well as a founding member of the Tunisian Academy of Sciences, Letters, and Arts. He worked several times as a visiting professor in Maghreb, Europe, and the Middle East. He also coordinated the Tunisian Republic's microfilming efforts at the French Ministry of Europe and Foreign Affairs, to repatriate the archives of colonialism to Tunisia, and directed the history department at the Centre d'études et de recherches économiques et sociales. He once served as Editor-in-Chief of Les Cahiers de Tunisie.

Chérif was one of the founders of the General Union of Higher Education and Scientific Research at the Tunisian General Labour Union and was a recruiter for Tunisian higher education. In 1987, he was appointed to the committee on awarding the literature and arts prize of the Tunisian Ministry of Culture. He was very well known for his research on the Husainid dynasty.

Mohamed Hédi Chérif died on 23 January 2021 at the age of 88.

== Honours ==
- Officier (1969), then Commander of the Order of the Tunisian Republic (1971)
- Officier of the National Order of Merit of Tunisia (1992)
- Commander of the Tunisian Order of Independence (2013)
- Knight of the National Order for work (Tunisia)

== Publications ==
- (1980) تاريخ تونس : من عصور ما قبل التاريخ إلى الإستقلال
- Pouvoir et société dans la Tunisie de H'usayn Bin Ali (1705-1740) (1984)
- Histoire générale de l'Afrique, t. VI : L'Afrique au XIXe jusque vers les années 1880 (1996)
- Histoire générale de l'Afrique, t. V : L'Afrique du XVIe au XVIIIe siècle (1999)
- Individu et pouvoir dans les pays islamo-méditerranéens (2009)
