= Ambira =

- Location within Kenya
- Coordinates: 0.18°N 34.27°E
- Country: Kenya
- County: Siaya County
- Time zone: UTC+3 (EAT)

Ambira is a settlement in Kenya's Siaya County.

== Infrastructure ==
The Ambira sub-country hospital is located in the village of Ambira, which served as a government vaccination site for the COVID-19 vaccine. Ambira also has one primary school and one secondary school.
