= Via Hadriana =

Roman road between the Nile and the Red Sea

The Via Hadriana was an ancient Roman road established by the emperor Hadrian, which stretched from Antinoöpolis on the River Nile to the Red Sea at Berenice Troglodytica (Berenike). Hadrian had founded Antinoöpolis in memory of his presumed lover, the youth Antinous, who had drowned in the Nile. The Via Hadriana was finished in 137 AD. Traces of the road line were noted by Couyat (1910) and Murray (1925).
