= Catherine Coquery-Vidrovitch =

French historian (born 1935)

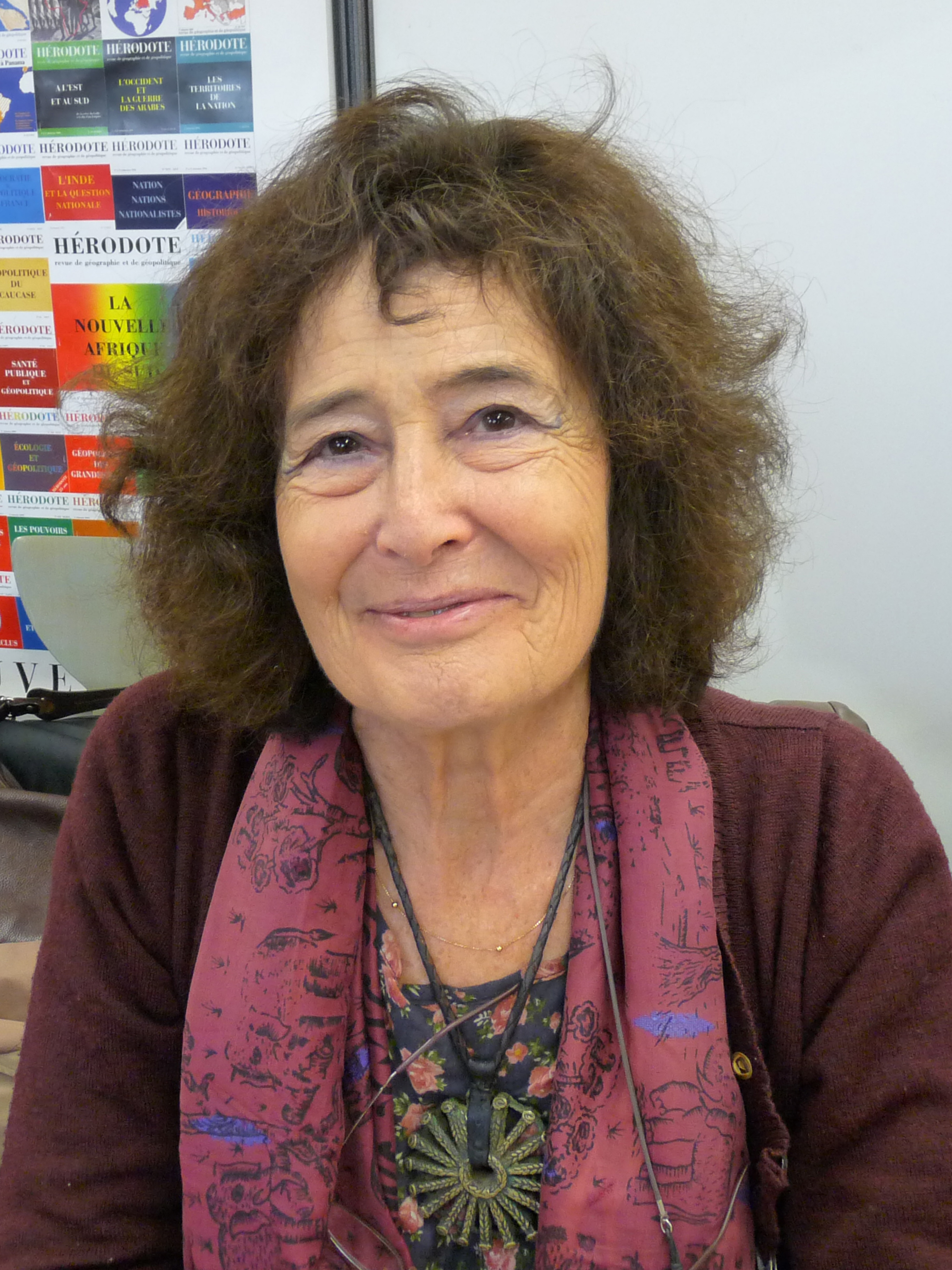
- Coquery-Vidrovitch in 2011
- Born: November 25, 1935 (age 90); Paris, France
- Education: École normale supérieure de Sèvres, École pratique des hautes études
- Occupations: Historian, Africanist
- Known for: Research on colonization, imperialism, and capitalism in Africa

Catherine Coquery-Vidrovitch (born 25 November 1935 in Paris) is a French historian and Africanist. She is professor emeritus at Paris Diderot University.

== Biography ==
She graduated from the École normale supérieure de Sèvres in 1959. She earned her third cycle doctorate from the École pratique des hautes études in 1966. She was a fellow at the Woodrow Wilson International Center for Scholars in Washington D.C. in 1987, at the Shelby Cullom Davis Center for Historical Studies at Princeton University in 1992, and at the Humanities Research Center, University of Canberra at the University of Canberra in 1995.

Her research deals with the political issues of colonization as well as the idea of imperialism and capitalism in Africa.
