= David Wiley =

David Wiley may refer to:

- David Wiley (mayor) (1768–1812), mayor of Georgetown, District of Columbia
- David A. Wiley, academic at Brigham Young University
- David S. Wiley (conductor) (born 1966), American conductor
- David S. Wiley (sociologist) (born 1935), professor of sociology at Michigan State University
- David Wiley (actor) (1928–2010), American actor
- David Wiley (Maryland politician) (died 1885), American politician

== See also ==
- David Willey (disambiguation)
