= National identity =

Identity or sense of belonging to one state or one nation

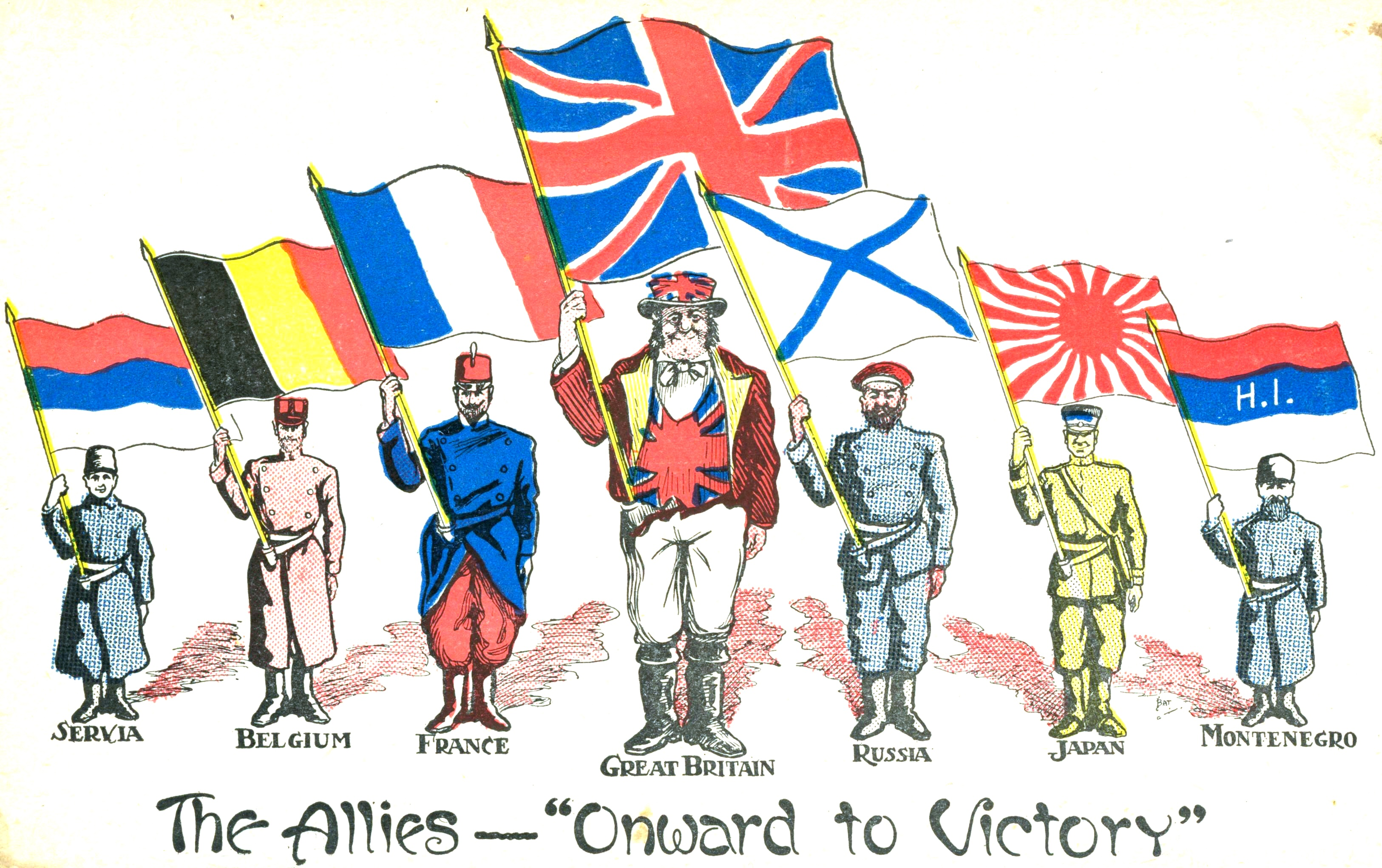
A postcard from 1916 showing national personifications of some of the Allies of World War I, each holding a flag representative of their nation

National identity is a person's identity or sense of belonging to one or more states or one or more nations. It is the sense of "a nation as a cohesive whole, as represented by distinctive traditions, culture, and language".

National identity comprises both political and cultural elements. As a collective phenomenon, it can arise from the presence of "common points" in people's daily lives: national symbols, language, the nation's history, national consciousness, and cultural artifacts. Subjectively, it is a feeling one shares with a group of people about a nation, regardless of one's legal citizenship status. In psychological terms, it is defined as an "awareness of difference", a "feeling and recognition of 'we' and 'they'". National identity can incorporate the population, as well as diaspora, of multi-ethnic states and societies that have a shared sense of common identity. Hyphenated ethnicities are examples of the confluence of multiple ethnic and national identities within a single person or entity.

Under international law, the term national identity, concerning states, is interchangeable with the term state's identity or sovereign identity of the state. A State's identity by definition, is related to the Constitutional name of the state used as a legal identification in international relations and an essential element of the state's international juridical personality. The sovereign identity of the nation also represents a common denominator for identification of the national culture or cultural identity, and under International Law, any external interference with the cultural identity or cultural beliefs and traditions appear to be inadmissible. Any deprivation or external modification of the cultural national identity violates basic collective human rights.

The expression of one's national identity seen in a positive light is patriotism characterized by national pride and the positive emotion of love for one's country. The extreme expression of national identity is chauvinism, which refers to the firm belief in the country's superiority and extreme loyalty toward one's country.

== Formation ==
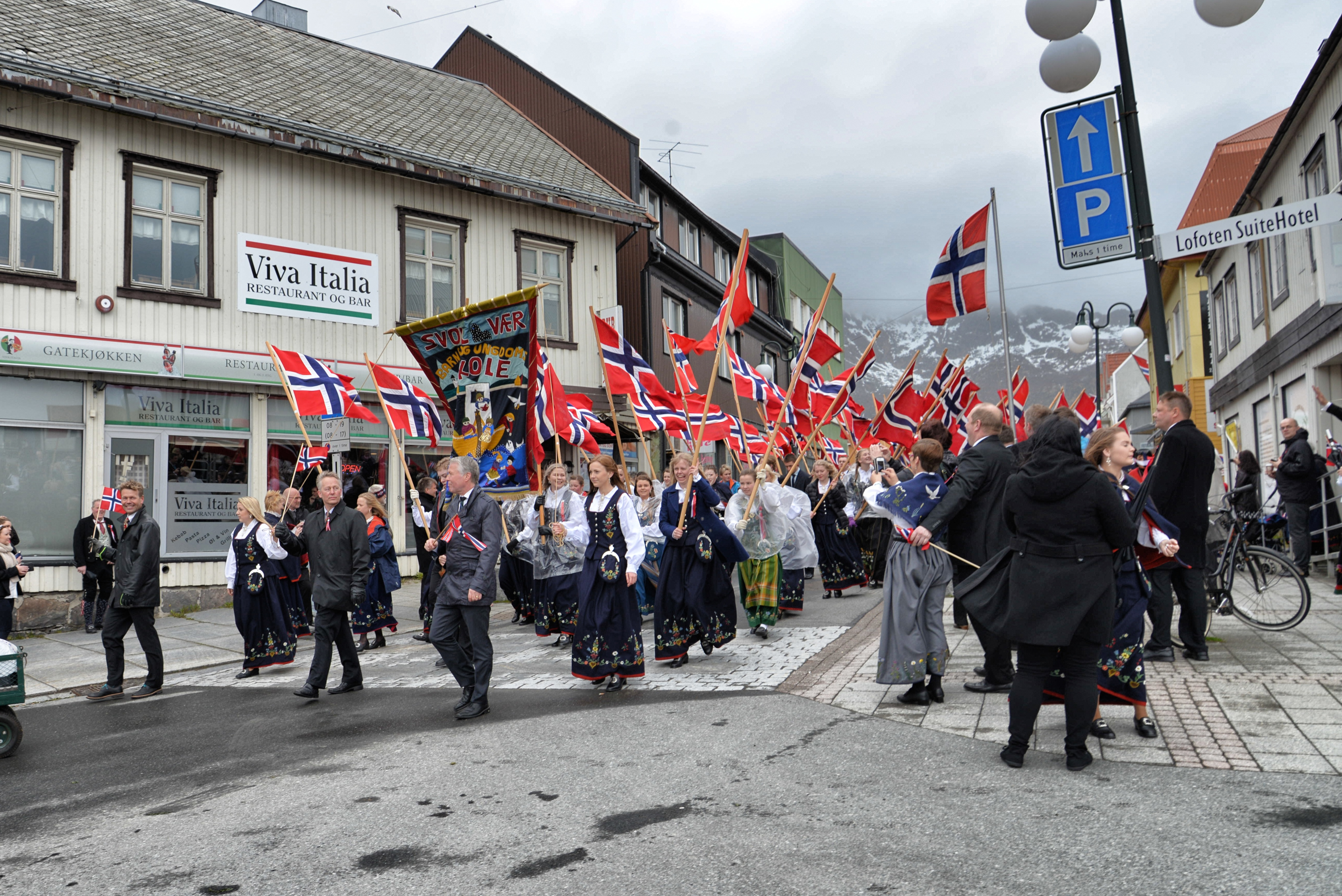
Norwegians celebrating national day

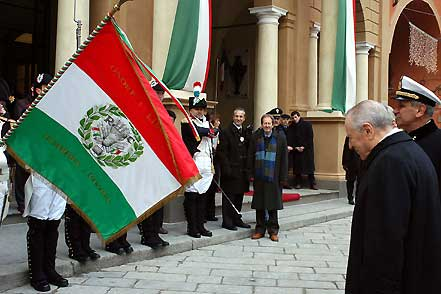
The then-president of Italy Carlo Azeglio Ciampi honors the flag of Cispadane Republic, the first Italian flag, during the Tricolour Day on 7 January 2004 in Reggio Emilia.

National identity is not an inborn trait; it is essentially a social construct. There is no agreed definition of what constitutes national identity. It can result from the presence of elements from the "common points" in people's daily lives: national symbols, languages, colors, national history, blood ties, culture, music, cuisine, radio, television, and so on. Under various social influences, people incorporate national identity into their identities by adopting beliefs, values, assumptions, and expectations which align with a national identity. People with identification with their nation view national beliefs and values as personally meaningful and translate them into daily practices.

Three main schools of defining national identity exist:

- Essentialists view national identity as fixed, based on ancestry, a common language history, ethnicity, and world views (Connor 1994; Huntington 1996).
- Constructivists believe in the importance of politics and the use of power by dominant groups to gain and maintain privileged status in society (Brubaker, 2009; Spillman, 1997; Wagner-Pacifici & Schwartz, 1991).
- Finally, the civic identity school focuses on shared values about rights and state institutions' legitimacy to govern.

A few scholars have investigated how popular culture connects with the identity-building process. Some found that contemporary music genres can strengthen ethnic identity by increasing the feeling of ethnic pride.

=== Conceptualization ===
Political scientist Rupert Emerson defined national identity as "a body of people who feel that they are a nation". This definition of national identity was endorsed by social psychologist, Henri Tajfel, who formulated social identity theory together with John Turner. Social identity theory adopts this definition of national identity and suggests that the conceptualization of national identity includes both self-categorization and affect. Self-categorization refers to identifying with a nation and viewing oneself as a member of a nation. The affect part refers to the emotion a person has with this identification, such as a sense of belonging or emotional attachment toward one's country. The mere awareness of belonging to a specific group invokes positive emotions about the group and leads to a tendency to act on behalf of that group, even when other group members are sometimes personally unknown.

National identity requires the process of self-categorization, and it involves both the identification of in-group (identifying with one's nation) and the differentiation of out-groups (other nations). People identify with a nation and form an in-group by recognizing commonalities such as having common descent and common destiny. At the same time they view people that identify with a different nation as out-groups. Social identity theory suggests a positive relationship between the identification of a nation and the derogation of other nations. People are involved in intergroup comparisons by identifying with their nation and tend to derogate out-groups. However, several studies have investigated this relationship between national identity and derogating other countries and found that identifying with national identity does not necessarily result in out-group derogation.

National identity, like other social identities, engenders emotions such as pride and love for one's national group and a feeling of obligation toward other members of that group. The socialization of national identity, such as socializing national pride and a sense of a country's exceptionalism, contributes to harmony among ethnic groups. For example, in the U.S., by integrating diverse ethnic groups in the overarching identity of being American, people are united by a shared emotion of national pride and the feeling of belonging to the U.S. and thus tend to mitigate ethnic conflicts.

=== Salience ===
National identity can be most noticeable when the nation confronts enemies (external or internal) or natural disasters. An example of this phenomenon is the rise in patriotism and national identity in the United States after the terrorist attacks on September 11, 2001. The identity of being an American became salient after the terrorist attacks and the evocation of American national identity. Having a common threat or a common goal can unite people in a nation and enhance national identity. (Note: A common threat may prove insufficient to encourage unity, as in the case of Viking or English moves to conquer the Irish.)

Sociologist Anthony Smith argues that national identity has the feature of continuity that can be transmitted and persisted through generations: national myths of having common descent and common destiny may enhance people's sense of belonging to a nation. However, national identities can disappear over time as (for example) when people live in foreign countries for a longer time, and can be challenged by supranational identities, which appeal to identification with a more inclusive, larger group that includes people from multiple nations. Dynasties (like the Habsburgs) and empires (like the Roman Republic and its successors) may exploit this appeal.

Research on study-abroad experiences that focused on the effects of American stereotypes found that American students faced challenges in connecting with their host country during their study-abroad experience because of stereotypes of American identity. A stereotype that affected their experience was related to politics during the 2016 United States presidential election of Donald Trump. A study found that students would disengage, distance, avoid, assimilate, or challenge their identity or host culture in response to the interactions they faced. Preconceived ideas within the host culture, and also amongst Americans, affect the ability of people from different backgrounds to understand and accept one another as individuals, rather than endorsing stereotypes of cultural groups.

=== People ===
The people are the basic concept for a national identity. But people can be identified and constructed through different logics of nationalism. Examples range from the Völkisch movement to people's republics.

== National consciousness ==
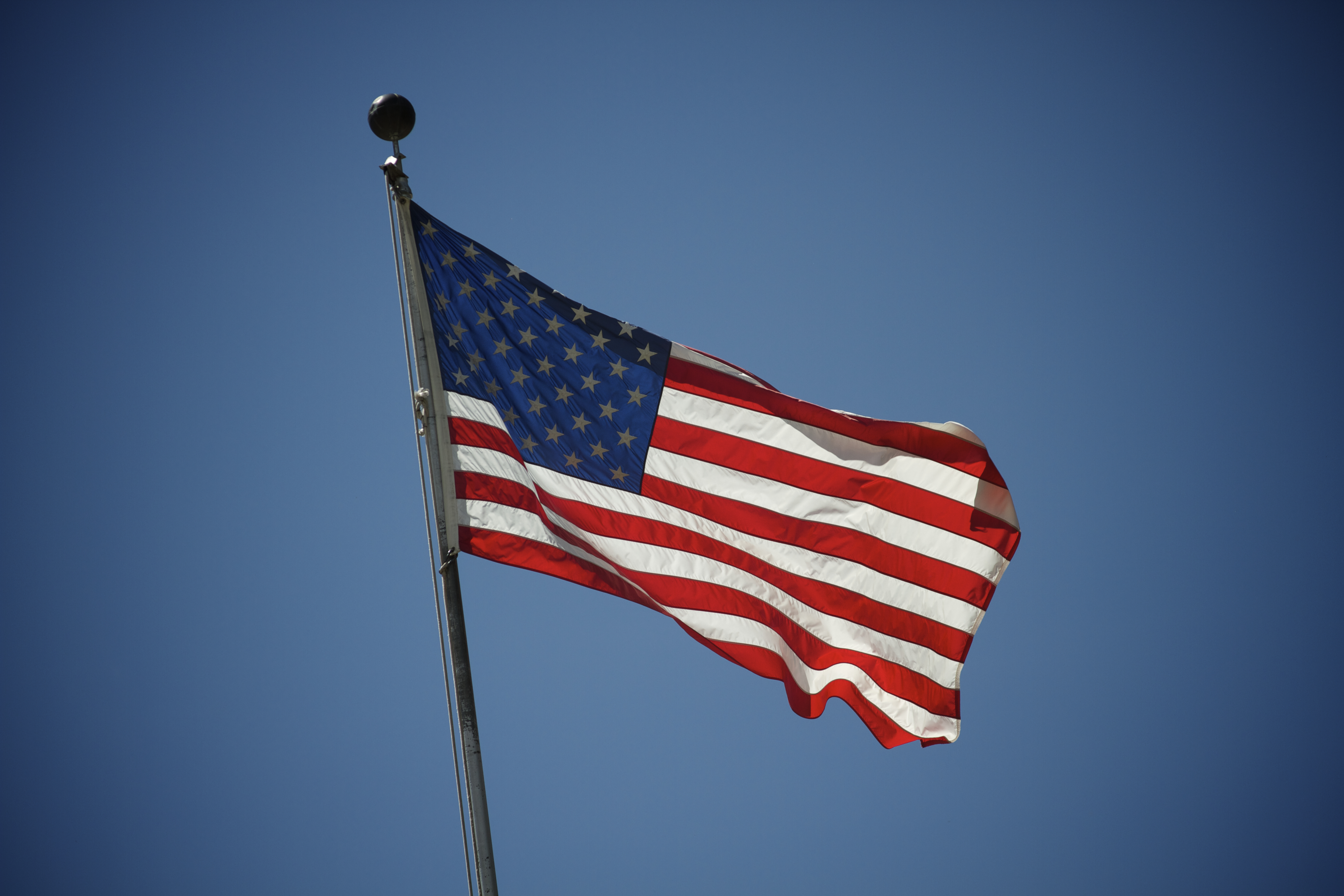
American flag as a national symbol

A national consciousness is a shared sense of national identity and a shared understanding that a people group shares a common ethnic/linguistic/cultural background. Historically, a rise in national consciousness has been the first step toward creating a nation. At a glance, national consciousness is one's level of awareness of the collective and one's understanding that without "them", there is no "us". It is the mere awareness of the many shared attitudes and beliefs towards things like family, customs, societal and gender roles, etc. The awareness allows one to have a "collective identity", which allows them to be knowledgeable of where they are and how those places and people around them are so significant that they ultimately make the collective a nation. In short, national consciousness can be defined as a specific core of attitudes that provide habitual modes for regarding life's phenomena.

National identities in Europe and the Americas developed along with the idea of political sovereignty invested in the people of the state. In Eastern Europe, it was also often linked to ethnicity and culture. Nationalism requires first a national consciousness, the awareness of the national communality of a group of people or nation. An awakening of national consciousness is frequently ascribed to national heroes and is associated with national symbols.

National identity can be considered a collective product. Through socialization, a system of beliefs, values, assumptions, and expectations are transmitted to group members. The collective elements of national identity may include national symbols, traditions, and memories of national experiences and achievements. These collective elements are rooted in the nation's history. Depending on how much the individual is exposed to the socialization of this system, people incorporate national identity into their identity to different degrees and in different ways, and the collective elements of national identity may become important parts of an individual's definition of the self and how they view the world and their place in it.

=== Perspectives ===
==== Benedict Anderson ====
Nations, to Benedict Anderson, are imagined. The idea of the "imagined community" is that a nation is socially constructed, and the nation is made up of individuals who see themselves as part of a particular group. Anderson referred to nations as "imagined communities". He thought that nations, or imagined communities, were delimited because of their boundaries regarding who is in and who is out. Anderson believed that the nation operates through exclusion. Though nations exclude those outside of it but also their members who are not immediately considered in the collective idea of their national identity. Anderson thought that nations were delimited and also were:

Limited: Because of the mental boundaries or concepts, we set about others are by culture, ethnicity, etc. We do not imagine everyone in one society or under one nationalism, but we are mentally separate.

Sovereign: Nations were sovereign because sovereignty symbolizes freedom from traditional religious practices. Sovereignty provides the organization needed for a nation while keeping it free of traditional religious pressures.

==== Ernest Gellner ====
Unlike Benedict Anderson, Gellner thought nations were not "imagined communities". In his book, Ernest Gellner explained how he thought nations originated. In his eyes, nations are entirely modern constructs and products of nationalism. Gellner believed nations to be a result of the Industrial Revolution. Since large numbers of people from different backgrounds were coming together in cities, a shared identity had to be made among them. The spread of capitalism brought the demand for constant retraining, and Gellner thought that as a result, the demand was met by creating a shared past, common culture, and language, which led to the birth of nations.

Gellner thought that nations were contingencies and not universal necessities. He said that our idea of the nation was as such.

Two men were only of the same only if they were from the same culture. In this case, culture is "a system of ideas, signs, associations, and ways of communicating."

Two men are of the same nation only if they recognize each other as being a part of the same nation.

It was men's recognition of each other as people of the same kind that made them a nation and not their common attributes.

==== Paul Gilbert ====
In "The Philosophy of Nationalism", Paul Gilbert breaks down what he thinks a nation is, and his ideas contrast those of both Anderson and Gellner. In the book, Gilbert acknowledges that nations are many things. Gilbert says nations are:

Nominalist: Whatever a group of people who consider themselves a nation say a nation is.

Voluntarist: "Group of people bound by a commonly willed nation."

Territorial: Group of people located in the same proximity, or territory.

Linguistic: People who share the same language.

Axiological: Group of people who have the same distinctive values.

Destination: Group of people who have a common history and a common mission.

== Challenges ==
=== Ethnic identity ===
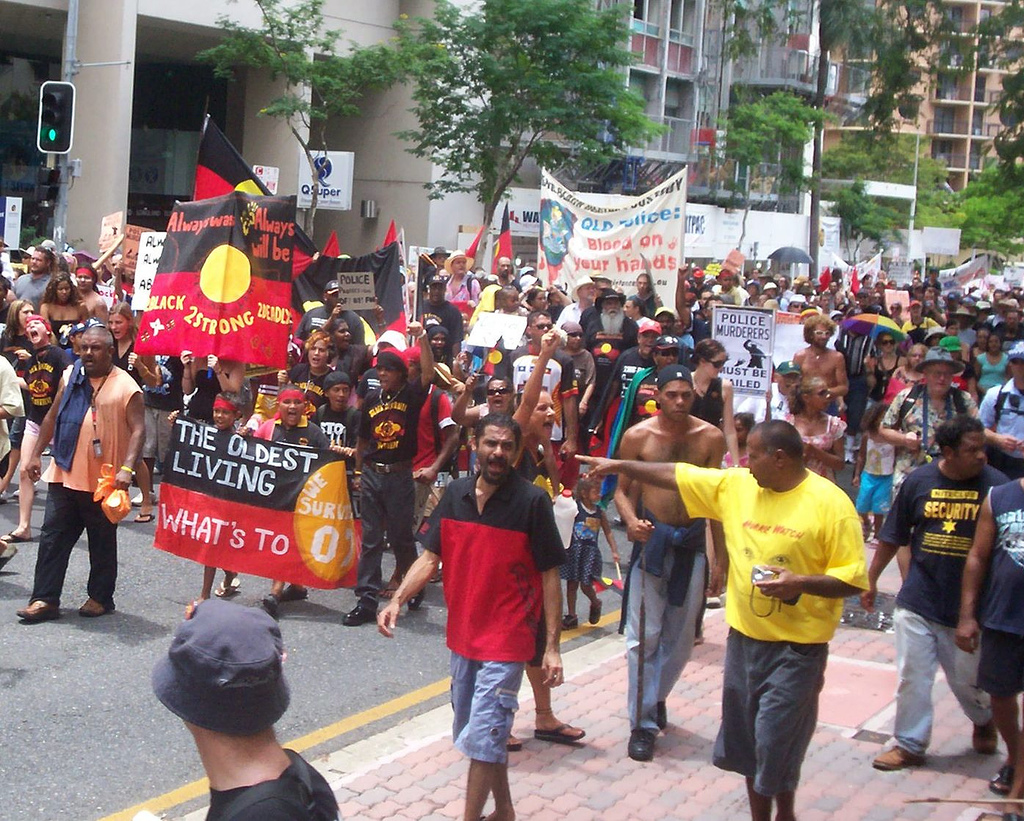
Aboriginal Australians protesting in Brisbane

In countries that have multiple ethnic groups, ethnic and national identity may be in conflict. These conflicts are usually referred to as ethnonational conflicts. One of the famous ethnonational conflicts is the struggle between the Australian government and aboriginal population in Australia. The Australian government and majority culture-imposed policies and framework that supported the majority, European-based cultural values, and a national language as English. The state did not support the Aboriginal cultures and languages, which were nearly eradicated by the state during the 20th century. Because of these conflicts, the Aboriginal population identifies less or does not identify with the national identity of being an Australian, but their ethnic identities are salient.

=== Immigration ===
As immigration increases, many countries face the challenges of constructing national identity and accommodating immigrants. Some countries are more inclusive in terms of encouraging immigrants to develop a sense of belonging to their host country. For example, Canada has the highest permanent immigration rates in the world. The Canadian government encourages immigrants to build a sense of belonging to Canada. It has fostered a more inclusive concept of national identity, which includes both people born in Canada and immigrants. Some countries are less inclusive. For example, Russia has experienced two major waves of immigration influx, one in the 1990s, and the other one after 1998. Immigrants were perceived negatively by the Russian people and were viewed as "unwelcome and abusive guests". Immigrants were considered outsiders and were excluded from sharing the national identity of belonging to Russia.

=== Globalization ===
As the world becomes increasingly globalized, international tourism, communication, and business collaboration have increased. People around the world cross national borders more frequently to seek cultural exchange, education, business, and different lifestyles. Globalization promotes common values and experiences and encourages identification with the global community. People may adapt cosmopolitanism and view themselves as global beings, or world citizens. This trend may threaten national identity because globalization undermines the importance of being a citizen of a particular country.

Several researchers examined globalization and its impact on national identity. They found that as a country becomes more globalized, patriotism declines, which suggests that the increase in globalization is associated with less loyalty and less willingness to fight for one's own country. However, even a nation like Turkey which occupies an important geographic trade crossroads and international marketplace with a tradition of liberal economic activity with an ingrained entrepreneurial and foreign trade has degrees of ethnocentrism as Turkish consumers may be basically rational buyers by not discriminating against imported products. Nevertheless, they exhibit preferences for local goods that are of equal quality to the imports because buying them assists the nation's economy and domestic employment.

== Issues ==
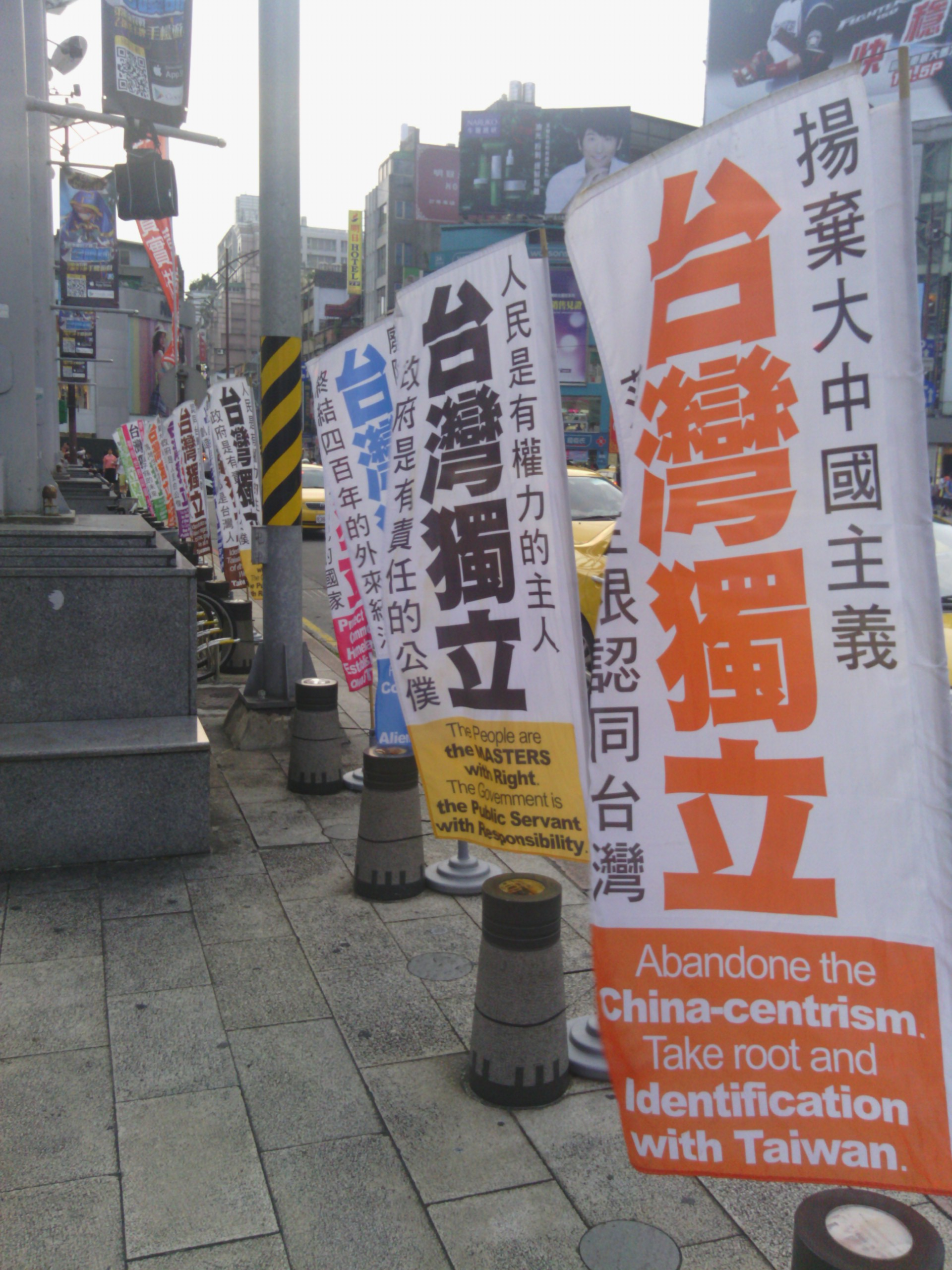
Taiwanese demonstrating in support of independence

In some cases, national identity collides with a person's civil identity. For example, many Israeli Arabs identify as Palestinians in Israel. At the same time, they are citizens of the state of Israel, which conflicts with the Palestinian nationality. Taiwanese also face a conflict of national identity with civil identity as there have been movements advocating formal "Taiwan Independence" and renaming "Republic of China" to "Republic of Taiwan". Residents in Taiwan are issued national identification cards and passports under the country name "Republic of China", and a portion of them do not identify themselves with "Republic of China", but rather with "Republic of Taiwan".

== Markers ==
National identity markers are those characteristics used to identify a person as possessing a particular national identity. These markers are not fixed but fluid, varying from culture to culture and also within a culture over time. Such markers may include common language or dialect, national dress, birthplace, family affiliation, etc.

== See also ==
- Cosmopolitanism
- Culture of the United States
- Ethnic group
- Ethnocentrism
- Gastronationalism
- Globalization
- Identity (social science)
- Indonesian National Awakening
- Identity crisis
- Nationalism
- Patriotism
- Social identity theory
- Global citizenship
- Volkstum
- Volksgeist

== Bibliography ==
- Huntington, Samuel P. (2004). Who are we? : the challenges to America's national identity. Simon & Schuster. ISBN 9780684870533.
- Janev, Igor (2021). Prespa Agreement and its Effects on Macedonian Right to National Identity. Lambert. ISBN 978-620-4-71741-8.
- Smith, Anthony D. (1993). National identity. University of Nevada Press. ISBN 9780874172041.
