= Boubacar Barry (disambiguation) =

Boubacar Barry (born 1979) is an Ivorian football coach and former goalkeeper.

Boubacar Barry may also refer to:

- Boubacar Barry (historian) (born 1943), Guinean-Senegalese university professor
- Boubacar Barry (footballer, born 1996), German football attacking midfielder
