= African Studies Center, Michigan State University =

Founded in 1960, the African Studies Center (ASC) at Michigan State University (MSU) is a major academic center for the study of Africa and one of 11 "Title VI National Resource Centers on Africa designated by the U.S. Department of Education. The Center’s strength is based on the more than 160 MSU faculty who provide research, teaching, and service on Africa. Center faculty have research, projects, and expertise in 32 African nations.

== African languages ==
MSU offers instruction in up to 32 African languages and teaches 9-12 languages each year and intensive African languages in the summer. The Center is home to the national e-LCTL Initiative, with a website that a) catalogs the 220+ "Less Commonly Taught Languages" (LCTLs) offered in the more than 120 Title VI National Resource Centers of Africa, Asia, Europe, Latin America, Middle East, and Canada, b) offers essays on priorities among LCTL languages for instruction in the U.S., and c) provides a database of "web objects" for teaching some LCTLs. See also the Center's Webbook of the African Languages, a directory of description, texts, and experts for 82 important African languages.

== Library ==
The MSU Africana Library collection is served by two PhD Africanist librarians, more than 237,000 items, and a large annual budget. The Library hosts the "African e-Journals Project," a directory of journals about Africa and full-text of 11 African journals online. It also houses the African Activist Archive, which preserves records and memories of activism in the U.S. to support the struggles of African peoples against colonialism, apartheid, and social injustice from the 1950s through the 1990s. The project holds the physical deposits at MSU of records of many activist organizations and individuals. The online African Activist Archive includes a directory of other archives and more than 7,000 historical materials, including pamphlets, documents, newsletters, leaflets, buttons, posters, T-shirts, photographs, audio and video recordings, and personal remembrances and interviews with activists.

== Research and service foci ==
In addition to African languages, social sciences, and arts and humanities, African Studies at MSU has been distinguished by its focus on Africa's human needs - poverty alleviation, food security, education for development, environment and development, tropical disease, ethics of development, and gender equity. For almost two decades, MSU graduate students have produced circa. 15 Ph.D. dissertations annually on Africa, especially in history, social sciences, economics and agricultural economics, and education. The African Studies Center offers the Title VI Foreign Language and Area Studies Fellowships for academic year and summer intensive study of African languages and area studies.

== Outreach and service ==
For more than 25 years, MSU's African Studies Outreach Program has provided professional assistance on Africa to K-12 schools, colleges and universities, communities, state and federal government, businesses, and journalists.

For schools and colleges, the program offers Exploring Africa (online gratis materials for teaching Africa K-12) and South Africa: Overcoming Apartheid, Building Democracy (an online curricular resource). The center's African Activist Archive is an online platform aimed preserving and making available online the records of activism in the United States to support the struggles of African peoples against colonialism, apartheid, and social injustice from the 1950s through the 1990s.

Databases from the ASC provide online information on Africa:

- African Media Program Database (Online database of 14,000+ films and videos on Africa)
- African Higher Education Resource Directory (online database of contact information on African universities, colleges, and their faculties created in partnership with the Association of African Universities/Association des Universités Africaines (Accra), the African Studies Association (U.S.))
- Afrobarometer (A collaboration with African social scientists to conduct surveys in 18 African countries on sociopolitical and economic attitudes in Africa, with data online)
- Food Security and Food Policy Information Portal for Africa (a project of UNECA and MSU Agricultural Economics)
- African Books Collective-Oxford (An MSU Press collaboration to distribute books of African authors and publishers in the U.S.)
- MSU Working Papers on Women and Gender in Africa (Working Papers on African Women of the MSU Women in International Development Program)

The Center offers a weekly Tuesday Bulletin with news of African events at MSU and of African conferences, colloquia, fellowships, and grant opportunities nationwide.

== Directors ==
- Jamie Monson, 2015–present
- Assefa Mehretu, 2014 (interim)
- James Pritchett, 2009-2013
- David S. Wiley, 1978-2008
- John M. Hunter, 1975- 1977
- Alfred Opubor, 1971-1974
- Victor N. Low, 1971 (acting)
