= CNRC =

CNRC may refer to:

- Cajal Neuroscience Research Center
- Cascadia Natural Resource Consultants
- Centre National du Registre du Commerce
- Children's Nutrition Research Center
- Clinical Nutrition Research Center
- Columbia Network Research Center
- Council of National Resource Centers, a group of U.S. universities which host National Resource Centers for international studies
- National Research Council of Canada (French acronym)
- Commander of the United States Navy Recruiting Command
