= Neo Lekgotla laga Ramoupi =

Prof. Neo Lekgotla laga Ramoupi
- Awards: ACLS African Humanities Program Fellowship (2016); Ford Foundation International Fellowship (2003–2006)

Academic background
- Education: Howard University
- Thesis: Songs of Cultural Resistance on Robben Island (2012)

Academic work
- Discipline: History of Africa; Public history
- Institutions: University of the Free State; University of the Witwatersrand
- Notable works: Robben Island Rainbow Dreams (HSRC Press, 2021)

Neo Lekgotla laga Ramoupi (also published as Neo Lekgotla Laga Ramoupi) is a South African historian and public historian. He is an associate professor in the Department of History at the University of the Free State and has held academic appointments at the University of the Witwatersrand. His scholarship focuses on African liberation history, cultural resistance (notably songs and music), and the decolonisation of history and university curricula.

== Career and appointments ==
Ramoupi earned a PhD in African history (with minors in public history and African studies) from Howard University and has held research and teaching posts in South Africa and abroad. He has been a senior lecturer in history at Wits University and an associate professor at the University of the Free State.

== Research and publications ==
Ramoupi’s research examines cultural practices and songs as forms of resistance during the anti-apartheid struggle, with a particular emphasis on Robben Island and the political prisoners’ cultural life. He is co-editor of the multi-author volume Robben Island Rainbow Dreams: The Making of Robben Island Museum, First Official Heritage Institution of Democratic South Africa (HSRC Press, 2021), a work that received scholarly review in the African Studies Review (Cambridge University Press).

He has published chapters and articles on the role of song in liberation movements, the Africanisation/decolonisation of curricula, and memory/heritage studies; several of his pieces have been used by scholars studying the cultural history of Robben Island.

== Fellowships and recognition ==
Ramoupi has been awarded competitive fellowships and grants, including a post-doctoral fellowship under the American Council of Learned Societies’ African Humanities Program (ACLS AHP, 2016) for a project on Robben Island culture and songs; he is also a former Ford Foundation International Fellow (2003–2006).

== Public engagement ==
Ramoupi has contributed commentary and articles to public platforms (including pieces republished via The Conversation and republished listings on Britannica as a contributor), and has presented invited lectures and seminars internationally on decolonisation, heritage, and the cultural history of resistance in South Africa.

== Selected works ==
- Robben Island Rainbow Dreams: The Making of Robben Island Museum, First Official Heritage Institution of Democratic South Africa (HSRC Press, 2021) — co-editor.
- Ramoupi, N. L. L., Noel Solani, André Odendaal & Khwezi ka Mpumlwana (eds.), Robben Island Rainbow Dreams: The Making of Democratic South Africa’s First National Heritage Institution. HSRC Press, 2021. ISBN 978-1-928246-29-9.
- Ramoupi, N. L. L., African Research and Scholarship: 20 Years of Lost Opportunities to Transform Higher Education in South Africa, 2014.
- Maluleka, P. & Ramoupi, N. L. L., “Towards a decolonized school history curriculum in post-apartheid South Africa through enacting Legitimation Code Theory”, in Decolonising Knowledge and Knowers (Routledge, 2022).
- Ramoupi, N. L. L., “Between Mandela and his LLB Degree”, (journal article — University of Johannesburg repository).
- Additional chapters and articles on heritage, songs of struggle and public history (selected in academic collections and journals).
- Cultural Resistance on Robben Island: Songs of Struggle and Liberation in South Africa” (chapter; forthcoming/archival listings of dissertation-based monograph).
