= Steven Howard =

Steven Howard may refer to:

- Steve Howard (politician), Canadian politician and Prince Edward Island Green MLA
- Steve Howard (born 1976), Scottish footballer
- Steve Howard (baseball) (born 1963), American Major League Baseball outfielder
- Steve Howard (sociologist) (born 1953), American sociologist
- Steven Howard (politician) (born 1971), American Democratic politician from Vermont

== See also ==
- Stephen Howard (disambiguation)
