= Association of Concerned Africa Scholars =

The Association of Concerned Africa Scholars (ACAS) is a US group of Africanist academics, founded in 1978, with co-chairs from the African Studies Association (ASA) and the African Heritage Studies Association (AHSA) for at least the first ten years.

It opposed the CIA's support for the Angolan Civil War and Ronald Reagan's policy towards Africa, in particular the policy of constructive engagement towards the South African regime. In the 1990s the Association led opposition to the Boren Bill.

The Association's papers are held at the African Activist Archive at Michigan State University.

== See also ==
- Committee of Concerned Asian Scholars
