= Beverly Grier =

American academic

Beverly Grier is an American academic in the study of child labor Sub-Saharan Africa, and former professor of government at Clark University. She is also the former president of the African Studies Association. She currently serves as Interim Associate Dean for Curriculum & Student Affairs at North Carolina A&T State University.

== Publications ==
Grier's most recent book is Invisible Hands: Child Labor and the State in Colonial Zimbabwe (Heinemann, 2005).

She has published many other articles and books on Africa, including "Women in West Africa" in the Women's Studies Encyclopedia, Making Sense of Our Differences: African American Women on Anita Hill, Wayne State University Press, Pawns, Porters and Petty Traders: Women in the Transition to Export Agriculture in Ghana, Westview Press, Politics in Niger, Oxford University Press, Contradiction, Crisis and Class Conflict: The State and Capitalist Development in Ghana Prior to 1948, Oxford University Press, "Underdevelopment, Modes of Production and the State in Colonial Ghana", African Studies Review, and "Cocoa Marketing in Colonial Ghana: Capitalist Enterprise and the Emergence of a Rural African Bourgeoisie", 1980–1981.
