= CIHA =

CIHA may refer to:

- Champion, Quebec, a re-broadcaster of CIHA-FM
- Chinese Ice Hockey Association
- Christmas Is Here Again
- Collegiate Ice Hockey Association
- Collegiate Inline Hockey Association, a former name of the National Collegiate Roller Hockey Association
- Comité International d'Histoire de l'Art
- Cook Islands Handball Association
- Critical Investigations into Humanitarianism in Africa, for which Benjamin Lawrance is an editor
