= St. Louis African Arts Festival =

Festival in the United States of America

The St. Louis African Arts Festival (also known as STLAAF or St. Louis African Arts Fair) is an annual arts and cultural festival in St. Louis, Missouri, which has been running since 1991. The STLAAF is a three-day event that takes place over the Memorial Day weekend. The African Arts Festival is a production of the St. Louis African Heritage Association, Inc. The St. Louis African Heritage Association, Inc. was established in 1995 and serves as the parent organization of the STLAAF and is a not-for-profit organization.

== History ==
The St. Louis African Arts Festival began in 1991 as an artistic and cultural arm of the African Studies Association's 34th Annual Conference hosted by Washington University in St. Louis. A variety of festival programs and activities were held throughout Greater St. Louis.

== Organization ==
The St. Louis African Arts Festival is headquartered at Washington University in St. Louis. Cynthia L. Cosby, Manager of Special Projects and Program Coordinator for the Black Alumni Council for Washington University in St. Louis, is the festival founder.
