= Peter Geschiere =

Dutch anthropologist

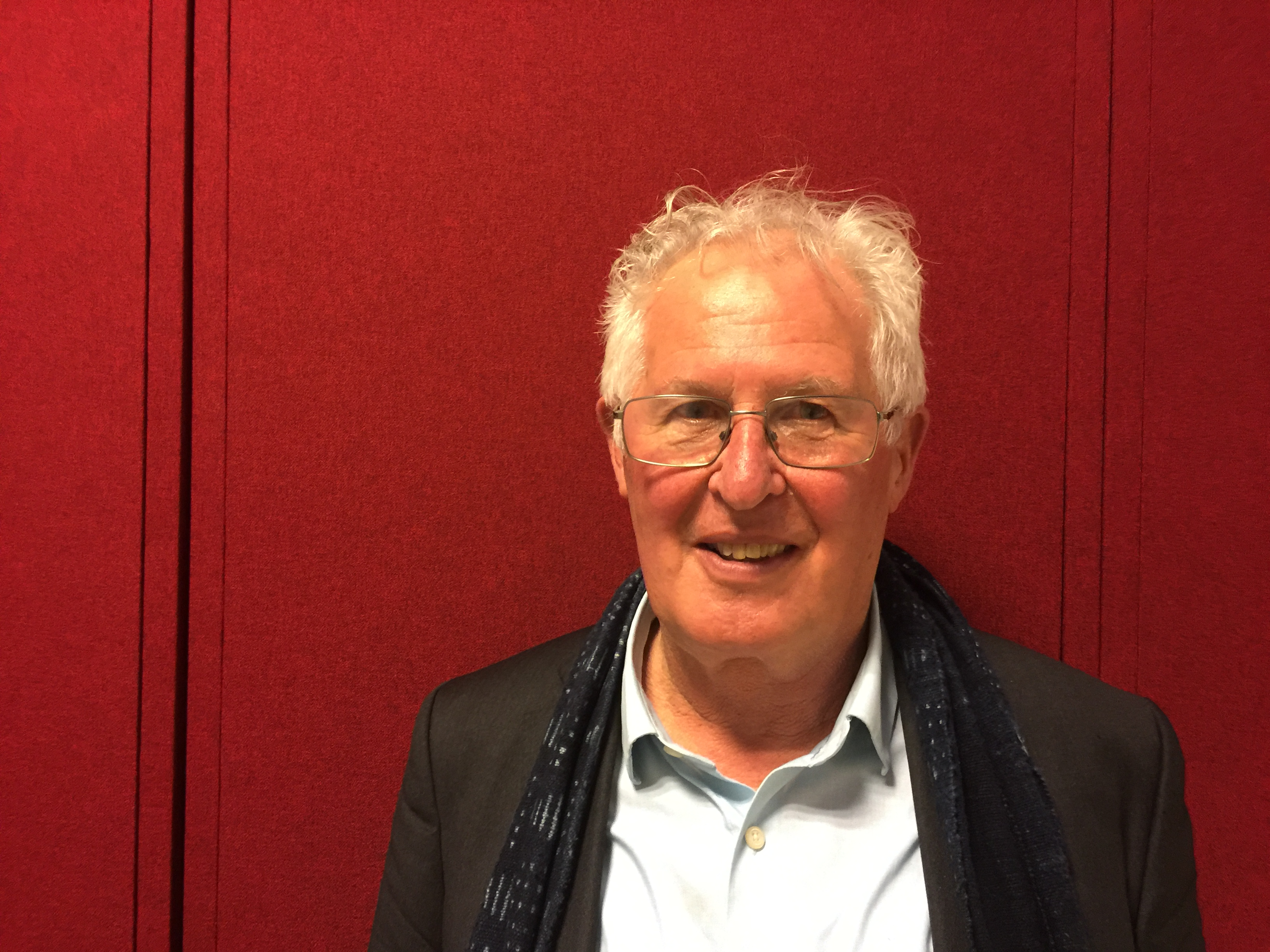
- Geschiere in 2019
- Born: 1941 (age 84–85)

Academic work
- Discipline: Anthropologist
- Sub-discipline: African Studies

Peter Lein Geschiere (born 1941) is a Dutch anthropologist, Africanist and Emeritus Professor of Anthropology at the University of Amsterdam. He studied at the Free University of Amsterdam obtaining a MA in history in 1967, a MA in anthropology in 1969, and a PhD in anthropology in 1978. Geschiere performed field work in Tunisia, Zaire, French- and English-speaking Cameroon and Senegal (1968-2001), and was a lecturer (1969-1978) and senior lecturer (1978-1988) at the Free University of Amsterdam. Then he held a professorship in Non-Western History at Erasmus University Rotterdam (1985-1988) and was a researcher at the African Studies Centre Leiden (1986-1988). At Leiden University Geschiere worked as Professor of Anthropology and Sociology of Sub-Saharan Africa (1988-2002). From 2000 onward he was Professor of Anthropology at the University of Amsterdam. Geschiere specialised on Cameroon and the comparative study of processes of change in Africa. In 2002 he won the Distinguished Africanist Award from the US-based African Studies Association.

== Publications ==
Geschiere published many scholarly books and articles, including

- Stamgemeenschappen onder Staatsgezag, Veranderende Verhoudingen in de Maka Dorpen (Z.O. Kameroen) sinds 1900, PhD thesis 1978 in Dutch. Amsterdam: Free University, 1978. Published in English as Village Communities and the State, Changing Relations among the Maka of Southeastern Cameroun since the Colonial Conquest, London/Boston: Kegan Paul International. Monographs African Studies Centre, 1982.
- with Wim van Binsbergen, eds.: Old Modes of Production and Capitalist Encroachment. Anthropological Explorations in Africa, London: Kegan Paul. Monographs from the African Studies Centre, 1985.
- The Modernity of Witchcraft, University of Virginia Press, 1997.
- with Birgit Meyer: Globalization and identity : dialectics of flow and closure, Blackwell Publishers, Oxford, UK, 1999.
- with Birgit Meyer and Peter Pels, eds.: Readings in Modernity in Africa - Readings in African Studies, Indiana University Press. ISBN 9780253351760, 2008.
- The Perils of Belonging: Autochthony, Citizenship and Exclusion in Africa and Europe, University of Chicago Press, 2009.
- with Patrick Awondo and Graeme Reid (Human Rights Watch): Homophobic Africa? – Towards a More Nuanced View, African Studies Review 55(2012), 145-168.
- Religion’s Others: Jean Comaroff on Religion and Society, Religion and Society, 3(2012), 17-25. Special issue on Jean Comaroff's anthropology of religion.
- Witchcraft, Intimacy and Trust – Africa in Comparison, University of Chicago Press, 2013.
