= Benjamin Lawrance =

Benjamin N. Lawrance (born 1973) is a legal historian who works on nineteenth- and twentieth-century Africa, with a particular focus on West Africa. Until 2017, he was the Hon. Barber B. Conable, Jr. Endowed Professor of International Studies in the Department of Sociology and Anthropology at the Rochester Institute of Technology. He works on comparative and contemporary slavery and trafficking, citizenship, human rights, and the law of asylum and refugees. He is currently Professor of African History at the University of Arizona.

Benjamin Lawrance currently serves as the Editor-in-Chief of the African Studies Review, the flagship journal of the African Studies Association.

== Life ==
Benjamin Lawrance was born in York, England, and emigrated to Australia as a child. He attended Barker College for high school. He returned to the U.K. for undergraduate and graduate education at University College London. He moved to the U.S.A. for graduate study in 1996 at Stanford University. After graduate school he taught at several institutions, including Stanford University, the University of San Francisco, California State University at San Bernardino, and the University of California, Davis.

He became the Hon. Barber B. Conable, Jr. Endowed Professor of International Studies at the Rochester Institute of Technology, a position which honors Barber Conable. Subsequently, he took a position at the University of Arizona.

He serves on the Advisory Board of PROTECT: the National Association for the Protection of Children.

== Works ==
Benjamin Lawrance's earlier work focused on the connection between twentieth-century Ewe identity creation and the creation of a specific periurban zone in southern Togo. Lawrance has also published several edited collections, including "Intermediaries, Interpreters, and Clerks: African Employees and the Making of Colonial Africa" (with Richard Roberts and Emily Osborn) and "Trafficking in Slavery's Wake: Law and the Experience of Women and Children in Africa" (with Richard Roberts).

- 2017. Citizenship in Question: Evidentiary Birthright and Statelessness (Durham: Duke University Press) with Jacqueline Stevens ISBN 9780822362913
- 2016. Marriage by Force? Contestation over Consent and Coercion in Africa (Athens, OH: Ohio University Press) with Anne Bunting and Richard L. Roberts ISBN 978-0821422007
- 2015. African Asylum at a Crossroads: Activism, Expert Testimony, and Refugee Rights (Athens, OH: Ohio University Press), with Iris Berger, Meredith Terretta, Jo Tague, and Trish Hepner Redeker.
- 2015. Adjudicating Refugee and Asylum Status: The Role of Witness, Expertise, and Testimony (New York: Cambridge University Press), with Galya Ruffer.
- 2014. Amistad's Orphans: An Atlantic Story of Children, Slavery, and Smuggling (New Haven, CT: Yale University Press)
- 2012. Trafficking in Slavery's Wake: Law and the Experience of Women and Children in Africa (Athens, OH: Ohio University Press, "New African Histories" Series), with Richard L. Roberts. ISBN 978-0-8214-2002-7
- 2012. Local Foods Meet Global Foodways: Tasting History (New York: Routledge/Taylor Francis), with Carolyn de la Peña 978-0415697750
- 2007. Locality, Mobility and ‘Nation’: Periurban Colonialism in Togo's Eweland, 1900-1960 (Rochester: University of Rochester Press). ISBN 978-1580462648
- 2006. Intermediaries, Interpreters and Clerks: African Employees and the Making of Colonial Africa (Madison: University of Wisconsin Press) with Emily L. Osborn and Richard L. Roberts [Reprinted 2013]. ISBN 978-0299219505
- 2005. The Ewe of Togo and Benin, Volume III in the "Handbook of Eweland" series (Accra, Ghana: Woeli Publishing Service) ISBN 978-9988626549

== Interests ==
With Jacqueline Stevens, Lawrance is currently exploring the experiences of individuals who cannot prove their citizenship or identity.

Lawrance has been an expert in different national jurisdictions, including the U.S., Canada, the Netherlands, the U.K, Israel, Hong Kong, and South Korea, and his opinions have featured in several appellate rulings in the U.S. and rulings from the Queen's Bench in the U.K.
