= Economy of affection =

The economy of affection is a term introduced by Göran Hydén to describe a network of interactions, communications and support among certain peasant groups in parts of East Africa. These groups, identified in terms of their relationship to structure, are united by kinship, community, religion or other affinities. The functional purposes of this economy of affection involves survival, social maintenance, and development.

The kind of personal relationships and dependencies which form the basis for a subsistence economy in East Africa have been superseded by commercial or government services in the developed world. But in such sub-Saharan African villages, as studied by Hydén, their economies have not yet been 'captured' by capitalism and their peasantry remains unproletarianised. The key issue here for Hydén is that the "social values" of the market are still underdeveloped. The East African peasantry still is able to 'choose' to operate at least partially in the traditional morality-based economy and the true market system. This then explains why a rational response to market incentives might strengthen his position in the economy of affection.

Tony Waters believes that Hydén's model of the uncaptured peasantry can be used to describe other peasant situations such as North America's European frontier in the early 19th century, and Scotland in the 18th and 19th centuries. The concept was popularised at China Agricultural University by Evans Tekuro Muki, Deborah Nakirijja, Victoria Harding, Tymon Mphaka and Lesego Khunuou
