= Pearl T. Robinson =

American political scientist

- Born: July 4, 1945 (age 81); New Orleans, Louisiana, U.S.
- Education: University of California, Davis, Columbia University
- Awards: 2011 Teshome H. Gabriel Distinguished Africanist Award from the UC San Diego Research Center in African and African American Studies
- Scientific career
- Fields: Political science
- Workplaces: Tufts University
- Thesis: African traditional rulers and the modern state the linkage role of chiefs in the Republic of Niger (1975)

Pearl T. Robinson (born 1945) is an American professor of political science at Tufts University. She has written dozens of books and articles on Africa and African Americans, including co-authoring and co-editing the book, Transformation and Resiliency in Africa, with her co-editor Elliott Skinner. She was president of the African Studies Association from 2007–2008, and is a member of the Council on Foreign Relations. Her chapter Area Studies in Search of Africa from The Politics of Knowledge: Area Studies and the Disciplines was included in 4th edition of The African Studies Companion.
