= David Willey =

David Willey may refer to:

- David Willey (cricketer) (born 1990), English cricketer
- David Willey (journalist) (1932–2026), British reporter for the BBC
- David Willey (physicist) (born 1947), English physicist and entertainer

== See also ==
- David Wiley (disambiguation)
