= Ana Lucia Araujo =

American, author and history professor

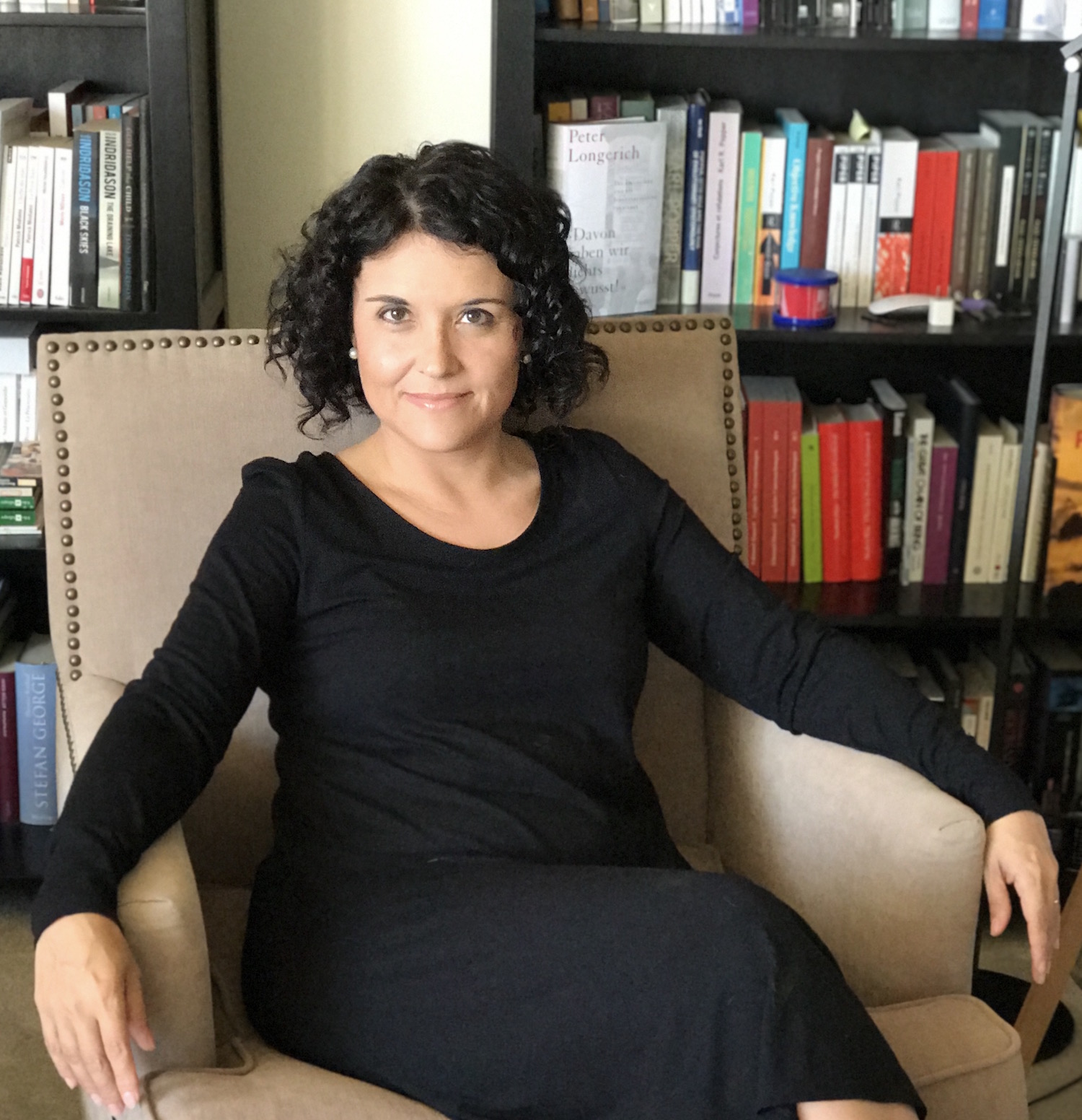
- Born: Ana Lucia Araujo; May 7, 1971 (age 55); Santa Maria, Rio Grande do Sul, Brazil
- Education: Université Laval (Ph.D. in History); École des Hautes Études en Sciences Sociales
- Occupations: Historian, professor, author
- Website: www.analuciaaraujo.org

Ana Lucia Araujo (May, 7, 1971) is an American historian, art historian, author, and professor of history at Howard University. She is a member of the International Scientific Committee of the UNESCO Slave Route Project. Her scholarship focuses on the transnational history, public memory, visual culture, and heritage of slavery and the Atlantic slave trade.

== Early life ==
Araujo was born and raised in Brazil. She earned her undergraduate degree in Fine Arts from Universidade Federal do Rio Grande do Sul (UFRGS), Porto Alegre, Brazil (1995), and a MA in history from Pontifícia Universidade Católica do Rio Grande do Sul (PUCRS), Porto Alegre, Brazil (1998). She moved to Canada in 1999 and obtained a PhD in Art History from Université Laval (Québec City, Canada) in 2004. Her main advisor was David Karel (1944-2007). In 2007 she also earned in cotutelle a PhD in history (Université Laval) and a doctorate in Social and Historical Anthropology from École des Hautes Études en Sciences Sociales (Paris, France). Her advisors were Africanist historian Bogumil Jewsiewicki and Africanist anthropologist Jean-Paul Colleyn.

== Career ==
Araujo received a postdoctoral fellowship from FQRSC (Fonds québécois de la recherche sur la société et la culture) in 2008, for the project titled: "Right to Image: Restitution of Cultural Heritage and Construction of the Memory of the Heirs of Slavery" but moved to Washington DC to take a tenure-track position of assistant professor in the Department of History at Howard University. She was tenured and promoted to associate professor in 2011, and became a full professor in 2014. She lectures throughout the United States, Canada, Brazil, Portugal, South Africa, France, United Kingdom, Netherlands, and Argentina, in English, French, Portuguese, and Spanish.

== Honors and awards ==
- 2025-26 The Clark Institute Fellowship, The Clark Institute
- 2025 John Solomon Guggenheim Fellowship
- 2025 Heinz Heinen Fellowship, Bonn Center for Dependency and Slavery Studies, Universität Bonn
- 2024 American Council of Learned Societies HBCU fellowship
- 2023 Great Immigrants Award Honoree, Carnegie Corporation of New York
- 2022-23 Getty Research Institute Senior Scholar, Los Angeles, CA
- 2022 Member of the School of Historical Studies, Institute for Advanced Study, Princeton, NJ
- 2021 Fellow of the Royal Historical Society, London, UK
- 2021 American Philosophical Society Franklin Research Grant
- 2017–present Member of the International Scientific Committee of the UNESCO Slave Route Project
- 2025 Guggenheim Fellowship

== Research ==
Araujo's work explores the public memory of slavery in the Atlantic world. Araujo's first book published in French, Romantisme tropical: l'aventure d'un peintre français au Brésil, examines how French travelogues, especially the travel account of French artist François-Auguste Biard (1799-1882), Deux années au Brésil, contributed to constructing a particular image of Brazil in Europe. In 2015, the University of New Mexico Press published a revised, translated version of this book as Brazil Through French Eyes: A Nineteenth-Century Artist in the Tropics.

Araujo has written many books and articles on history and memory of slavery, including Public Memory of Slavery: Victims and Perpetrators in the Atlantic World (2010), Shadows of the Slave Past: Memory, Slavery, and Heritage (2014), Reparations for Slavery and the Slave Trade: A Transnational and Comparative History (2017), Slavery in the Age of Memory: Engaging the Past (2020), and Museums and Atlantic Slavery (2021).

Public Memory of Slavery, Araujo's first book in English, studies the historical connections between Bahia in Brazil and the Kingdom of Dahomey in the modern Benin, during the era of the Atlantic slave trade, and how in these two areas social actors are engaging in remembering and commemorating the slave past to forge particular identities through the construction of monuments, memorials, and museums. Echoing her research in Dahomey and the Atlantic slave trade, her comments on the movie The Woman King were featured in Slate and the Washington Post. Araujo underscored that the movie misrepresented King Gezo (1818–1859) as attempting to end Dahomey's slave trade.

In her second book, Shadows of the Slave Past (2014), Araujo continued to focus on the processes of memorialization of slavery and the Atlantic slave trade in the Americas, with a particular emphasis on Brazil and the United States, by focusing on the sites of embarkation in Africa such as the House of Slaves in Gorée Island, and ports of disembarkation in the Americas such as Salvador and Rio de Janeiro in Brazil, as well as Charleston and New York City in the United States, plantation heritage sites, the commemoration of the great emancipators Lincoln (United States) and Princess Isabel (Brazil), and the commemoration of slave rebels such as Zumbi, Chirino, and others in the Americas.

Her book Reparations for Slavery and the Slave Trade: A Transnational and Comparative History (2017) is a comprehensive history of the demands of financial and material reparations for slavery and the slave trade in the Atlantic world. The book emphasizes the long history of demands of reparations for slavery from the period of slavery to the present, by exploring these demands in countries such as the United States, Brazil, Cuba, and the Caribbean. By surveying the work of several activists and organizations such as Belinda Sutton, Queen Audley Moore, James Forman and the Black Manifesto, the Republic of New Africa and the rise of the Caribbean Ten Point Plan, Araujo insists on the central role of Black women in formulating demands of financial and material reparations for slavery.

In Slavery in the Age of Memory: Engaging the Past (2020) she discusses the controversy regarding the construction and removal of monuments commemorating slave owners and slave traders, and how slavery is represented in George Washington's Mount Vernon and Thomas Jefferson's Monticello. Araujo often intervenes in the public debates discussing the removal of Confederate monuments in the United States, by arguing that their removal is not about erasing history, but about battles of public memory. She has also emphasized that the removal of monuments related to slavery is a global trend. Her work has addressed the removal of monuments and memorials during the worldwide protests which erupted after the murder of George Floyd on May 27, 2020.

Her most recent book explores the role of gifts in the Atlantic slave trade, by following the trajectory of a precious silver ceremonial sword fabricated in the French port of La Rochelle to be offered as a gift to an African slave trader in the West Central African port of Cabinda (in today's Angola) in the late eighteenth century, and one century later was mysteriously looted from Abomey, the capital of the Kingdom of Dahomey (in today's Republic of Benin) by the French army hundreds of miles away.

A public scholar, Araujo's work has been featured in the New York Times, the Washington Post, Le Monde, Radio Canada, Radio France, National Geographic,O Público, and other media outlets around the world. Her op-eds have also appeared in the Washington Post, History News Network, Newsweek, Slate, and Intercept Brasil.

== Bibliography ==
=== Books ===
- Réparations: Combats pour la mémoire de l'esclavage (XVIIIe-XXIe siècle). Paris: Seuil, 2025. ISBN 978-2021591637.
- Humans in Shackles: An Atlantic History of Slavery in the Americas. Chicago: University of Chicago Press, 2024. 677 p. ISBN 9780226771588.
- Esclavages: Représentations et cultures matérielles.. co-edited with Myriam Cottias and Klara Boyer-Rossol. Paris: Éditions du CNRS. ISBN 9782271151162.
- The Gift: How Objects of Prestige Shaped the Atlantic Slave Trade and Colonialism. Cambridge: Cambridge University Press, 2024. 230 p. ISBN 1108839290.
- Reparations for Slavery: A Transnational and Comparative History. London: Bloomsbury, 2023. 2nd edition. 360 p. ISBN 1350297666.
- Museums and Atlantic Slavery. Oxon and New York: Routledge, 2021. 132 p. ISBN 9780367530082.
- Slavery in the Age of Memory: Engaging the Past. London and New York: Bloomsbury, 2020. 272 p. ISBN 978-1350010604.
- Reparations for Slavery and the Slave Trade: A Transnational and Comparative History. London and New York: Bloomsbury, 2017. 288 p. ISBN 978-1350010604.
- Romantisme tropical: l'aventure illustrée d'un peintre français au Brésil. Quebec: Presses de l'Université Laval, 2008. 282 p. ISBN 2763786022.
  - English translation: Brazil through the French Eyes: A Nineteenth-Century Artist in the Tropics. Albuquerque: University of New Mexico Press, 2015. 264 p. ISBN 0826337457.
  - Portuguese: Romantismo tropical: Um pintor francês nos trópicos. São Paulo: Editora da Universidade de São Paulo, 2017. 248 p. ISBN 85-314-1647-7
- African Heritage and Memories of Slavery in Brazil and the South Atlantic World. Amherst, NY: Cambria Press, 2015. 428 p. ISBN 1604978929.
- Shadows of the Slave Past: Memory, Heritage, and Slavery. New York: Routledge, 2014. 268 p. ISBN 0415853923.
- Politics of Memory: Making Slavery Visible in the Public Space. New York: Routledge, 2012. 296 p. ISBN 0415526922
- Paths of the Atlantic Slave Trade: Interactions, Identities and Images. Amherst, NY: Cambria Press, 2011. 476 p. ISBN 1604977477
- Crossing Memories: Slavery and African Diaspora. Coedited with Mariana P. Candido, and Paul E. Lovejoy. Trenton, NJ: Africa World Press, 2011. 308 p. ISBN 1592218202.
- Public Memory of Slavery: Victims and Perpetrators in the South Atlantic. Amherst, NY: Cambria Press, 2010. 502 p. ISBN 1604977140.
- Living History: Encountering the Memory of the Heirs of Slavery. Newcastle, UK: Cambridge Scholars Publishing, 2009. 290 p. ISBN 1443809985
