= Stephen Howard =

Stephen Howard may refer to:

- Stephen Howard (basketball) (born 1970), US athlete in professional basketball
- Stephen Howard (cricketer) (born 1949), Australian athlete in cricket
- Stephen Howard (rugby league) (born 1987), American rugby league player
- Stephen Howard (politician) (1867–1934), English politician
- Stephen Gerald Howard (1896–1973), British farmer, barrister, judge and politician

== See also ==
- Steven Howard (disambiguation)
