= Iris Berger =

American historian

- Born: 12 October 1941; Chicago, Illinois
- Education: Evanston Township High School; University of Michigan (B.A.); University of Wisconsin–Madison (M.A., Ph.D)
- Occupation: Historian
- Spouse: Ronald Berger

Iris Berger, née Brown (born 12 October 1941), is an American historian of Africa.

== Life and work ==
Iris Brown Berger was born on 12 October 1941 in Chicago, Illinois. She attended Evanston Township High School and then received a B.A. with distinction from the University of Michigan in 1963. Berger is married to historian Ronald Berger and they have two daughters together. She attended graduate school at the University of Wisconsin–Madison where she was awarded a M.A. in African history in 1967 and a Ph.D. in 1973. Berger began teaching in Kenya at the Kaaga Elementary School, the Kenya-Israel School of Social Work, and the Machakos Girls' High School. When she returned to the United States she was appointed as an assistant professor at Wellesley College. Berger became a visiting assistant professor at the State University of New York at Albany in 1981, assistant professor three years later, associate professor in 1989 and full professor four years after that. She was director of women's studies from 1981 to 1984 and developed an M.A. Certificate in Women and Public Policy. She then was appointed as the director of the Institute for Research on Women from 1991 to 1995. Berger was elected president of the African Studies Association for 1995–96 and has published three books on African social, gender and class history as of 1996.
