= Bogumil Jewsiewicki =

Historian and university professor

- Born: 1942 (age 83–84); Vilnius, Reichskommissariat Ostland (modern-day Lithuania)
- Awards: Distinguished Africanist Award

Academic background
- Education: University of Łódź

Academic work
- Discipline: African history
- Institutions: Université Laval
- Main interests: Memory studies

Bogumil (Bogumił) Jewsiewicki Koss (born 1942 in Vilnius) is a Polish-Canadian historian and an Africanist specialising in the history of Central Africa, notably the Democratic Republic of the Congo, and the social usage of visual memory.

Jewsiewicki obtained a Master's degree in ethnography in 1964 and a PhD in 1968, both at the University of Łódź in Poland. From 1968 through 1974 Jewsiewicki taught at Institut supérieur pédagogique de Bukavu, Université Lovanium of Kinshasa and Université Nationale du Zaïre in the Democratic Republic of the Congo, later Zaire. He then emigrated to Canada to work at Université de Saint-Boniface in Winnipeg and in the Département d’histoire of Université Laval since 1977, becoming a full professor in the comparative history of memory (French: histoire comparée de la mémoire) in 1985.

Jewsiewicki was a researcher at the Centre d'études africaines of the School for Advanced Studies in the Social Sciences in Paris, and curated exhibitions on Congolese popular urban painting and on photography at the Museum for African Art in New York (1998-1999) and at the Museum für Völkerkunde in Vienna. He not only held exhbitions in the United States, but he also held them in other continents such as Africa and Europe. In 2009, he retired from his teaching post and continued as a researcher and member of the CÉLAT (French: Centre interuniversitaire de recherche sur les lettres, les arts et les traditions) at Université Laval. Jewsiewicki was the recipient of the 2006 Distinguished Africanist Award of the African Studies Association, and in 2007 he won Marius Barbeau Medal from the Association canadienne d'ethnologie et de folklore (Folklore Studies Association of Canada, ACEF FSAC). Jewsiewicki's collection of popular Congolese paintings was acquired by the Royal Museum for Central Africa at Tervuren, Belgium.

A festschrift was published in Jewsiewicki's honour in 2009 entitled Images, mémoires et savoirs. Une histoire en partage avec Bogumil Koss Jewsiewicki with Karthala, edited by Isidore Ndaywel è Nziem and Mudimbe-Boyi.

== Publications ==
Jewsiewicki published many scholarly articles, books and book chapters, including:

- Marx, Afrique et Occident : les pratiques africanistes de l'histoire marxiste, Centre for Developing-Area Studies, McGill University, [Montréal], 1985. ISBN 9780888190642.
- with David S. Newbury: African historiographies : what history for which Africa?, SAGE Publications, Beverly Hills, 1986. Series: Sage series on African modernization and development.
- Art pictural zaïrois. Sillery, Quebec City: Septentrion en collab. avec le CÉLAT (Centre interuniversitaire de recherche sur les lettres, les arts et les traditions), 1992. ISBN 9782921114684.
- with V. Y. Mudimbe: Africans' Memories and Contemporary History of Africa, History and Theory 32(1993), Beiheft 32: History Making in Africa. pp. 1–11
- with Elikia M'Bokolo, Ndaywel è Nziem and Sabakinu Kivilu: Naître et mourir au Zaïre : un demi-siècle d'histoire au quotidien, Paris : Éditions Karthala, 1993. ISBN 9782865373901.
- with Jocelyn Létourneau: L'histoire en partage : usages et mises en discours du passé. Paris : L'Harmattan, 1996. ISBN 9782738444660.
- with Jocelyn Létourneau: Identités en mutation, socialités en germination, Septentrion, Sillery, Québec, 1998. Series: Nouveaux cahiers du CELAT.
- Mami Wata : ma peinture urbaine au Congo. Paris : Ed. Gallimard, 2003. ISBN 9782070739134.
- with Léonard N'Sanda Buleli: Les identités régionales en Afrique centrale : constructions et dérives, Paris : L'Harmattan, 2008. ISBN 9782296053151.
- Introduction. One Historiography or Several? A Requiem for Africanism, in: I. Ndaywel è Nziem, M. Elisabeth Mudimbe-boyi, Pierre Nora (Eds.): Images, mémoires et savoirs : une histoire en partage avec Bogumil Koss Jewsiewicki, Karthala, Paris, 2009. Series: Hommes et sociétés. ISBN 9782811102081, 2811102086.
- In the empire of forgetting : collective memory of the slave trade and slavery, in: Ana Lucia Araujo, Mariana P. Candido, Paul E. Lovejoy (Eds.): Crossing Memories: Slavery and African Diaspora, Africa World Press, Trenton, NJ, 2011.
- with Freddy Tsimba, Koli Jean Bofane, Pascal Blanchard, and Henry Bundjoko: Freddy Tsimba - Mabele eleki lola! : de aarde, stralender dan het paradijs, Musée Royal de l'Afrique Centrale. Exhibition catalogue Africamuseum, Tervuren, Belgium. Kate' art édition, Brussel, 2020.

Books honouring Jewsiewicki's work are:

- I. Ndaywel è Nziem, M. Elisabeth Mudimbe-boyi, Pierre Nora (Eds.): Images, mémoires et savoirs : une histoire en partage avec Bogumil Koss Jewsiewicki, Karthala, Paris, 2009. Series: Hommes et sociétés. ISBN 9782811102081, 2811102086.
- Ana Lucia Araujo, Mariana P. Candido, Paul E. Lovejoy (Eds.): Crossing Memories: Slavery and African Diaspora, Africa World Press, Trenton, NJ, 2011. Series: Harriet Tubman series on the African diaspora. Papers presented at a conference held in Quebec City in 2005.

== Bibliography ==
- Kończal, Kornelia (2014), Porównawcza historia pamięci. Rozmowa z profesorem Bogumiłem Jewsiewickim, Kultura Współczesna, 4, p. 148–161.
