= Edmond Keller =

American africanist

Edmond Joseph Keller, Jr. (born August 22, 1942) is an American Africanist.

A graduate of Louisiana State University and the University of Wisconsin–Madison, Keller is a professor in the political science department at UCLA. He is the former Director of the Globalization Research Center-Africa and the James S. Coleman African Studies Center at UCLA. He has taught at Indiana University, Dartmouth College, the University of Wisconsin-Madison, Xavier University (New Orleans), and the University of California-Santa Barbara.

Keller is the author of two monographs: Education, Manpower and Development: The Impact of Educational Policy in Kenya (1980) and Revolutionary Ethiopia: From Empire to People's Republic (1988). Professor Keller has also written more than 50 articles on African and African-American politics, and has co-edited seven books: Afro-Marxist Regimes: Ideology and Public Policy (with Donald Rothchild, 1987); South Africa in Southern Africa: Domestic Change and International Conflict (with Louis Picard, 1989), Africa in the New International Order: Rethinking State Sovereignty and Regional Security (with Donald Rothchild, 1996) and Africa-US Relations: Strategic Encounters (with Donald Rothchild, 2006). His most recent publications are HIV/AIDS in Africa: Challenges and Impact, co-edited with Edith Omwami and Stephen Commins (2008); Trustee for the Human Community: Ralph J. Bunche, the United Nations, and the Decolonization of Africa, edited with Robert Hill (2010); and Religion, Institutions and the Transition to Democracy in Africa, edited with Dr. Ruth Iyob (2012). Keller's main research is on issues of political transitions in Africa, cultural pluralism and nationalism, conflict and conflict management in Africa.

In 2008, Keller was awarded the "Distinguished Africanist Award" by the African Studies Association.
