= Steve Howard (sociologist) =

American sociologist (born 1953)

William Stephen Howard
- Born: William Stephen Howard; March 21, 1953; Boston, Massachusetts, U.S.
- Education: Georgetown University; Michigan State University
- Scientific career
- Fields: Sociology
- Workplaces: Ohio University

William Stephen Howard (born March 21, 1953) is an American sociologist. His studies and work focus upon social change in Africa and social movements within the Muslim world. He has written about his experiences with the Muslim community in Sudan. Howard is a professor and an associate director of graduate studies at Ohio University. He works within the School for Media Arts and Studies in the Scripps College of Communications.

== Early life ==
Steve Howard was born on March 21, 1953, to parents William S. and Elizabeth Howard in Boston, Massachusetts. He began his career in education studying International Relations at Georgetown University in Washington DC. During his senior year he was invited to join the Peace Corps and, after graduating, traveled to Chad. After working in high schools in rural Chad, he returned to the United States and pursued graduate studies at Michigan State University. He graduated with a master's degree and PhD in Sociology and African Studies. He conducted his PhD research in Sudan, where he wrote about the Republican Brotherhood. His dissertation was "Social Strategies in Petty Production: Three Small Scale Industries in Urban Sudan") He was awarded a Fulbright Scholarship.

== Career ==
Following his graduation from Michigan State University, Steve Howard left for Sudan in 1982. There, he joined the Republican Brotherhood, a group of men and women who hold a more progressive view of Islam. Their leader, Mahmoud Mohamed Taha, built a community around the Brotherhood and accepted Howard into the group after his request to explore their community's beliefs.

Unlike many Sufi groups in Sudan, the Brotherhood did not have formal initiation and Howard was encouraged to spend as much time as possible with the group. Taha dedicated the group's focus to understanding the Quran and Islamic tradition as well as promoting positive change. What set Taha and the group apart was largely their belief that the Quran's texts should be adapted to modern times. As a result of this belief, the brotherhood came under heavy pressure. Taha was arrested multiple times. He advocated for women's rights to participate in the same Islamic activities as men, both within society and religiously. The Brotherhood participated in demonstrations on issues that sought a more inclusive sense of community amongst Muslims. The intense bond within the brotherhood sparked Howard's initial interest in joining the group.

In his memoir, Modern Muslims, Howard says, "I chose this group more on the basis of my rapid inclusion in the group initially than, I would have to admit, on being convinced of the power or veracity of its message." Howard describes the hours the group spent together as overwhelming at times, to a point where he eventually asked Taha for more time to himself. Taha granted him this and Howard writes, "Eventually, I managed to find a way to 'do my own thing' while enjoying and learning from everyone's company". The group's beliefs isolated them from the majority of Sudan and made them a government target. Toward the end of his time there, a larger portion of the Brotherhood's members were arrested. Shortly after, Howard was able to use his status as a Fulbright Scholar to meet with U.S. Ambassador Hume Horan and speak on behalf of the Brotherhood. By mid-December 1984, shortly after Howard left Sudan, the Brotherhood members were suddenly released from prison. Their leader Taha, however, was arrested and brought to trial on January 5, 1985, for distributing pamphlets calling for an end to Sharia law, which he believed needed to adapt to modern times. After refusing to recognize the legitimacy of the court under Sharia law, Taha was sentenced to death the following day. On the final page of his memoir, Howard acknowledges Taha and the Brotherhood's powerful influence on his life as he writes, "My teachers have been my brothers and sisters, all of them always ready to push me to the next level."

=== Women's rights ===
Howard covered the Islamic effort to extend women's rights in Sudan in Modern Muslims. He explains that one of Taha's chief goals for the Brotherhood was "women's full participation in all of Islam's obligations". Traditionally in Sudan, women are kept separate from men during religious ceremonies, in-line with traditional practice. For example, women were allowed to be with men during the burial of Am Fadl, an action which "provoke[d] a small group of men...non-Republicans who had been preparing the burial site". Howard explains the group's goal was to "evolve sharia" so as to give women an equal say in Islamic society and law. According to Ikhlas Himlet "there was never a religious society for women before the Republican community". In a talk at Ohio University, Howard discussed the scandal rocking Omdurman-based Ahfad University for Women, wherein the school's headmaster was caught on video beating a student during protests. The incident spread through social media, leading to disciplinary actions against the official, a pattern of events that Howard describes as similar to #MeToo. Howard is one of the only Western academics to study these social developments in Sudan, and one of the few to cover Islamic gender equality movements in Africa.

== Ohio University ==
Steve Howard currently teaches at Ohio University School of Media Arts and Studies, in the Scripps College of Communication. He studies research methods/field methods in Africa; participatory research methods, Islam in Africa and Communication in the Muslim World. He is Director of International Studies. He serves as Director of the National Resource Center for African Language and Area Studies, 1 of 10 in the nation. In 2010 he received the African Students Union's "African Hero Award".

== Publications ==
=== 1990s ===
- Howard, W.S., "Participation and Development," Communication and Development, 1995.
- Howard, W. S., editor and author, lead article, Democracy and Education. "Knowing Democracy: Teachers, Schools and Global Transformation." 1997, p. 2.
- Howard, W. S. and Harold Herman, co-editors, Democracy and Education "Coping with Rapid Change: focus on South Africa's Teachers 1998.
- Howard, W. S. book review, War and Drought in Sudan by E. Eltigani, MESA Bulletin #33, 1999, pp 89-90.
- Howard, W. S., "Introduction," in Retold Tales from Northern Sudan, by Ali Lotfi, Interlink Press, 1999, pp ix-xv.

=== 2000s ===
- Howard, W. S., "World Traveler," Democracy and Education, v. 13, #4. 2000.
- Howard, W. S., "Human Rights Everyday: Sudanese Possibilities," Bulletin of the Center for Advanced Study in International Development. East Lansing, Fall 2000, pp 68–72.
- Howard, W. S., "A Possibility of Inclusion," Democracy and Education, v. 14, #1, 2001.
- Howard, W. S., "Sudanese Brotherhoods," in Stephen Glazier, ed., Encyclopedia of African and African American Religion. Berkshire Press, 2001, pp 330–334.
- Howard, W. S., "Chalk and Dust: Teachers Lives in Rural Sudan," in Bowen and Early, eds. Everyday Life in the Muslim Middle East, 2nd edition, Bloomington, Indiana University Press, 2002, pp 189–198.
- Howard, W. S., "Making Childhood Possible: Education and Health for Africa's Children," 2002, Institute for the African Child Working Papers Series #1, Athens. Howard, W.S., War and Slavery in Sudan by Jok Madut Jok, book review, Middle East Journal, January 2002.
- Howard, W. S., "Mahmoud Mohammed Taha," in Lobban, et al. eds., Historical Dictionary of the Sudan. Scarecrow Press, 2002, pp 287–288.
- Howard, W. S., "Republican Brotherhood," in Lobban, et al., eds. Historical Dictionary of the Sudan. Scarecrow Press, 2002, pp 336–338.
- Howard, W. S., "Transformational Leadership in Islam: Mahmoud Mohammed Taha and the Possibilities of Faith," Kultur, 2002, Islamic University of Indonesia.
- Howard, W. S., "Transforming Islamic Society: Mahmoud Mohammed Taha and the Republican Brotherhood," Fall 2003, Journal for Islamic Studies.
- Howard, W. S., "Ethnography and Exile" 2003, UWC Papers in Education, Cape Town.
- Howard, W. S., "The Possibilities of African Leadership: Children and HIV/AIDS, What shall we do?" 2003 in Singhal and Howard, eds. The Children of Africa Cope with AIDS: Challenges and Possibilities. Ohio University Press.
- Howard, Stephen, "Africa Moves," review of Mobile Africa, H-Africa, H-Net Reviews, September 2003.
- Howard, W. Stephen, "Children and the Five Pillars: How Islam Is Learned," 2004. Democracy and Education, v. 15, #1.

=== 2010s ===
- Howard, Steve, editor, African Conflict and Peacebuilding Review, v. 2 #2, Fall 2012. Indiana University Press.
- Howard, Steve, "Children and Youth," Oxford Annotated Bibliographies of African Studies, 2013.

== Career ==
- 1975–1977: Peace Corps, Volunteer Secondary School teacher.
- 1981–1984: University of Khartoum, Sudan, Research Assistant.
- 1984–1985: Kalamazoo College and Michigan State University, Visiting Instructor, Department of Sociology.
- 1986–2003: Ohio University Department of Educational Studies
- 1988–1989: University of Gezira, Sudan, Visiting Lecturer, Department of Rural Development.
- 1991: Ngwane College, Swaziland, Visiting Lecturer, Department of Education.
- 1991–2015: Ohio University African Studies Program
- 1997: University of the Western Cape, South Africa, Visiting associate professor, Department of Comparative Education.
- 2014–2016: Director, Center for International Studies, Ohio University.
- 2017–2018: Visiting professor, Ahfad University for Women, Omdurman Sudan.

== Bibliography ==
Modern Muslims: A Sudan Memoir (2016)

== Awards ==
- 1981: Fulbright-Hays Dissertation Research Abroad Award
- 1988: Fulbright-Hays Senior Scholar Award
- 1990: Center for Arabic Study Abroad Faculty Fellow, American University in Cairo
- 1994: named Ahenemahene, Chief of the Children, Ahansua, Ghana
- 1995: Baker Research Award, Ohio University
- 1996: Office of African Studies, American University in Cairo, Research Fellow
- 2001: Ohio University Division of Student Affairs, Faculty Contribution Award
- 2002: nominated for Presidential Research Scholar Award, Ohio University
- 2006: Fulbright Senior Scholar Award- Nigeria
- 2009: "African Hero Award," Ohio University African Students Union
- 2009: Presidential Award, from the President of Somalia, for service to community
- 2022: Distinguished Africanist Award of the African Studies Association
