= Rupert Emerson =

American political science professor

Rupert Emerson (August 20, 1899, in Rye, NY – February 9, 1979, in Cambridge, MA) was a professor of political science and international relations. He served on the faculty of Harvard University for forty-three years and served in various U.S government positions.

After serving in the U.S. Navy from 1917–1918, he received a B.A. from Harvard University in 1922, then a Ph.D. at the London School of Economics in 1927. He was a member of the American Political Science Association, the Association for Asian Studies (president, 1952–1953), the African Studies Association (president, 1965–1966), the American Academy of Arts and Sciences, and the Council on Foreign Relations.

Emerson was on the faculty of Harvard University from 1927 until his retirement in 1970. A specialist on nationalism in Asia and Africa, he often guest lectured at universities in East Africa. He was an instructor at Harvard from 1927–1931; assistant professor, 1931–1938; associate professor of political science, 1938–1946; professor of international relations, 1946–1970; emeritus professor of political science, 1970–1979. He was a lecturer at Yale University, 1937–1938; a visiting professor of political science at University of California, Berkeley, 1953–1954, and 1973, at University of California, Los Angeles, 1965–1971, and at the American University in Cairo, 1972.

He served in various U.S. government posts in Washington, DC, 1941–1946. He served as a constitutional advisor to the Korean government in 1962. He also served as a trustee of the Institute of Pacific Relations.

== Awards ==
- Guggenheim Fellowship, University of California, Berkeley, 1953–1954.
- Ford Foundation grant, Africa, 1960–1961.

== Personal ==
His parents were William Key Bond and Maria Holmes (Furman) Emerson. He married Alla Julievna Grosjean on September 14, 1925; they had 4 children: William Key Bond Emerson, Nina Ule Emerson, Natasha Maria Emerson, Rupert Allan Emerson.

== Bibliography ==
- Emerson, R. Papers of Rupert Emerson, ca. 1960-ca. 1970 (inclusive).Unpublished manuscript.
- Emerson, R. (1928). State and sovereignty in modern Germany. New Haven, London: Yale University press; H. Milford, Oxford University Press.
- Emerson, R. (1937). Malaysia: A study in direct and indirect rule. New York: The Macmillan Company.
- Emerson, R. (1942). The Netherlands Indies and the United States. Boston: World peace foundation,.
- Emerson, R. (1949). America's Pacific dependencies: A survey of American colonial policies and of administration and progress toward self-rule in Alaska, Hawaii, Guam, Samoa and the Trust Territory. New York: American Institute of Pacific Relations.
- Emerson, R. (1955). Representative government in southeast Asia. Cambridge: Harvard University Press.
- Emerson, R. (1960). From empire to nation: The rise to self-assertion of Asian and African peoples. Cambridge: Harvard University Press.
- Emerson, R. (1963). Nation building in Africa. In K. W. Deutsch (Ed.), Nation Building (pp. 95–116).
- Emerson, R. (1963). Political modernization: The single-party system. Denver: Social Science Foundation University of Denver.
- Emerson, R. (1964). Self-determination revisited in the era of decolonization. Cambridge, MA: Center for International Affairs, Harvard University.
- Emerson, R. (1964). Nationalism and political development. In J. H. Hallowell (Ed.), Development for what? (pp. 3–33). Durham, N.C.: Published for the Lilly Endowment Research Program in Christianity and Politics by the Duke University Press.
- Emerson, R. (1937). Malaysia: A study in direct and indirect rule. Kuala Lumpur: University of Malaya Press sole distributors University of Malaya Cooperative Bookshop.
- Emerson, R. (1966). Parties and national integration in Africa. In J. G. LaPalombara (Ed.), Political parties and political development (pp. 267–301).
- Emerson, R. (1967). Africa and United States policy. Englewood Cliffs, N.J.: Prentice-Hall.
- Emerson, R. (1971). Reflections on leadership in the third world. In Essays on modernization of underdeveloped societies (Vol. 2, pp. 540–556). Bombay.
- Emerson, R. (1979). State and sovereignty in modern Germany. Westport, CT: Hyperion Press.
- Emerson, R. ([1963?]). Political modernization: The single-party system. Denver: Social Science Foundation, University of Denver.
- Emerson, R., & Kilson, M. (1965). The political awakening of Africa. Englewood Cliffs, N.J.: Prentice-Hall.
- Emerson, R., Mills, L. A., & Thompson, V. M. (1942). Government and nationalism in southeast Asia. New York: International Secretariat, Institute of Pacific Relations.
- Padelford, N. J., & Emerson, R. (1963). Africa and world order. New York: Praeger.
- Young, C., Young, H. E., & Emerson, R. (1999). The accommodation of cultural diversity: Case studies. Basingstoke, New York: Macmillan, St. Martin's Press.
