= Göran Hydén =

Göran C. Hydén
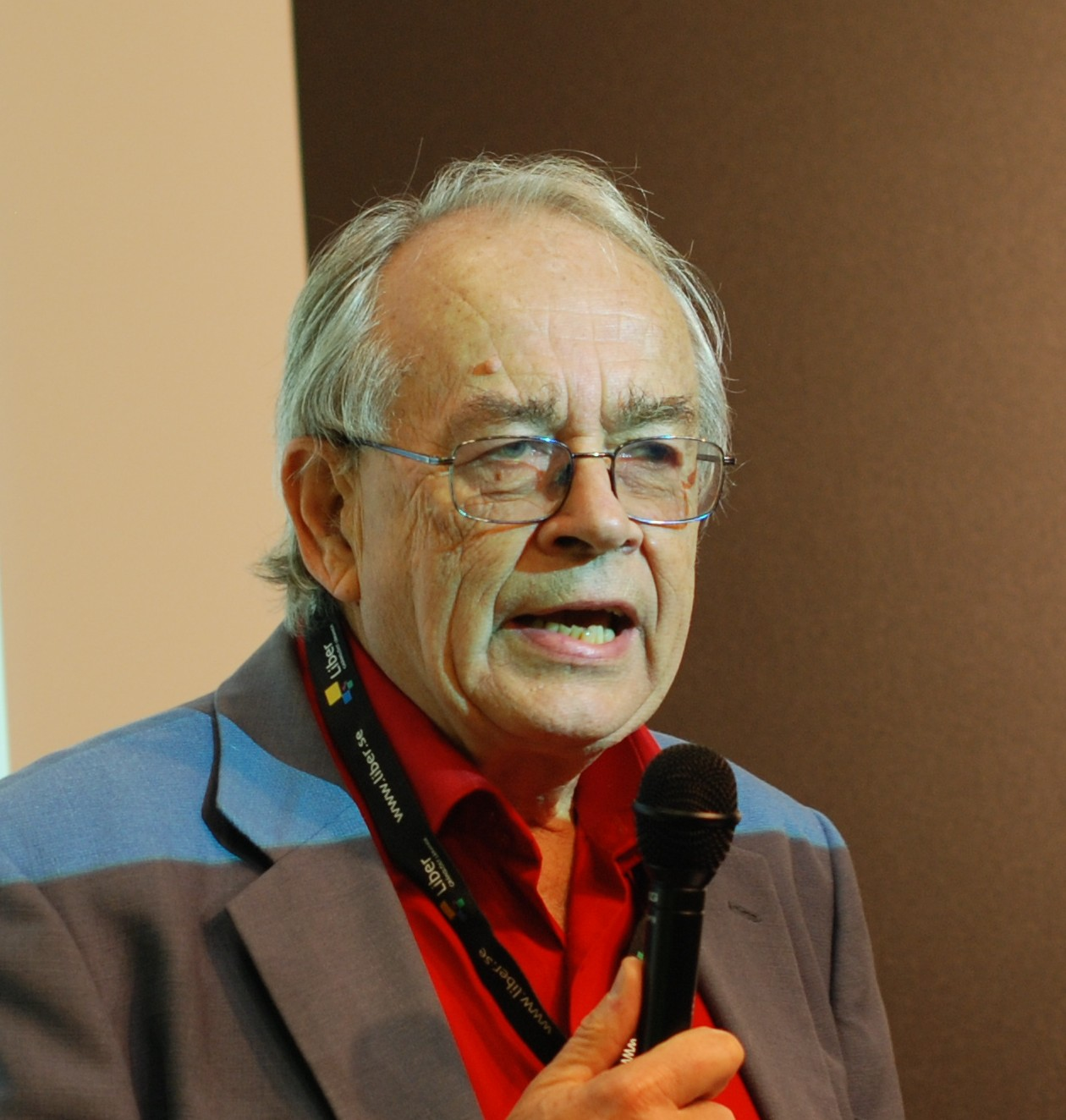
- Swedish-American political science researcher Göran Hydén at the Göteborg Book Fair 2010.
- Born: 1938 (age 87–88)
- Occupation: Political science researcher

Göran Hydén (Born 1938) is a noted Africanist and Distinguished Professor of Political Science at the University of Florida. He was educated in his native Sweden at the University of Lund and at Oxford University and the University of California, Los Angeles (UCLA). He has also worked as an academic at various universities in East Africa including the University of Dar es Salaam, University of Nairobi, and Makerere University. He has researched a wide range of political economy issues related to development in general and Africa in particular. Such issues include: democratization; governance; sustainable development; the role of aid agencies. Hydén's approach has generally been critical of an emphasis on a narrowly defined poverty reduction rather than wider societal progress.

Hydén was formerly president of the African Studies Association.

He is the brother of Håkan Hydén, Professor at Lund University.

Hydén was chairman of the board of the Dag Hammarskjöld Foundation and is also an associate of the Nordic Africa Institute.

Hydén is noted for having introduced various concepts and approaches to development, including the "economy of affection".

Hydén is senior member of the editorial board of Governance in Africa journal (GiA).

== Selected publications ==
- Gedion Onyango and Göran Hydén (eds.) 2021. Governing Kenya:Public Policy in Theory and Practice. Palgrave Macmillan.
- Hydén, Göran, Kazuhiko, Tsuruta Tadasu (eds.) 2020, Rethinking African Agriculture: How Non-Agrarian Factors Shape Rural Livelihoods, Routledge.
- Hydén, Göran (2006), African Politics in Comparative Perspective, second revised edition 2013, Cambridge University Press
- Hydén, Göran Julius Court and Kenneth Mease (2004) Making Sense of Governance: Empirical Evidence from Sixteen Developing Countries. Lynne Rienner Publishers
- Ole Elgstrom and Hydén, Göran (eds.) (2002). Development and Democracy: What Do We Know and How? Routledge.
- Hydén, Göran and Denis Venter (eds.) 2001. Constitution-Making and Democratization in Africa. Africa Institute of South Africa Press.
- Hydén, Göran and Rwekaza Mukandala (eds.) 1999. Agencies in Foreign Aid: Comparing China, Sweden and the United States in Tanzania 1965-1995. Macmillan.
- Hydén, Göran, H.W.O. Okoth Ogendo and Dele Olowu (eds.) 1999. African Perspectives on Governance. Africa World Press.
- Hydén, Göran, Ronald Cohen and Winston Nagan (eds.) 1993. Human Rights and Governance in Africa. University Press of Florida.
- Billie L. Turner II, Hydén, Göran and Robert W. Kates. 1993. Population Growth and Agricultural Change. University Press of Florida.
- Michael Bratton and Hydén, Göran (eds) 1992. Governance and Politics in Africa. Lynne Rienner Publishers.
- Hydén, Göran (1983) No Shortcuts to Progress, University of California Press and Heinemann. ISBN 0435963023
- African Politics in Comparative Perspective, Cambridge University Press 2006
- Hydén, Göran (1980) Beyond Ujamaa in Tanzania: Underdevelopment and an Uncaptured Peasantry, University of California Press and Heinemann. ISBN 0520039971
- Hydén, Göran (1969). Efficiency versus Distribution in East African Cooperatives. East African Literature Bureau.
