= David Wiley (actor) =

American actor (1928–2010)

David W. Wiley
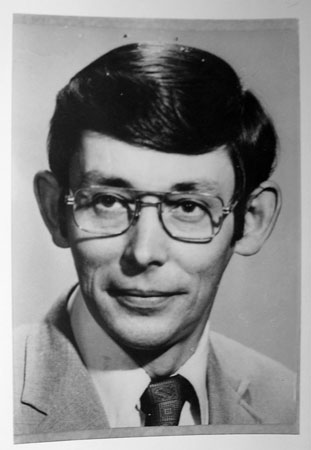
- David Waterman Wiley
- Born: David Waterman Wiley; August 27, 1928; Westborough, Massachusetts, United States
- Died: July 17, 2010 (aged 81); Bloomington, Indiana, United States
- Spouse: Anna Wiley
- Children: 3 sons, 1 daughter

David Waterman Wiley (August 27, 1928 – July 17, 2010) was an American actor, theatre director, and professor associated with several theatre groups and colleges.

== Early life ==
He was born at Robinson Memorial Hospital in Boston, Massachusetts, USA, August 27, 1928; his birth was recorded by his home town of Westborough, Massachusetts, where his father, Pearl I. Wiley, was the steward for Westborough State Hospital. His father served with the AEF in France during World War I. His mother was an occupational therapist at Westborough State Hospital and was active in the Westborough Players Club, a local theatre group.

== Early theatre work ==
During his teenage years, he apprenticed with the professional summer theatre, the Red Barn Theatre, saying later that he learned about the theatre by "cleaning toilets, sweeping floors, and parking cars." He hung around on Mondays to see if he might be chosen as a bit actor in the melodrama of the week. His name appears on cast lists of summers of 1945 and 1946. During the week of July 15, 1946, he played Homer Van Fleet in Ayn Rand's Night of January 16th, directed by William Corrigan. He played T. Newton Todd in Westborough High School's senior class play Spring Green. Programs are in the archives of the Westborough Public Library in Westborough, Massachusetts.

== Emerson College and Group 20 players ==
He followed his interest in theatre at Emerson College, in Boston, graduating in 1950 with a bachelor's degree in literary interpretation. His fellow students identified him in the 1950 yearbook as embodying "sophistication: the dignity of stained glass windows, the vivacity of sun on chrome, alive in his own world, belonging to the drama." While a student at Emerson College, he apprenticed with the Wellesley Theatre on the Green as an actor and stage technician. He eventually joined other serious students of the drama when they incorporated as the Group 20 Players, an aggregation that for a time included fellow actor James Maxwell, and opened a theatre for the classics in the Town Hall of Unionville, Connecticut. A 1948 season schedule identifies Wiley as the lighting designer and as Dan in Night Must Fall. A program indicated he directed Shaw's Candida for Group 20 in December 27–31, 1949.

== Military service and the University of Virginia ==
Drafted into the Army in 1951, he took his basic training at Camp Atterbury in Indiana, then spent a bit over a year in Germany in the Army of Occupation. After his discharge, he continued as actor, director and technician with Group 20, but decided to work on a master's degree at the University of Virginia, joining with theatre friends, particularly Jimmy Helms, William H. Honan, and Patton Lockwood. While at UVA as a graduate student, he directed productions of Twelfth Night and She Stoops to Conquer.

== Assistant professor and advisor of theatre at Longwood College ==
In 1955 he received the Master of Education from UVA and accepted a position as Assistant Professor of Speech and English at Longwood College, a public women's college in Farmville, Virginia, seven miles north of the historic men's of Hampden-Sydney College. He was advisor for the Longwood Players and Hampden-Sydney Jongleurs in productions over ten seasons that included direction and stage design for Ring Round the Moon, Blood Wedding, The Skin of our Teeth, The Crucible, The Lady's Not for Burning, Easter, Pygmalion, A Midsummer Night's Dream, The Plough and the Stars, The Importance of Being Earnest, Hedda Gabler, an English professor's premiere of The Man Who Died Laughing, The Taming of the Shrew, The Power of Darkness, Major Barbara, The Chalk Garden, Romeo and Juliet, Blithe Spirit, and The House of Bernarda Alba.

He encouraged integration of the audiences at Jarman Hall on the Longwood campus just about the time Brown v. Board of Education was calling for integration of public schools in Prince Edward County, Virginia.

== Work on Ph.D. at Indiana University ==
When his mentor, head of the UVA Speech Department, J. Jeffery Auer, moved to Indiana University in 1958, he decided to continue a Ph.D. program at Indiana. In the spring of 1959, he married Anna Applegate Wiley, a Hoosier, who moved to Farmville to join the Longwood College speech and English faculty.

In 1966, with his wife and two sons, he moved to Bloomington, Indiana, where he joined the Indiana University faculty as a lecturer and was called on to direct student productions. Campus life was becoming disrupted in the late 60's and early 70's, and play choices began to reflect the spirit of the times. Most notably, he directed examples of theatre-of-the-absurd plays: Jean Genet's The Blacks and Ionesco's The Chairs. Reaching back to earlier social plays, he directed Paul Green's anti-war play Johnny Johnson and Clifford Odets' Awake and Sing, which also played at the Brown County Summer Theatre in Nashville, Indiana.

On the I.U. campus, he designed and directed Merchant of Venice in 1967 and A Winter's Tale in 1969–70. Student Angela Atwood, who played Perdita in A Winter's Tale, later joined the Symbionese Liberation Army and was killed in combat in California.

== Associate professor at Hilo College ==
After completing his course work for the Ph.D. at Indiana University, he accepted a chance to develop a theatre program at The University of Hawaii at Hilo, where he also completed his two-volume dissertation on Philip Moeller, director of the Theatre Guild. In 1974 he founded the Hilo Foundation for the Performing Arts, a campus/community support group for the arts.

For two years, he and his family enjoyed the Hawaiian ways while he encouraged theatre and music students of Hilo College in theatre production by directing and designing The House of Bernarda Alba, The Music Man, Tom Paine, and Brigadoon.

== Head of speech and theatre at the University of Tennessee at Chattanooga ==
In 1975 David became head of the department of theatre and speech at The University of Tennessee at Chattanooga, where he and his family remained until 1996. A new theatre building and art gallery replaced an aging gymnasium, and the Theatre and Speech Department began to mount an energetic program In the theatre arts. David continued to design and direct a variety of productions and oversaw a small faculty, until he retired as head in 1980. He served on the Board of the Chattanooga Little Theatre from 1977-1985 and directed a community production of Inherit the Wind in the Little Theatre facility.

== ACLU member ==
The Wileys became active in the ACLU when their daughter was one of the plaintiffs in a case in Federal District Court to secure injunctive relief from an unconstitutional program of religious instruction conducted in the public schools of Chattanooga. The ACLU won its case against the school board, but because it was feared the decision would negatively affect UTC, David was asked to step down as head and to change his teaching focus to speech classes. His eldest son, Peter, remembers receiving news of David's demotion:

"I was visiting the UTC campus and Dad took me on a tour of the new music and theatre building at UTC, then still under construction. When we reached the pit of the new theatre, he told me that had just been asked to step down as head of department by UTC's chancellor who, ironically, was an attorney. I asked him what the reason was, he told me it was over his involvement in the Bible case. University officials, he said, felt that he would be in a poor position to raise money to support the growth of the theatre program from the largely conservative donors of Chattanooga and Tennessee. His sense of distress, anger, and fear were palpable. The moment has always stuck in my memory because of its theatrical character. There we were, standing in the half-finished theatre which Dad had worked so hard on bringing to reality. Suddenly it was a stage-set like metaphor for his disappointment. In a cynical act of prior restraint, he would be denied the credit he might have received for his work on the building project and recognition for the success that would come after. The dignity and restraint with which he met this blow, and various threats related to the Bible case, including threats to our family's safety and his life, stand as a testament to my father's character"

He spent time on a first amendment research project about the musical Hair, for the musical was not allowed to play in Chattanooga when it was on the road, and a case about censorship in Chattanooga went to the U.S. Supreme Court.

== Return to directing ==
By 1987, David was once again directing plays and his production of A Raisin in the Sun was featured on a CBS News Sunday Morning segment about Lorraine Hansberry's play. He rounded out his years as a director on the campus of UTC with Moliere's Tartuffe, in 1991, Wendy Kesselman's My Sister in this House, in 1993, and David Mamet's Oleanna, in 1995. He had been an actor or director or designer or technician or publicist for over 100 productions from 1945 to 1995.

A quote in one of his college notebooks says, "Where there is no will, there is no drama." His life was played out with plenty of both will and drama, on and off the stage. (Anna Applegate Wiley, wife)

== Retirement ==
When he retired to Bloomington, Indiana, in 1996, he remained active in the ACLU of Indiana. After his death, the Fall, 2010 ACLU Annual Report notes that:

" [he] was an active supporter of the ACLU for more than 35 years, having been a member of local and state boards in Tennessee and later in Indiana. He also served for two years on the national ACLU board as a Tennessee delegate ... Upon his retirement from UTC, the national ACLU office presented Wiley with the Bill of Rights award in recognition of his "lifetime commitment and contributions to the ACLU-TN, 1976-1996." When he returned to Bloomington in 1996, Wiley continued his active involvement in the ACLU. He served variously as president and secretary of the Bloomington chapter and was a longtime member of the state board, where he was appreciated for his conscientiousness and common sense."

For Wiley, retirement also meant a period of independent research: he continued work on a project he dubbed The Paper Trail, an historical account of his grandfather Ephraim Wiley's service with the 8th Maine Regiment, Company H, during the Civil War. A copy of The Paper Trail is at the 8th Maine Memorial Building at 13 Eighth Maine Avenue on Peaks Island, Maine 04108. He joined the Monroe County Civil War Roundtable of Indiana, giving presentations about his grandfather's 8th Maine Regiment and becoming president. After his death, the roundtable honored him by creating the David Wiley annual fall lecture.

He died on July 17, 2010, in Bloomington, Indiana, after a short illness resulting from a brain tumor. His ashes are interred in the Wiley family plot in Pine Grove Cemetery in Westborough, Massachusetts. Anna Wiley, his wife, recalls, "My great good fortune was to have shared 52 years with David, who took pride in routine and creative work, first for his own satisfaction, then to please and enlighten others, and to add to the world's understanding of what it means to be human."
