= David S. Wiley (sociologist) =

American sociologist

David S. Wiley (born 1935) is professor of sociology at Michigan State University (MSU).

Wiley worked on race relations in Zimbabwe 1961-63 and then conducted research on sociology of urban and rural environments in Zambia, Kenya, and South Africa 1968-2010. From 1968 to 1976 he was a sociology faculty member and director of the African Studies Program (1972–76)at the University of Wisconsin-Madison, and from 1977 to 2008 served as director of the MSU African Studies Center and Professor of Sociology - and Acting Chair of the MSU Department of Sociology (2010–11).

He was president of the African Studies Association (1993); Vice-Chairperson of the U.S. National Commission for UNESCO; co-chair and co-founder of the Council of National Title VI Centers and the Association of Concerned Africa Scholars. He chaired international committees of the National Science Foundation, American Association for the Advancement of Science, and the American Sociological Association. He was a Fulbright Senior Research Scholar 1994-95 at the University of Durban-Westville, now University of KwaZulu-Natal in South Africa. After 2000, his research has concerned environmental issues in South Africa, militarization in Africa, and international education in U.S. universities. To honor his life work, the African Studies Association awarded him their Distinguished Africanist Award in 2025.

== Education ==
- Ph.D. Sociology and Sociology of Religion, Princeton Theol. Seminary and University.
- M. Div. Yale University
- B.A. Wabash College

== Works ==
- International and Language Education for a Global Future: Fifty Years of the U.S. Title VI and Fulbright-Hays Programs, Senior Editor and author, East Lansing, MI: MSU Press, 2011
- International Education in the New Global Era: Proceedings of a National Policy Conference on the Higher Education Act, Title VI, and Fulbright-Hays Programs, co-editor and author, Los Angeles: UCLA, 1982
- Group Portrait: Internationalizing the Disciplines, co-editor and author, New York: American Forum for International Perspectives in Education and National Council for Foreign Languages and International Studies, 1990
- Southern Africa: Society, Economy and Liberation, senior editor and author, East Lansing, Michigan: African Studies Center, MSU, 1982, 335 pp.
- What are the Issues Concerning the U.S. Withdrawal from UNESCO, with Leonard Sussman and Nancy Risser, Washington, D.C.: U.S. National Commission for UNESCO, 1984
- Africa, (with Marylee S. Crofts), 1984
- For chapters, articles, and other works authored, see
