= National Resource Center =

U.S. Department of Education program funding international and area studies

The National Resource Center (NRC) program of the United States Department of Education provided funding grants to American universities to establish, strengthen, and operate language and area or international studies centers that were national resources for teaching any modern foreign language.

Also known as Title VI grants, because the program was formally established in Title VI, Part A, § 602 of the Higher Education Act of 1965 (Title VI was originally authorized as Title VI of the National Defense Education Act of 1958 as a response to the launch of Sputnik and the U.S. government’s recognition that a stronger and broader capacity in foreign language and area studies was needed); these grants supported undergraduate and graduate programs that focus on:

- instruction of fields and topics that provide full understanding of areas, regions or countries;
- research and training in international studies;
- work in the language aspects of professional fields and research, and
- instruction and research on issues critical to current world affairs.

National Resource Centers are also described in 34 CFR (Title 34) Part 656.

The NRC grants were awarded on a quadrennial schedule, through a competition overseen by the Office of International and Foreign Language Education (formerly the International Education Programs Service) within the Department of Education. The most recent award competition provided funding for the FY 2022–2025 period.

== List ==
2022–2025 Grantees
Focus	University	State	Center name	Notes
Africa	Boston University	Massachusetts	African Studies Center	
Africa	Harvard University	Massachusetts	Center for African Studies	
Africa	Howard University	Washington, D.C.	Center for African Studies	
Africa	Indiana University	Indiana	African Studies Program	
Africa	Michigan State University	Michigan	African Studies Center	
Africa	University of California, Berkeley	California	Center for African Studies	
Africa	University of Illinois Urbana-Champaign	Illinois	Center for African Studies	
Africa	University of Kansas	Kansas	Kansas African Studies Center	
Africa	University of Michigan	Michigan	African Studies Center	
Africa	University of Minnesota	Minnesota	African Studies Center	
Africa	University of North Carolina at Chapel Hill	North Carolina	African Studies Center	
Africa	University of Pittsburgh	Pennsylvania	Center for African Studies	
Africa	University of Wisconsin–Madison	Wisconsin	African Studies Program	
Canada	University of Maine	Maine	Canadian-American Center	(Note: Consortium listed as one collaborative NRC)
Canada	State University of New York at Plattsburgh	New York	Center for the Study of Canada	(Note: Consortium listed as one collaborative NRC)
Canada	University of Washington	Washington	Canadian Studies Center	
Canada	Western Washington University	Washington	Center for Canadian-American Studies	
East Asia/Pan-Asia	Columbia University	New York	Weatherhead East Asian Institute	
East Asia/Pan-Asia	George Washington University	Washington, D.C.	Sigur Center for Asian Studies; Institute for Korean Studies	
East Asia/Pan-Asia	Michigan State University	Michigan	Asian Studies Center	
East Asia/Pan-Asia	Stanford University	California	Center for East Asian Studies	
East Asia/Pan-Asia	Ohio State University	Ohio	East Asian Studies Center	
East Asia/Pan-Asia	University of Arizona	Arizona	Center for East Asian Studies	
East Asia/Pan-Asia	University of California, Berkeley	California	Institute of East Asian Studies	
East Asia/Pan-Asia	University of California, Los Angeles	California	Asia Pacific Center	
East Asia/Pan-Asia	University of Chicago	Illinois	Center for East Asian Studies	
East Asia/Pan-Asia	University of Colorado Boulder	Colorado	Center for Asian Studies	
East Asia/Pan-Asia	University of Hawaii	Hawaii	East Asia Council	
East Asia/Pan-Asia	University of Kansas	Kansas	Center for East Asian Studies	
East Asia/Pan-Asia	University of Michigan	Michigan	International Institute	
East Asia/Pan-Asia	University of North Carolina at Chapel Hill	North Carolina	Carolina Asia Center	
East Asia/Pan-Asia	University of Pennsylvania	Pennsylvania	Center for East Asian Studies	
East Asia/Pan-Asia	University of Pittsburgh	Pennsylvania	Asian Studies Center	
East Asia/Pan-Asia	University of Utah	Utah	Intermountain Consortium for Asian and Pacific Studies	
East Asia/Pan-Asia	Brigham Young University	Utah	Intermountain Consortium for Asian and Pacific Studies	
East Asia/Pan-Asia	University of Washington	Washington	East Asia Center, Henry M. Jackson School of International Studies	
East Asia/Pan-Asia	University of Wisconsin–Madison	Wisconsin	Center for East Asian Studies	
International	Georgia Tech	Georgia	Atlanta Global Studies Center	
International	Georgia State University	Georgia	Atlanta Global Studies Center	
International	Indiana University	Indiana	Center for the Study of Global Change	
International	Pennsylvania State University	Pennsylvania	Center for Global Studies	
International	Stanford University	California	Stanford Global Studies	
International	University of Illinois Urbana-Champaign	Illinois	Center for Global Studies	
International	University of Iowa	Iowa	National Resource Center for Translation and Global Literacy	
International	University of Minnesota	Minnesota	Institute for Global Studies	
International	University of Pittsburgh	Pennsylvania	PittGlobal	
International	University of Washington	Washington	Center for Global Studies, Henry M. Jackson School of International Studies	
International	University of Wisconsin–Madison	Wisconsin	Institute for Regional and International Studies	
International	University of Wisconsin–Milwaukee	Wisconsin	Center for International Education	
Latin America	Florida International University	Florida	Kimberly Green Latin American and Caribbean Center	
Latin America	Indiana University	Indiana	Center for Latin American and Caribbean Studies	
Latin America	Michigan State University	Michigan	Center for Latin American and Caribbean Studies	
Latin America	Stanford University	California	Center for Latin American Studies	
Latin America	Ohio State University	Ohio	Center for Latin American Studies	
Latin America	Tulane University	Louisiana	Stone Center for Latin American Studies	
Latin America	University of Arizona	Arizona	Center for Latin American Studies	
Latin America	University of California, Berkeley	California	Center for Latin American Studies	
Latin America	University of California, Los Angeles	California	Latin American Institute	
Latin America	University of Florida	Florida	Center for Latin American Studies	
Latin America	University of Illinois Urbana-Champaign	Illinois	Center for Latin American and Caribbean Studies	
Latin America	University of Kansas	Kansas	Center for Latin American & Caribbean Studies	
Latin America	University of Michigan	Michigan	Center for Latin American and Caribbean Studies	
Latin America	University of North Carolina at Chapel Hill	North Carolina	Consortium in Latin American and Caribbean Studies (Note: Composed of the Institute for the Study of the Americas at UNC-Chapel Hill and the Center for Latin American and Caribbean Studies at Duke)	
Latin America	Duke University	North Carolina	Consortium in Latin American and Caribbean Studies	
Latin America	University of Pittsburgh	Pennsylvania	Center for Latin American Studies	
Latin America	University of Texas at Austin	Texas	LLILAS Benson Latin American Studies and Collections	
Latin America	University of Utah	Utah	Intermountain Consortium for Latin American Studies	
Latin America	Brigham Young University	Utah	Intermountain Consortium for Latin American Studies	
Latin America	University of Wisconsin–Madison	Wisconsin	University of Wisconsin Consortium (Note: Composed of the Latin American, Caribbean & Iberian Studies Program at UW–Madison and the Center for Latin American and Caribbean Studies at UW–Milwaukee)	
Latin America	University of Wisconsin–Milwaukee	Wisconsin	University of Wisconsin Consortium	
Latin America	Vanderbilt University	Tennessee	Center for Latin American, Caribbean, and Latinx Studies	
Middle East	Columbia University	New York	Middle East Institute	
Middle East	George Washington University	Washington, D.C.	Institute for Middle East Studies	
Middle East	Georgetown University	Washington, D.C.	Center for Contemporary Arab Studies	
Middle East	Indiana University	Indiana	Center for the Study of the Middle East	
Middle East	New York University	New York	Kevorkian Center	
Middle East	State University of New York at Binghamton	New York	Center for Middle East and North African Studies	
Middle East	University of Arizona	Arizona	Center for Middle Eastern Studies	
Middle East	University of California, Los Angeles	California	Center for Near Eastern Studies	
Middle East	University of Chicago	Illinois	Center for Middle Eastern Studies	
Middle East	University of Illinois Urbana-Champaign	Illinois	Center for South Asian and Middle Eastern Studies	
Middle East	University of Michigan	Michigan	Center for Middle Eastern & North African Studies	
Middle East	University of North Carolina at Chapel Hill	North Carolina	North Carolina Consortium for Middle East Studies (Note: Composed of the Center for Middle East and Islamic Studies at UNC-Chapel Hill and the Middle East Studies Center at Duke)	
Middle East	Duke University	North Carolina	North Carolina Consortium for Middle East Studies	
Middle East	University of Texas at Austin	Texas	Center for Middle Eastern Studies	
Russia, Eastern Europe and Eurasia	Arizona State University	Arizona	Melikian Center for Russian, Eurasian and East European Studies	
Russia, Eastern Europe and Eurasia	Harvard University	Massachusetts	Davis Center for Russian and Eurasian Studies	
Russia, Eastern Europe and Eurasia	Indiana University	Indiana	Robert F. Byrnes Russian and East European Institute (Note: For Russia and East Europe)	
Russia, Eastern Europe and Eurasia	Indiana University	Indiana	Inner Asian & Uralic National Resource Center (Note: For the Inner Asian and Uralic Region)	
Russia, Eastern Europe and Eurasia	Stanford University	California	Center for Russian, East European and Eurasian Studies	
Russia, Eastern Europe and Eurasia	Ohio State University	Ohio	Center for Slavic, East European and Eurasian Studies	
Russia, Eastern Europe and Eurasia	University of California, Berkeley	California	Institute of Slavic, East European, and Eurasian Studies	
Russia, Eastern Europe and Eurasia	University of Illinois Urbana-Champaign	Illinois	Russian, East European, and Eurasian Center	
Russia, Eastern Europe and Eurasia	University of Kansas	Kansas	Center for Russian, East European & Eurasian Studies	
Russia, Eastern Europe and Eurasia	University of North Carolina at Chapel Hill	North Carolina	Center for Slavic, Eurasian and East European Studies	
Russia, Eastern Europe and Eurasia	University of Pittsburgh	Pennsylvania	Center for Russian, East European & Eurasian Studies	
Russia, Eastern Europe and Eurasia	University of Texas at Austin	Texas	Center for Russian, East European, and Eurasian Studies	
Russia, Eastern Europe and Eurasia	University of Wisconsin–Madison	Wisconsin	Center for Russia, East Europe, and Central Asia	
South Asia	Columbia University	New York	South Asia Institute	
South Asia	Cornell University	New York	Cornell-Syracuse South Asia Consortium (Note: Composed of programs within the Mario Einaudi Center for International Studies at Cornell and the South Asia Center at Syracuse)	
South Asia	Syracuse University	New York	Cornell-Syracuse South Asia Consortium	
South Asia	University of California, Berkeley	California	Institute for South Asia Studies	
South Asia	University of Michigan	Michigan	Center for South Asian Studies; Center for Southeast Asian Studies	
South Asia	University of Pennsylvania	Pennsylvania	South Asia Center (Note: Also the Department of South Asia Studies; the South Asia Regional Studies Graduate Group; and the Center for the Advanced Study of India)	
South Asia	University of Texas at Austin	Texas	South Asia Institute	
South Asia	University of Washington	Washington	South Asia Center	
South Asia	University of Wisconsin–Madison	Wisconsin	Center for South Asia	
Southeast Asia and the Pacific Islands	Cornell University	New York	Southeast Asia Program	
Southeast Asia and the Pacific Islands	Northern Illinois University	Illinois	Center for Southeast Asian Studies	
Southeast Asia and the Pacific Islands	University of California, Berkeley	California	UC Berkeley - UCLA Consortium for Southeast Asian Studies (Note: Composed of the Center for Southeast Asia Studies at UC Berkeley and the Center for Southeast Asia Studies at UCLA)	
Southeast Asia and the Pacific Islands	University of California, Los Angeles	California	UC Berkeley - UCLA Consortium for Southeast Asian Studies	
Southeast Asia and the Pacific Islands	University of Hawaii	Hawaii	Center for Pacific Islands Studies (Note: For the Pacific Islands)	
Southeast Asia and the Pacific Islands	University of Hawaii	Hawaii	Center for Southeast Asian Studies (Note: For Southeast Asia)	
Southeast Asia and the Pacific Islands	University of Michigan	Michigan	Center for Southeast Asian Studies	
Southeast Asia and the Pacific Islands	University of Washington	Washington	Southeast Asia Center	
Southeast Asia and the Pacific Islands	University of Wisconsin–Madison	Wisconsin	Center for Southeast Asian Studies	
Western Europe	University of California, Berkeley	California	Institute of European Studies	
Western Europe	University of Florida	Florida	Center for European Studies	
Western Europe	University of Illinois Urbana-Champaign	Illinois	European Union Center	
Western Europe	University of North Carolina at Chapel Hill	North Carolina	Center for European Studies	
Western Europe	University of Pittsburgh	Pennsylvania	European Studies Center	
Western Europe	University of Texas at Austin	Texas	Center for European Studies	
Western Europe	University of Wisconsin–Madison	Wisconsin	Center for European Studies	

Source: U.S. Department of Education
