= African Studies Association =

Association of scholars

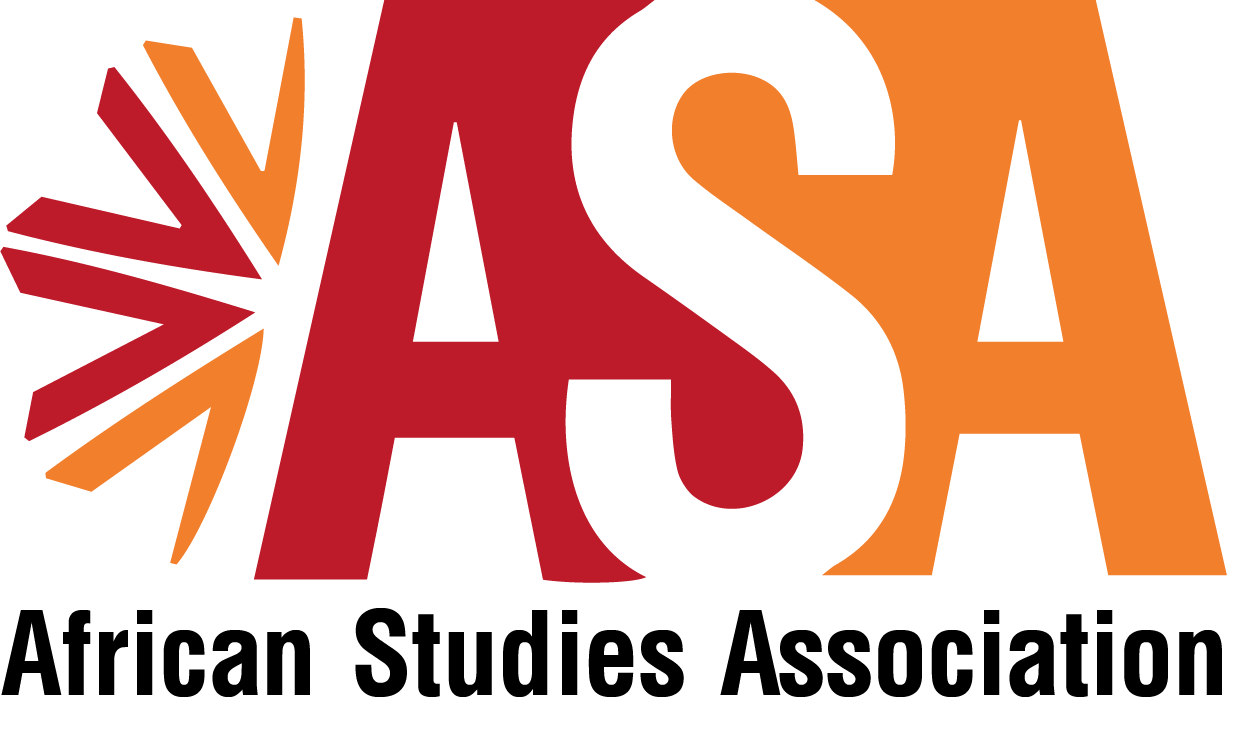
- ASA Logo (updated 2018)
- Formation: 1957
- Headquarters: New Brunswick, New Jersey
- Members: 2000
- President: Nwando Achebe
- Website: www.africanstudies.org

The African Studies Association (ASA) is a US-based association of scholars, students, practitioners, and institutions with an interest in the continent of Africa. Founded in 1957, the ASA is the leading organization of African Studies in North America, with a global membership of approximately 2000. The association's headquarters are at Rutgers University in New Jersey. The ASA holds annual conferences and virtual events for its members year-round.

As a result of racial and political disputes over exclusion from leadership positions of black academics and ASA leaders' ties with the US intelligence and military in the mid-twentieth century, the ASA split in 1968, when the Black Caucus of the ASA, led by John Henrik Clarke, founded the African Heritage Studies Association (AHSA).

The ASA is different from the African Studies Association of Africa (ASAA), which was founded at the University of Cape Town in October 1-2, 2012.

== Awards given by ASA ==
=== ASA Best Book Prize ===
The ASA Book Prize is given annually for the best scholarly work (including translations) on Africa published in English in the previous year and distributed in the United States. The award was originally named after Melville Herskovits, one of the founders of the ASA. The name was changed in 2019 as the ASA considered how to decolonize the discipline of African studies.

=== Distinguished Africanist Award ===
Beginning in 1984, the association has awarded the Distinguished Africanist Award. In 2000, 2001, and since 2022 two awards were given. Winners include:

- 1984 Gwendolen M. Carter
- 1985 Elliott Skinner
- 1986 Jan Vansina
- 1987 Joseph Greenberg
- 1988 Elizabeth Colson
- 1989 Roland Oliver
- 1991 Howard Wolpe
- 1992 Philip D. Curtin
- 1993 J. Ade Ajayi
- 1994 Leopold Sedar Senghor
- 1995 Ali A. Mazrui
- 1996 Thandika Mkandawire
- 1997 Akin Mabogunje
- 1998 Ivor Wilks
- 1999 Catherine Coquery-Vidrovitch
- 2000 Bernth Lindfors
- 2000 J.H. Kwabena Nketia
- 2001 Martin A. Klein
- 2001 Bethwell Ogot
- 2002 Peter Geschiere
- 2003 Joseph E. Harris
- 2004 Francis Deng
- 2005 John Hunwick
- 2006 Bogumil Jewsiewicki
- 2007 John Francis Marchment Middleton
- 2008 Edmond Keller
- 2009 David Robinson
- 2010 Terence Ranger
- 2011 Toyin Falola
- 2012 Jane Guyer
- 2013 Allen Isaacman
- 2014 Boubacar Barry
- 2015 Goran Hyden
- 2016 Sara Berry
- 2017 Iris Berger
- 2018 Emmanuel Gyimah-Boadi
- 2019 Pearl T. Robinson
- 2020 Frederick Cooper
- 2021 Oyeronkẹ́ Oyěwumi
- 2022 Steve Howard
- 2022 Brenda Randolph
- 2023 Richard Joseph
- 2023 Kenneth Harrow
- 2024 Paul Lovejoy
- 2024 Ousmane Kane
- 2025 David Wiley
- 2025 Georges Nzongola-Ntalaja

=== Bethwell Ogot Book Prize ===
The Bethwell A. Ogot Book Prize of the African Studies Association is awarded annually at the ASA Annual Meeting to the author of the best book on East African Studies published in the previous calendar year. Initiated in 2012, the award was made possible by a generous bequest from the estate of the late Professor Kennell Jackson, the award honors the eminent historian, Professor Bethwell A. Ogot.

Winners of this award are:

- 2012 Andrew Ivaska, Cultured States: Youth, Gender, and Modern Style in 1960s Dar es Salaam
- 2013 James R. Brennan, Taifa: Making Nation and Race in Urban Tanzania
- 2014 Shane Doyle, Before HIV: Sexuality, Fertility and Mortality in East Africa 1900–1980
- 2015 J.J. Carney, Rwanda Before the Genocide: Catholic Politics and Ethnic Discourse in the Late Colonial Era
- 2016 Elena Vezzadini, Lost Nationalism Revolution, Memory and Anti-colonial Resistance in Sudan
- 2017 Bert Ingelaere, Inside Rwanda's Gacaca Courts: Seeking Justice after Genocide
- 2018 Getnet Bekele, Ploughing New Ground: Food, Farming, and Environmental Change in Ethiopia
- 2019 Laura Fair, Reel Pleasures: Cinema Audiences and Entrepreneurs in Twentieth-Century Urban Tanzania
- 2020 Elizabeth Giorgis, Modernist Art in Ethiopia
- 2021 Mai Hassan, Regime Threats and State Solutions: Bureaucratic Loyalty and Embeddedness in Kenya
- 2022 David L. Schoenbrun, The Names of the Python: Belonging in East Africa, 900 to 1930
- 2023 Claire L. Wendland, Partial Stories: Maternal Death from Six Angles
- 2024 Ng’ang’a Wahu-Mũchiri, Writing on the Soil: Land and Landscape in Literature from Eastern and Southern Africa
- 2025 China Scherz, George Mpanga, and Sarah Namirembe, Higher Powers: Alcohol and After in Uganda’s Capital City

=== Graduate Student Paper Prize ===
In 2001, the ASA Board of Directors established an annual prize for the best graduate student paper. The prize is awarded at the Annual Meeting for an essay presented at the previous year's Annual Meeting. This prize highlights exceptional scholarship produced by emerging scholars in any African studies related discipline.

Winners of this award are:

- 2002 – Benjamin Lawrance, “Le Revolte des Femmes: Economic Upheaval and the Gender of Political Authority in Lome, Togo, 1931-33”
- 2003 – Staffan Lindberg, “The ‘Democraticness’ of Multiparty Elections: Participation, Competition, and Legitimacy in Africa”
- 2004 – Kristin E. Cheney, “Village Life is Better than Town Life’: identity, migration and development in the Lives of Ugandan child citizens”
- 2005 – Abena Dove Osseo-Asare, “’Dangerous Properties’: Poisoned Arrows and the Case of Strophanthus hispidus in Colonial Gold Coast, 1885 – 1922″
- 2006 – Séverine Autesserre, “Local Violence, National Peace? Local Dynamics of Violence during the Transition in the Eastern Democratic Republic of the Congo”
- 2007 – Habtamu Mengistie Tegegne, “Revisiting Land Tenure in Eighteenth Century Gondärine Ethiopia: Zéga and the Land Charter of Däbrä-Sehay Qwesqwam Church”
- 2008 – Kristin D. Phillips, “Consuming the State: Hunger, Healing, and Citizenship in Rural Tanzania”
- 2009 – Bert Ingelaere, “Peasants, Power, and Ethnicity: Centre and Periphery in the Knowledge Construction in/on Post-Genocide Rwanda”
- 2010 – Laura Weinstein, “The Politics of Government Expenditures in Tanzania: 1999-2007”
- 2011 – Noel Twagiramungu, “The Anatomy of Leadership: A view-from-within Post-genocide Rwanda”
- 2013 – Jamie Miller, “Yes, Minister: Reassessing South Africa's Intervention in the Angolan Civil War”
- 2014 – Catherine Porter, “Bound and Unbound Identities: The Reconstruction of Katanga's Nationhood Struggle”
- 2015 – Kathleen Klaus, “Contentious Land Claims and the Non-Escalation of Violence: Evidence from Kenya's Coast Region
- 2016 – Moritz Nagel, “Precolonial Segmentation Revisited: Initiation Societies, Talking Drums and the Ngondo Festival in the Cameroons”
- 2017 – Amanda B. Edgell, “Vying for the ‘Man's Seat’ – Constituency Magnitude and Mainstream Female Candidature for Non-Quota Seats in Uganda and Kenya”
- 2018 – Shaonan Liu, “Symbol of Wealth and Prestige: A Social History of Chinese-made Enamelware in Northern Nigeria”
- 2019 – Victoria Mary Gorham, “Displaying the Nation: Museums and Nation-Building in Tanzania and Kenya”
- 2020 – Allen Xiao, “Lagos in Life: Placing Cities in Lived Experiences”
- 2021 – Justin Haruyama, “Shortcut English: A Pidgin Language and Symbolic Power at a Chinese-operated Mine in Zambia.”

=== Conover-Porter Award for Africana Bibliography or Reference Work, 1980 - 2018 ===
The Conover-Porter Award is a biannual prize presented during 1980 - 2018 by the Africana Librarians Council of the African Studies Association (US) to reward outstanding achievement in Africana bibliography and reference tools. It honors two pioneers in African Studies bibliography, Helen F. Conover, of the Library of Congress, and Dorothy B. Porter, of Howard University. Latest and first awards:

- 2018 – co-winners Historical dictionary of women in sub-saharan Africa by Kathleen Sheldon. 2nd ed. Rowman & Littlefield, 2016, and the project Dictionary of African Christian biography (DACB) by Jonathan Bonk, project director Overseas Ministries Study Center; Center for Global Christianity and Mission, Boston University.
- 1980 – The United States and Africa: guide to U.S. official documents and government-sponsored publications on Africa, 1785-1975, compiled by Julian W. Witherell. Washington: General Reference and Bibliography Division, Reader Services Dept., Library of Congress, [1978].

== Presidents of ASA ==
Presidents of the ASA are elected annually by the membership. They include:

- 1957–1958 Melville Herskovits, Northwestern University
- 1958 Gwendolen M. Carter, Smith College
- 1959 William O. Brown, Boston University
- 1960 Cornelius W. deKiewiet
- 1961 William O. Jones, Stanford University
- 1962 Vernon McKay, Johns Hopkins University
- 1963 E. Franklin Frazier, Howard University
- 1963 James Smoot Coleman, University of California, Los Angeles
- 1963 Hans Wolff, Michigan State University
- 1964 Paul J. Bohannan, Northwestern University
- 1965 Joseph H. Greenberg, Stanford University
- 1966 Rupert Emerson, Harvard University
- 1967 William A. Hance, Columbia University
- 1968 James Duffy, Brandeis University
- 1969 Benjamin E. Thomas, University of California
- 1970 L. Gray Cowan, Columbia University
- 1971 Philip D. Curtin, University of Wisconsin
- 1972 Carl G. Rosberg, University of California, Berkeley
- 1973 Immanuel Wallerstein, McGill University
- 1974 Absolom Vilakazi, The American University
- 1975 John Marcum, University of California, Santa Cruz
- 1976 Victor Uchendu, University of Illinois at Urbana–Champaign
- 1977 Edris Makward, University of Wisconsin–Madison
- 1978 J. Gus Liebenow, Indiana University
- 1979 Ali Mazrui, University of Michigan
- 1980 Peter Gutkind, McGill University
- 1981 Norman Bennett, Boston University
- 1982 Richard Sklar, University of California, Los Angeles
- 1983 M. Crawford Young, University of Wisconsin–Madison
- 1984 Laura Bohannan, University of Illinois at Chicago Circle
- 1985 Robert J. Cummings, Howard University
- 1986 Gerald J. Bender, University of Southern California
- 1987 Aidan Southall, University of Wisconsin–Madison
- 1988 Georges Nzongola-Ntalaja, Howard University
- 1989 Simon Ottenberg, University of Washington
- 1990 Ann Seidman, Clark University
- 1991 Martin A. Klein, University of Toronto
- 1992 Edmond J. Keller, University of California, Los Angeles
- 1993 David Robinson, Michigan State University
- 1994 Edward A. Alpers, University of California, Los Angeles
- 1995 Goran Hyden, University of Florida
- 1996 Iris Berger, State University of New York at Albany
- 1997 Gwendolyn Mikell, Georgetown University
- 1998 Sandra Greene, Cornell University
- 1999 David Wiley, Michigan State University
- 2000 Lansine Kaba, University of Illinois
- 2001 Catharine Newbury, University of North Carolina
- 2002 Allen Isaacman, University of Minnesota
- 2003 Beverly Grier, Clark University
- 2004 Sandra T. Barnes, University of Pennsylvania
- 2005 Bruce J. Berman, Queen's University
- 2006 Joseph C. Miller, University of Virginia
- 2007 Pearl T. Robinson, Tufts University
- 2008 Aliko Songolo, University of Wisconsin–Madison
- 2009 Paul Tiyambe Zeleza, Loyola Marymount University
- 2012 Aili M. Tripp, University of Wisconsin–Madison
- 2013 Abdi Samatar, University of Minnesota
- 2014 James A. Pritchett, Michigan State University
- 2015 Toyin Falola, University of Texas, Austin
- 2016 Dorothy Hodgson, Rutgers University
- 2017 Anne Pitcher, University of Michigan
- 2018 Jean Allman, Washington University in St. Louis
- 2019 Maria Grosz-Ngaté, Indiana University
- 2020 Ato Quayson, Stanford University
- 2021 Carolyn A. Brown, Rutgers University
- 2022 Ousseina D. Alidou, Rutgers University
- 2023 Adérónké Adésolá Adésànyà, James Madison University
- 2024 Gretchen Bauer, University of Delaware
- 2025 Elizabeth Schmidt, Loyola University Maryland
- 2026 Nwando Achebe, Michigan State University

== Publications ==
Publications include History in Africa: A Journal of Method, published annually and African Studies Review, published quarterly. The Association publishes a biannual newsletter ASA News for its members, and runs a news blog.

== African Heritage Studies Association ==
The African Heritage Studies Association was originally an offshoot of the African Studies Association, and was founded in 1968 by the ASA's Black Caucus and led by John Henrik Clarke.

== See also ==
- St. Louis African Arts Festival
