= Boubacar Barry (historian) =

Senegalese historian and professor

- Born: 1943 (age 82–83); Guinea
- Notable work: Le royaume du Waalo, le Sénégal avant la conquête (1972), La Sénégambie du XVe au XIXe siècle: traite négrière, Islam et conquête coloniale (1988), Slavery and Colonial Rule in French West Africa (1998)
- Awards: 2014 Distinguished Africanist Award of the African Studies Association; * 2016 honorary member of the American Historical Association

Boubacar Barry (born 1943) is a Senegalese professor of modern and contemporary history at the Cheikh Anta Diop University in Dakar. He was the recipient of the 2014 Distinguished Africanist Award of the African Studies Association, and he was selected as the 2016 honorary member of the American Historical Association.

== Publications ==
Barry published many scholarly articles and books, including:

- with Mirjana Trifković and Thierno Diallo (Eds.), Catalogue des manuscrits de l'I.F.A.N. : Fonds Vieillard, Gaden, Brevié, Figaret, Shaykh Mousa Kamara et Cremer en langues arabe, peule et voltaiques, Institut Fondamental d'Afrique Noire Cheikh Anta Diop (IFAN, Sénégal), Dakar, 1966.
- Le royaume du waalo, le Sénégal avant la conquête, F. Maspero, Paris, 1972. M.A. thesis.
  - translation The Kingdom of Waalo Senegal Before the Conquest, Diasporic Africa Press, La Vergne, 2017.
- Bokar Biro : le dernier grand almamy du Fouta Djallon, [ABC], [Paris], [1976].
- La Sénégambie du XVe au XIXe siècle : traite négrière, Islam et conquête coloniale, L'Harmattan, Paris, 1988. PhD thesis.
  - translation Senegambia and the Atlantic slave trade, Cambridge University Press, Cambridge, U.K., 1998.
- with Pierre Kipré and Leonhard Harding (Eds.), Colloque international "Commerce et commerçants en Afrique de l'Ouest: l'exemple du Sénégal et de la Côte d'Ivoire, Conference papers and proceedings, two volumes, L'Harmattan, Paris, 1992.
- with Heinrich Pleticha (Eds.), Weltgeschichte : in 12 Bänden; [von den Anfängen der Menschheit bis zur Gegenwart]. Bd. 12 Krise und Fortschritt, Bertelsmann-Lexikon-Verlag, Gütersloh, 1996.
- Slavery and Colonial Rule in French West Africa, Cambridge Univ. Press, 1998.
- with Elisee Akpo Soumonni and Livio Sansone, Africa, Brazil, and the construction of trans-Atlantic Black identities, Africa World Press, Trenton, NJ, 2008.

== Bibliography ==
- Ibrahima Thioub, L'École de Dakar et la production d'une écriture académique de l'histoire, in Momar-Coumba Diop (Ed.), Le Sénégal contemporain, Karthala, Paris, 2002, p. 109-154 ISBN 2-84586-236-9
