= African Studies Review =

- Discipline: African studies
- Language: English, French
- Edited by: Cajetan Iheka, Yale University

Publication details
- Former name: African Studies Bulletin
- History: 1958-present
- Publisher: African Studies Association (USA)
- Frequency: Quarterly
- Impact factor: 1.82 (2021)

Standard abbreviations
- ISO 4: Afr. Stud. Rev.

Indexing
- ISSN: 0002-0206 (print); 1555-2462 (web)
- LCCN: 2002-227372
- JSTOR: 00020206
- OCLC no.: 51205622
- African Studies Bulletin
- ISSN: 0568-1537

Links
- Journal homepage; Online access at Project MUSE

The African Studies Review is a peer-reviewed academic journal covering African studies. The journal also publishes book and film reviews.

The journal was established in 1958 as the African Studies Bulletin, obtaining its current name in 1970. The editor-in-chief is Cajetan Iheka (Yale University); the Deputy Editor is Kate Luongo (Northeastern University).

== History ==
During its history, it published several supplements, which have now all been consolidated in the main journal.

- Issue: Quarterly Journal of Opinion (1971–1999), later renamed African Issues (2000–2004)
- ASA Review of Books (1975–1980)
- Africana Newsletter (1962–1964)

== Abstracting and indexing ==
The journal is indexed and abstracted in the following bibliographic databases:

- FRANCIS
- Gender Studies Database
- Historical Abstracts
- IBZ Online
- Index Islamicus
- International Bibliography of the Social Sciences
- Linguistic Bibliography
- MLA - Modern Language Association Database
- Periodicals Index Online
- Scopus
- Social Sciences Citation Index

== Journal Prizes ==
The African Studies Review awards prizes to recognize the achievements in scholarship of African studies scholars. In 2001, the board of directors of the African Studies Association established an annual prize, the Graduate Student Paper Prize, for the best graduate student paper presented at the previous year's Annual Meeting. While this is an ASA award, the winning essay is submitted to the African Studies Review for expedited peer review. In 2020, the journal expanded its prizes to include the ASR Best Africa-Based Dissertation Award and the ASR Prize for Best Africa-focused Anthology or Edited Collection.

== ASR Distinguished Lectures ==
The African Studies Review together with the African Studies Association Board of Directors launched a distinguished lecture in 2011 featuring state of the art research in African Studies. The lectures are then published in the journal. Recent lectures include:

- 2022 Amina Mama - “‘The Point is to Change the World’: Imagining Pan-African Epistemic Community in the Global Neoliberal Era”
- 2021 Aminatta Forna - “Writing in Englishes”
- 2020 Robert Edgar - “African Voices Matter: Fifty Years of Historical Research in Southern Africa”
- 2019 Fallou Ngom - “Beyond Orality: Non-Europhone Sources and African Studies in the 21st Century”
