= List of historians of Africa =

This is a list of historians of Africa.

== List ==
Algeria

- Abd al-Aziz ibn Shaddad
- Ahmad al-Maqqari
- Mohamed Harbi
- Ahmed Tewfik El Madani
- Abdelkarim Badjadja
- Tayeb Chenntouf
- Nacéra Benseddik
- Corinne Chevallier
- Sabah Ferdi

Angola

- Alberto Oliveira Pinto

Benin

- Abdou Serpos Tidjani
- Zakari Dramani-Issifou
- Abiola Félix Iroko
- Bertin Calixte Biah
- Dieudonné Gnammankou
- Amzat Boukari-Yabara
- Marie-Cécile Zinsou

Botswana

- Leonard Diniso Ngcongco
- Thomas Tlou
- Alec Campbell
- Alinah Kelo Segobye

Burkina Faso

- François Bassolet
- Joseph Ki-Zerbo
- Titinga Frédéric Pacéré
- Jean-Baptiste Kiéthéga

Burundi

- Pierre Baranyanka
- Joseph Gahama
- Augustin Nsanze

Cabo Verde

- Lilica Boal
- António Aurélio Gonçalves

Cameroon

- Martin Zachary Njeuma
- Joseph-Marie Essomba
- Eldridge Mohammadou
- Engelbert Mveng
- Jean-Paul Notué
- Achille Mbembe
- Virginie Wanyaka Bonguen Oyongmen

Central African Republic

- Raphaël Nzabakomada-Yakoma

Chad

- Ibn Furtu

Côte d'Ivoire

- Pierre Kipré
- Christophe Wondji

DR Congo

- Albert-Joseph Kasongo Wa Kapinga
- V. Y. Mudimbe
- Théophile Obenga
- Zacharie Tshimanga Wa Tshibangu
- Elikia M'Bokolo
- Isidore Ndaywel è Nziem
- Jean Kambayi Bwatshia
- Georges Nzongola-Ntalaja
- Jacques Depelchin

Egypt

- Demetrius the Chronographer
- Annianus of Alexandria
- Manetho
- Ibn Abd al-Hakam
- Al-Balawī
- Eutychius of Alexandria
- Ibn Zulaq
- Muhammad ibn Yusuf al-Kindi
- Al-Musabbihi
- Severus ibn al-Muqaffa
- Al-Qifti
- Ibn al-Tuwayr
- Al-Jawwani
- Jirjis al-Makin Ibn al-'Amid
- Ibn Abd al-Zahir
- Shafi' bin Ali el-Masry
- Ibn al-Dawadari
- Ibn al-Furat
- Ibn Duqmaq
- al-Maqrizi
- Al-Mufaddal ibn Abi al-Fada'il
- Muhammad ibn al-Qasim al-Nuwayri al-Iskandarani
- Al-Nuwayri
- Ibn Taghribirdi
- Ibn Iyas
- al-Jawhari
- Joseph ben Isaac Sambari
- Abd al-Rahman al-Rafai
- Muhammad Farid Abu Hadid
- Ahmad Amin
- Raouf Abbas
- Mostafa El-Abbadi
- Iris Habib Elmasry
- Suʻād Māhir Muḥammad
- Afaf Lutfi al-Sayyid-Marsot
- Younan Labib Rizk
- Wafaa El Saddik
- Khaled Fahmy

Eritrea

- Mai Musié

Ethiopia

- Bahrey
- Machbuba
- Alaqa Taye Gabra Mariam
- Yosef Ben-Jochannan
- Taddesse Tamrat
- Berhanou Abebe
- Tekle Tsadik Mekouria
- Zewde Gebre-Sellassie
- Merid Wolde Aregay
- Shiferaw Bekele
- Bahru Zewde
- Mohammed Hassen

Gabon

- Nicolas Metegue N'nah

The Gambia

- Papa Susso
- Alieu Ebrima Cham Joof
- Hassoum Ceesay
- Foday Musa Suso

Ghana

- Kwame Arhin
- Francis Agbodeka
- Robert Addo-Fening
- James Anquandah
- Albert Adu Boahen
- Edmund Abaka
- Emmanuel K. Akyeampong
- Nana Oforiatta Ayim

Guinea

- Djibril Tamsir Niane
- Djanka Tassey Condé
- Mamadou Dindé Diallo
- Sekouba Bambino

Guinea Bissau

- Patrícia Godinho Gomes

Kenya

- Paul Mboya
- Ali Mazrui
- Bethwell Allan Ogot
- Eisha Stephen Atieno Odhiambo
- Mugo Gatheru
- Henry W. Mutoro
- John Osogo
- William Robert Ochieng
- Gideon Were
- Maina wa Kinyatti
- Ciarunji Chesaina

Liberia

- Abayomi Wilfrid Karnga
- Abeodu Bowen Jones

Libya

- Kalifa Tillisi
- Ali Abdussalam Treki

Madagascar

- Bakoly Domenichini-Ramiaramanana
- Faranirina Esoavelomandroso
- Pierre Randrianarisoa
- Manatsialonina Lucile Rabearimanana
- Yvette Sylla
- Solofo Randrianja

Malawi

- Yesaya Mlonyeni Chibambo
- Samuel Josia Ntara
- William Chafulumira
- L. Daniel Soka
- Henry Masauko Blasius Chipembere
- Kings Mbacazwa Phiri
- Owen J. M. Kalinga
- Desmond Dudwa Phiri
- Paul Tiyambe Zeleza

Mali

- Balla Fasséké
- Mahmud Kati
- Banzumana Sissoko
- Kassé Mady Diabaté
- Siramori Diabaté
- Amadou Hampâté Bâ
- Sékéné Mody Cissoko
- Massa Makan Diabaté
- Madina Ly-Tall
- Drissa Diakité (historian)
- Tidiane Diakité
- Mahmoud Abdou Zouber
- Bintou Sanankoua
- Sidiki Diabaté
- Adame Ba Konaré

Mauritania

- Ahmad ibn al-Amin al-Shinqiti
- Deddoud ould Abdellahi

Mauritius

- Abdool Cader Kalla
- Alfred North-Coombes
- Amédée Nagapen
- Auguste Toussaint
- Vijaya Teelock

Morocco

- Ibn Battuta
- al-Idrisi
- Mohammed al-Baydhaq
- Ibn al-Khabbaza
- Ibn Abd al-Malik al-Marrakushi
- Ibn Abi Zar
- 'Abd al-Wahid al-Marrakushi
- Ibn Hammad
- Abu al-Hasan Ali al-Jaznai
- Taqi al-Din al-Fasi
- Abd al-Aziz al-Fishtali
- Mohammed al-Duayf
- Mohammed al-Ifrani
- Abu al-Qasim al-Zayyani
- Sulayman al-Hawwat
- Mohammed al-Qadiri
- Ahmad ibn Hamdun ibn al-Hajj
- Ibn Zaydan
- Ahmad ibn Khalid an-Nasiri
- Ibn Ghazi al-Miknasi
- Mohammed Akensus
- Tuhami al-Wazzani
- Mohammed Boujendar
- Al-Abbas ibn Ibrahim as-Samlali
- Abdelwahab Benmansour
- Robert Assaraf
- Mohammed Mokhtar Soussi
- Mohamed Hajji
- Mohammed Zniber
- Abdelhadi Tazi
- Brahim Boutaleb
- Germain Ayache
- Halima Ferhat
- Abdelhak Mrini
- Michel Abitbol
- Ali Azayku
- Abdelmajid Benjelloun
- Ahmed Toufiq
- Muhammad Al Barka

Mozambique

- Yohanna Barnaba Abdallah
- Mario Azevedo
- João Paulo Borges Coelho
- Fernando Ganhão

Namibia

- Andreas Vogt (historian)
- Peter Katjavivi

Niger

- Boubou Hama
- André Salifou
- Diouldé Laya
- Mamoudou Djibo

Nigeria

- Abd al-Qadir dan Tafa
- Samuel Johnson
- T. Ola Avoseh
- Akiga Sai
- Jacob Egharevba
- Israel Iwekanuno
- Olumide Lucas
- Muhammadu Junaidu
- Kenneth Dike
- Saburi Biobaku
- TGO Gbadamosi
- J. F. Ade Ajayi
- E. A. Ayandele
- Obaro Ikime
- Bala Usman
- Isaac Adeagbo Akinjogbin
- Adiele Afigbo
- E. J. Alagoa
- Philip Igbafe
- Bassey Wai-Andah
- Joseph Adebowale Atanda
- Toyin Falola
- Bawuro Barkindo
- Abdullahi Mahadi
- Anthony Ijaola Asiwaju
- G. O. Olusanya
- Tekena Tamuno
- Mahdi Adamu
- Nowa Omoigui
- Folarin Shyllon
- Boniface Obichere
- Mahmud Modibbo Tukur
- Michael Crowder
- Adebowale Adefuye
- Bolanle Awe
- Don C. Ohadike
- Bukar Usman
- Martin Lynn
- Bala Achi
- Akinwumi Ogundiran
- Olayemi Akinwunmi
- O. A. Akinyeye
- Rufus Akinyele
- Joseph E. Inikori
- CBN Ogbogbo
- Ayodeji Olukoju
- Akanmu Adebayo
- Saheed Aderinto
- Abosede George
- Obi Iwuagwu
- Apollos Okwuchi Nwauwa
- Chima Korieh
- Olufunke Adeboye
- Max Siollun
- O. C. Adesina
- Nwando Achebe

Republic of Congo

- Jérôme Ollandet
- Scholastique Dianzinga

Rwanda

- Alexis Kagame
- Ferdinand Nahimana
- Gamaliel Mbonimana
- Emmanuel Ntezimana

São Tomé and Príncipe

- Carlos Neves

Senegal

- Alioune Sarr
- Yoro Dyao
- Cheikh Anta Diop
- Iba Der Thiam
- Babacar Sedikh Diouf
- Pathé Diagne
- Oumar Kane (historian)
- Abdoulaye Ly
- Iba Der Thiam
- Aboubacry Moussa Lam
- Boubacar Barry
- Abdoulaye Bathily
- Mamadou Diouf
- Penda Mbow
- Ibrahima Thioub
- Pape Demba "Paco" Samb
- Louis Diène Faye

Sierra Leone

- A. B. C. Sibthorpe
- Arthur Porter
- Cyril Foray
- Akintola J.G. Wyse
- Joseph Ben Kaifala
- Violet Showers Johnson

Somalia

- Mohamed Haji Mukhtar
- Abdukadir Osman
- Jama Omar Issa

South Africa

- Fransjohan Pretorius
- George McCall Theal
- John Agar-Hamilton
- George Cory
- H. B. Thom
- Mbombini Molteno Sihele
- Johan Hendrik Breytenbach
- Silas Molema
- Gustav Preller
- Anna Böeseken
- Eric Rosenthal
- Arrie van Rensburg
- Mohamed Adhikari
- Colin Bundy
- Colin Webb (historian)
- Shula Marks
- Fransjohan Pretorius
- Noel Mostert
- Martin Legassick
- William Beinart
- Jeff Guy
- Milton Shain
- Saul Dubow
- Carolyn Hamilton
- Jeff Peires
- John Laband
- Nigel Worden
- Jacob Dlamini
- Bernard K. Mbenga
- Zeblon Zulu
- Hlonipha Mokoena

Sudan

- Yusuf Fadl Hasan
- Fadwa Taha

Tanzania

- Nathaniel Mtui
- Arnold Temu
- Fidelis Masao
- Isaria Kimambo
- Abdul Sheriff

Togo

- Atsutsè Kokouvi Agbobli

Tunisia

- Ibn Khaldun
- Ahmad ibn Abi Diyaf
- Hassan Husni Abd al-Wahhab
- Juliette Bessis
- Ammar Mahjoubi
- Mohamed Talbi
- Hichem Djait
- M'hamed Hassine Fantar
- Lucette Valensi
- Abdeljelil Temimi
- Sophie Bessis
- Mohamed Hédi Chérif
- Latifa Lakhdar
- Mounira Harbi-Riahi
- Dalenda Larguèche
- Adnen Mansser
- Mounira Chapoutot
- Liliane Ennabli
- Mohamed El Aziz Ben Achour

Uganda

- Apollo Kaggwa
- John W. Nyakatura
- Festo Karwemera
- Phares Mukasa Mutibwa
- Samwiri Lwanga-Lunyiigo
- Catherine Namono

Zambia

- Mutumba Mainga

Zimbabwe

- Ngwabi Mulunge Bhebe
- Ken Mufuka
- Stan Mudenge
- David Chanaiwa
- Elleck Mashingaidze
- Jacob Chikuhwa
- Ngwabi Bhebhe
- Alois Mlambo
- Innocent Pikirayi
- Shadreck Chirikure
- Patricia Hayes

Africanists

- al-Masudi
- Al-Bakri
- Leo Africanus
- Reginald Coupland
- Robert Elwyn Bradbury
- Arturo Alfonso Schomburg
- Anatole-Joseph Toulotte
- John Fage
- Richard Leslie Hill
- William Miller Macmillan
- Roland Oliver
- William Leo Hansberry
- Basil Davidson
- Jean Vercoutter
- Jean Yoyotte
- John D. Hargreaves
- Hélène d'Almeida-Topor
- Endre Sík
- Jean Devisse
- Jean Suret-Canale
- H. F. C. Smith
- Richard Pankhurst
- Thomas Lionel Hodgkin
- Terence Ranger
- Robert Smith
- Martin A. Klein
- A. G. Hopkins
- Roy Bridges
- Julian Cobbing
- John Parkington
- David Phillipson
- Robert O. Collins
- René Rebuffat
- Kevin Shillington
- Douglas Rimmer
- Andrew D. Roberts
- Charles Thurstan Shaw
- David Northrup
- Philip D. Curtin
- Jan Vansina
- Jehan Desanges
- Yves Person
- Rex Sean O'Fahey
- Tadeusz Lewicki
- Yvette Duval
- Adrian Hastings
- Frederick Cooper
- Catherine Coquery-Vidrovitch
- Walter Rodney
- John Henrik Clarke
- Asa Grant Hilliard III
- John E. Flint
- Merrick Posnansky
- Nehemia Levtzion
- Elizabeth Isichei
- Ivor Wilks
- Michael Izard
- Dierk Lange
- Yuri Kobishchanov
- Enrico Cerulli
- Raymond K. Kent
- Louise Pirouet
- Bernard Lugan
- Joseph C. Miller
- Stefan Jakobielski
- Ivan Hrbek
- Jean Herskovits
- Luboš Kropáček
- Robert Hess
- Linda Heywood
- E. Jefferson Murphy
- David Newbury
- Dmitri Olderogge
- Bill Freund
- Oliver Furley
- Allen Isaacman
- Lewis H. Gann
- Hugh C. Brooks
- Joseph Roger de Benoist
- Jean-Pierre Chrétien
- Christopher Ehret
- René Lemarchand
- Stephen Ellis
- Tore Linné Eriksen
- Claude Meillassoux
- Tudor Parfitt
- Judith E. Tucker
- Ian L. Campbell
- John Thornton
- Murray Last
- Cheryl Johnson-Odim
- Marika Sherwood
- Hakim Adi
- David Maxwell
- Anne Hugon
- Martin Meredith
- Lorelle D. Semley
- Gérard Prunier
- Megan Vaughan
- Miles Larmer
- Candice Goucher
- Derek R. Peterson
- Sandra Elaine Greene
- Jan Jansen
- Douglas H. Johnson
- Butch Ware
- David Olusoga
- Felicitas Becker
- Sylviane Diouf
