= Atanda =

- Gender: Male
- Language: Yoruba

Origin
- Origin: Nigeria
- Meaning: One born to shine
- Region of origin: Southwestern

pronunciation

Atanda is a Nigerian male given name and surname of Yoruba origin. It means "one born to shine".

== Given name ==
- Atanda Musa (born 1960), Nigerian table tennis player
- Atanda Fatai Williams (1918–2002), Nigerian jurist
- Atanda Ayila Yussuf (born 1984), Nigerian footballer
- Atanda Yusuf, Nigerian politician

== Surname ==
- Joseph Adebowale Atanda (1932–1996), Nigerian historian
- Madam Kofo (Kofoworola Abiola Atanda), Nigerian actress
- Oluremi Atanda (1939–2024), Nigerian agricultural scientist
- Sodiq Atanda (born 1993), Nigerian footballer
