= Shyllon =

Shyllon is a surname. Notable people with the surname include:

- Folarin Shyllon (1940–2021), British historian
- Yemisi Adedoyin Shyllon, Nigerian prince
