= Oluremi =

- Gender: Male
- Language: Yoruba

Origin
- Origin: Nigeria
- Meaning: The Lord consoles me
- Region of origin: South West, Nigeria

Olúrẹ̀mí is a Nigerian female given name and of Yoruba origin, which means "The Lord consoles me.". Olúrẹ̀mí once exclusively feminine, is now being adopted by males, reflecting shifting societal norms and the growing trend of unisex names.

== Notable individuals with the name ==
- Oluremi Atanda (1939–2024), Nigerian agricultural scientist
- Esther Oluremi Obasanjo (born 1941), First Lady of Nigeria from 1976 to 1979
- Oluremi Oyo (1952–2014), Nigerian journalist
- Oluremi Comfort Sonaiya (born 1955), Nigerian politician, educationalist and writer
- Oluremi Tinubu (born 1961), First Lady of Nigeria since 2023
