= Al-Maqdisi =

Arab geographer (c. 945/946 – 991)

Muḥammad ibn Aḥmad Shams al-Dīn Al-Maqdisī مُحَمَّد ابْن أَحْمَد شَمْس ٱلدِّيْن ٱلْمَقْدِسِي
- Born: c. 945/946 CE; Jerusalem, Abbasid Caliphate
- Died: 991 CE; Fatimid Caliphate

Academic background
- Influences: Al-Balkhi

Academic work
- Era: Islamic Golden Age
- School or tradition: Balkhi school
- Main interests: Islamic geography
- Notable works: The Best Divisions in the Knowledge of the Regions

Shams al-Din Abu Abd Allah Muhammad ibn Ahmad ibn Abi Bakr, (Note: Arabic: شَمْس ٱلدِّيْن أَبُو عَبْد ٱلله مُحَمَّد ابْن أَحْمَد ابْن أَبِي بَكْر, romanized: Shams al-Dīn Abū ʿAbd Allāh Muḥammad ibn Aḥmad ibn Abī Bakr; c. 945/946 – 991) commonly known by the nisba al-Maqdisi (Note: Arabic: ٱلْمَقْدِسِي, romanized: al-Maqdisī) or al-Muqaddasī, (Note: Arabic: ٱلْمُقَدَّسِي) meaning Jerusalemite, was a medieval Arab geographer, author of The Best Divisions in the Knowledge of the Regions (Note: Aḥsan al-taqāsīm fī maʿrifat al-aqālīm) and Description of Syria.

His work has been praised for its vivid descriptions, especially of his native region of Palestine, a toponymic identity with which he identified.

== Biography ==
=== Sources ===
Outside of his own work, there is little biographical information available about al-Maqdisi. He is neither found in the voluminous biographies of Ibn Khallikan (d. 1282) nor were the aspects of his life mentioned in the works of his contemporaries.

=== Early life and education ===
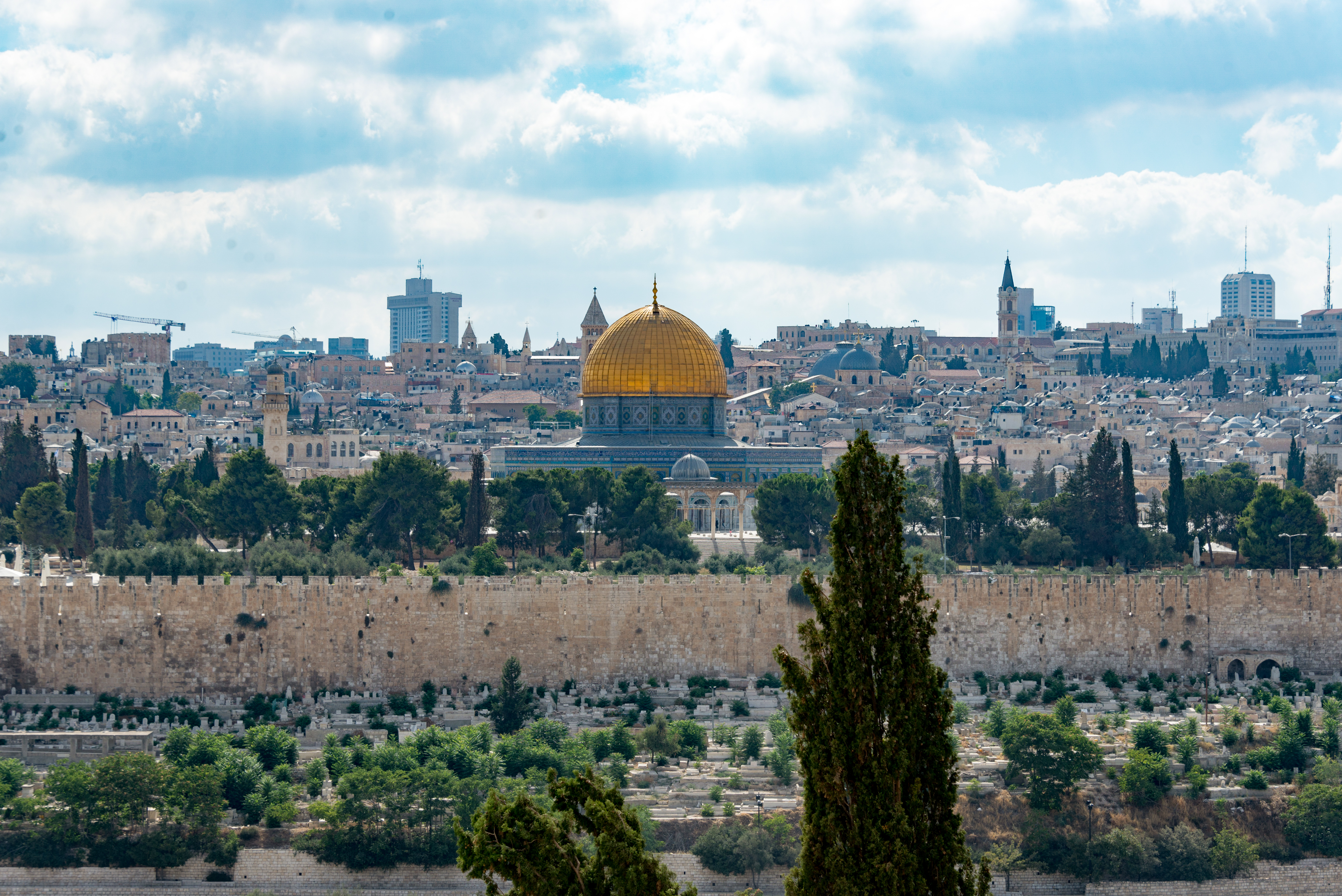
Al-Maqdisi was from Jerusalem (Bayt al-Maqdis in Arabic), from which he received his name. He was particularly fond of the city and described it at length in his geographic work.

He was born in Jerusalem in c. 946 and belonged to a middle-class family whose roots in the city's environs dated from the period approximate to the 7th-century Muslim conquest. Al-Maqdisī or alternatively al-Muqaddasī was a nisba indicating that he was from "Bayt al-Maqdis" or "Bayt al-Muqaddas", the Muslim names for Jerusalem. His paternal grandfather, Abu Bakr al-Banna, had been responsible for the construction of Acre's maritime fortifications under orders from Ahmad ibn Tulun (r. 868–884), the autonomous Abbasid governor of Egypt and Syria. Al-Maqdisi's maternal grandfather, Abu Tayyib al-Shawwa, moved to Jerusalem from Biyar in Khurasan and was also an architect.

As can be inferred by his work and social background, al-Maqdisi was likely well-educated. Historian André Miquel observes that al-Maqdisi's use of "rhymed prose, even poetry" is indicative of a strong knowledge in Arabic grammar and literature. Likewise, his writings show that he possessed an early interest in Islamic jurisprudence, history, philology and hadith.

=== Pursuits in geography ===
Al-Maqdisi made his first Hajj (pilgrimage to Mecca) in 967. During this period, he became determined to devote himself to the study of geography. To acquire the necessary information, he undertook a series of journeys throughout the Islamic world, ultimately visiting all of its lands with the exception of al-Andalus (Iberian Peninsula), Sindh and Sistan. The known dates or date ranges of al-Maqdisi's travels include his journey to Aleppo sometime between 965 and 974, his second pilgrimage to Mecca in 978, a visit to Khurasan in 984 and his stay in Shiraz in 985 when he decided to compose his material. The finished work was titled The Best Divisions for the Knowledge of the Provinces. (Note: Aḥsan al-taqāsīm fi maʾarfat al-aqalīm)

== Work ==
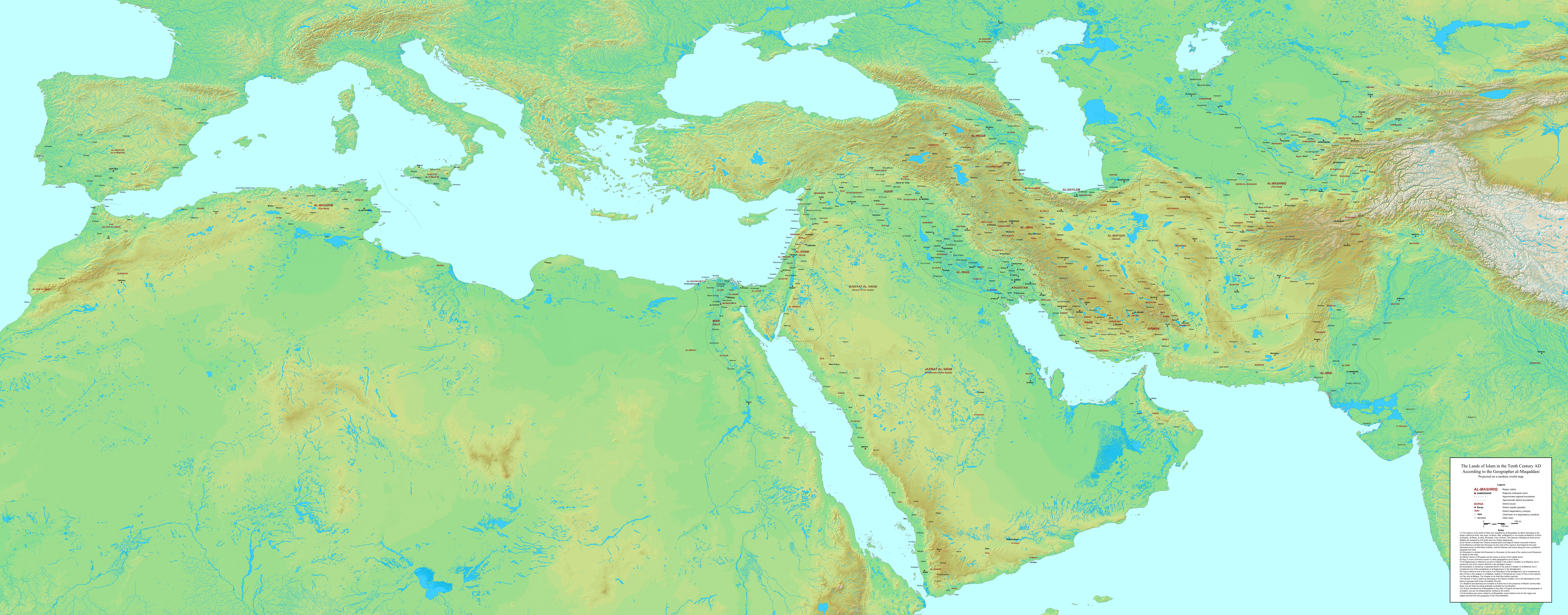
The regions of Islam in the tenth century, based on Al-Maqdisi's work

Though possibly influenced by predecessors al-Jahiz (d. 869), who introduced the "science of countries", and Ibn al-Faqih (fl. 902), al-Maqdisi "surpassed" both "all to the advantage of what certainly should be called a true geography", according to Miquel. Moreover, Miquel surmises that al-Maqdisi "was probably the first to have desired and conceived" true geography as an "original science", an assertion that al-Maqdisi himself makes in the preface of Aḥsan al-taqāsīm. He belonged to the school known as the "atlas of Islam", inaugurated by Abu Zayd al-Balkhi (d. 934) and developed by Istakhri (d. 957) and al-Maqdisi's contemporary Ibn Hawqal (d. 978).

Al-Balkhi's school almost exclusively dealt with the Islamic world, to which al-Maqdisi too devoted his studies. Al-Maqdisi refers to this world as al-mamlaka or al-Islām (the Domain of Islam), a unique concept in which all of the lands of Islam constituted a single domain. He subdivided this domain into two parts: mamlakat al-ʿArab (domain of the Arabs) and mamlakat al-ʿAjam (domain of the non-Arabs). The former consisted, from east to west, of the six provinces of Iraq, Aqur (Upper Mesopotamia), Arabia, Syria, Egypt and the Maghreb, while the latter consisted of the eight provinces of the Mashriq (Sistan, Afghanistan, Khurasan and Transoxiana), Sindh, Kirman, Fars, Khuzistan, Jibal, Daylam and Rihab (Armenia, Adharbayjan and Aran).

=== Description of Palestine ===
Miquel notes al-Maqdisi was "very much attached to the Palestine of his birth and to the town whose name he bears".

Aḥsan al-taqāsīm gives a systematic account of all the places and regions al-Maqdisi had visited. He devoted a section of his book to Bilad al-Sham (the Levant) with a particular focus on Palestine. In contrast to travelers to Palestine, such as Arculf (c. 680s), Nasir Khusraw (c. 1040s) and others, who were pilgrims, al-Maqdisi gave detailed insights into the region's population, way of life, economy and climate. He paid special attention to Jerusalem, detailing its layout, walls, streets, markets, public structures and landmarks, particularly the Haram ash-Sharif (Temple Mount) and the latter's Dome of the Rock and Jami Al-Aqsa. He described the city's people and customs, focusing on its Muslims, but also its Christian and Jewish communities. He was critical of the way Christians displayed themselves in Jerusalem, and described the city as "a golden basin full of scorpions", a phrase later used as the title of a book by Con Coughlin.

Al-Maqdisi also gave extensive overviews of Ramla and Tiberias, the capitals of the Palestine and Jordan districts, respectively. To a lesser extent, he described Acre, Beisan, Bayt Jibrin, Caesarea, Amman and Aila. In his descriptions of the aforementioned cities, al-Maqdisi noted their prosperity and stability and gave a general impression of Palestine as densely populated and wealthy, with numerous localities.

Guy Le Strange comments on al-Maqdisi's work:

His description of Palestine, and especially of Jerusalem, his native city, is one of the best parts of the work. All that he wrote is the fruit of his own observation, and his descriptions of the manners and customs of the various countries, bear the stamp of a shrewd and observant mind, fortified by profound knowledge of both books and men.

Palestinian scholars and artists have noted that Al-Maqdisi identified himself as "Palestinian" (filastini) when asked if he was "Egyptian" during his travels in Shiraz. His writings also recount thirty-six different names he was given by those he encountered during his travels, the first two being Muqadassi ("Jerusalemite") and Filastini ("Palestinian").

=== Description of Eastern Arabia ===
Hafit {Tuwwam} abounds in palm trees; it lies in the direction of Hajar {Al-Hasa}, and the mosque is in the markets ... Dibba and Julfar, both in the direction of the Hajar, are close to the sea ... Tuwwam has been dominated by a branch of the Quraysh...

— Al-Muqaddasi, 985 CE.

Al-Maqdisi mentioned regions in Eastern Arabia which form parts of what are now Saudi Arabia, the UAE and Oman. Al-Hasa is an important oasis region in the eastern part of Saudi Arabia, whereas Tuwwam is another oasis region split between the UAE and Oman, comprising the modern settlements of Al Ain and Al-Buraimi on different sides of the Omani-UAE border. Dibba is another region split between the UAE and Oman, touching the Musandam Peninsula, which is partly ruled by the Emirate of Ras Al Khaimah, where the ancient settlement of Julfar is located.

== See also ==
- List of Arab scientists and scholars
- Zedekiah's Cave

== Bibliography ==
- Avni, Gideon (2014). The Byzantine-Islamic Transition in Palestine: An Archaeological Approach. Oxford: Oxford University Press. ISBN 978-0-19-968433-5.
- Al-Ju'beh, Nazmi (2008). Heacock, Roger (ed.). Temps et espaces en Palestine: Flux et résistances identitaires. Beirut, Lebanon: Presses de l'Ifpo. pp. 205–231. ISBN 9782351592656.
- Kish, George (1978). A Source Book in Geography (Reissue, illustrated ed.). Harvard University Press. p. 200. ISBN 978-0-674-82270-2.
- Le Strange, G. (1890). Palestine Under the Moslems: A Description of Syria and the Holy Land from A.D. 650 to 1500. Committee of the Palestine Exploration Fund.
- Gildemeister, J. (1884). "Mukaddasi". Zeitschrift des Deutschen Palästina-Vereins. 7: 143 –172, 215 – 230.
- Masalha, Nur (2018), Palestine:A Four Thousand Year History, Bloomsbury Publishing
- Morton, Michael Quentin (15 April 2016). Keepers of the Golden Shore: A History of the United Arab Emirates (1st ed.). London: Reaktion Books. ISBN 978-1-7802-3580-6. Archived from the original on 19 February 2023.
- Miquel, A. (1993). "Al-Mukaddasi". In Bosworth, C. E.; van Donzel, E.; Heinrichs, W. P. & Pellat, Ch. (eds.). The Encyclopaedia of Islam, Second Edition. Volume VII: Mif–Naz. Leiden: E. J. Brill. pp. 492–493. ISBN 978-90-04-09419-2.
- Rahman, Mushtaqur (2008). "Al‐Muqaddasī". Encyclopaedia of the History of Science, Technology, and Medicine in Non-Western Cultures. doi:10.1007/978-1-4020-4425-0_8963. ISBN 978-1-4020-4559-2.
- Reuben, A. (2024-06-25), "The liver in Judaism", Clin Liver Dis (Hoboken), 23 (1), doi:10.1097/CLD.0000000000000234
- Mukaddasi (1886). Le Strange, G. (ed.). Description of Syria, including Palestine. London: Palestine Pilgrims' Text Society.
- Scholten, Arnhild (1980). "Al-Muqaddasi, c. 945-c. 988". In Freeman, T. W.; Pinchemel, P. (eds.). Geographers: Biobibliographical Studies, Volume 4. Mansell Publishing. ISBN 978-1-4742-3110-7.
