= Mbonimana =

Mbonimana is a Rwandan surname. Notable people with the surname include:

- Gamaliel Mbonimana, Rwandan historian;
- Gamariel Mbonimana (born 1980), Rwandan politician.
