= David Aworawo =

Nigerian Academic (born 1968)

- Born: 5 October 1968 (age 58)

Academic background
- Education: University of Lagos
- Thesis: "Diplomacy and the Development of Equatorial Guinea, 1900–1990" (2001)

Academic work
- Discipline: International relations, political history, diplomatic history, strategic studies and development studies

David Aworawo (born 5 October 1968) is a Nigerian Professor of International Relations and Strategic Studies, and the Head of the Department of History and Strategic Studies, University of Lagos, Nigeria. He specializes in strategic studies, international relations, political history and development studies. He has published widely in the areas of African politics and international relations.

== Background ==
David Aworawo was born on 5 October 1968. Aworawo attended the University of Lagos, where he earned his B.A., M.A. and Ph.D. degrees in history in 1991, 1993 and 2001 respectively. For his doctoral thesis titled "Diplomacy and the Development of Equatorial Guinea, 1900–1990", Aworawo earned the Nigerian Universities Doctoral Theses Award in December 2003. As an undergraduate student, Aworawo distinguished himself winning several awards from his sophomore years including University of Lagos Scholarship for the Best Students in 1989, 1990 and 1991. Upon graduation in 1992, he also won the Prof. Gabriel Olusanya Prize for the Best Graduating Student in History, and the Chief Ayo Rosiji Prize for the Best Project in History.

== Career ==
Shortly after completing his doctoral programme in 2001, David Aworawo began his teaching career as the Lecturer and Head of the newly established Department of International Relations at the Igbinedion University, Okada, Edo State. The following year, he was appointed as a lecturer at his alma mater, the Department of History and Strategic Studies, University of Lagos and has continued to rise through the ranks until his appointment on August 1, 2020, as the head of the department. Aworawo is a Member of the following professional bodies: Historical Society of Nigeria, British Scholar Society, and Nigerian Society of International Affairs.

Beyond academia, Aworawo has served and serves in different public capacities. He is as a Consultant to the following organisations: Nigerian Foreign Service Academy, Presidential Amnesty Programme; and Nigerian Army College of Logistics, Lagos. He also served as a Consultant to ECOWAS and the Fredrich Ebert Foundation on the Conflict in Guinea-Bissau in 2018; and as a Rapporteur, Committee on the Drafting of a New Nigerian Foreign Policy in 2011. From 2002 to 2003, Aworawo was a Member of the editorial board of The Comet (Nigeria) Newspaper, Lagos. Aworawo is a frequent guest analyst and sought-after commentator on different socio-political affairs television programmes and newspaper medium in Nigeria.

== Selected works ==
- "National Interest and Foreign Policy: The Dynamics of Nigerian-British Relations, 1960-1999," Valahian Journal of Historical Studies 16 (2011): 53–72.
- "International Pressure and Domestic Politics: The Crisis of Democratic Values and Stability in Post-Independence Equatorial Guinea," Revista de Historia Actual 10, (2012): 43–54.
- "Foreign Policy and the Travails of Nigerian Migrants in Equatorial Guinea", Nigerian Journal of International Affairs 25, no. 2 (1999): 23–45
- "Backwards to the Future: Culture, Environmental Management and Sustainable Development in Nigeria since the mid-1970s", The Quint Journal 9, no. 2 (2017): 131–158
- "Decisive Thaw: The Changing Pattern of Relations between Nigeria and Equatorial Guinea, 1980–2005" Journal of International and Global Studies 1, no. 2: 89-109
- "Deprivation and Resistance: Environmental Crisis, Political Action and Conflict Resolution in the Niger Delta since the 1980s", Journal of International and Global Studies 4, no. 2 (2013): 52–70
- "The Road Not Taken: Political Action and the Crisis of Democratic Values and Stability in Post-Independence Equatorial Guinea", Critical Issues in Justice and Politics 5, no. 2 (2012): 71–88
- "Development Crisis and Ideological Shift: Africa’s Economic Policy in an Era Global Recession", African Journal of Governance and Development 1, no. 2 (2012): 13–28
- "Economic Policy and the Social Context of Africa’s Development: An Analysis of the Experiences of Nigeria and Botswana," Journal of Sustainable Development in Africa 14, no. 3 (2012): 111–126
- "Collision and Rapprochement: The Development of Nigerian-Gabonese Relations, 1960-1990," Journal of International Relations 8, no. 1 (2010): 54–73
- "The Social and Cultural Dimensions of Nigerian-Jamaican Relations, 1975–2000," ABIBISEM: Journal of Culture and Civilization 1, no.1 (2008): 50–70
