= Saïda Hossini =

Moroccan paleontologist

Saïda Hossini (born 1950) is a Moroccan palaeontologist, specialising in Cretaceous frogs of the Pleistocene.

== Career ==
Hossini teaches at the University of Moulay Ismail, Faculté des Sciences in Meknes. She studied for her doctoral research in Paris, researching anuran species of the late oligocene and the miocene in France. Her work in Morocco includes the examination of cave deposits and examined amphibian remains from the Thomas Quarry Site, near Casablanca. Hossini identified for the first time the presence of the genus Baleaphryne for the first time in Africa at the Jebel Irhoud ("Ocre" quarry) site in Morocco. She also investigated the faunal remains at the cave of That El Ghar (Tetuan), exploring palaeoenvironment of North Africa between the pleistocene and the holocene.

== New species ==
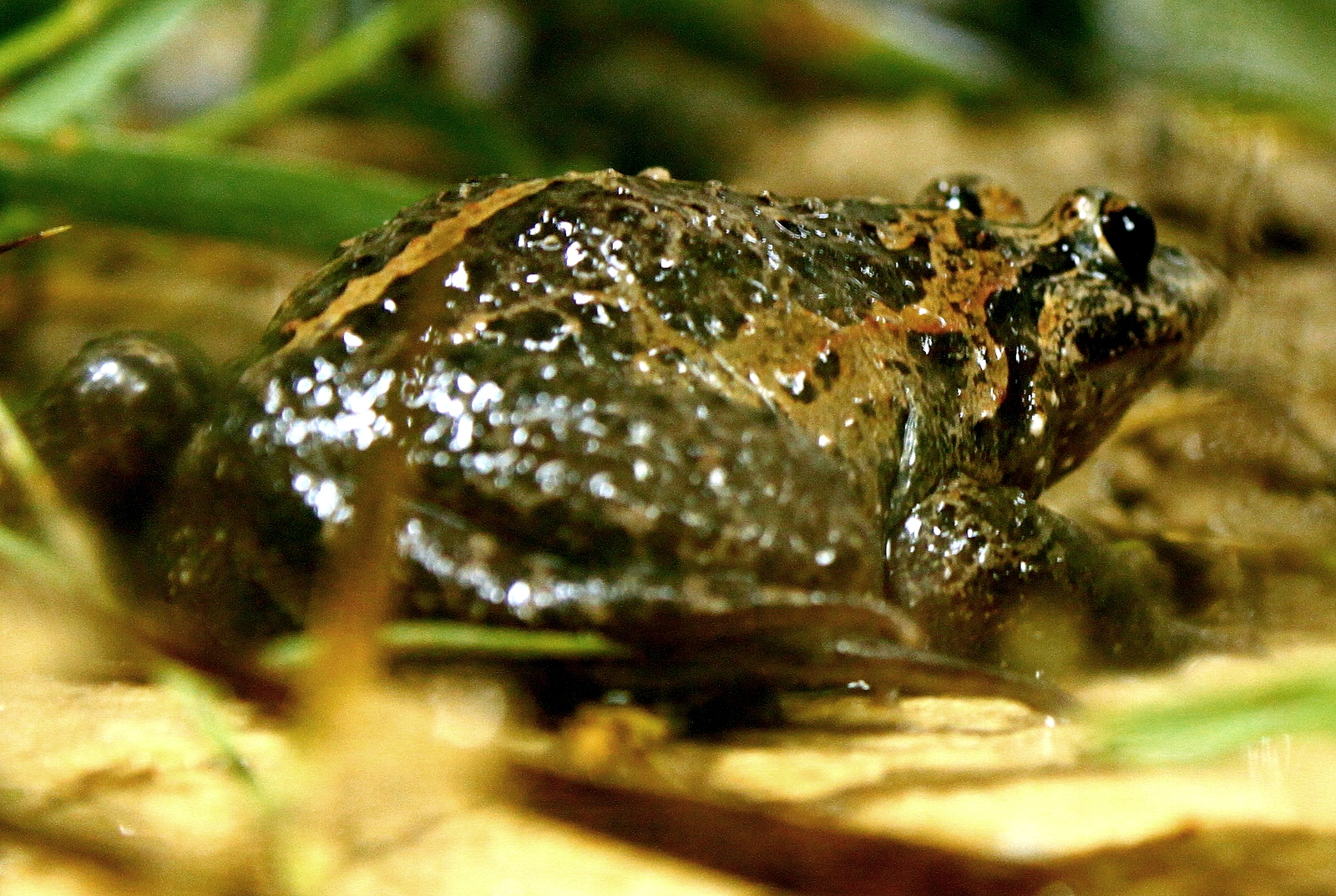
Hula painted frog or Latonia nigriventer is the only extant species in the Latonia genus and is the closest living relative to Latonia ragei

In 1993, Hossini was the person to describe a new species of frog, Latonia ragei. Evidence for the species came from the fossil record in three localities: Coderet, Laugnac and 'St Gerand-Le-Puy'. The discovery and identification of a Latonia mandible, led to the classification of this species as new to science. In other examples of ragei, Hossini worked on maxilla surface sculpturing to produce identification.

== Awards ==
In 2010, Hossini and her team of other French and Moroccan researchers won the Clio Prize. This was the archaeological research program on the first settlements of the Atlantic Coast in Morocco.

== Personal life ==
Hossini is known to be fluent in both Arabic and Berber. Hossini studied as a paleontologist under the doctoral advisory of Jean-Claude Rage.
