= Lilica Boal =

Cape Verdean historian and educator (1934–2024)

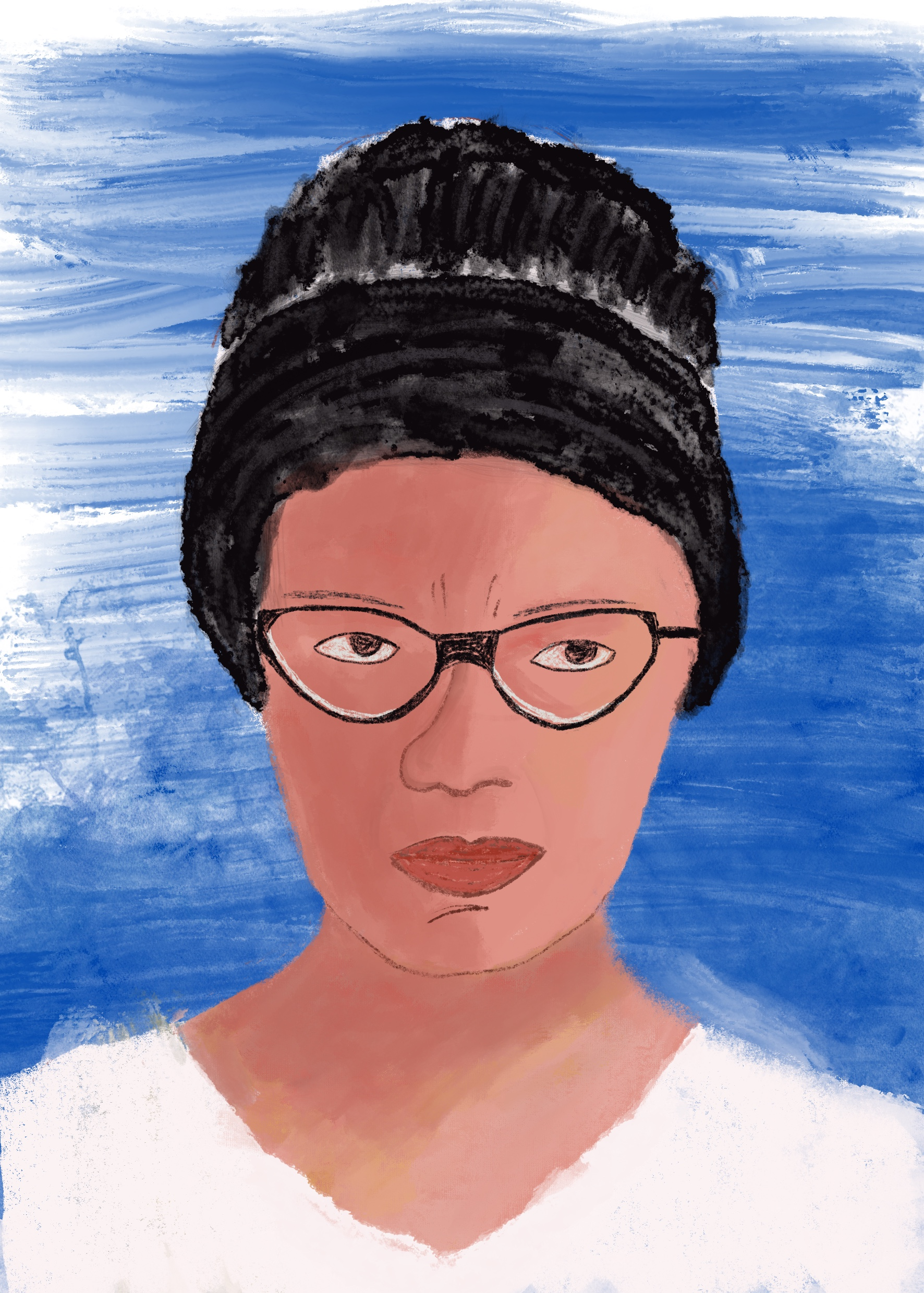
Portrait of Lilica Boal.

Maria da Luz Freire de Andrade (1934 – November 6, 2024), better known as Lilica Boal, was a historian, philosopher, educator, and anti-fascist activist in Cape Verde. She fought for the independence of Guinea-Bissau and Cape Verde, and against the Portuguese Estado Novo dictatorship.

As the only woman serving in the first National Assembly of Cape Verde, she became the country's first female lawmaker.

== Early life and education ==
Boal was born in 1934 in Tarrafal, Cape Verde, on the island of Santiago. Her parents were fairly well-off merchants: Dona Eulália Andrade, better known as Nha Beba, and José Freire Andrade, better known as Nho Papacho.

She lived in Tarrafal until she was 11 years old, when she left for the island of São Vicente to study at the Liceu Gil Eanes, now the Liceu Ludgero Lima. She later moved to Portugal, where she finished secondary school in Braga. She attended the University of Coimbra, where she studied history and philosophy.

After two years in Coimbra, she moved to Lisbon, where she enrolled in the history and philosophy program at the University of Lisbon. There, she began to frequent Casa dos Estudantes do Império, a meeting place for students from African colonies of Portugal. It was then that she began to identify herself with the liberation movement. The students discussed the situations in their different countries and what role they could play in the fight for freedom.

== Political career ==
=== "Flight to the fight" ===
In June 1961, Boal returned to Africa along with other African students in a "flight to the fight," as they called it, with the goal of fighting for independence for their countries. Their trip was clandestine and took them through Porto, San Sebastián (where they were imprisoned for 48 hours), France, and Germany before they finally arrived in Ghana.

Boal settled in Senegal, in Dakar, to work in the office of the African Party for the Independence of Guinea and Cape Verde. It was from there that she made contact with the community in Cape Verde to discuss and develop the possibility of fighting for independence in her home country. She also worked to treat the war wounded who arrived across the border via Ziguinchor.

=== Director of the Pilot School ===
Boal began traveling to Conakry, Guinea, to train teachers.

At the invitation of Amílcar Cabral, in 1969 she became the director of the Pilot School of the African Party for the Independence of Guinea and Cape Verde, which was launched in Conakry in 1965 with the goal of educating young fighters and war orphans.

Boal later said of Cabral, who was a significant African anti-colonial leader until his assassination in 1973, "Amílcar cared about the issue of gender. He said that women had to fight for their freedom. He chose women for all aspects of the struggle: education, health, information, logistics.

As the school's director, she took responsibility for developing new study materials, as the existing ones did not reflect the country's reality. Her research for this endeavor included consulting course materials from other countries, including Senegal, and adopting them for the local context.

At the school, she taught Portuguese, French, English, geography, and the history of Guinea and Cape Verde, with the goal of framing those countries' futures. She also oversaw the awarding of scholarships that allowed many of her students to continue their studies in Cuba, in the Soviet Union, in East Germany, and in Czechoslovakia. The school had strong international support from those countries as well as Sweden, France, and others. Students had to be prepared for any situation, so they were also instructed in how to handle weapons.

In this period, Boal joined the leadership of the Women's Democratic Union (UDEMU), the party's women's wing, taking responsibility for international relations. She participated in international women's conferences that dealt with the situation of women in Africa and the world.

From 1974 to 1979 she was the director of the party's Instituto Amizade in Guinea-Bissau, and she was later appointed to the No. 2 spot at the Ministry of Education, serving as director-general of coordination from 1979 until the end of 1980.

=== Return to Cape Verde ===
In 1980, after a military coup brought João Bernardo Vieira into power in Guinea-Bissau, she returned to Cape Verde and began working as inspector-general of education. She then worked at the Instituto Cabo-verdiano de Solidariedade until her retirement. She also became the first woman elected to the nascent National Assembly of Cape Verde.

She was one of the founders, in 1981, of the Organização das Mulheres de Cabo Verde, an organization that aimed to support women's autonomy. Boal handled the organization's international partnerships.

== Personal life, death, and legacy ==
At the University of Coimbra, she met Manuel Boal, an Angolan medical student and later a fellow freedom fighter. The couple married in 1958 and had two daughters, Sara and Baluka, who were raised in part by Lilica Boal's mother during the height of the liberation fight.

Lilica Boal died in 2024 at age 90, in Praia. She was buried in her hometown of Tarrafal. On her death, Cabo Verde President José Maria Neves called her "a woman of courage and vision, one of the pillars of our history." The Women's Organization of Cape Verde's Professional Training and Qualification Center in Tarrafal has been named in her honor since 2022.
