= Betty Wood =

British historian and academic (1945–2021)

Betty C. Wood
- Born: 23 February 1945; Melton Constable, Norfolk, England
- Died: 3 September 2021 (aged 76); Cambridge, Cambridgeshire, England
- Citizenship: United Kingdom

Academic work
- Discipline: History
- Sub-discipline: early American history; Atlantic history; history of slavery; social history; gender history
- Institutions: Girton College, Cambridge; Faculty of History, University of Cambridge

Betty C. Wood (23 February 1945 – 3 September 2021) was a British historian and academic, who specialised in early American history, Atlantic history, social history, and slavery in eighteenth and early nineteenth century. She was a Fellow of Girton College, Cambridge (1971–2011) and taught in the Faculty of History, University of Cambridge, rising to become Reader in American History.

== Biography ==
Wood was born on 23 February 1945 in Melton Constable, Norfolk, England. She was educated at grammar schools in Fakenham and Scunthorpe. She studied geography at the University of Keele, graduating with a Bachelor of Arts (BA) degree in 1967. She then studied social and economic history at the London School of Economics, graduating with a Master of Arts (MA) degree in 1968. In a move highly unusual at the time, she studied history at the University of Pennsylvania and completed her Doctor of Philosophy (PhD) degree in 1975. During the three years she lived in the United States, she experienced the race riots of the 1960s, the civil rights movement, and developed her interest in the early history of the United States and its racial complexities.

She was a Fellow of Girton College, Cambridge from 1971 until her retirement in 2011: the college awarded her a life fellowship, which she held until her death. She was additionally Director of Studies in history at Girton from 1974 to 1984. Having been a lecturer in the Faculty of History, University of Cambridge since the 1970s, she was made Reader in American History by the university in either 1995 or 1999. During her career, she acted as doctoral supervisor for 19 PhD students.

In 2019, at its 133rd annual meeting, Wood was made an Honorary Foreign Member of the American Historical Association.

Having had cancer, Wood died on 3 September 2021 at Addenbrooke's Hospital, Cambridge: she was 76 years old.

== Selected works ==
- Wood, Betty (1984). Slavery in colonial Georgia, 1730-1775. Athens: University of Georgia Press. ISBN 978-0820306872.
- Wood, Betty (1995). Women's work, men's work: the informal slave economies of lowcountry Georgia. Athens: University of Georgia Press. ISBN 9780820316673.
- Wood, Betty (1997). The origins of American slavery: freedom and bondage in the English colonies. New York: Hill and Wang. ISBN 978-0809074563.
- Frey, Sylvia R.; Wood, Betty (1998). Come shouting to Zion: African American Protestantism in the American South and British Caribbean to 1830. Chapel Hill: University of North Carolina Press. ISBN 9780807823750.
- Wood, Betty (2000). Gender, race, and rank in a revolutionary age: the Georgia lowcountry, 1750-1820. Athens: University of Georgia Press. ISBN 9780820321837.
- Wood, Betty; Lynn, Martin, eds. (2002). Travel, trade, and power in the Atlantic, 1765-1884. Cambridge: Cambridge University Press for the Royal Historical Society. ISBN 9780521823128.
- Wood, Betty (2005). Slavery in colonial America, 1619-1776. Lanham, Md.: Rowman & Littlefield Publishers. ISBN 0-7425-4418-4.
- Chirhart, Ann Short; Wood, Betty, eds. (2009). Georgia women: their lives and times. Volume 1. Athens: University of Georgia Press. ISBN 978-0820333373.
