= Mohamed El Aziz Ben Achour =

Tunisian historian

- Born: 5 January 1951 (age 75); La Marsa, Tunisia
- Education: Tunis University; The Sorbonne
- Occupation: Historian
- Political party: Democratic Constitutional Rally
- Awards: Officer of Order of Academic Palms; Knight of the Ordre National du Mérite

Mohamed El Aziz Ben Achour (Arabic: محمد العزيز بن عاشور) is a Tunisian politician and historian born on 5 January 1951; he specializes in urban, social and cultural history of modern Tunisia and the Islamic civilization. He was the Minister of Culture some time between 2004 and 2008, and later Director-General of the Arab League Educational, Cultural and Scientific Organization (ALECSO) some time between 2009 and 2013.

== Life ==
He was Director of Heritage Sciences at the National Heritage Institute and later Director-General of Institut supérieur d'histoire du mouvement national (French for "The Higher Institute of History of the National Movement") as well as Governor of Historic Site at Sidi Bou Said at the same time. He also served as Municipal Councillor for the Democratic Constitutional Rally in Tunis for some time between 1995 and 2000, and later became Deputy Mayor of Tunis until 2005.

In November 2004, he was appointed Minister of Culture in the First cabinet of Mohamed Ghannouchi and remained at the head of the ministry until August 2008. In December of the same year, he was elected Director-General of the Arab League Educational, Cultural and Scientific Organization for a four-year period that started on February 1, 2009.

== Education ==
Mohamed El Aziz belongs to the Ben Achour family, an ancient bourgeois family in Tunis which descends from Andalusia. He is the grandson of Sheikh Muhammad al-Tahir ibn Ashur, and the son of Abdelmalek Ben Achour and Radiya Al-Jaluli.

He obtained a master's degree in history from Tunis University, then a degree in scientific studies, followed by a Ph.D. in Islamic civilization in 1977, and another in humanities in 1986, all from the Sorbonne.

== Main publications ==
- Le musée du Bardo : hier et aujourd'hui, 1888-1988 (with Mounira Harbi-Riahi & Samia El Mechat), ed. Institut national d'archéologie et d'art, Tunis (1988).
- L'Habitat traditionnel dans les pays musulmans autour de la Méditerranée : l'héritage architectural (with Jacques Revault & Jean-Claude Garcin), ed. Institut français d'archéologie orientale, Paris (1988).
- Catégories de la société tunisoise dans la deuxième moitié du XIXe siècle, ed. Institut national d'archéologie et d'art, Tunis (1989).
- Les ulamâ à Tunis aux XVIIIe et XIXe siècles, ed. Institut national d'archéologie et d'art, Tunis (1991) (reissue ed. ANRT, Lille).
- La mosquée-université de la Zitouna. Le monument et les hommes, ed. CERES Publications, Tunis (1991)
- Les décorations tunisiennes d'époque husseïnite, ed. Sagittaire Publications, Tunis (1994)
- Les Arabes: du message à l'histoire (with André Miquel & Dominique Chevallier), ed. Fayard, Paris (1995) (ISBN 2-213-59330-2)
- Le Bardo, palais des beys de Tunis, ed. Sagittaire Publications, Tunis (2000)
- La cour du bey de Tunis, ed. Espace Diwan Publications, Tunis (2003)
- Zaouïas et confréries. Aspects de l'islam mystique dans l'histoire tunisienne, ed. Sagittaire Publications, Tunis (2004)
- L'Excès d'Orient. La notion de pouvoir dans le monde arabe, ed. Erick Bonnier Publications, Paris (2015)
- La Tunisie, la Méditerranée et l'Orient au miroir de l'histoire, ed. Leaders Publishing, Tunis (2020)
- Aux temps des émirs et des beys. Épisodes de l'histoire tunisienne, ed. Leaders Publishing, Tunis (2022)
- La Tunisie de jadis et de naguère : à la rencontre de l’Occident et de l’Orient, ed. Leaders Publishing, Tunis (2024)
- La médina au temps des pachas beys : architecture, société et culture, ed. Leaders Publishing, Tunis (2025).

== Distinctions ==
=== Awards ===
- 1980: Aga Khan Award for Architecture
- 2012: Crans Montana Forum Award
- 2012: Mediterranean Award for Cultural Heritage

=== Honours ===
- Grand Officer of the Order of the Republic (Tunisia)
- Commander of the Order of 7 November (Tunisia)
- Medal of the Islamic World Educational, Scientific and Cultural Organization (OIC)
- Knight of the Ordre National du Mérite (France)
- Officer of Order of Academic Palms (France)
- Commander of the Order of Arts and Letters (France)
