= Johann Gildemeister =

German orientalist (1812–1890)

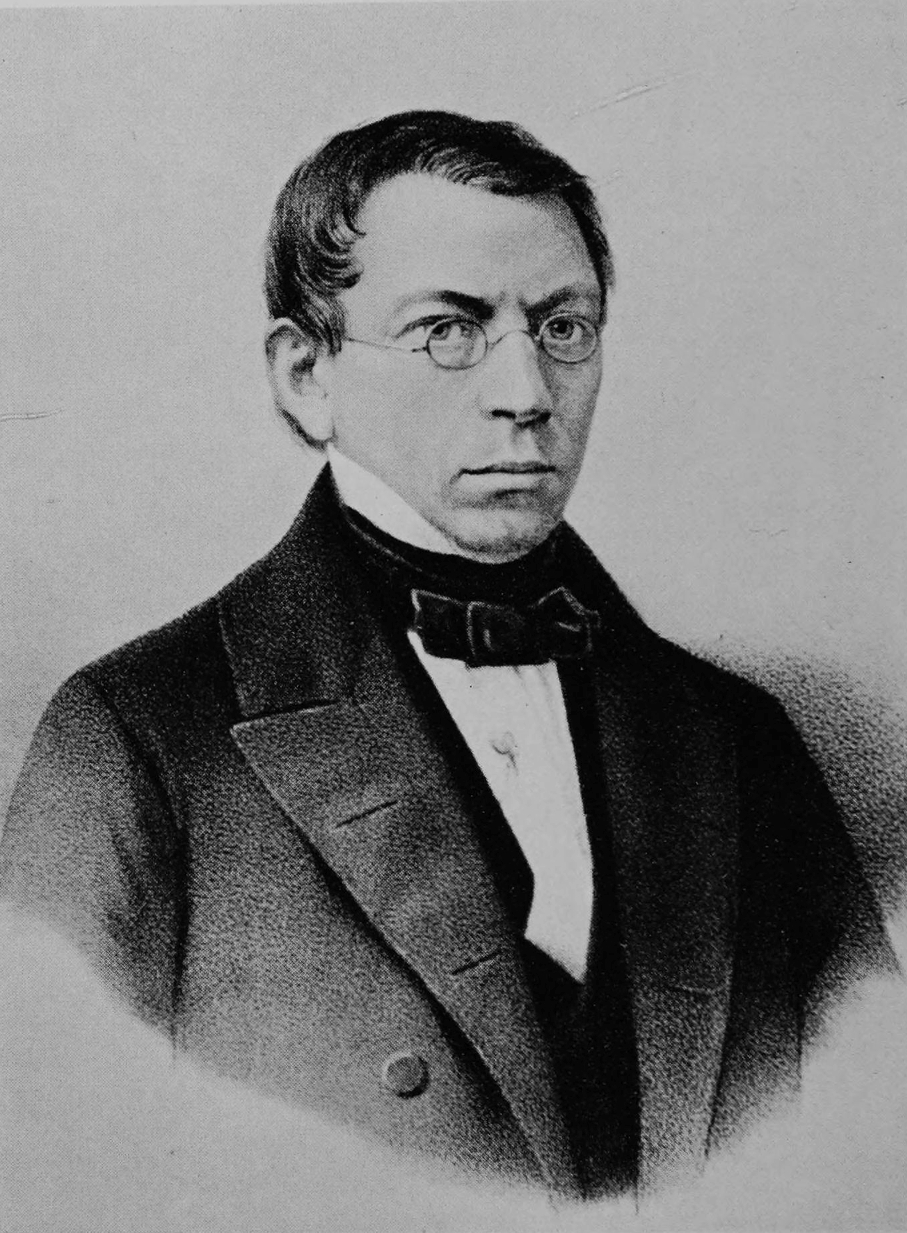

Johann Gildemeister (20 July 1812 – 11 March 1890) was a German Orientalist born in Kröpelin.

== Biography ==
He studied Oriental languages and theology at the Universities of Göttingen and Bonn and graduated from the latter institution in 1838. Following a study trip to Leiden and Paris, he became a lecturer at Bonn, where he taught classes in Sanskrit, Oriental languages and literature as well as Old Testament exegesis. Later on he served as an associate professor of Oriental languages (1844). In 1845 he relocated to the University of Marburg as a professor of theology and Oriental literature. In 1859 he returned to Bonn as a professor.

He died in Bonn (1890), at the age of 77.

== Works ==
With historian Heinrich von Sybel, he was the author of ''Der heilige Rock zu Trier und die zwanzig andern heiligen ungenähten Röcke, a controversial work that argued against the authenticity of the Holy Coat of Trier. Other noted publications by Gildemeister include:

- Dissertationis de rebus Indiae, quo modo in Arabum notitiam venerint, pars prior, quam una cum Masudii loco ad codd. Parisiens. fidem recensito. Baaden, Bonn 1838 (Dissertation) Digitalization
- Scriptorum Arabum de Rebus Indicis loci et opuscula inedita; ad codicum Parisinorum Leidanorum Gothanorum fidem, recensuit et illustravit Ioannes Gildemeister. Fasciculus primus. Bonn: König, 1838. [Facsimile scan at archive.org]
- Bibliothecae Sanskritae sive recensvs librorvm sanskritorvm hvcvsque typis vel lapide exscriptorvm critici specimen, Bonn (and others): König, 1847.
- Kalidasae Meghaduta et Çringaratilaka: ex recensione J. Gildemeisteri; additum est glossarium, Bonn: König, 1841.
- De Evangeliis in Arabicum e Simplici Syriaca translatis commentatio academica Ioannis Gildemeisteri, 1865.
- Über die in Bonn entdeckten neuen Fragmente des Macarius, 1867.

== Articles ==
- Gildemeister, J. (1882). "Des 'Abd al-Ghani al-Nabulsi reise von Damascus nacht Jerusalem". Zeitschrift der Deutschen Morgenländischen Gesellschaft. 36: 385-400.
- Gildemeister, J. (1884). "Mukaddasi". Zeitschrift des Deutschen Palästina-Vereins. 7: 143 –172, 215 – 230.
