= O. A. Akinyeye =

Nigerian history professor (born 1958)

Yomi Akinyeye
- Born: Olajompo Abayomi Akinyeye; 21 March 1958 (age 68); Idanre, Nigeria
- Children: 3

Academic background
- Education: University of Lagos, Nigeria
- Thesis: A Comparative Study of the Defence Policies of Britain and France in West Africa (1886-1945) (1991)
- Doctoral advisor: Prof. Akinjide Osuntokun

Academic work
- Discipline: Military history, international relations, regional integration
- Institutions: University of Lagos; Nigeria Defence Academy
- Notable students: David Aworawo

Olajompo Abayomi Akinyeye (born 21 March 1958 in Idanre, Nigeria) is a Nigerian professor of history at University of Lagos, Nigeria. His research and teaching interests are in the areas of military history, strategic studies, international relations and diplomacy, comparative foreign policy, and regional integration. He is a widely published author, with several monographs, and dozens of scholarly articles appearing in various edited volumes and high-impact academic journals.

== Background ==
Yomi Akinyeye was born on 21 March 1958 in Idanre in present-day Nigeria's Ondo State. He had his elementary schooling at the Methodist Primary School, Idanre; and Children's Boarding School, Osogbo. He then attended Methodist High School, Okitipupa and Government College, Ibadan, between 1972 and 1978. He proceeded to University of Lagos where he obtained his bachelor's, master's and doctoral degrees in history in 1981, 1985 and 1991 respectively. His doctoral thesis focused on a comparative study of British and French colonial defense policies in West Africa between 1886 and 1946. His proficiency in both English and French—in addition to Yoruba—languages was very valuable in for his doctoral research.

Upon completion of his bachelor's programme in 1981, he was engaged as a Teaching Assistant at the University of Lagos for his one-year national youth service. He also worked as a Lecturer II at the Nigerian Defence Academy, Kaduna from 1987 to 1990. He then secured appointment at his alma mater's Department of History as a Lecturer I in 1990. He rose steadily through the ranks to become a full Professor in 2005.

== Career ==
Akinyeye was the Head of the Department of History and Strategic Studies, University of Lagos from 2007 through 2010. He was the Dean of the university's Faculty of Arts from 2013 through 2015, and a Member of the University of Lagos Governing Council from 2012 to 2016. In 2008, he was a Visiting Professor at the University of Ibadan. Beyond the university, he is (since 2019) a Member of the Specialized Committee on the Humanities of the Nigerian National Order of Merit Award's Governing Board. Equally, he has held different positions within Nigeria's apex trade union for academics, the Academic Staff Union of Universities (ASUU). For instance, he was the Chairman of the Union's University of Lagos chapter from 2000 to 2005; the Union's National Liaison Officer from 2005 to 2007; and its Ibadan Zonal Coordinator from 2007 to 2010.

Akinyeye designed and introduced the Masters in Diplomacy and Strategic Studies (MDSS) programme into the Department/University. He has designed and taught different courses in the area of warfare and diplomacy, international relations, and strategy.

He belongs to different professional bodies including the Nigerian Academy of Letters, the Nigeria Society of International Affairs, the American Studies Association of Nigeria, the Foreign Policy Community of Nigeria, among others. He is a Fellow of the Historical Society of Nigeria (HSN), the country's pioneer academic association.

At different times, Akinyeye has served as a Consultant to UNESCO on its Management of Social Transformation Programme for West Africa, the AU on boundary issues, and ECOWAS on issues of regional integration and poverty eradication seminar series.

His current research projects explore: factors in the regional integration of Western Europe and West Africa; insurgency and counter-insurgency in Nigeria; West Africa's involvement in the Second World War's air warfare; as well as a social history of postal services in Nigeria, among others.

== Awards ==
- Bourse de Stage du le Gouverement Francaise, France, 1989
- British Council Research Fellowship Award, 1989
- Vilas Research Assistantship Award, University of Wisconsin, Madison, 1982
- Nigerian Federal Government Postgraduate Scholarship Award, 1982-83

== Selected publications ==
- Akinyeye, O. A. Guarding The Gateways: British and French Defence Policies in West Africa, 1886–1945 (Lagos: University of Lagos Press, 2003).
- Akinyeye, O. A. The Nation-State and the Challenges of Regional Integration in West Africa: The Case of Nigeria (Paris: Karthala, 2010)
- Akinyeye, O. A. "The Air Factor in West Africa's Colonial Defense: A Neglected Theme," Itinerario European Journal of Overseas History 25, no. 1 (2001): 9-21.
- Akinyeye, O. A. "German Threat and the Value of West Africa to France in the Interwar Years," Ife Journal of History 2, no. 1, (1995) 36–52.
- Akinyeye, O. A. Clothing Others While Naked: West Africa and Geopolitics, Inaugural Lecture Series (Lagos: University of Lagos, 2014).
