= Josefina Chantre =

Cape Verdean anti-colonialist and independence fighter

- Born: 1942 (age 83–84); Paúl, Santo Antão, Portuguese Cape Verde
- Other names: Zezinha Chantre

Josefina Chantre (born 1942, Paúl, Santo Antão, Portuguese Cape Verde) is a Cape Verdean woman who fought for the end of Portuguese colonialism and for the independence of Guinea-Bissau and Cape Verde. She was the President of Renascença Africana - Associação das Mulheres da África Ocidental (RAMAO-CV) and the founder of the Women's Organization of Cape Verde.

== Early life ==
Josefina Chantre, also known as Zezinha Chantre, was born in Paúl (Santo Antão Island), in 1942, into a family of ten siblings.

Chantre studied in São Vicente and later, in the 1960s, went to Portugal on a scholarship from the Overseas Minister, Adriano Moreira, where she attended a technical course in social services.

== Activism ==
Chantre moved to Angola where she worked at the Angolan Social Assistance Institute. As a worker at this institute, Josefina worked in musseques and slums in various provinces and says that it was at this time that she began to feel discrimination and social injustice, which made her become more politically aware. After two years, she moved to Luanda where she enrolled at the Luanda Higher Institute of Social Service. Later, she moved to Portugal and studied at the Higher School of Social Service in Lisbon where she met young people who were already fighting for the independence of the colonies and were members of the African resistance.

In 1970, Chantre went to Sweden with her then boyfriend, Mozambican Joaquim Ribeiro Carvalho, a Frelimo activist and then to Algiers with the aim of going to Tanzania, the armed trench of the struggle in Mozambique. Although she was prevented from going, and already familiar with PAIGC politics, she moved to Conakry to help with the national liberation movements. In Conakry, she worked in Amílcar Cabral's secretariat and was responsible for communication, working on updating the newspaper Libertação and doing radio work in Barvalento Creole.

After Amílcar Cabral's death, Chantre was sent with Inácio Semedo, also a member of the PAIGC, to Algeria, a country that had provided logistical support in the armed struggle, in the training of PAIGC comrades and in support of the negotiations in London, since there was a need to explain the reasons for Amílcar Cabral's death. Chantre took part in the national liberation struggle, and after Cape Verde's independence, she dedicated her life to the struggle for women's equality in Cape Verde, where she moved in 1980. She was also a member of the PAIGC.

According to Chantre, "Cape Verdean women were colonized twice: first they were exploited by the colonialist and then by the man himself". At the beginning of the construction of an independent Cape Verde, the party considered that development should be global, but Josefina considered this to be wrong, since more than half of the population was made up of women and it was at this juncture that the first women's organization in Cape Verde was born, the Women's Organization of Cape Verde. The aim of the organization was to develop policies and projects for gender equality, with a view to building a country full of equality. Chantre also advocates strengthening education and training so that Cape Verdean women, the majority of whom work in the informal market, have access to decent jobs and fair wages. Among other projects, she developed the maternal and child protection and family planning program known as PMI-PF and implemented the entire network of kindergartens in Cape Verde.

Chantre is also an activist for making more information available about the national liberation struggle, especially to raise awareness among young people and to demonstrate the contribution of women to the liberation of Guinea-Bissau and Cape Verde.

== Personal life ==
Chantre was married to Honório Chantre, a fellow Cape Verdean member of the struggle for the liberation of the colonies.
