= Permanent Representative of Liberia to the United Nations =

Permanent Representative of the Republic of Liberia
- Flag of the United Nations
- Incumbent; Sarah Safyn Fyneah since 2023
- Inaugural holder: Charles D. B. King
- Formation: 1949
- Website: Permanent Mission site

This is a list of the Permanent Representatives of the Republic of Liberia to the United Nations. The current office holder is Sarah Safyn Fyneah, since 13 February 2023.

== List ==
№	Permanent Representative	Years served	United Nations Secretary-General
1	Charles D. B. King	1949-51	Trygve Lie
2	Richard L. L. Bright	1952-53	Trygve Lie
2	Richard L. L. Bright	1953-55	Dag Hammarskjöld
3	Charles T. O. King	1955-60	Dag Hammarskjöld
4	Nathan Barnes	1960-61	Dag Hammarskjöld
4	Nathan Barnes	1961-72	U Thant
4	Nathan Barnes	1972-75	Kurt Waldheim
5	Angie Brooks Randolph	1975-78	Kurt Waldheim
6	David M. Thomas	1978-79	Kurt Waldheim
7	Winston Tubman	1979-81	Kurt Waldheim
8	Abeodu Bowen Jones	1981-82	Kurt Waldheim
8	Abeodu Bowen Jones	1982-84	Javier Pérez de Cuéllar
9	Sylvester Jarrett	1985-90	Javier Pérez de Cuéllar
10	William V. S. Bull	1990-92	Javier Pérez de Cuéllar
10	William V. S. Bull	1992-97	Boutros Boutros-Ghali
10	William V. S. Bull	1997-98	Kofi Annan
11	Nah Dukuly-Torbert	1999-2001	Kofi Annan
12	Lami Kawah	2001-2006	Kofi Annan
13	Nathaniel Barnes	2006-2007	Kofi Annan
13	Nathaniel Barnes	2007-2008	Ban Ki-moon
14	Marjon Kamara	2009-?	Ban Ki-moon
	Dee-Maxwell Saah Kemaya	2018-2022	António Guterres
	Sarah Safyn Fyneah	2023-present	António Guterres

== See also ==
- Foreign relations of Liberia
