= Women's Organization of Cape Verde =

- Formation: March 27, 1981; 45 years ago
- Founder: Josefina Chantre, Paula Fortes
- Type: NGO, Nonprofit
- Location: Cape Verde
- Fields: Women's rights
- Website: https://www.omcv.org.cv

Facilities of the Cape Verde Women's Organization in Tarrafal

The Women's Organization of Cape Verde (also known as OMCV) is a Cape Verdean non-governmental organization dedicated to defending women's rights and promoting gender equality. It is recognized as the first feminist association in the country. Among its founders are women like Josefina Chantre and Paula Fortes.

Although it began its activity years earlier, the association was officially founded on March 27, 1981, the date that came to mark Cape Verdean Women's Day. The OMCV began its activity as part of the African Party for the Independence of Cape Verde (PAICV) movement. With the support of the government in power at the time, the OMCV was fundamental for the inclusion of women's rights in legislative work plans, being seen as a catalyst for the Family Code and the Abortion Decriminalization Law, approved in the 1980s. Furthermore, it was linked to the implementation of several social development policies, such as the maternal and child protection program and family planning, as well as the implementation of the network of kindergartens in the archipelago.
