= Obi Iwuagwu =

Nigerian professor of history

Obichere Chilaka Iwuagwu
- Born: January 16, 1965 (age 61); Obohia, Ahiazu Mbaise, Nigeria
- Known for: Nation building, food systems, African development policy

Academic background
- Education: Imo State University; University of Lagos

Academic work
- Institutions: University of Lagos
- Notable works: Topics in Igbo Economic History (2008); Nation Building in Africa (2021)

Obichere Chilaka Iwuagwu (born 16 January 1965, in Obohia, Ahiazu Mbaise) is a Nigerian professor of economic history, development studies and public policy at the University of Lagos. His research interests cover topics like economic history, development economics and sustainable development, public policy and nation building, and food systems. Iwuagwu is the Nigerian director of the Confucius Institute at the University of Lagos, and the immediate past deputy director of the university's Institute of African and Diaspora Studies.

== Education ==
After completing his secondary education at Obizi High School, Mbaise in 1981; Iwuagwu proceeded to Imo State University where he earned his bachelor's degree in history in 1988. He then entered the University of Lagos where he received his master's degree and PhD. in history in 1992 and 1998 respectively.

== Career ==
Iwuagwu joined the faculty at the Department of History and Strategic Studies of the University of Lagos in 2005 as a Lecturer II. He rose through the ranks until becoming a full professor in 2020. In 2012, Iwuagwu was a Visiting Scholar at Soochow University, Suzhou in China. He was also a Visiting Scholar at the Beijing Institute of Technology, China in 2015.

== Selected publications ==
Iwuagwu, Obi, Ed. (2021), Nation Building in Africa: Issues, Challenges and Emerging Trends, University of Lagos Press & Bookshop Ltd.

Iwuagwu, Obi (2008). Topics in Igbo Economic History. First Academic Publishers. ISBN 978-978-37266-9-7.

University of Lagos, Nigeria; Iwuagwu, Obi (2020-08-17). "Development albatross: a historical analysis of Nigeria's economic development planning experience, 1960 – 2015" (PDF). Kampala International University Interdisciplinary Journal of Humanities and Social Sciences. 1 (2): 335–352. doi:10.59568/KIJHUS-2020-1-2-22.

Iwuagwu, Obi (2012). "The spread of cassava (manioc) in Igboland, south-east Nigeria: a reappraisal of the evidence". The Agricultural History Review. 60 (1): 60–76. ISSN 0002-1490. JSTOR 23317131.

Iwuagwu, Obi (2009). "Nigeria and the Challenge of Industrial Development: The New Cluster Strategy". African Economic History. 37 (1): 151–180. ISSN 2163-9108.

Iwuagwu, Obi (2009), “The Politics of Infrastructure Development in Rural South Eastern Nigeria, 1946 – 1976”, Uzu: Journal of History and International Studies, 11 (1), 111–123.

Iwuagwu, Obi (2006). "Rural development in Eastern Nigeria: An assessment of colonial and post colonial development plans in the former Owerri Province, 1946 - 1976". Lagos Historical Review. 6: 118–132. doi:10.4314/lhr.v6i1.32549. ISSN 1596-5031.
