= Fransjohan Pretorius =

South African historian of the Second Boer War

- Born: January 25, 1949 (age 77); Johannesburg, South Africa
- Occupations: Historian, emeritus professor
- Years active: 1989 - 2014 (- 2022)
- Spouse: Laurette Pretorius
- Awards: Stals Prize (1998); Jan H Marais Prize (2019)

Academic background
- Education: University of Pretoria, Leiden University, University of South Africa
- Thesis: (1988)

Academic work
- Institutions: University of Pretoria
- Main interests: Second Anglo-Boer War (1899-1902)
- Notable works: The Hall handbook of the Anglo-Boer War, 1899-1902 (1999, with Darrell Hall and Gilbert Torlage), A history of South Africa : from the distant past to the present day (2014), and Scorched earth (2017)

Fransjohan Pretorius (born January 25, 1949, in Johannesburg, South Africa) is a South African historian and professor emeritus of History at the University of Pretoria. His main field is the history of the Second Anglo-Boer War (1899–1902), to which he contributed many scholarly books and articles, both as an author and editor. His 1999 book, Life on Commando during the Anglo-Boer War 1899-1902, was runner-up for the Sunday Times Alan Paton Award. The Afrikaans edition won three major awards. He received the Stals Prize from the Suid-Afrikaanse Akademie vir Wetenskap en Kuns (South African Academy for Arts and Science) in 1998, and is a former editor of 'Historia', the journal of the South African Historical Association.

== Education and career ==
Pretorius matriculated at the Afrikaanse Hoër Seunskool (Affies). He studied history at the University of Pretoria (UP) and so is a Tukkie (derived from Transvaalse Universiteitskollege, the original name of the University of Pretoria). He continued his studies at Leiden University and obtained a PhD in history at the University of South Africa (UNISA) in 1989. He was lecturer in the Department of Historical and Heritage Studies from 1989 until his retirement in 2014 at the University of Pretoria.

Pretorius studied history at the University of Pretoria (UP) and so is a Tukkie (derived from Transvaalse Universiteitskollege, the original name of the University of Pretoria). He continued his studies at Leiden University and obtained a PhD in history at the University of South Africa (UNISA) in 1989. He was lecturer in the Department of Historical and Heritage Studies from 1989 until his retirement in 2014 at the University of Pretoria.

== Awards ==
In 1998 Pretorius received the Stals Prize for Cultural History from the Suid-Afrikaanse Akademie vir Wetenskap en Kuns (SAAWK, South African Academy of Science and Art) and in 2001 the Prestige Prize from the Federasie van Afrikaanse Kultuurvereniginge (FAK, Federation of Afrikaans Cultural Associations). In 2019, he was awarded the annual Jan H. Marais Prize for Outstanding Contribution to Afrikaans as an academic language.

== Personal life ==
Pretorius is married to Laurette Pretorius, a computer science professor emeritus at the University of South Africa. They have three children, Laurette, Nicolaas and Hermann.

== Publications ==
Pretorius' publications include:

=== In English ===
- 1999 – Pretorius, F. (1999). Life on commando during the AngloBoer War, 1899-1902. Cape Town: Human & Rousseau. ISBN 9780798138086. OCLC 606262443. 479 pages.
- 1999 – Hall, Darrell; Pretorius, F.; Torlage, Gilbert (1999). The Hall handbook of the Anglo-Boer War, 1899-1902. Pietermaritzburg: University of Natal Press. ISBN 9780869809433. OCLC 43789807.
- 2001 – Pretorius, F., ed. (2017). Scorched earth (2e ed.). Cape Town: Tafelberg. ISBN 9780624079675. OCLC 999307131.
- 2001 – Pretorius, F. (2001). The great escape of the Boer Pimpernel Christiaan de Wet. Pietermaritzburg: University of Natal Press. ISBN 9780869809945. OCLC 47896459.
- 2009 – Pretorius, Fransjohan (2009). Historical dictionary of the Anglo-Boer War. Lanham, Maryland, USA: Scarecrow Press. ISBN 9780810860919. OCLC 267053121.
- 2014 – Pretorius, F., ed. (2014). A history of South Africa : from the distant past to the present day. Pretoria [South Africa]: Protea Book House. OCLC 903246390. 712 pages.
- 2023 – Joubert, Anton; Pretorius, F. (2023). Jan Smuts 1870-1950 : a photobiography. Pretoria: Protea Book House. ISBN 9781485313847. OCLC 1372393402.

=== In Afrikaans ===
- 1991 – Pretorius, F. (1991). Kommandolewe tydens die Anglo-Boereoorlog, 1899-1902 (in Afrikaans). Kaapstad: Human & Rousseau. ISBN 9780798127790. OCLC 29362270.
- 1999 – Pretorius, F. (1999). 'N Oorlog om by stil te staan : die Anglo-Boereoorlog, 1899-1902 (in Afrikaans). Pretoria: SA Scientific Publications. OCLC 45964225.
- 2001 – Pretorius, F.; Schaafsma, Jan (2001). Verskroeide Aarde (in Afrikaans). Kaapstad: Human & Rousseau. ISBN 9780798141918. OCLC 47896441.
- 2007 – Pretorius, F. (2007). De la Rey : die leeu van Wes-Transvaal (in Afrikaans) (2e ed.). Pretoria: Protea Boekhuis. ISBN 9781869191764. OCLC 157010033.
- 2012 – Pretorius, F., ed. (2012). Geskiedenis van Suid-Afrika : van voortye tot vandag (in Afrikaans). Kaapstad: Tafelberg. ISBN 9780624054665. OCLC 806270649.
- 2020 – Pretorius, F. (2020). Terugblik : 80 sketse uit 'n ryk verlede (in Afrikaans). Pretoria: Protea Boekhuis. ISBN 9781485310983. OCLC 1182562073.
