= Bukar Usman =

Nigerian folklorist

- Born: 10 December 1942 (age 83); Borno State
- Education: Ahmadu Bello University Zaria

Bukar Usman (born 10 December 1942) is a Nigerian folklorist and historian. His interest includes topics like history, folktales and political commentary.

== Early life and education ==
Bukar Usman was born in Biu in Borno State in Nigeria. His early school was Qur'an education in Biu Local Government of Borno State then proceeded to secondary school in the same place in 1951. He went to Kings College, Lagos and proceeded to Ahmadu Bello University, Zaria, where he studied history.

== Publications ==
- Press policy and responsibility 1998
- God and Ancestors: Mythic Tales of Nigeria
- The Bride without scars
