= Abdool Cader Kalla =

Indo-Mauritian academic

- Born: 17 January 1941 (age 85); Rose Hill, British Mauritius
- Occupations: Academic; geographer; historian
- Known for: Contributions to academia and public service in Mauritius

Academic work
- Discipline: Geography; education
- Institutions: Mauritius Institute of Education, Independent Broadcasting Authority
- Main interests: Didactics; geography; intercultural education; history

Abdool Cader Kalla, also known by his pen name A.C. Kalla, is an Indo-Mauritian educator, geographer, and historian known for his contributions to academia and involvement in educational and cultural initiatives in Mauritius. With studies in geography and education, Kalla has made strides in promoting intercultural understanding, environmental awareness, and historical scholarship.

== Personal life ==
Abdool Cader Kalla was born in Rose Hill, Mauritius on January 17, 1941. He comes from an Indo-Mauritian Muslim heritage. His ancestors migrated from Gujarat, India in the 19th century to Mauritius during British rule.

== Career ==
Abdool Cader Kalla served as an associate professor of didactics and geography at the Mauritius Institute of Education (MIE), where he also held the position of deputy director. His expertise extended to the Geography of Health, an area of study in which he demonstrated a keen interest. During his tenure at the MIE, Kalla authored the environmental chapter of educational materials and co-directed the Teachers and Intercultural Education initiative, emphasizing the importance of multiculturalism and sensitization in educational practices.

In addition to being a professor, in the 1980s, Kalla served as vice-president of the National Remuneration Board (NRB), which set salary guidelines for the private sector. Ivan Collendaveloo led the body and was followed by the late Ewam Juggernauth.

Beyond his academic endeavors, Kalla was actively involved in shaping broadcasting policies in Mauritius. He assumed the role of President of the Independent Broadcasting Authority (IBA), succeeding Ashok Radhakissoon in 2004.

In addition to his academic and administrative roles, Kalla has also been recognized for his contributions to cultural heritage. He has served as the chairman of the Mauritius Museums Council.

== Contributions ==
As a historian, Kalla has delved into the complexities of Mauritius' colonial past, particularly focusing on the evolution of the Muslim community during both French and British colonial rule. His analyses are intended to provide insights into the socio-cultural dynamics that have shaped Mauritius over the centuries and contribute to a better understanding.

== Publications ==
Papers published on Academia:

- Kalla, Abdool Cader (1993). "The inequalities of morbidity and mortality in Mauritius—its ethic and geographic dimension". Social Science & Medicine. 36 (10): 1273–1283. doi:10.1016/0277-9536(93)90217-R. PMID 8511612.
- Kalla, Abdool Cader (1995). "Health transition in Mauritius: characteristics and trends". Health & Place. 1 (4): 227–234. doi:10.1016/1353-8292(95)00031-3.
- Kalla, Abdool Cader (2000). "Historical Geographer". Globalisation and South-West Indian Ocean.
- Kalla, Abdool Cader. "Years-the advent of Qadianism in Mauritius".
- Kalla, Abdool Cader. "Tom Jenkins in Mauritius".
- Kalla, Abdool Cader. "G.M.D Atchia: A Social Activist in Colonial Mauritius".
- Kalla, Abdool Cader. "The Atchias of Rosehill(Mauritius)".
- Kalla, Abdool Cader. "The career of Rev. Jean Lebrun (1814-1865) : Missionary Education and the Fashioning of the 'gens de couleur' in Mauritius".
- Kalla, Abdool Cader. "Heritage Reclaimed".
- Kalla, Abdool Cader. "Gujarati Merchants in Mauritius .c 1830-1900".
- Kalla, Abdool Cader. "Kem Choo-The Gujarati Connection: Merchants, Traders, Entrepreneurs".
- Kalla, Abdool Cader. "From Barbodhan to Belle Rose- The settlement of a small Gujarati Community In Mauritius ( 1861- 1900)".
- Kalla, Abdool Cader. "Gandhiji's hosts in Mauritius".
- Kalla, Abdool Cader. "The Rose Hill Soonnee Musjid(1863-1913) in colonial Mauritius".
- Kalla, Abdool Cader. "Muharram Performances in Mauritius 1780-2010".
