= Silas Molema =

Dr Silas Modiri Molema
- Born: Silas Modiri Molema c. 1891; Mafeking, South Africa
- Died: 13 August 1965 (aged 73–74); Mafeking

Dr Silas Modiri Molema (c. 1891 – 13 August 1965) was a South African doctor, politician, activist, and historian.

== Life ==
Silas Modiri Molema was born around 1891 in Mafeking, South Africa. His father was an important Barolong tribal chief, Silas Thelensho Molema. Molema began his education in South Africa, before moving to Europe in 1914. He graduated with a degree in medicine from the University of Glasgow in 1919, going on to practice medicine at the Hume Street Hospital in Dublin, Ireland. While in Glasgow, he published his most important work dedicated to the origin and history of the Bantu. Molema returned to South Africa in 1921 he worked as a doctor in his home town of Mafikeng.

In the 1940s he joined the African National Congress, and in December 1949 he was elected national secretary of the party. He later served as treasurer.

In 1952, during the preparations for the festival celebrating the tricentenary of the landing of Jan van Riebeeck, he delivered a famous speech in front of the audience of the South African Indian Council inviting those present to oppose the celebration by the white minority of the colonial past.

He was part of the Legislative Council, the transitional political body established by the British colonial authority during the process that led to the independence of South Africa. He had a prominent role in the administrative bodies of the Protectorate of Bechuanaland, taking part in the independence process resulting in the foundation of the Republic of Botswana.

Molema married Anna Moshoela around 1927. He later re-married, to Lucretia. He died on 13 August 1965.

== Publications ==
- The Bantu Past and Present: An Ethnographical and Historical Study of the Native Races of South Africa, Green, Edinburgh 1920 ( ISBN 9789353860929 - reprint 2019)
- Chief Moroka: His Life, His Country and His People, Methodist Publishing House, Cape Town, 1951
- Montshiwa 1815-1896: BaRolong Chief and Patriot, Struik, Cape Town, 1966
