= Muhammad Al Barka =

Moroccan writer and historian

- Born: 1971 (age 54–55); Meknes, Morocco

Muhammad Al Barka (Arabic: محمد البركة) (1971) is a Moroccan writer and historian born in Meknes, Morocco. He graduated from the department of History, college of humanities, Moulay Ismail University in Meknes, 1996. He received a completion of lessons certificate in Medieval History from the college of humanities, Sidi Mohamed Ben Abdellah University in Fez, 1997. From the same university, he also received his PhD in history, 2002, and his thesis was: ‘Almoravid dynasty’s contribution to the study of the Diwaniya writing system’. He received a university certificate of eligibility in History, 2010, for a study titled: ‘The features of the reference structure for the Almoravid dynasty, origins and chapters’.

== Career ==
Muhammad Al Barka worked as a professor of history and civilization at the Poly disciplinary College, Sidi Mohamed Ben Abdellah University in Taza. Then, he became a member of the Research Laboratory in Moroccan-Mediterranean Cultural Relations in the same college. Moreover, he became a member of the Moroccan Association for Historical Research. After that, he was chosen as Vice President of the local office of the National Union for Higher Education, and participated in many national and international seminars on history.

== Works ==
Muhammad Al Barka wrote a lot in the fields of history, civilization and heritage. Some of his works are:

- Almoravid dynasty (features of the diwaniyah writing system) (Original title: Al dawla al morabitiya (malameh nitham al kitaba al diwaniyah), 2008, Dar Africa Al Sharq.
- The Jurisprudence of History according to Dr. Fareed Al Ansari - Concept, Approach and Issues (Original title: Fiqh al tareekh end Al doctor Fareed Al Ansari – Al mafhoom wa al manhaj wa al qadaiya), 2011.
- The Jurisprudence of Da’wah according to Dr. Fareed Al Ansari (Reading in the Innate Project from the Qur’anic Rooting to Urban Empowerment) (Original title: Fiqh al da’wa end Al doctor Fareed Al Ansari – Qira’a fi mashrooa al fitriya min al ta’seel al qur’ani ila al tamkeen al omrani), 2012, Dar Al Salaam for printing, publishing, distribution and translation.
- Judicial reform projects in the Islamic West between the two centuries (6 AH - 8 AH / 12 AD - 14 AD) (Original title: Masharee’ islah al qada’ al gharbi al islami ma bain al qarnine (6 AH - 8 AH / 12 AD - 14 AD)), 2015, Dar Africa al Sharq.
- The Royal Politics of Lisan Al Din Bin Al Khateeb through his message on the conditions of state servants and their destinies (Original title: Al syasa al sultaniya end Lisan Al Din Bin Al Khateeb men khilal risalatoh fi ahwal khidmat al dawla wa masa’irohom), 2015, Dar Africa al Sharq.
