= Raphaël Nzabakomada-Yakoma =

Central African writer and historian(1944–1985

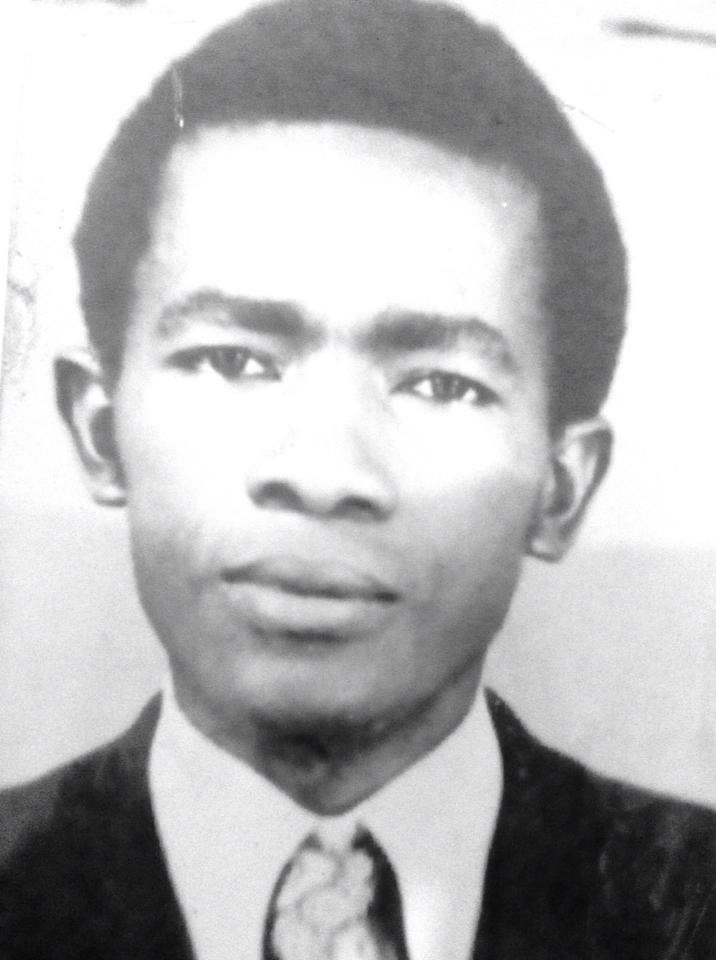
- Born: 1944; Baboua, Ubangi-Shari, French Equatorial Africa
- Died: 1985 (aged 40–41); Bangui, Central African Republic
- Resting place: Bimon (near Mbaïki), Lobaye, Central African Republic
- Occupations: Writer; historian; academic

Academic background
- Education: MAT, Université de Paris X, 1972; PhD, Université Paris Diderot, 1975
- Thesis: La Guerre de Kongo-Wara, 1928-1931 : un chapitre de la résistance anticoloniale en Afrique équatoriale (1975)
- Doctoral advisor: Catherine Coquery-Vidrovitch

Academic work
- Discipline: History
- Sub-discipline: History of the Central African Republic; Kongo-Wara rebellion
- Institutions: University of Bangui (1972–1979, 1982–1985)
- Language: French
- Notable works: ″L'Afrique centrale insurgée : la guerre du Kongo-Wara, 1928-1930″ (1986)

Raphaël Nzabakomada-Yakoma (1944–1985) was a Central African writer, historian and academic, known for his work on the Kongo-Wara rebellion. In 1975, Nzabakomada-Yakoma joined MESEN and was a former collaborator of the Bokassa regime until his exile in April 1979.

== Early life and education ==
Raphaël Nzabakomada-Yakoma was born in 1944 in Baboua, Ubangi-Shari, French Equatorial Africa (present-day Central African Republic). Nzabakomada-Yakoma spoke Sango and French.

In 1972, Nzabakomada-Yakoma graduated from the then Université de Paris X with a Master's in Teaching. In 1975, Nzabakomada-Yakoma was awarded a PhD in History from the Université Paris Diderot. According to Jean-Paul Ngoupandé, Nzabakomada-Yakoma was the first to be awarded a History PhD focused on the history of the Central African Republic. The historian Catherine Coquery-Vidrovitch was Nzabakomada-Yakoma's doctoral advisor.

As a student Nzabakomada-Yakoma was a member and vice-president of the Association nationale des étudiants centrafricains (UNECA), a section of the Black African Students Federation in France. During the 1969 UNECA delegation to Bangui, Nzabakomada-Yakoma narrowly avoided arrest during a crackdown on students by Jean-Bédel Bokassa following Alexandre Banza's failed coup d'état.

== Career ==
Upon the completion of his PhD in 1975, Nzabakomada-Yakoma joined MESEN. Becoming part of Bokassa's inner circle, Nzabakomada-Yakoma was appointed by Bokassa to the ″Bureau Politique de MESAN″.

From 1972 – 1982 Nzabakomada-Yakoma was a lecturer at the University of Bangui. In 1976, Nzabakomada-Yakoma was appointed the Dean of the Faculty of Literature and Human Sciences. Following the 1979 student uprisings, and the subsequent massacre of students in Bangui, in early April Nzabakomada-Yakoma was arrested and dismissed from his Deanship by Bokassa. Nzabakomada-Yakoma fled to the city of Zongo in the Democratic Republic of Congo. Nzabakomada-Yakoma remained in exile until Bokassa was overthrown in the 1979 Central African coup d’état.

Returning to the University of Bangui in 1982, Nzabakomada-Yakoma was the Principal of the Department of History and Conference Master until his death in 1985. In late 1985, Nzabakomada-Yakoma died at the Centre national hospitalier universitaire de Bangui following an illness. Nzabakomada-Yakoma is buried in the village of Bimon, near Mbaïki.

== Legacy ==
In 1986, Nzabakomada-Yakoma's doctoral thesis was posthumously published by Editions L'Harmattan. Retitled as ″L'Afrique centrale insurgée : la guerre du Kongo-Wara, 1928-1930″, the publication is considered one of the most complete studies of the Kongo-Wara rebellion.

== Publications ==
- Nzabakomada-Yakoma, Raphaël (1986). L'Afrique centrale insurgée : la guerre du Kongo-Wara, 1928-1930. Paris: Editions L'Harmattan. ISBN 2-85802-650-5.

=== Unpublished theses ===
- Nzabakomada-Yakoma, Raphaël (1972). Le Coton en République Centrafricaine, 1920-1964 : Une contribution à l'histoire économique et sociale de la R.C.A. Nanterre: Université de Paris X. Master's thesis.
- Nzabakomada-Yakoma, Raphaël (1975). La Guerre de Kongo-Wara, 1928-1931 : un chapitre de la résistance anticoloniale en Afrique équatoriale. Paris: Université Paris Diderot. Ph.D. thesis.

== See also ==
- Kongo-Wara rebellion
- 1979 Ngaragba Prison massacre
