= Ngwabi Bhebhe =

Zimbabwean academic

Ngwabi Bhebhe was a Zimbabwean historian and the first Vice-Chancellor of the Midlands State University. He served as the Vice chancellor for Midlands State University from 1999 to 2016. President Mnangagwa together with the late Vice President and national hero Cde Simon Muzenda, national heroes Cdes Richard Hove and Cephas Msipa, were members of the first committee that resulted in the birth of Midlands State University (MSU).

Educationist, Professor Ngwabi Bhebhe who was to become the first vice chancellor of MSU in 1999, sat on the committee as an academic consultant. Previously, he had served as Pro-Vice-Chancellor of the University of Zimbabwe and had published on the Zimbabwe liberation war.
