= Arrie van Rensburg =

South African historian and politician (1929–1998)

Member of the National Assembly
- In office 9 May 1994 – 2 April 1998

Personal details
- Born: Abraham Paul Janse van Rensburg; 5 October 1929 Lindley, Orange Free State; Union of South Africa
- Died: 2 April 1998 (aged 68)
- Party: National Party
- Education: University of the Free State (PhD)

Abraham Paul Janse "Arrie" van Rensburg (5 October 1929 – 2 April 1998) was a South African historian and politician who represented the National Party (NP) in the National Assembly from 1994 until his death in 1998. He was an associate professor in history at the University of Pretoria until 1989, when he became a farmer in the Orange Free State; he entered politics ahead of the 1994 general election.

== Early life and academic career ==
Van Rensburg was born on 5 October 1929 in Lindley in the former Orange Free State. He completed a bachelor's and master's degree at the University of the Free State, in 1949 and 1951 respectively. In 1952, he completed a teaching diploma. After working on the editorial staff of the Volksblad from 1953 to 1954, he taught at a high school in Bethlehem from 1955 to 1962.

In 1963, he was appointed as a lecturer in history at the University of the Free State, where he completed his doctorate in history the following year; his dissertation was an economic history of Afrikaners in the Orange River Colony from 1902 to 1907. He left the Free State to lecture at the University of the Western Cape from 1968 to 1969 and then at the University of Pretoria thereafter. He was promoted to associate professor in 1978 but resigned at the end of 1989 to take up farming in Lindley.

== Parliament: 1994–1998 ==
In the 1994 general election, South Africa's first multi-racial elections, van Rensburg was elected to represent the former governing party, the National Party, in the National Assembly, the lower house of the new South African Parliament. He remained in his seat until his death.

== Personal life and death ==
He was married to Marée van Rensburg and had three sons. He died in a car accident on 2 April 1998.

== See also ==
- List of members of the National Assembly of South Africa who died in office
