= Paula Fortes =

Cape Verdean independence activist

Paula Fortes (1945–2011) was a Cape Verdean independence activist.

A native of Mindelo, Fortes became an orphan at 13, and at 16 joined the struggle against the Portuguese; she organized students at the Escola Piloto. After finishing her studies she trained to become a nurse. She was instrumental in the founding of the Organização das Mulheres de Cabo Verde, of which she served as a leader. She also served in government on the island of Sal, thus becoming the only woman to hold office in the national government immediately after independence. Fortes died in Portugal after an illness of some duration. 2013 saw the posthumous publication of her memoir, Minha Passagem.
