= Don C. Ohadike =

Don Cukwudumebi Ohadike (1941 – 28 August 2005) was one of the foremost scholars of Igbo history. His work emphasized the importance of his inherited culture, which he demonstrated through a passionate interest in rescuing oppressed voices of African peasants and other silenced groups. Ohadike was also an African patriot and a nationalist crusader. His work's core centered around safeguarding African identity in a changing world of cultural globalism.

== Early life and education ==
Ohadike was born in Jos, Nigeria in 1941 to Igbo parents of Anioma extraction.

He earned a B.A. in history and archaeology from University of Nigeria in 1975. In 1977, he earned an M.A. in history from the University of Birmingham, England. He earned a doctorate in history from the University of Jos in 1984.

== Career ==
In 1977, Ohadike's career took off with his appointment as a lecturer at the School of Humanities, University of Port Harcourt. After completing his doctorate, he taught history and served as department chair at the University of Jos. He returned to the United States in 1987 with appointments as a visiting scholar at Northwestern University and Stanford University. He joined the Cornell University faculty in 1989. In 2001, he began a five-year appointment as the director of the Cornell Africana Studies and Research Center.

== Death ==
Ohadike died on 28 August 2005.

== Partial bibliography ==
Books

- The Ekumeku Movement: Western Igbo Resistance to the British Conquest of Nigeria, 1883–1914 (Athens: Ohio University Press, 1991).
- Anioma: A Social History of the Western Igbo People (Athens: Ohio University Press, 1994).
- Pan-African Culture of Resistance: A History of Liberation Movements in Africa and the Diaspora (Binghamton, NY: Global Publications, 2002).
- The Sacred Drums of Liberation: Religions and Music of Resistance in Africa and the Diaspora (Africa World Press, March 2007, published posthumously).

Chapters and articles

- "Diffusion and Physiological Responses to the Influenza Pandemic of 1918-1919 in Nigeria," Social Science and Medicine 32, no. 12 (1991): 1393-99.
- “Igbo Culture and History.” In Chinua Achebe's Things Fall Apart (New York: Anchor, 1994), xix–xlix.
