= Britain and the World =

- Discipline: History of Britain and the British Empire
- Language: English

Publication details
- History: 2008–present
- Publisher: Edinburgh University Press
- Frequency: Biannually

Standard abbreviations
- ISO 4: Br. World

Indexing
- ISSN: 2043-8575

Britain and the World (BATW) is a scholarly society focusing on Britain's role in the world from the sixteenth century to the present. It publishes a biannual academic journal published by Edinburgh University Press also entitled Britain and the World, as well as a "Britain and the World" book series with Palgrave Macmillan. BATW also organizes a yearly academic conference, which has been held in both US and UK locations. Launched in 2006 under the name "The British Scholar Society," BATW is currently chaired by Martin Farr of Newcastle University. The chair of its advisory board is Linda Colley of Princeton University. BATW describes its membership as made up of "individuals from around the world who share a common interest in Britain, its history, and its interactions with the wider world."
