= Moulay Ismail University =

- Université Moulay Ismail
- The logo of Moulay Ismail University
- Established: 1989; 37 years ago
- President: Ahmed Mouchtachi
- Location: Meknes, Morocco; 33°53′42″N 5°33′17″W
- Language: Arabic; French; English
- Website: www.umi.ac.ma

Moulay Ismail University (French: Université Moulay Ismail; Arabic: جامعة مولاي إسماعيل; Standard Moroccan Tamazight: ⵜⴰⵙⴷⴰⵡⵉⵜ ⵏ ⵎⵓⵍⴰⵢ ⵙⵎⴰⵄⵉⵏ) is a public higher education and nonprofit scientific research institution located in Meknes, Morocco. Established on October 23, 1989, by Royal Decree No. 21–86–144, the university has a student population of approximately 38,000.

In 2016, it was ranked 100th in the regional ranking of Arab universities by U.S. News & World Report.

The university is named in honor of Moulay Ismail, who served as Sultan of Morocco from 1672 to 1727.

== History ==
- 1982: Creation of the first two faculties in Meknes—the Faculty of Letters and the Faculty of Sciences—both affiliated with Sidi Mohamed Ben Abdellah University in Fez.
- October 23, 1989: Establishment of Moulay Ismail University by Royal Decree No. 21–86–144, dated 22 Rabi I 1410 (October 23, 1989). The two aforementioned faculties formed its core.
- 1993: Creation of the Faculty of Legal, Economic, and Social Sciences, as well as the Higher School of Technology (EST) in Meknes.
- 1994: Opening of the Faculty of Science and Technology (FST) in Errachidia, located in the Meknes-Tafilalet region.
- 1997: The National Higher School of Arts and Crafts (ENSAM) was founded in Meknes, the only institution of its kind in Morocco and Africa.
- 2006: Opening of a multidisciplinary faculty in Errachidia.
- 2014: Establishment of a Higher School of Technology in Khénifra.
- 2019: Creation of the National School of Commerce and Management (ENCG) in Meknes.

== Geographic Coverage ==
Open-access faculties are available to students from the Meknes-Tafilalet region. The EST and the National Higher School of Arts and Crafts (ENSAM)—which have limited enrollment (preselection based on baccalaureate grades for the former, preselection and competitive exams for the latter)—are open to all Moroccan students. Places are regularly reserved for international students, particularly Africans.

== Faculties and Schools ==
=== Faculties ===
- Faculty of Sciences (FS), Meknes
- Faculty of Letters and Human Sciences (FLSH), Meknes
- Faculty of Legal, Economic, and Social Sciences (FSJES), Meknes
- Faculty of Science and Technology (FST), Errachidia
- Multidisciplinary Faculty (FP), Errachidia

=== Schools ===
- National Higher School of Arts and Crafts (ENSAM), Meknes
- Higher School of Technology (EST), Meknes
- National School of Commerce and Management (ENCG), Meknes
- Higher Normal School (ENS), Meknes

=== In Development ===
- National Higher School of Journalism and Media in Meknes
- National Institute of Applied Sciences of Meknes
- Faculty of Dental Medicine in Meknes
- National Higher School of Food Industry and Biotechnology (Meknes/Azrou)
- National Higher School of Sports Facilities in Ifrane
- Multidisciplinary Faculty in Midelt

== Programs and Degrees ==
=== Bachelor’s Degree Programs (Fundamental Studies) ===
- Faculty of Sciences:
  - Chemical Sciences
  - Physical Sciences
  - Earth and Universe Sciences
  - Life Sciences
  - Mathematics and Applications
- Faculty of Legal, Economic, and Social Sciences:
  - Economics and Management
  - Private Law (Arabic)
  - Public Law (Arabic)
  - Private Law (French)
  - Public Law (French)
- Faculty of Letters and Human Sciences:
  - Arabic Studies
  - Islamic Studies
  - French Studies
  - English Studies
  - History and Civilization
  - Geography
  - Philosophy
  - Sociology

=== Professional Bachelor’s Programs ===
- Higher School of Technology:
  - Finance & Banking
  - Sales Force Management
  - Computer Science, Electronics, Electrical Engineering, and Automation (IEEA)
- Faculty of Sciences:
  - Professional Bachelor's in Computer Science (Java & C++ Development)
  - Geological Engineering
  - Environmental Sciences
  - Physicochemical Analysis and Applications
- Faculty of Legal, Economic, and Social Sciences:
  - Corporate Tax and Accounting Management
- Faculty of Letters and Human Sciences:
  - Archaeology and Heritage Sciences

=== State Engineering Degrees ===
- National Higher School of Arts and Crafts (ENSAM):
  - Mechanical and Structural Engineering
  - Industrial and Manufacturing Engineering
  - Electromechanical Engineering
  - Materials Engineering and Process Engineering

== Notable alumni ==
- Muhammad Al Barka, writer and historian

== See also ==
- List of universities in Morocco
