= Abeodu Bowen Jones =

Liberian historian and politician (1934–2023)

Hannah Abeodu Bowen Jones (1934 – 9 July 2023) was a Liberian historian, politician and diplomat.

== Biography ==
After becoming the first Liberian woman to gain a PhD, she became a professor at the University of Liberia. In the 1970s she was the only woman in the cabinet of William Tubman. From 1981 to 1984 she was Liberia's Permanent Representative to the United Nations. During the Liberian Civil War she moved to the United States and taught at Chicago State University.

Jones died on 9 July 2023.

== Works ==
- Grand Cape Mount County : an historical and cultural study of a developing society in Liberia, 1964.
- (ed.) The official papers of William V.S. Tubman, President of the Republic of Liberia: covering addresses, messages, speeches and statements 1960-1967, 1968
