= Obizi =

Town in Imo State, Nigeria

Obizi is an Autonomous community in Ezinihitte Mbaise Local Government Area of Imo state, in South-Eastern Nigeria.

It is notable among the communities in the Local Government as having produced many notable public figures, and is referred to as "Small London" by the inhabitants who take pride in the community.

It shares boundaries with Onicha, Udo, Eziudo, Obowo, and the Imo river.

Among the notable institutions of formal learning in Obizi are

- St Augustine's Secondary School formerly St. Augustine's Commercial School, founded in 1963
- Obizi High Secondary Boys School
- Obizi Town School

The markets of Obizi include the Afor Obizi and Ogwumabiri daily market.

The community is divided into clans including:

- Amudi
- Umuire
- Eziala
- Umuosisi
- Ekwerazu

The native dialect is Igbo as in the rest of the state and the predominant religion is Christianity as most of the shrines of the forefathers have been brought down under the influence of Christianity.

The Obizi autonomous community is also bordered by Obokwu, which used to be one of the villages in Obizi but is now an autonomous community with its own unique culture and a traditional ruler.
