= Al-Jawwani =

Arab-Egyprian historic

al-Sharif al-Jawwani
- شريف الدين الجواني

Personal life
- Born: 525 AH / 1131 AD, Cairo, Egypt
- Died: 588 AH / 1192 AD
- Era: Medieval era
- Region: Cairo (Fatimid Caliphate)
- Main interest(s): History, genealogy

Religious life
- Religion: Islam

Sharīf al-Dīn Abu Ali Muḥammad ibn Sana' al-Mulk As'ad ibn Ali al-Jawwani (Arabic: شريف الدين أبوعلي محمد بن سناء الملك أسعد بن علي الجوّاني, 1131–1192) better known as Al-Jawwani, was a 12th-century Arab Egyptian historian and genealogist in Fatimid Egypt.

== Life ==
Al-Jawwani was born in Cairo to a family of Husaynid descent (descendants of Husayn) and he was known by the honorific title al-Sharif. His father, who was originally from Mosul, immigrated west where he settled in Cairo, which at the time was the capital city of the Fatimid Caliphate, and he reached a high status at the Fatimid court. Al-Jawwani followed in his father's footsteps and also served the Fatimids, in particular holding the position of Naqib al-ashraf.

== Works ==
- al-Nuqat li mu'jam ma Ushkil min al-Khitat (Points on Difficult Plans)
- al-Jawhar al-Maknun fi Dhikr al-Qaba'il wal Butun (The Jewel on Tribes)

== See also ==
- List of pre-modern Arab scientists and scholars
- List of Muslim historians
