= André Miquel =

French arabist and historian (1929–2022)

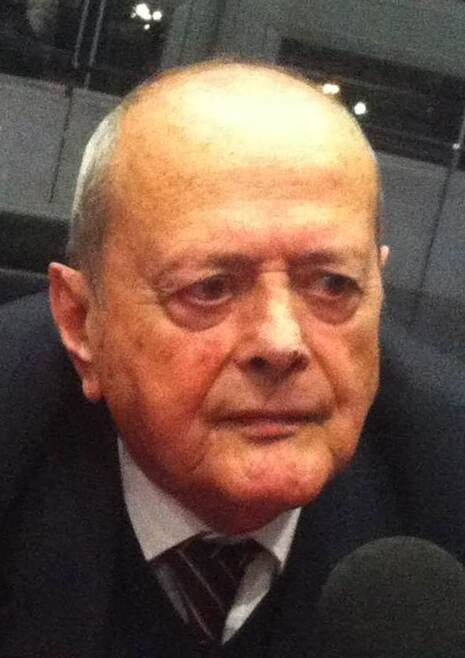
- Miquel at a seminar at Arab World Institute in Paris
- Born: 26 September 1929; Mèze, Hérault, France
- Died: 27 December 2022 (aged 93); Paris, France
- Education: École Normale Supérieure
- Occupation: Historian

André Miquel (26 September 1929 – 27 December 2022) was a French Arabist and historian, specialist of Arabic literature and Arabic language.

== Biography ==
André Miquel was born in Mèze, Hérault on 26 September 1929. He studied literature. A student of the École normale supérieure which he joined in 1950, agrégé de grammaire and docteur ès lettres, from 1976 to 1997, he was holder of the Chair of classical Arabic language and literature at the Collège de France, of which he was general administrator from 1991 to 1997, after being that of the Bibliothèque nationale from 1984 to 1987.

Miquel was known for his work on the geography of the Arab World and the One Thousand and One Nights. His interest in the Arab world dates back to a trip to the Maghreb he won after winning the concours général of geography in 1946, and his discovery of the Quran in the translation by Claude-Étienne Savary.

In 2005, in collaboration with Jamel Eddine Bencheikh, he realised a new translation of the One Thousand and One Nights which was published in the Bibliothèque de la Pléiade. This translation includes all 1205 poems based on the edition of Bulaq, named after the Egyptian city where the text was printed for the first time in 1835.

== Career ==
=== Diplomacy ===
From 1955 to 1956, André Miquel served as Secretary General of the French Cultural and Archaeological Mission in Ethiopia. He subsequently taught at the Lycée Blaise-Pascal in Clermont-Ferrand during the 1956–1957 academic year.

== Death ==
Miquel died in Paris on 27 December 2022, at the age of 93.

== Honours and awards ==
=== Honours ===
- Grand Officier of the Legion of Honour.
- Officier of the National Order of Merit.
- Commander of the Palmes académiques.
- Commander of the Ordre des Arts et des Lettres.

=== Awards ===
- 1969 : Marie-Eugène/Simon-Henri-Martin Award of the Académie Française (France).
- 2010 : King Abdullah bin Abdulaziz International Award for Translation (KSA).
- 2010 : Golden Award at Doha Arab Cultural Capital Festival (Qatar).
- 2019 : Mohammed bin Rashid Arabic Language Award (UAE).

=== Acknowledgement ===
- Member of the Academia Europaea.
- Member of the Heidelberg Academy of Sciences and Humanities.
- Honorary member of the Arab Academy of Damascus.
- Honorary member of the Tunisian foundation for translation, the establishment of texts and studies.

== Selected publications ==
=== Principal works ===
- 1968: L’Islam et sa civilisation (VIIe-XXe siècle)éd. Armand Colin, coll. "Destins du monde", Paris, work distinguished by the Académie française.
- 1971: Le fils interrompu
- 1973: La géographie humaine du monde musulman jusqu'au milieu du 11 siècle, vol. 1: Géographie et géographie humaine dans la littérature arabe des origines à 1050.
- 1975: La géographie humaine du monde musulman jusqu'au milieu du 11e siècle, vol.2: Géographie arabe et représentation du monde : la terre et l'étranger.
- 1977: Langue et littérature arabes classiques, éd. Collège de France.
- 1978: Vive la suranie, éditions Flammarion.
- 1980: La géographie humaine du monde musulman jusqu'au milieu du 11e siècle, vol.3: Le milieu naturel.
- 1981: La Littérature arabe, Presses universitaires de France, "Que sais-je ?".
- 1988: La géographie humaine du monde musulman jusqu'au milieu du 11e siècle, vol.4: Les travaux et les jours, Éditions de l'EHESS, coll. "Civilisations et sociétés".
- 1990: L'Orient d'une vie, in collaboration with Gilles Plazy, éd. Payot.
- 1991: Les Arabes, l'islam et l'Europe, Paris, Flammarion, with Dominique Chevallier and Azzedine Guellouz.
- 1992: L'Evénement : le Coran, sourate LVI, éd. Odile Jacob.
- 1992: D'Arabie et d'Islam, éd. Odile Jacob, with Jamel Eddine Bencheikh
- 1994: Du Golfe aux océans. L'Islam, éd. Hermann, Paris.
- 1995: Les Arabes : du message à l'histoire, éd. Fayard, Paris, 1995 with Dominique Chevallier and Mohamed El Aziz Ben Achour.
- 1996: Deux Histoires d'amour : De Majnûn à Tristan, éd. Odile Jacob.
- 2007: Le vieil homme et le vent, Pézenas, éd. Domens.
- 2010: Croire ou rêver, éd. Bayard.
- 2016: Le temps se signe à quelques repères: Mémoire, éd. Odile Jacob.

=== Translations ===
- 1957: Ibn al-Muqaffa' (ʿAbd Allāh ibn al-Muqaffaʿ), Le livre de Kalila et Dimna, Paris, Klincksieck.
- 2005: Les Mille et une Nuits, Éditions Gallimard, "Bibliothèque de la Pléiade", translated with Jamel Eddine Bencheikh.

Preceded by Alain Gourdon	General Administrator of the Bibliothèque nationale 1984–1987	Succeeded by Emmanuel Le Roy Ladurie
