= Louise Pirouet =

British teacher and researcher

(Margaret Mary) Louise Pirouet (1928–2012) was a British teacher and researcher.

Pirouet was born to missionary parents in Cape Town, South Africa. She gained her PhD at Makerere University in 1968. She subsequently taught at the University of Nairobi in Kenya. From 1978 to 1989 she was Senior Lecturer in Religious Studies at Homerton College, Cambridge. She died 21 December 2012.

== Works ==
- Black evangelists: the spread of Christianity in Uganda, 1891–1914, London: Collings, 1978.
- Historical dictionary of Uganda, Metuchen, N.J.: Scarecrow Press, 1995.
- Whatever happened to asylum in Britain? A tale of two walls, New York, N.Y.: Berghahn Books, 2001. Studies in Forced Migration, v. 9.
