= Martin Lynn =

- Born: 31 August 1951; Lagos, Nigeria
- Died: 15 April 2005 (aged 53)
- Occupations: Historian, academic
- Employer: Queen's University Belfast
- Known for: African history

Academic background
- Education: King's College London; SOAS, University of London

Academic work
- Discipline: History
- Sub-discipline: Economic history of West Africa

Martin Lynn (31 August 1951 – 15 April 2005) was a British and Nigerian historian and academic, specialising in African History. Having taught at the University of Ilorin, he moved to Queen's University Belfast in 1980. Here Lynn taught British and Imperial history and, later on African and Chinese history. His particular academic expertise was in the economic history of West Africa. In 2002 he was appointed Professor of African History. He was the first person to hold a professorship in African history in Ireland.

Lynn, a native of Nigeria, studied at School of Oriental and African Studies, University of London (MA) and King's College London (PhD). He was an active member of the Society of Friends. His book 'Encountering the Light: A Journey Taken' describes his spiritual journey as a Quaker. In the volume Lynn encourages contemporary members of the community to connect with the experiences of early Quakers. The Martin Lynn Scholarship in African History, administered by the Royal Historical Society, was founded in his memory.

== Selected works ==
His publications include:

- Commerce and Economic Change in West Africa: The Palm Oil Trade in the Nineteenth Century (Cambridge University Press, 1997)
- Nigeria 1943-60 in the British Documents at the End of the Empire project (HMSO, London, 2001)
- Wood, Betty; Lynn, Martin, eds. (2002). Travel, trade, and power in the Atlantic, 1765-1884. Cambridge: Cambridge University Press for the Royal Historical Society. ISBN 9780521823128.
- Encountering the Light: A Journey Taken (Ebor Press, York, 2007)
