= Joseph Adebowale Atanda =

Nigerian historian (1932–1996)

Joseph Adebowale Atanda (2 January 1932 – 6 December 1996) was a Nigerian native of Eruwa, in Oyo State, Nigeria. He obtained his B.A. (Hons) in History in 1964 from the University of London and a PhD. in history in 1967 from the University of Ibadan.

Atanda was associated with at The University of Ibadan from 1967- 1991 and attained the title of Professor in History. His primary area of research interest was African History, specializing in Nigeria with emphasis on Yorubaland in Western Nigeria and Buganda in East Africa. A Secondary area of research interest concerned the survival and the achievements of Africans and their descendants transported to the West Indian Islands and the Americans during the European Atlantic trade with West Africa. At The University of Ibadan, apart from being a Lecturer, he was a Representative of the Faculty of Arts on the Board of Studies and faculty Board of Education, Congregation Member of Senate, a memberof the Senate Committee for The Institute of African Studies, Assistant Warden of Azikwe Hall and Ag. Head, Department of History. During his career, he also lectured at Ogun State University, Ago-Iwoye, Makere University, Uganda, University of Chicago, U.S.A, and University College of Belize, Belize.

Atanda's public/community service included acting as Commissioner for Local Government and Chieftaincy Affairs, Western State of Nigeria, November 1975- March 1976, Oyo State Commissioner for Health, April 1976- March 1977, Oyo State Commissioner for Finance and Economic Development, April 1977- September 1978, Oyo State Commissioner for Local Government, October 1978- September 1979. He was also Chairman, Board of Governors, Obaseku High School, Eruwa Nigeria, 1972-1975, Member, 1973 National Census Sub-Committee on Historical Events, Western State of Nigeria 1983-84, Chairman, Management Committee of the Ibarapa Local Council, Western State, Nigeria. 1973-1974, Chairman, Ibadan Zonal Health Board and Member of Western State of Nigeria Health Council, 1975, Member, Board of Governors, Baptist Theological Seminary, Ogbomoso, 1985-1988, and Chairman, Board of Governors, Baptist Theological Seminary, Ogbomoso, 1988- 1990.

== Bibliography ==
=== Books ===
*The New Oyo Empire: Indirect Rule and Change in Western Nigeria, 1894- 1934, Longman, London 1973

*An Introduction to Yoruba History, Ibadan University Press, 1980

*(Ed.) Travels and Exploration in Yorubalaland, 1854- 1858 by W.H. Clarke, Ibadan University Press 1972

*(Ed.) Baptist Churches in Nigeria: Accounts of their Foundation and Growth, 1850- 1950: University Press, Ibadan, 1988

=== book chapters ===
*"The Changing of Status of the Alaafin of Oyo under Colonial Rule and Independence" in M. Crowder and O. Ikime (EDs) West African Chiefs: Their Changing Status under Colonial rule and Independence, University of Ife Press & A.RC, New York, 1970, pp. 212–230.

*"Collision and Coalition in the Politics and Society of Western Nigeria in the 19th century" in J.F Ade Ajayi and B. Ikara (EDs) The Evolution of Political Culture in Nigeria, University Press, Ibadan, 1985, pp. 85–103.

"Ideological Re-orientation for Government and Public Policy in Nigeria" in Tekena N.Tamuno and J.A Atanda (EDs) Nigeria Since Independence: The First 25 years, vol. IV: Government and public Policy, Heinemann, Ibadan, 1989, pp. 273–283

"Towards Education for Self-Reliance and Nation Building in Nigeria" in Tekena N. Tamuno and J.A Atanda (EDs) Nigeria Since Independence: The First 25 years, vol. III: Education, Heinemann, Ibadan, 1989, pp. 227– 246

"Paradoxes and Problems of Religion and Secularism in Nigeria: Suggestions for Solution" in J.A Atanda, Garba Ashiwaju & Yaya Abubakar (Eds) Nigeria SInce Independence: The First 25 years, vol. IX: Religion, Heinemann, Ibadan, 1989, pp. 184– 194.

"The Fulani Jihad and the Collapse of the Old Oyo Empire" in Toyin Falola (Ed.) Yoruba Historiography, University of Wisconsin, Madison, 1991, pp. 105– 121.

=== Journal articles ===
"The Iseyin- Okeiho Rising of 1916: An example of Socio-Political Conflict in Colonial Nigeria" Journal of the Historical Society of Nigeria, vol. IV, No. 4, 1969, pp. 498– 514.

"The Bakopi in the Kingdom of Buganda, 1900- 1912: An analysis of the Condition of the peasant Class in Early Colonial Period" Uganda Journal, vol. 33, 1969, pp. 151– 162

"Indirect Rule in Yorubaland" Tarikh, vol. 3, 1970, pp. 16– 28

"The fall of the old Oyo Empire: A reconstruction of its cause" Journal of the Historical Society of Nigeria, vol. V, no.4, 1971, pp. 477– 490

"Government of Yorubaland in the pre-colonial Period" Tarikh, vol. 4, No. 2, 1971, pp. 1– 12

"The Yoruba Ogboni Cult: Did it exist in Old Oyo?" Journal of the Historical Society of Nigeria, vol 6, 1973, pp. 365– 372

"Colonial rule in Buganda" Tarikh, vol. 4 no. 4, 1971. pp. 37– 53, 1972

"The Factor of African Resistance in British Land Policy in West Africa; The Ibadan example in Nigeria" Ikenga, vol. 3, Nos 1 & 2, 1975- 1979

"The Historian and the problem of Origins of peoples in Nigerian Society" Journal of the Historical Society of Nigeria, vol. X, No.3, December, 1980, pp. 63– 77.

"The origins of the Yoruba Reconsidered" Odu: A Journal of West African Studies, New Series, No.25 January 1984, pp. 3– 19

"A Historical Perspective of Intellectual life in Yoruba Society up to c.1900" Journal of the Historical Society of Nigeria, vol. IX, Nos. 3 & 4, 1983, pp. 49– 65

"Yoruba Unity in Historical Perspectives" Oyo-State Annual Visionlink, Lagos, 1990, pp. 14– 20

Atanda was a member of Historical Society of Nigeria, Council of the Historical Society of Nigeria, Historical Committee of the Baptist World Alliance, Heritage Commission of the Baptist World Alliance, Presidential Panel on Nigeria History Since Independence, Belize Historical Society, American Historical Association, African Studies Association.

== Honours ==
- Rockefeller Foundation Travel Grant as visiting Lecturer at Makerere University, Kampala, Uganda January–August 1969.
- Rockefeller Foundation Grant to serve on Exchange programme at the University of Chicago, Illinois, U.S.A 1969/70 academic year
- Life Honorary membership, Frank London Brown Historical Association, Chicago U.S.A
- J.F. Odunjo Memorial Lecturer, 1990
- Inaugural Lecturer on behalf of the Faculty of Arts, University of Ibadan, 1989/1990,
- University College of Belize, Central America, Visiting Professor under The Nigerian technical Aid Corps Programme, 1991-1994
