= Mounira Harbi-Riahi =

Tunisian archeologist

Mounira Harbi-Riahi is a Tunisian archeologist and historian, best known for her writings on the prehistory of Tunisia, in her encyclopaedic book series Atlas préhistorique de la Tunisie (1985–present).
