= Folarin Shyllon =

British historian (1940–2021)

Folarin Olawale Shyllon (23 July 1940 – 13 January 2021) was a lawyer recognised for his contributions to the history of black people in Britain and his work on cultural heritage law and protection of cultural heritage.

== Early life and education ==
Shyllon studied law at King's College London, receiving an LLB in 1966 and LLM in 1967.

== Research and publications ==
Shyllon was the foundation dean at the Faculty of Law at the University of Ibadan from 1983.

Notable works included Black Slaves in Britain (1974), which was praised by Asa Briggs, and Black People in Britain, 1555-1833 (1977).

Shyllon was committed to the protection of cultural heritage. He headed the committee of the National Archives of Nigeria and was a key figure in developing the UNESCO Convention on the Means of Prohibiting and Preventing the Illicit Import, Export and Transfer of Ownership of Cultural Property (1970) and the UNIDROIT Convention on Stolen or Illegally Exported Cultural Objects (1995). He was the author of two chapters in the Oxford Handbook on International Cultural Heritage Law (2020). Shyllon was a member of the International Cultural Property Society on the board of the International Journal of Cultural Property.

He actively campaigned for the recovery of looted artefacts, including the Benin Bronzes.

== Later life ==
Shyllon retired from Ibadan in 2005. He was made Fellow of the W.E.B. DuBois Institute at Harvard University. In 2007, he became Dean at the Olabisi Onabanjo University. He was later on a Member of the Board of the Federal Inland Revenue Service of Nigeria.
