= Gamaliel Mbonimana =

Rwandan historian

Gamaliel Mbonimana is a Rwandan historian, Professor Emeritus at the National University of Rwanda. He is "well-known throughout Rwanda for his work as a cultural historian and musicologist".

In 2007, he was called as an expert witness for the prosecution at the trial of Simon Bikindi before the International Criminal Tribunal for Rwanda.

== Works ==
- Musique rwandaise traditionnelle [Traditional Rwandan music]. Butare, Rwanda, 1971.
- (with the Centre de formation et de recherche coopératives) Les coopératives du Rwanda: un creuset de réconciliation et de coexistence pacifique [Rwanda's cooperatives: a crucible of reconciliation and peaceful coexistence]. Kigali, 1997.
- (with Jean de Dieu Karangwa) 'Topical Analysis of the songs ‘Twasezereye’(‘We bade farewell’), ‘Nanga abahutu’(‘I hate Hutu’) and ‘Bene sebahinzi’ (‘The descendants of Sebahinzi’).' Expert Report prepared for the ICTR for The Prosecution vs. Simon Bikindi. Case no. ICTR=2001=72=I, 2006
- Amateka y'ubuvanganzo Nyarwanda: kuva mu kinyejana cya XVII kugeza magingo aya [History of Rwandan literature: from the 17th century to the present]. 2011.
- Le Rwanda : Etat-nation au XIXè siècle [Rwanda: 19th-century nation state]. 2016.
