= Oluremi Atanda =

Nigerian agricultural scientist (1939–2024)

Oluremi Atanda (22 September 1939 – 4 March 2024) was a Nigerian agricultural scientist, administrator and holder of the Nigeria's Order of the Federal Republic (OFR).

== Biography ==
Born on 22 September 1939, in Iwo, Osun State, Atanda attended Amin Training Centre, a Quraanic school in Iwo until 1946. He started his primary education in 1946 at the Baptist Day School, Oke Odo, in Iwo and graduated in 1952. For secondary school education, he attended Molusi College, Ijebu Igbo. After his higher school certificate examination in 1958 at the Government College, Ibadan, he proceeded to study Agricultural Science at the University of Nottingham in England. He subsequently earned his PhD at the University of Newcastle.

Atanda began his research career at the West Africa Cocoa Research Institute in Ibadan in 1964, and worked there until 1972 when he joined the Agricultural Research Council of Nigeria. In 1975, he left the council to serve as the Director of the Federal Department of Agriculture. Between 1976 and 1979, Atanda worked with the National Cereals Research Institute. He later worked as the Director of the Forestry Research Institute of Nigeria between 1979 and 1980, and the Chairman of the Oyo State Civil Service Commission between 1980 and 1983. He has also consulted for other bodies including the United Nations Food and Agriculture Organisation. He was on the board of trustees of the International Institute of Tropical Agriculture (IITA), between 1976 and 1978.

After serving as a member of National Committee on Subsidies to Nigeria Agriculture between 1986 and 1987, Atanda retired from the public service after nearly 25 years. An educationalist, Atanda is the proprietor of Atanda Group of Schools.

Until his death on 4 March 2024, Atanda was the Eketa of Iwo and the president of Iwo Board of Trustees.

Aremu described the late Atanda as a seasoned agricultural scientist, world-class educationist.
