= G. O. Olusanya =

Nigerian academic, administrator and diplomat (1936–2012)

Gabriel Olakunle Olusanya (1936–2012) was a Nigerian academic, administrator and diplomat who was the Nigerian ambassador to France from 1991 to 1996. In academia, many of his scholarly works focused on contemporary Nigerian history and foreign relations.

== Life ==
Olusanya attended Methodist Boys' High School, Lagos and studied history at the University College, Ibadan (now University of Ibadan). He furthered his studies at the University of British Columbia and later earned a doctorate degree from University of Toronto.

After completing his studies, he took up a teaching appointment in the Northern Nigerian region at Ahmadu Bello University, where his former history teacher, Abdullahi Smith was developing ABU's history department. However, political and ethnic conflict preceding the Nigerian civil war precipitated his movement to University of Lagos in 1966.

Olusanya through publications of his works and appointments to government think tanks gained public visibility as an academic and intellectual. He wrote about economic and political policies and factors between 1939 and 1945 that prodded the development of nationalism in his published work The Second World War and Politics in Nigeria 1939–1953. In 1982, he published The West African Students' Union and the Politics of Decolonisation, 1925–1958, an exercise about the role of the West African Student Union in the welfare of African students and effect on awakening political consciousness among the students.

Olusanya was a foundation scholar and director of studies at the National Institute of Policy and Strategic Studies. In 1984, he was appointed director-general of Nigeria's foremost foreign relations think tank, the Nigerian Institute of International Affairs.

== Selected works ==
- The Second World War and politics in Nigeria, 1939-1953 (Evans, 1973) ISBN 0237285401
- The evolution of the Nigerian civil service, 1861-1960 : the problems of Nigerianization (University of Lagos, 1975)
- The West African Students' Union and the politics of decolonisation, 1925-1958 (Daystar Press, 1982) ISBN 978122164X
- Memoirs of a disillusioned patriot (Afremac, 2003) ISBN 9788059058
