= African Studies Association of the United Kingdom =

Academic society formed in 1963

The African Studies Association of the United Kingdom (ASAUK) formed in 1963 "to advance African studies, particularly in the United Kingdom, by providing facilities for the interchange of information and ideas and the co-ordination of activities by and between persons and institutions concerned with the study of Africa." Antony Allott and Roland Oliver led the founding of the group. In recent times, the Royal African Society administers the association.

The group organizes conferences and supports the Standing Committee on University Studies in Africa and the Standing Conference on Library Materials on Africa.

== Presidents ==
- 1963 to 1964: Margery Perham (inaugural president)
- 1964 to 1965: Audrey Richards
- c. 1964: A.F. Robertson
- 1966 to 1967: Roland Oliver
- 1969 to 1970: Antony Allott
- 1978 to 1979: Shula Marks
- 1980 to 1982: Terence Ranger
- c. 1985: David Birmingham
- 1988 to 1990: Anthony Kirk-Greene
- 1990 to 1992: John McCracken
- 1992 to 1994: Christopher Clapham
- 1996 to 1998: Richard Hodder-Williams
- 1998 to 2000: J.D.Y. Peel
- 2000 to 2002: Karin Barber
- 2002 to 2004: Nici Nelson
- 2004 to 2006: Graham Furniss
- 2006 to 2008: Tunde Zack-Williams
- 2008 to 2010: William Beinart
- 2010 to 2012: Megan Vaughan
- 2012 to 2014: Stephanie Newell
- 2014 to 2016: David Maxwell
- 2016 to 2018: Insa Nolte
- 2018 to 2020: Ambreena Manji
- 2020 to 2022: Ola Uduku
- 2022 to 2024: Carli Coetzee
- 2024 onwards: Louisa Uchum Egbunike

== Distinguished Africanist Award / Outstanding African Studies Award ==
The ASAUK "Distinguished Africanist Award" was established in 2001 to pay tribute to those "who have made exceptional contributions to the field of African studies". In 2022, it was renamed as the "Outstanding African Studies Award".

Recipients have been:

- 2001: Basil Davidson, John Fage, and Douglas Rimmer
- 2002: Lionel Cliffe, Eldred D. Jones, Marjorie Jones, and Shula Marks
- 2004: Roland Oliver and Terence Ranger
- 2005: Anthony Kirk-Greene
- 2006: John Lonsdale
- 2007: George Shepperson
- 2008: John McCracken
- 2009: James Currey
- 2010: Robin Law
- 2011–12: Kenneth King, Pravina King, and Lalage Bown
- 2013–14: Gavin Williams
- 2015–16: J. D. Y. Peel, Nici Nelson, and Richard Hodder-Williams
- 2017–18: Paulo Fernando de Moraes Farias and Karin Barber
- 2019–20: Tunde Zack-Williams
- 2020: Bibi Bakare-Yusuf
- 2022: Ray Bush
- 2024: Hakim Adi

== See also ==
- Africa-Europe Group for Interdisciplinary Studies – AEGIS, European association of research groups focusing on African studies.
- African Studies Association – US-based research network focusing on African studies.
- Associazione per gli Studi Africani in Italia – ASAI, Italy- based research network focusing on African studies

== Publication ==
- African research and documentation : the journal of the African Studies Association of the UK and the Standing Commission [Conference] on Library Materials on Africa, Birmingham: African Studies Association of the United Kingdom, 1973, ISSN 0305-862X From 1973 to 2021. From volume 66 (1994), it was published by SCOLMA (Standing Conference on Library Materials on Africa, UK Libraries and Archives Group on Africa), London. Accordingly, since then the title is African research and documentation. Journal of the Standing Commission on Library Materials on Africa. In 2022, African Research and Documentation merged with Africa Bibliography into Africa Bibliography, Research and Documentation.
