= SOAS School of Law =

University of London law school in the UK

Coordinates: 51.52251°N 0.12892°W

- Established: 1947
- Dean: Scott Newton
- Administrative staff: 50
- Undergraduates: 210
- Postgraduates: 130
- Location: Thornhaugh Street, Russell Square, Bloomsbury, London, UK
- Website: www.soas.ac.uk/law/

The SOAS School of Law is a law school of the University of London. It is based in the Paul Webley wing of the Senate House in Bloomsbury, London, United Kingdom. The SOAS School of Law has an emphasis on the legal systems of Asia, Africa and the Middle East.

The School of Law has over 401 students. It offers programmes at the LLB, LLM and MPhil/PhD level. International students have been the majority at both the undergraduate and postgraduate level for many years.

It publishes a number of journals, including the Journal of African Law, the Journal of Comparative Law and the Yearbook of Islamic and Middle Eastern Law. Along with the International Environmental Law Research Centre (IELRC), it produces the Law, Environment and Development Journal (LEAD Journal). An independent student law journal is also published by undergraduate and graduate students, the SOAS Law Journal, and it publishes articles from faculty, students and alumni.

Notable alumni of the school of law include Foreign Secretary David Lammy MP, former President of Ghana John Atta Mills, Supreme Court justices from Nigeria and Sri Lanka, and Iranian human rights activist Ghoncheh Ghavami.

== History ==
The SOAS School of Law was established in 1947 with Seymour Gonne Vesey-FitzGerald as its first head, and as such is one of the 20 oldest law schools in England. Initially, the School of Law only hosted post-graduate students. In 1975, under the leadership of Antony Nicholas Allott, the school developed a comparative undergraduate LLB which continues to the present. In 2012, the Head of the Law School, Mashood Baderin, was appointed as Special Independent Expert to Sudan by the United Nations Human Rights Council. In 2013, Paul Kohler assumed the role as Head of the SOAS School of Law following the retirement of Baderin.

== Academics ==
The SOAS School of Law Bachelor of Laws (LLB) programme is recognised as a Qualifying Law Degree by the Law Society of England and Wales and the Bar Standards Board for the purposes of completing legal training. As such, the SOAS LLB satisfies all professional requirements for the Common Professional Examination.

Although many modules at SOAS embody a substantial element of English common law, all modules are taught as far as possible in a comparative or international manner with an emphasis in the way in which law functions in society. Thus, law studies at SOAS are broad and comparative in their orientation. All students study a significant amount of non-English law, start in the first year of the LLB course, where 'Legal Systems of Asia and Africa' is compulsory. Specialised modules in the laws and legal systems of particular countries and regions is also encouraged and faculty experts conduct modules in these subjects every year.

Several combination BA degrees also allow students to combine law courses with another faculty, including history and politics. The SOAS School of Law also has a Master of Laws (LLM) which provides many advanced courses on comparative, international and transnational commercial law- all focused on Asian and African legal issues. The SOAS School of Law also offers a PhD programme.

In addition to academic programmes, SOAS School of Law students also have access to several Pro Bono law clinics. These Pro Bono law clinics offer students the opportunity to work alongside practising lawyers on actual cases involving human rights and civil rights which are taken on free of charge to the clients.

=== Research ===
The SOAS School of Law has expertise in the laws of Asian and African countries, human rights, transnational commercial law, environmental law, and comparative law.

It is home to the following research centres:

- Centre for East Asian Laws (CEAL)
- Centre for Law and Conflict
- Centre for Ethnic Minority Studies (CEMS)
- Centre for Islamic and Middle Eastern Law (CIMEL).

Faculty members routinely contribute to journals and publish volumes of leading research annually. The school has close ties with the internationally renowned Institute of Advanced Legal Studies, which is also part of the federal University of London.

=== Publications ===
The SOAS School of Law and faculty members are involved in the publication of the following legal research journals:

- Journal of African Law,
- Journal of Comparative Law,
- Law Reports of the Commonwealth,
- Yearbook of Islamic and Middle Eastern Law,
- Law, Environment and Development Journal (LEAD Journal),
- SOAS Law Journal (Co-founded by five SOAS law students, it is a student-led and edited journal featuring submissions by students, alumni and faculty.)

=== Rankings ===
Rankings
National rankings
- Complete (2027): 32
- Guardian (2026): 39

Global rankings
- QS (2026): 151-200

The SOAS School of Law was ranked 39th out of all British law schools by The Guardian League Table in 2024. The QS World University Rankings placed SOAS in the 151-200 bracket in 2020 for law.

== SOAS Law Society ==
The SOAS Law Society promotes opportunities to learn about the study of law and career options to student members at SOAS. The Law Society hosts meetings, intercollegiate exchanges, mooting tournaments and other educational events. Although there was formerly a separate SOAS Bar Society that conducted bar-related programming and organised moot teams and tournaments, it merged with the Law Society in 2013. Past moot teams fielded by the SOAS Law Society or SOAS Bar Society have participated in the annual English Law Students Association (ELSA) Moot Tournament and the prestigious London Universities Mooting Shield, which was founded by SOAS Law School alumnus, barrister and present New York attorney Daniel Jackson.

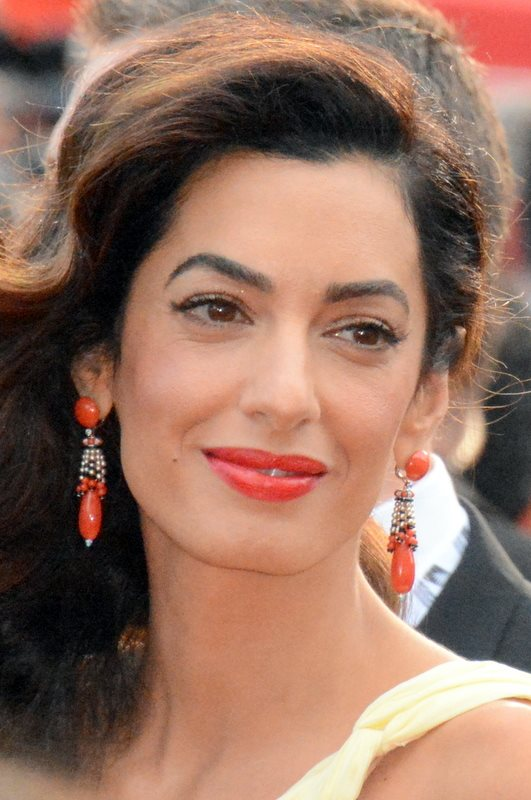
Amal Clooney was a special lecturer on international criminal law.

== Teaching ==
Faculty at the SOAS School of Law are routinely rated highly on national student satisfaction surveys, with the satisfaction rate reaching 91% in 2015.

The SOAS School of Law has more than 30 full-time academic staff, 20 professors, many visiting professors and distinguished judicial and other visiting academic staff.

Visiting Professors

- Amal Clooney - Former visiting professor at SOAS School of Law, human rights barrister and wife of actor George Clooney.
- David W. Kennedy

== Notable alumni ==
=== Heads of State ===
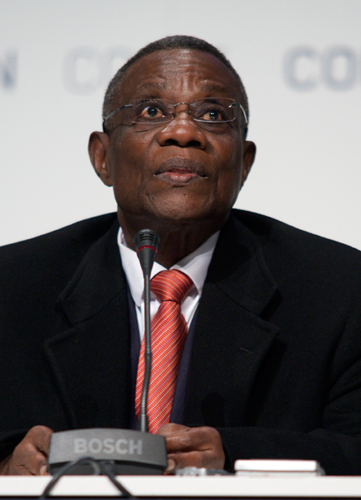
John Atta Mills, former President of Ghana

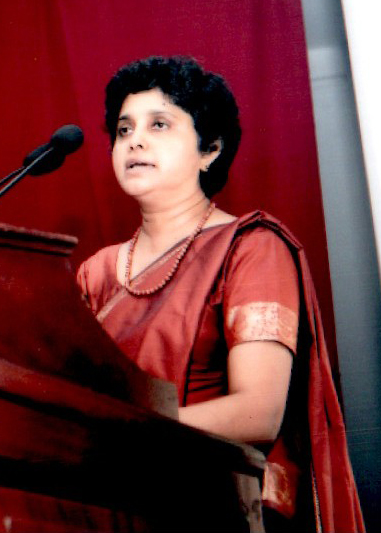
Shirani Bandaranayake: 43rd Chief Justice of the Sri Lankan Supreme Court

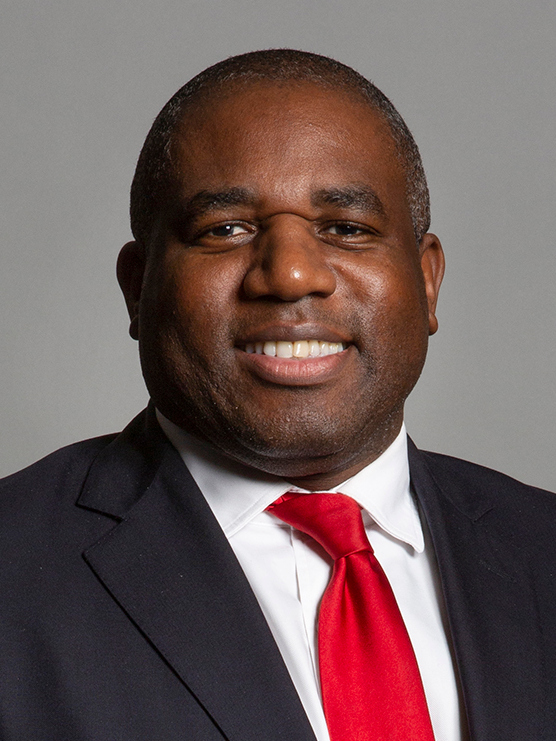
David Lammy MP

- John Atta Mills - Former President of Ghana.

=== Judiciary ===
- Idris Kutigi - Chief Justice of the Supreme Court of Nigeria.
- Sylvester Umaru Onu - Supreme Court Justice of Nigeria.
- Shirani Bandaranayake - Former Chief Justice of Sri Lanka, noted Sri Lankan jurist.
- Henry M. Joko-Smart - Supreme Court Justice of Sierra Leone.

=== Academics ===
- Muhammad Mohar Ali - Bangladeshi Islamic Law scholar.
- Antony Nicholas Allott - comparative law theorist, Professor of Asian Laws at SOAS
- Mohammad Hashim Kamali - Leading expert on Islamic law, noted Afghan academic.
- Chibli Mallat - International lawyer, a law professor, and a former candidate for presidency in Lebanon.
- M. Ershadul Bari - Leading Bangladeshi Constitutional Law expert. He did his PhD in Constitutional Law from SOAS, University of London on a Commonwealth Academic Staff Scholarship in 1985. He was the Dean of the Faculty of Law, University of Dhaka from 1991 to 2001. Subsequently, Professor Bari was appointed the Vice-Chancellor of Bangladesh Open University- a position which he held for nearly 6 years. He, later, served the University of Malaya, Kuala Lumpur, Malaysia as a Professor of Law.

=== Lawyers: Solicitors and Barristers ===
- Charles A. Adeogun-Phillips - Former genocide and war crimes prosecutor.
- Herbert Chitepo - First black barrister in Rhodesia, later known as Zimbabwe, and noted contemporary ally of Robert Mugabe.
- Sara Hossain - Bangladeshi lawyer.

=== Politicians and Diplomats ===
- Francis K. Butagira - Former Ugandan Ambassador to Germany.
- Nihal Jayawickrama - Sri Lankan statesmen.
- David Lammy - British Labour Party MP, candidate for Mayor of London in 2016.
- Mohamed Salih Omer - Sudanese statesman.
- Aaron Mike Oquaye - Ghanaian statesman.
- Gajendrakumar Ponnambalam - Sri Lankan Tamil lawyer, politician and former Member of Parliament.

=== Activists ===
- Husna Ahmad - Bangladeshi environmental campaigner.
- Ghoncheh Ghavami - Iranian civil rights activist.

== See also ==
- Golden triangle (universities)
