= Terence Ranger =

British historian and Africanist (1929–2015)

Terence Ranger FBA
- Born: Terence Osborn Ranger; 29 November 1929; South Norwood, County Borough of Croydon, Surrey, England
- Died: 3 January 2015 (aged 85); Oxford, Oxfordshire, England
- Occupations: Historian, Africanist

Academic background
- Education: Royal Grammar School High Wycombe; The Queen's College, Oxford

Academic work
- Notable ideas: Invented tradition

Terence "Terry" Osborn Ranger FBA (29 November 1929 – 3 January 2015) was a prominent British Africanist, best known as a historian of Zimbabwe. Part of the post-colonial generation of historians, his work spanned the pre- and post-Independence (1980) period in Zimbabwe, from the 1960s to the present. He published and edited dozens of books and wrote hundreds of articles and book chapters, including co-editing The Invention of Tradition (1983) with Eric Hobsbawm. He was the Rhodes Professor of Race Relations at the University of Oxford and the first Africanist fellow of the British Academy.

== Biography ==
Born in South Norwood, south-east London, Terence Ranger was educated at the Royal Grammar School High Wycombe (1940–42), then Highgate School in north London. As an undergraduate he studied history at Queen's College, Oxford University, and went on to complete his PhD at St Antony's College, Oxford, focusing on 17th-century Ireland, under the supervision of Professor Hugh Trevor-Roper. In 1953 he married Shelagh Campbell Clarke, with whom he had three daughters.

In 1957, he moved to modern-day Zimbabwe, at the time Southern Rhodesia, to take up a lectureship at the University College of Rhodesia and Nyasaland (now the University of Zimbabwe) after reading an article by Basil Fletcher, the vice-principal of the university, in The Times newspaper. Ranger became interested in African history and developed views that were considered radical by the white government of the time, leading the Rhodesian authorities to restrict his movement to within a three-mile radius of his home. He was deported in 1963 and took up a lectureship at the University of Dar es Salaam in Tanzania, where his colleagues included John Lonsdale, John Iliffe and John McCracken. During this time, Ranger wrote Revolt in Southern Rhodesia, 1896–97: A Study in African Resistance (1967), which showed how Africans lived before the arrival of Cecil Rhodes and his Pioneer Column in 1890 and attempted to explain why the country's two main tribes, the Shona and Matabele, rose up against the European settlers, and The African Voice in Southern Rhodesia (1970), both of which were influential in the development of African nationalism.

In 1969, Ranger moved to the US to work at the University of California, Los Angeles (UCLA), where he mostly researched African religion. He moved back to the United Kingdom in 1974 to take up a professorship at the University of Manchester where his research focused on Zimbabwe. In 1980, Ranger founded the Britain Zimbabwe Society with Guy Clutton-Brock, of which he was president (2006–14). From 1980 to 1982, he was president of the African Studies Association of the UK (ASAUK) and from 1981 to 1982 president of the Ecclesiastical History Society. During this time, he also published his widely influential work The Invention of Tradition (1983) in collaboration with Eric Hobsbawm.

With the change of regime, Ranger was allowed back into Zimbabwe, which allowed him to undertake research for his book Peasant Consciousness and Guerrilla War, a comparative account of the ways in which ideas were formed among rural people, which was published in 1985. In 1987, he was appointed Rhodes Professor of Race Relations at Oxford University. In the 1990s he undertook two research projects on the history of the Matabeleland region of Zimbabwe, Voices from the Rocks (1999) and Violence and Memory (2000), as well as Are We Not Also Men? (1995), a biography of the Zimbabwean Samkange dynasty (the best-known member of which is Stanlake J. W. T. Samkange), drawing on their extraordinary collection of personal papers.

Ranger retired in 1997 but continued as an emeritus fellow of St Antony's College, Oxford, and spent time at the University of Zimbabwe, where he undertook research for his book Bulawayo Burning (2010), which explores Bulawayo's urban cultural history. Upon returning to the UK, he published influential articles on Zimbabwe's economic crisis and worked with Zimbabwean refugees arriving in the UK, becoming a founding trustee of the charity Asylum Welcome, along with his wife Shelagh. He wrote more than 170 reports addressed to the Home Office regarding asylum cases.

In retirement, Ranger was made a fellow of the Oxford Centre for Mission Studies. In 2013, he published his memoir, entitled Writing Revolt. He was the first Africanist fellow of the British Academy and the first historian of Africa to sit on the board of the historical journal Past & Present. He died at his home in Oxford on 3 January 2015, at the age of 85.

== Selected bibliography ==
Complete bibliography in ACAS Review 89.

- Revolt in Southern Rhodesia, 1896–97. London: Heinemann (1967, 2nd edn 1979). ISBN 0-435-94799-0
- Peasant Consciousness and Guerrilla War in Zimbabwe: A Comparative Study. Oxford: James Currey (1985). ISBN 0-85255-001-4.
- Editor, with Ngwabi Bhebe, Soldiers in Zimbabwe's Liberation War. Oxford: James Currey (1995). ISBN 0-85255-609-8
- Are We Not Also Men? The Samkange Family and African Politics in Zimbabwe, 1920–64. Oxford: James Currey (1995). ISBN 0-85255-618-7
- Editor, with Ngwabi Bhebe, Society in Zimbabwe's Liberation War . Oxford: James Currey (1996). ISBN 0-85255-660-8
- Voices From The Rocks: Nature, Culture and History in the Matopos Hills of Zimbabwe. Oxford: James Currey (1999). ISBN 0-85255-604-7
- With Jocelyn Alexander and JoAnn McGregor, Violence and Memory: One Hundred Years in the "Dark Forests" of Matabeleland. Oxford: James Currey (2000). ISBN 0-85255-692-6
- Bulawayo Burning: The Social History of a Southern African City, 1893–1960. UK: Boydell & Brewer. 2010. ISBN 978-1-84701-020-9.
- Ranger, T. Writing Revolt: An Engagement with African Nationalism, 1957–67. Oxford: James Currey (2013).
