= Louisa Uchum Egbunike =

British-Nigerian academic

- Occupation: Academic
- Employer: Durham University
- Known for: President of African Studies Association of the UK (ASAUK)
- Website: www.durham.ac.uk/staff/louisa-egbunike/

Louisa Uchum Egbunike is a British academic who since 2020 has been an Associate Professor in African Literature at Durham University. She previously taught at Goldsmiths, University of London, City, University of London and Manchester Metropolitan University. Her research has had a focus on Nigerian literature and the legacies of the Nigeria-Biafra war. She obtained her PhD, on "The Igbo Experience in the Igbo-Nigerian Novel", from SOAS, University of London, where she also lectured in Contemporary African Literature, and she was a founder and convener of the international Igbo Conference held in association with SOAS.

In 2016, she was named one of the BBC's New Generation Thinkers, for which ten academics are selected each year. Following this, she was invited to record her essay "In The Shadows of Biafra" in front of an audience at Sage Gateshead in Radio 3's Free Thinking Festival.

She has presented her research at conferences in the US the UK and Nigeria, as well as being an invited guest lecturer at institutions including Wellesley College in Massachusetts. Her writing has been published such academic books and journals as African Literature Today and Matatu and she has been a reviewer for The Times Literary Supplement, in addition to featuring on The Guardian newspaper's podcast.

Egbunike curated the touring multi-media art exhibition Legacies of Biafra, and was co-writer and producer of the documentary film In the Shadow of Biafra, which explores how writers have dealt with the history of the Nigeria-Biafra war, featuring interviews with novelists, poets and critics, including Chimamanda Ngozi Adichie, Inua Ellams, Ernest Emenyonu, Akachi Ezeigbo, Chukwuemeka Ike, Linton Kwesi Johnson, Okey Ndibe, Obi Nwakanma, Nnedi Okorafor, Tochi Onyebuchi and Data Phido.

From September to December 2024, Egbunike was a Visiting Fellow at the Institute of African Studies, University College London (UCL).

Egbunike was elected president of the African Studies Association of the United Kingdom (ASAUK) in 2024.

== Selected writings ==
- — (1 January 2014). "One-Way Traffic: Renegotiating the 'Been-To' Narrative in the Nigerian Novel in the Era of Military Rule". Matatu. 45 (1): 217–232.
- — (2017). "1. Narrating the Past: Orality, History & the Production of Knowledge in the Works of Chimamanda Ngozi Adichie". In Emenyonu, Ernest N. (ed.). A Companion to Chimamanda Ngozi Adichie. Woodbridge, Suffolk: James Currey. pp. 15–30. ISBN 978-1-84701-162-6.
- — (2020). "Buchi Emecheta: The Burden of Exile". In Adebajo, Adekeye (ed.). The Pan-African Pantheon: Prophets, Poets and Philosophers. Jacana Media.
- As editor, with Chimalum Nwankwo (2021). New Perspectives on African Science and Speculative Fiction, "Speculative & Science Fiction" issue, African Literature Today 39. James Currey.
