= Catherine Obianuju Acholonu =

Nigerian writer (1951–2014)

- Born: 26 October 1951; Umuokwara, Orlu, Imo State, Nigeria
- Died: 18 March 2014 (aged 62); Imo State, Nigeria
- Education: University of Düsseldorf
- Known for: Nigerian author, researcher and political activist.

Catherine Obianuju Acholonu (26 October 1951 – 18 March 2014) was a Nigerian author, researcher and political activist. She served as the Senior Special Adviser to President Olusegun Obasanjo on Arts and Culture and was a founder-member of the Association of Nigerian Authors.

== Early life, marriage and education ==
Catherine Acholonu was born in an affluent Catholic Igbo family to Chief Lazarus Emejuru Olumba and Josephine Olumba, at Umuokwara Village, in the town of Orlu, Imo State, southeastern region of Nigeria. She was the eldest of four children. She completed her primary and secondary education in The Holy Rosary School, before being married off at the age of 17 to Brendan Douglas Acholonu, a surgeon from the same clan, who was then-settled in Germany. Catherine was subsequently enrolled at the University of Düsseldorf as a student of English, American literature, and Germanic linguistics in 1974, from where she post-graduated in 1977. In 1982, she obtained her PhD in Igbo Studies, thus becoming the first African Woman to earn both Masters' and PhD from Düsseldorf. She went on to attend her first conference at the Ibadan conference on Pan Africanism, next year, and presented four papers.

== Career ==
=== Academia ===
Acholonu taught at the English Department of Alvan Ikoku Federal College of Education, Owerri since 1978, and had authored over 16 books.

In 1982, she established AFA: A journal of Creative Writing which was the first journal concerned with African literature. In 1986 she was the only Nigerian, and one of the two Africans to participate in the United Nations Expert Group Meeting on "Women, Population and Sustainable Development: the Road to Rio, Cairo and Beijing”. In 1990, she was selected as a Fulbright Scholar by the US government (as a result of her documenting the Igbo roots of Olaudah Equiano, a famed abolitionist and slave autobiographer) and served as a visiting faculty to several private colleges. The African American Studies program was initiated in the Manhattanville College, as a result of her efforts.

She also co-founded the Catherine Acholonu Research Center to focus on historical revisionism centered on Pre-History of the African continent, in what was the first research initiative named after a Nigerian woman.

=== Politics ===
In 1992, she had unsuccessfully run for the post of Nigerian president as a candidate from National Republican Convention. During that time, her husband was the deputy-governor of Imo State from the same party.

From 1999, she served as the Senior Special Adviser to President Olusegun Obasanjo on Arts and Culture before resigning in 2002, to contest for the Orlu senatorial district seat of Imo State as a National Democratic Party candidate and re-enter active electoral politics. However, she lost to Arthur Nzeribe.

=== Works and reception ===
==== Poems ====
Acholonu has been widely held as to be one of the most notable female poets from Nigeria. Her poems have been included in the Heinemann Book of African Female Writers and other anthologies. Afro-Surrealist themes have been noted.

==== Western and Indigenous Traditions in Modern Igbo Literature ====
The book was an edited reprint of her PhD thesis by the Düsseldorf University Press; a typical trend in German Universities. Chidi T. Maduka, reviewing over Research in African Literatures, noted it to be an extremely poor agenda-driven work which failed to justify its central theme of English works in Igbo being a part of Igbo literature, and in the process, denounced any and all dissenting views from within academic circles using ad-hominem polemics lacking in logic. Ample misreading of scholars and serious flaws in bibliographic data were highlighted.

==== The Igbo Roots of Olaudah Equiano ====
Her first monograph, it exploited Igbo oral history to locate the ancestral home of Olaudah Equiano in Isseke, Ihiala. However, the findings were rejected near-unanimously, and her historiographic methods were widely criticized by other historians.

In a review in The Journal of African History, Elizabeth Isichei noted of Acholonu's book to be an enthusiastic venture in pseudo-history, with a genealogy that allotted ridiculous life-spans to many members of Equiano's family. In a review over Research in African Literatures, Paul Edwards dismissed the entire work as an essential exercise in speculation, which was bereft of any scholarly rigor. Ode Ogede penned a scathing critique of the work and noted of it to be an express example about how oral history can be abused to fulfill preset goals, without any veneer of scholarly rigor and objectivity; he also deemed her to be ignorant about recent studies concerning Olaudah Equiano's autobiography.

Christopher Fyfe, reviewing for the International Journal of African Historical Studies, noted it to be a fascinating contribution to African folk-history but also noted of Edward's critiques, and the presupposition of her findings on the validity of genealogical records assigning extraordinarily long time-spans to Equiano's relatives. Erving Beauregard of the University of Dayton deemed it as an interesting work, that made a plausible case for its central assertion despite her accepting oral testimonies from persons claiming to be 200 years old.

Acholonu had rejected her critics and has been accused of engaging in ad-hominem attacks against them.

==== Motherism : The Afrocentric Alternative to Feminism ====
Originating as her Fulbright Scholar Project, it has been since regarded as a pioneering work in the domain of African Gender Studies and has heavily influenced the development of maternal theory in Western nations. (For more details, see Philosophy section.)

==== Other works ====
Her disillusion with Al Gore's west-centric views on sustainable development led her to write the book The Earth Unchained: A Quantum Leap in Consciousness: a reply to Al Gore, which sought to rediscover Africa's lost knowledge and highlight its place in solving global issues. Acholonu claimed to have received the contents as a revelation from God in her dream, and allegedly wrote the entire book in about a fortnight.

They Lived Before Adam: Pre-Historic Origins of the Igbo won the Flora Nwapa Award for Literary Excellence and the Philis Wheatley Book Award at the Harlem Book Fair, 2009. The Gram Code of African Adam: Stone Books and Cave Libraries, reconstructing 450,000 Years of Africa's Lost Civilizations put forward a new transcription system for the Ikom monoliths, and claimed to have established the existence of indigenous writing systems in prehistoric Africa. Critical reception has been poor.

These works are not widely known outside of Nigeria.

== Philosophy ==
Acholonu self-identified as an environmental humanist, and rejected feminism. She disagreed with the thought-schools of Alice Walker, Buchi Emecheta, Flora Nwapa and other feminists, accusing them of harboring excessive misandry and radical concepts like lesbianism squarely situated outside the boundary of African morality, while glossing over the concepts of motherhood, central to African femininity. She instead asserted that it is not gender but rather economic status that determines power hierarchies in Africa. Thus, the concept of motherism that promotes a theme of "motherhood, nature and nurture"—it advocates for a return to traditional pro-natal womanhood, and promotes conciliatory stance rather than confrontations, as to male-female cooperation. Her views have been challenged by the later generation of African feminists.

Acholonu viewed the introduction of Islam into Africa as a form of colonialism, which subverted indigenous African systems and reduced the quality of life for native women.

== Death ==
Acholonu died on 18 March 2014, at the age of 62 from a year-long renal failure.

== Honours ==
She was enlisted among the greatest women achievers of Nigeria by the National Council of Women Societies (NCWS) in 1997. Her works have been selected as reading material for secondary schools and universities in Nigeria, and African Studies Departments of universities across America and Europe.

== Bibliography ==
=== Poems ===
- "Going Home"
- "Spring's Last Drop"
- "Dissidents"
- "Harvest of War"
- "Other Forms of Slaughter"

Collections

- The Spring's Last Drop, 1985
- Nigeria in the Year 1999, 1985
- Recite and Learn – Poems for Junior Primary Schools, 1986
- Recite and Learn – Poems for Senior Primary Schools, 1986

=== Drama and plays ===
- Trial of the Beautiful Ones: a play in one act, Owerri, Nigeria: Totan, 1985—based on the Igbo ogbanje myth.
- The Deal and Who is the Head of State, Owerri, Nigeria: Totan, 1986
- Into the Heart of Biafra: a play in three acts, Owerri, Nigeria: C. Acholonu, 1970

=== Essays and non-fiction ===
- Western and Indigenous Traditions in Modern Igbo Literature , 1985.
- Motherism, The Afrocentric Alternative to Feminism, 1995.
- The Igbo Roots of Olaudah Equiano, 1995, revised 2007.
- The Earth Unchained: A Quantum Leap in Consciousness: a reply to Al Gore, 1995.
- Africa the New Frontier – Towards a Truly Global Literary Theory for the 21st Century. Lecture Delivered to the Association of Nigerian Authors annual Convention, 2002.
- The Gram Code of African Adam: Stone Books and Cave Libraries, Reconstructing 450,000 Years of Africa's Lost Civilizations, 2005
- They Lived Before Adam: Pre-Historic Origins of the Igbo – The Never-Been-Ruled (Ndi Igbo since 1.6 million B.C.), 2009. Winner of the USA-based International Book Awards (2009) in the multi-cultural non-fiction category.
- The Lost Testament of the Ancestors of Adam: Unearthing Heliopolis/Igbo Ukwu – The Celestial City of the Gods of Egypt and India, 2010
- Eden in Sumer on the Niger: Archaeological, Linguistic, and Genetic Evidence of 450,000 Years of Atlantis, Eden and Sumer in West Africa, 2014

=== Books authored ===
- The Igbo Roots of Olaudah Equiano: An Anthropological Research. 1 January 1989
- The Deal and Who is the Head of State
- The Spring's Last Drop
- Nigeria in the year 1999 (TOT Series)
- Into the Heart of Biafra (TOP Series)
- Trial of the Beautiful Ones

=== Articles and chapters ===
- (with Joyce Ann Penfield), "Linguistic Processes of Lexical Innovation in Igbo." Anthropological Linguistics. 22 (1980). 118–130.
- "The Role of Nigerian Dancers in Drama." Nigeria Magazine. 53.1 (1985). 33–39.
- "The Home of Olaudah Equiano – A Linguistic and Anthropological Research", The Journal of Commonwealth Literature. 22.1 (1987). 5–16.
- "L'Igbo Langue Litteraire: Le Cas du Nigeria." [Literary Igbo Language: The Case of Nigeria.] Notre Librairie: Revue du Livre: Afrique, Caraibes, Ocean Indien. 98 (Jul–Sept 1989). 26–30.
- "Mother was a Great Man." In The Heinemann Book of African Women's Writing. Ed. Charlotte H. Bruner. London: Heinemann, 1993. 7–14.
- "Motherism: The Afrocentric Alternative to Feminism." Ishmael Reed's Konch Magazine. (March–April 2002).
