= Douglas Rimmer =

British economist and historian (1927–2004)

- Born: 29 April 1927
- Died: 10 September 2004 (aged 77)
- Occupations: Political economist and Africanist
- Awards: ASAUK Distinguished Africanist Award, 2001

Douglas Rimmer (29 April 1927 – 10 September 2004) was an economist and historian focusing on post-colonial West Africa. He first taught at the University College of the Gold Coast (now the University of Ghana at Legon) and was a founding member of the Centre of West African Studies at Birmingham University in 1963, where he became Director in 1983. Rimmer served the Royal African Society (RAS) for twenty years in various roles such as President (1986–1988). In 2001, he received the RAS/ASAUK Distinguished Africanist Award.

== Publications ==
Books Rimmer authored or edited include:

- Macromancy: The Ideology Of 'Development Economics'. London, Institute of Economic Affairs, 1973. Series: Hobart paper, 55
- Nigeria Since 1970: A Political And Economic Outline, with A. H. M. Kirk-Greene. New York : Africana Pub. Co., 1981
- Social science research methods : an African handbook, with Margaret Peil and Peter K. Mitchell. London : Hodder and Stoughton, [1982]
- The Economies of West Africa, New York : St. Martin's Press, 1984
- Rural Transformation In Tropical Africa, Athens : Ohio University Press, 1988
- Action In Africa: The Experience Of People Involved In Government, Business & Aid, London : Royal African Society in association with James Currey. Heinemann, Portsmouth, N.H., 1991
- Africa 30 years on, London : Royal African Society in association with James Currey. Heinemann, Portsmouth, N.H., 1991
- Staying Poor: Ghana's Political Economy, 1950–1990, Oxford; New York : Pergamon Press for the World Bank, 1992
- The British Intellectual Engagement With Africa In The Twentieth Century, with A. H. M. Kirk-Greene; Royal African Society. New York : St. Martin's Press, 2000.
