= Lynne Brydon =

British anthropologist and gender studies academic

Lynne Brydon is a British social scientist with a specialisation in gender studies. She is a senior honorary research fellow in the Department of African Studies and Anthropology at the University of Birmingham, England.

== Early life and education ==
Brydon studied social anthropology at New Hall (now Murray Edwards College, Cambridge), changing to this after one year studying natural sciences. After graduating in 1971 she spent a year teaching in Ghana with VSO, and then returned to Cambridge for her doctoral studies. Her thesis, completed after 16 months of fieldwork, was "Status ambiguity in Amedzofe-Avatime: women and men in a changing patrilineal society" (1976).

== Career ==
Brydon was a junior research fellow at Sidney Sussex College from 1975 to 1977, then a lecturer in social anthropology at the University of Liverpool before moving to the University of Birmingham's Centre of West African Studies (CWAS) in 1996.

CWAS became the Department of African Studies and Anthropology (DASA), and Brydon was its director in 2007-2008 when it became a member of AEGIS, the Africa-Europe Group for Interdisciplinary Studies. She was appointed as senior lecturer in 1998, and in 2008 became head of the School of History and Cultures when the university restructured its departments.

She was co-editor of the journal Ghana Studies, along with Takyiwaa Manuh, from 2003 to 2009, and was on the editorial board of Review of African Political Economy from the mid-1990s until 2008.

Her 1989 book Women in the Third World: gender issues in rural and urban areas, co-authored with Sylvia Chant, was originally compiled as teaching material for Liverpool social science finalists, and covers "a broad range of women' s issues across continents and regions", and covers four main themes of the household, reproduction, production, and policy.

== Selected publications ==
- Brydon, Lynne; Chant, Sylvia (1989). Women in the Third World: gender issues in rural and urban areas. Aldershot: Elgar. ISBN 9781852780593.
- Brydon, Lynne; Legge, Karen (1996). Adjusting society: the World Bank, the IMF, and Ghana. London: Tauris Academic Studies. ISBN 978-1-8606-4000-1.
