= Zack Williams =

Zack Williams may refer to:

- Zack Williams (actor) (1884–1958), American actor
- Zack Williams (American football) (born 1988), American football center
- Zack Williams (Canadian football) (born 1997), Canadian football offensive lineman

== See also ==
- Tunde Zack-Williams (Alfred Babatunde Zack-Williams, born 1945), British sociologist and Africanist
- Zach Williams (disambiguation), including people named Zachary or Zac Williams
