= John Fage =

British historian (1921–2002)

J.D. Fage
- Born: John Donnelly Fage; 3 June 1921; Teddington, Middlesex, United Kingdom
- Died: 6 August 2002 (aged 81); Machynlleth, Powys, United Kingdom
- Education: Cambridge University
- Occupation: Historian
- Writing career
- Subject: African history
- Notable work: A History of Africa (1978)

John Donnelly Fage FRHistS (3 June 1921 – 6 August 2002) was a British historian who was among the first academics to specialise in African history, especially of the pre-colonial period, in the United Kingdom and West Africa. He published a number of influential studies on West African history including Introduction to the History of West Africa (1955). He subsequently co-founded the Journal of African History, the first specialist academic journal in the field, with Roland Oliver in 1960.

== Career ==
=== Early life ===
John Fage was born in Teddington in Middlesex, England on 3 June 1921. He was educated at Tonbridge School and Magdalene College, Cambridge from 1939 where he studied history but his studies were interrupted by World War II. Fage was conscripted into the Royal Air Force (RAF) in 1942 and was posted to Southern Rhodesia (modern-day Zimbabwe) as part of the Commonwealth Air Training Plan. He served in several postings elsewhere on the continent, including in Madagascar. The experience sparked an interest in African history and he began research in the field on his return to Cambridge in 1945 where he lectured on European colonial expansion in Africa. He gained a doctorate at Cambridge in 1949 entitled "The achievement of self-government in Southern Rhodesia, 1898–1923". T.C. McCaskie noted that Fage "was part of a generation that emerged from the second world war into the optimistic ferment that surrounded both African decolonisation and British university expansion".

=== Ghana and SOAS ===
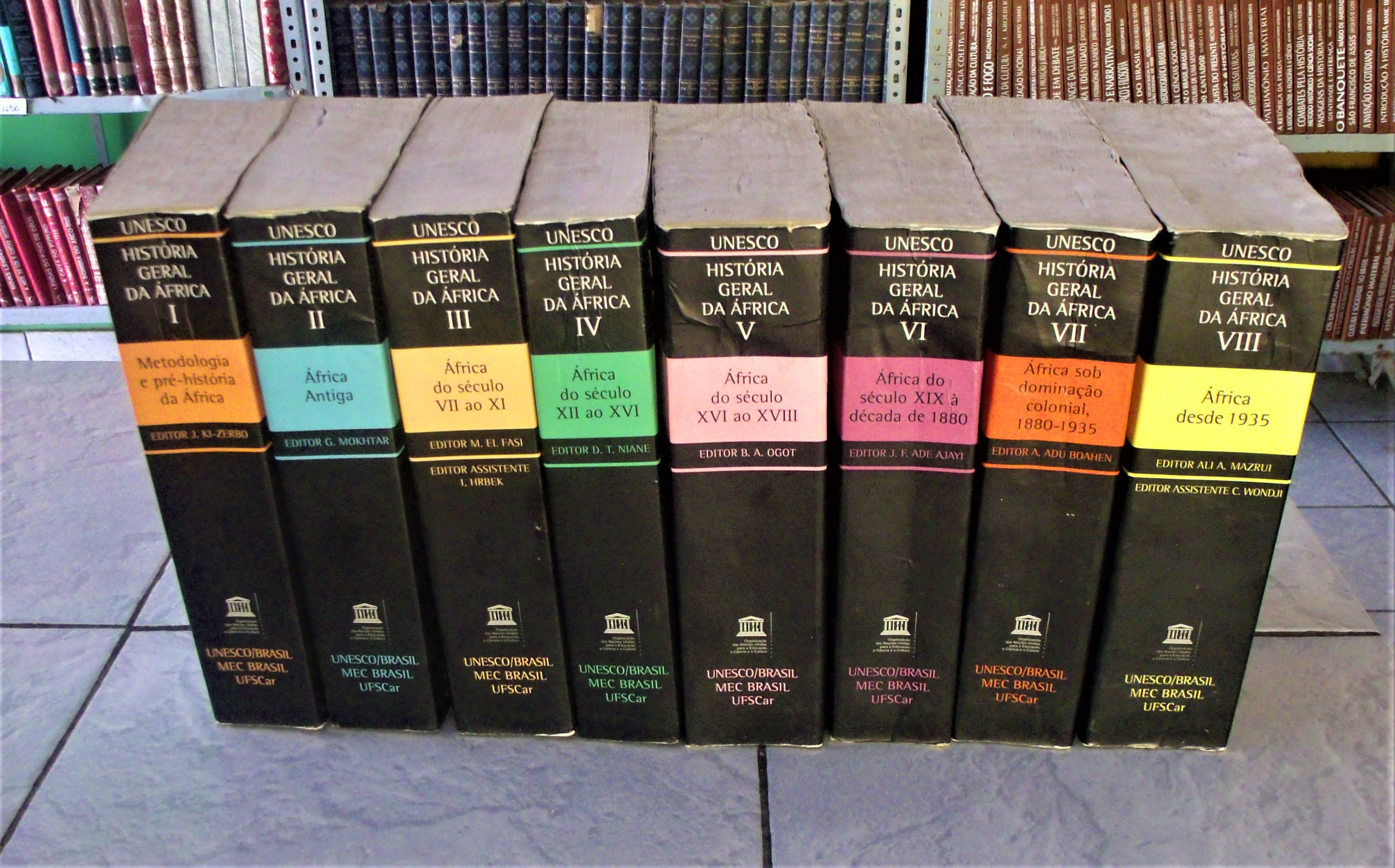
Among other influential series, Fage co-edited the General History of Africa (1981-93) published by UNESCO

In 1949, Fage took a post at the new University College of the Gold Coast in Accra, Gold Coast (modern-day Ghana) which was affiliated to the University of London. Rising through the academic hierarchy, he published Introduction to the History of West Africa (1955, later re-published as A History of West Africa) and Atlas of African History (1958) and A Short History of Africa (1962). After Ghana's independence, Fage became Deputy Principal of the then-University College of Ghana and helped to establish the Institute of African Studies at Legon. It was said:

During those years in Ghana, John Fage's interests had turned to what was then called the indigenous [pre-colonial] history of Africa. [...] In default of sufficient written material, archaeological and linguistic findings were drawn on, and use was made of the oral traditions which social anthropologist had reported but whose value for historical reconstruction could be exploited only through the skill of historians. Through his research and teaching at Legon, John Fage helped mightily in shifting the emphasis of African historical studies backwards in time from the colonial period - that phase 'sixty or at most eighty years' as he was later to right, 'in a period of recoverable history ten or more times as long'.

In 1959, Fage returned to the United Kingdom to take a post at the School of Oriental and African Studies (SOAS) in London alongside Roland Oliver with whom he collaborated on several publications. With Oliver, Fage founded the Journal of African History (JAH) in 1960 which he co-edited until 1973. The JAH was the first academic journal devoted to African studies in the United Kingdom and one of the first such specialist journals globally.

=== Birmingham and CWAS ===
Fage moved to the University of Birmingham in 1963 to establish the Centre of West African Studies (CWAS) which he directed for over twenty years. African studies expanded rapidly in the United Kingdom at the same time, and Fage became one of the founding members of the African Studies Association of the United Kingdom (ASAUK) in which he served as president (1968–69) before being elected an honorary member. Fage and Oliver were also general editors of The Cambridge History of Africa (1975–86) and Fage also co-edited the General History of Africa (1981–93) published by UNESCO. Fage also published A History of Africa (1978) for The History of Human Society series.

Fage chaired the United Kingdom National Commission for UNESCO (1966–83) and was a committee member of the International African Institute and a Fellow of the Royal Historical Society. His academic career culminated in his appointment as Vice-Principal of the University of Birmingham. Fage retired in 1984 and moved to Wales. He was a joint recipient of ASAUK's "Distinguished Africanist Award" in 2001 and his memoir entitled To Africa and Back was published in 2002. He died, aged 81, at Machynlleth on 6 August 2002.

== See also ==
- Basil Davidson - an early popular historian who wrote on African history in the same period
- Albert Adu Boahen - an early Ghanaian historian who collaborated with Fage on several projects
