= Gavin Williams (sociologist) =

Africanist, sociologist and political economist

- Born: 1943 (age 82–83); Pretoria, South Africa
- Education: University of Stellenbosch; University of Oxford
- Occupations: Africanist, sociologist and political economist

Gavin P. Williams (born in Pretoria in 1943) is an Africanist, sociologist, and political economist. Since 2010, he has been an Emeritus Fellow of St Peter's College, Oxford, where he previously taught politics and sociology from 1975 until 2010. After graduating from the University of Stellenbosch with a BA degree, Williams wrote his B. Phil. thesis with a Rhodes Scholarship at the University of Oxford, on the political sociology of Western Nigeria. At Durham University he lectured on sociology during 1967 to 1970 and 1972 to 1975. He was a research fellow at the University of Sussex and associate at the Nigerian Institute Of Social And Economic Research (NISER), Ibadan from 1970 to 1972. On examination of his published work, he received a D. Litt. degree from Rhodes University in South Africa in 2013. From 1990 Williams has taught and performed research at several South African universities, such as Rhodes University.

Williams was awarded the 2013/2014 ASAUK Distinguished Africanist Award. He was one of the founding editors of the Review of African Political Economy in the early 1970s, which published a special issue honouring Williams in 2012.

== Publications ==
Gavin Williams published many scholarly articles and books including:

- with De Kadt, Emanuel Jehuda: Sociology and development, Tavistock Publications : Harper & Row, Barnes & Noble, London, 1974.
- Nigeria : economy and society, Collings, London, 1976.
- State and Society in Nigeria, Afrografika Publishers, University of California, 1980. eBook, Malthouse Press Ltd, Nigeria, Oxford, 2019.
- with Heyer, Judith and Robert, Pepe: Introduction, and Eds. Rural Development, Conference 1980 at the University of the Witwatersrand, African Studies Seminar. Macmillan, 1981.
- Inequalities in rural Nigeria, School of Development Studies, University of East Anglia, Norwich, 1981.
- with Allen, Chris: Sociology of Developing Societies: Sub-Saharan Africa, Macmillan Press, London, 1982.
- with Kiloh, Margaret and Willmer, John: The origins of the Nigerian civil war, Open University Press, Milton Keynes, 1983.
- Namibia, writing for liberation, Namibia Support Committee. Review of African Political Economy, London, Sheffield, 1987.
- Land and freedom : capitalism and peasantries in Africa, Institute of Social Studies, The Hague, 1992
- Setting the Agenda: A Critique of the World Bank's Rural Restructuring Programme for South Africa, Journal of Southern African Studies, 22(1996), 139-166. In Special Issue: State and Development.
- Fragments of democracy : nationalism, development and the state in Africa, HSRC Publishers, Cape Town, South Africa, 2003.
- with Beckman, Björn: Democracy, labour, and politics in Africa and Asia, Centre for Research and Documentation (CRD), Kano [Nigeria], 2004.
