= MCskill ThaPreacha =

Nigerian rapper and songwriter (born 1989)

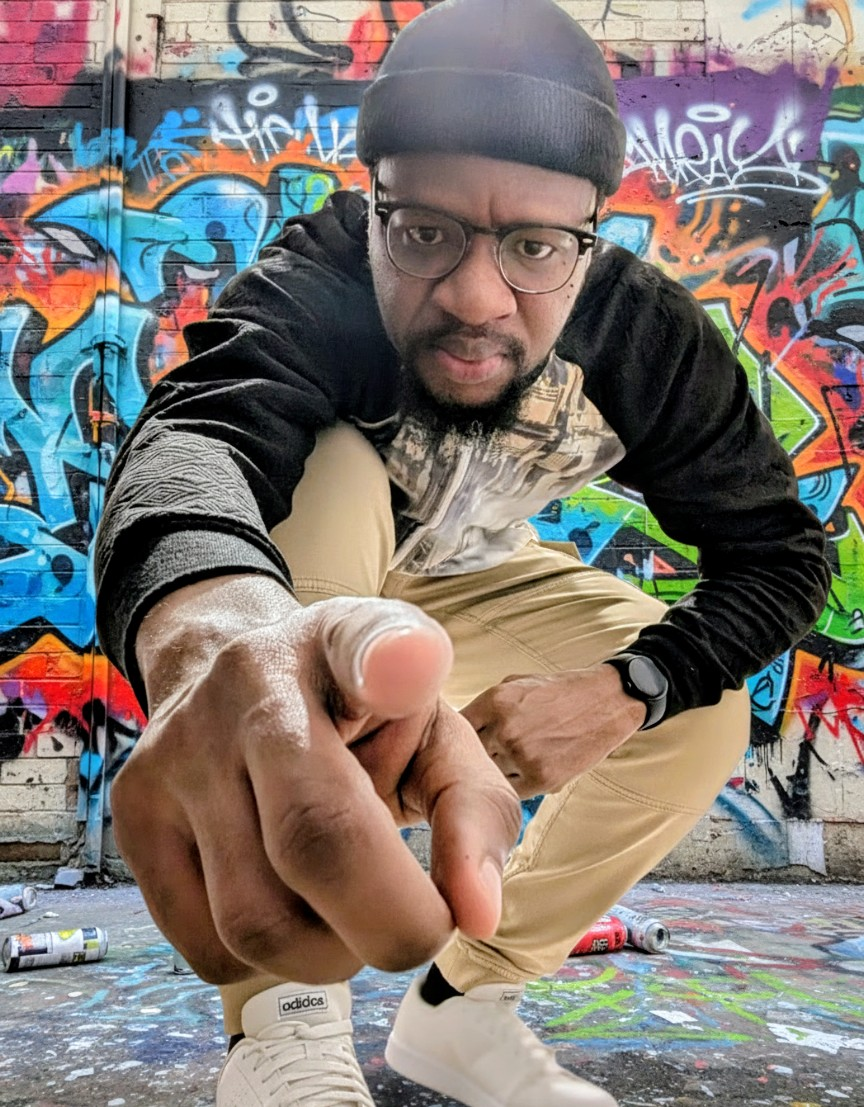
- MCskill ThaPreacha in 2025

Background information
- Born: Olawale Aremo; April 4, 1989 (age 37); Lagos State, Nigeria
- Education: Birmingham City University
- Genres: Conscious hip hop, Rap
- Occupations: Rapper; songwriter
- Years active: 2010-present
- Website: https://mcthapreacha.com

Olawale Aremo (born 4 April 1989), known professionally as MCskill ThaPreacha, is a Nigerian rapper and songwriter. Active since the early 2010s, he is known for his socially conscious lyrical style, often categorized as "boom bap" hip hop. His contributions to the genre are analyzed in an Oxford University Press study of Nigerian hip hop.

== Early life and background ==
Aremo was born and raised in Ikeja, Lagos. In a 2016 feature for the German hip hop publication Juice Magazin, he stated that he began writing lyrics at age thirteen, influenced by radio broadcasts and cassette tapes. He recorded his first demo in 2004 before pursuing music professionally in 2010.

== Career ==
=== 2010-2017 ===
MCskill ThaPreacha began his recording career in the early 2010s with a series of independent releases. In 2016, he was featured in Juice Magazin, which described him as "one of the most exciting Nigerian artists currently" while noting the country's growing influence on the genre. His album Diary of a Supernatural, released that same year, received critical attention, including a review by RAPstation which highlighted the project's production quality and lyrical themes.

In 2017, he released the single Man in the Mirror. Vanguard described the song as a track focused on civic and political commentary. That same year, he appeared on Channels Television to discuss the challenges of media visibility and commercialization within the Nigerian hip hop industry.

=== 2018-2020 ===
In 2018, Aremo released the album The 9th Chapter, which was featured in OkayAfrica's weekly music selection. The project included guest appearances from comedian Lasisi Elenu and singer Justina Lee Brown. Reviewing the album for Pulse Nigeria, music critic Motolani Alake gave it 3 out of 5 stars; he praised the album's classic boom bap production and tracklist but noted its lack of a cohesive thematic narrative, ultimately describing it as a "flawed, yet enjoyable listen." The following year, he collaborated with veteran Nigerian lyricist Modenine, appearing on the track "Level IX" from Modenine's 2019 album The Monument. He also released the Nucleus EP series in 2019.

=== 2020-present ===
Following his 2019 releases, Aremo shifted his focus from recording to music technology and education. According to a 2025 The Punch feature, he remained active in the industry as a leading contributor to the lyrics platform Musixmatch. He reportedly became the platform's first Curator Specialist to surpass one million contribution points, managing lyrics for over 70,000 songs globally.

During this same period, he relocated to the United Kingdom and completed a Master's degree in Artificial intelligence at Birmingham City University. In late 2025, he announced his intention to return to recording music in 2026, citing his academic and curatorial work as key factors in his creative development.

== Academic coverage ==
In the 2025 book Nigerian Hip-Hop: Race, Knowledge, and the Poetics of Resistance by Tosin Gbogi, published by Oxford University Press, Aremo's work is analyzed as a case study in "African-centered" hip hop narratives. The author examines his lyrics, specifically a jingle recorded for the Rap Kulture show on Rhythm 93.7 FM Lagos, which argues that hip hop's elements originated in ancient African history before flourishing in the Bronx. The text highlights his ideological alignment with KRS-One, noting that he frames rap music as a modern continuation of traditional Yoruba poetic forms like ewi.

== Discography ==
=== Studio albums ===
- Diary of a Supernatural (2016)
- The 9th Chapter (2018)

=== Mixtapes ===
- Metaphysical Induction (2011)
- Get Dope Or Die Wack (2012)
- Project-X (with MC Magic Man) (2013)
- Free Throws (2013)
- Free Throws 2 (2014)
- The Season (with Stormatique) (2015)
- Covers & Freestyles, Vol. 1 (2020)
- Covers & Freestyles, Vol. 2 (2020)

=== Extended plays ===
- Supernat Over Preemo (2016)
- Nucleus, Vol. 1 (with Teck-Zilla) (2019)
- Nucleus, Vol. 2 (with Stormatique) (2019)
