= Tosin Gbogi =

Nigerian literary scholar and poet

Tosin Gbogi (born Michael Tosin Gbogi) is a Nigerian literary scholar, linguist, poet and cultural critic. He is an assistant professor of English at the University of Minnesota, Twin Cities, where his research and teaching spans African and African diaspora literatures, poetry and poetics, popular culture, and postcolonial and decolonial theory. Gbogi is the author of Nigerian Hip-Hop: Race, Knowledge, and the Poetics of Resistance published in 2025 by Oxford University Press.

== Early life and education ==
Gbogi grew up in southwestern Nigeria in a household steeped in hip-hop culture. One of brothers performed as part of a rap duo, and Gbogi has credited this early exposure to rhyme-writing and performance as his introduction to poetry in its spoken, chanted and written forms. He earned a Bachelor of Arts degree in English Studies from Adekunle Ajasin University in Akungba, Nigeria, and an MA in English literature from Anglia Ruskin University in Cambridge, UK. Gbogi went on to pursue doctoral studies in the Interdisciplinary Program in Linguistics at Tulane University in New Orleans, holding a Fulbright Scholarship. His doctoral dissertation was entitled "'Out of Naija, Straight from Naija': Language, Performativity and Identity in Nigerian Hip Hop Music."

== Career ==
Before completing his PhD, Gbogi taught in the Department of English Studies at Adekunle Ajasin University, and worked as an arts editor at Kraft Books, a Nigerian publishing house based in Ibadan. He later taught in the Africana Studies Program and the School of Professional Advancement at Tulane University. In 2019, Gbogi joined Marquette University in Milwaukee, Wisconsin as an assistant professor of English and Africana Studies, before moving to the English department at the University of Minnesota, Twin Cities in the fall of 2025.

== Poetry ==
Gbogi's debut poetry collection, the tongues of a shattered s-k-y (Blackgraphics, 2012) is set in an imagined nation called "airegin" and it captures the pains and agonies of life in that land. His second collection, locomotifs and other songs (Noirledge, 2018) engages themes such as governance in Nigeria and the 2014 Chibok schoolgirls kidnapping. In 2013, Gbogi co-edited One Poem, Fifty Seasons, a poetry anthology produced by the Ondo State chapter of the Association of Nigerian Authors.

== Scholarship and recognition ==
Gbogi's scholarly works have appeared in peer-reviewed journals such as Matatu: Journal for African Culture and Society, Pragmatics and Neohelicon. His first academic monograph, Nigerian Hip-Hop: Race, Knowledge, and the Poetics of Resistance (OUP, 2025) has been described as the "first sustained examination of hip-hop in Nigeria". The book was awarded the Best Book Prize of the African Studies Association of the United Kingdom at the association's conference in September 2026. Drawing on lyrics, music videos, cover art, archival materials and interviews with figures central to the culture, the book positions Nigerian hip-hop as both a literary form rooted in African oral poetic traditions and a site of decolonial thought and social change.

Months earlier, Gbogi's research essay, "Ears to the Ground: Realness, Decolonial Meta-Rap and the Language Debate in Nigerian Hip-Hop," earned him the 2026 Abioseh Porter Best Essay Award of the African Literature Association "for an outstanding article published in African literary studies."

Gbogi has presented his research papers and delivered keynotes at scholarly conferences, and serves on the editorial board of academic journals, including Àgídìgbo: ABUAD Journal of the Humanities.

== Selected academic works ==
Gbogi, Tosin. Nigerian Hip-Hop: Race, Knowledge, and the Poetics of Resistance (Oxford University Press, 2025).

Gbogi, Tosin. "Ears to the ground: Realness, decolonial meta-rap, and the language debate in Nigerian hip-hop." Journal of African Cultural Studies 36, no. 3 (2024): 365–380.

Gbogi, Tosin. "Against Afropolitanism: Race and the Black migrant body in contemporary African poetry." Literature, Critique, and Empire Today 59, no. 2-3 (2024): 239–263.

Gbogi, Tosin. "Place and the postcolonial poetry of Nigeria." Journal of Postcolonial Writing 58, no. 3 (2022), 293–307.

Gbogi, Tosin. "When Power Swallows its Grace: Poetics, Politics, and Performance in Postcolonial Nigeria." Folklore 132, no. 3 (2021): 268–289.

Gbogi, Tosin. "'Is There Life Besides 'Coloniality?'": Metapoetics and the Second Level of Decoloniality in Niyi Osundare's Poetry." Research in African Literatures 52, no. 3 (2021): 139-166.

Gbogi, Michael Tosin. "Language, identity, and urban youth subculture: Nigerian hip hop music as an exemplar." Pragmatics 26, no. 2 (2016): 171–195.

Gbogi, Michael Tosin. "Contesting Meanings in the Postmodern Age: The Example of Nigerian Hip Hop Music." Matatu 48, no. 2 (2016): 335–362.
