= John Lonsdale (disambiguation) =

John Lonsdale (1788–1867) was a British bishop.

John Lonsdale may also refer to:

- John Lonsdale, 1st Baron Armaghdale (1850–1924), British businessman and politician
- John Lowther, 1st Viscount Lonsdale (1655–1700), English politician
- John Lonsdale (historian) (born 1937), Emeritus Professor, University of Cambridge and Africanist
- John Lonsdale, Australian senior public servant and Chair of APRA
