= International African Institute =

The International African Institute (IAI) was founded (as the International Institute of African Languages and Cultures - IIALC) in 1926 in London for the study of African languages, society, history, and culture. Frederick Lugard was the first chairman (1926 to his death in 1945); Diedrich Hermann Westermann (1926 to 1939) and Maurice Delafosse (1926) were the initial co-directors. Since 1928, the IAI has published a quarterly journal, Africa. Additional publications include the Journal of African Cultural Studies, African Bibliography, Research and Documentation, African Arguments series, the International African Library, and Readings in ... series. For some years in the 1950s to 1970s, the assistant editor was the novelist Barbara Pym.

In 1946 the Italian ethnologist Vinigi Grottanelli joined the Executive Board, and remained a participant until 1968.

The IAI's mission is "to promote the education of the public in the study of Africa and its languages and cultures". Its operations includes seminars, journals, monographs, edited volumes and stimulating scholarship within Africa.

== Publications ==
The IAI has been involved in scholarly publishing since 1927. Scholars whose work has been published by the institute include Emmanuel K. Akyeampong, Samir Amin, Karin Barber, Alex de Waal, Patrick Chabal, Mary Douglas, E. E. Evans-Pritchard, Jack Goody, Jane Guyer, Monica Hunter, Bronislaw Malinowski, Z. K. Matthews, D. A. Masolo, Achille Mbembe, Thomas Mofolo, John Middleton, Simon Ottenberg, J. D. Y. Peel, Mamphela Ramphele, Isaac Schapera, Monica Wilson and V. Y. Mudimbe.

IAI publications fall into a number of series, notably International African Library and International African Seminars. The International African Library is published from volume 41 (2011) by Cambridge University Press; Volumes 7–40 are available from Edinburgh University Press. As of November 2016, there are 49 volumes.

== Archives ==
The archives of the International African Institute are held at the Archives Division of the Library of the London School of Economics. An online catalogue of these papers is available.

== History ==
=== Africa alphabet ===
In 1928, the IAI (then IIALC) published an "Africa Alphabet" to facilitate standardization of Latin-based writing systems for African languages.

=== Prize for African-language literature, 1929–50 ===
From April 1929 to 1950, the IAI offered prizes for works of literature in African languages.

=== List of chairmen ===
- 1926–1945: Frederick Lugard, 1st Baron Lugard; first chairman
- 1945–1949: Francis Rodd, 2nd Baron Rennell
- 1949–1957: Sir John Waddington
