= Roland Oliver =

Indian-born English academic

Roland Oliver FBA
- Born: Roland Anthony Oliver; March 30, 1923; Srinagar, Jammu and Kashmir
- Died: February 9, 2014 (aged 90); Frilsham, Berkshire, England
- Spouse(s): Caroline Oliver (d. 1983); Suzanne Miers (1990–)

Academic background
- Education: Stowe School; University of Cambridge
- Doctoral advisor: Norman Sykes

Academic work
- Discipline: History
- Sub-discipline: History of Africa; African studies
- Doctoral students: David Birmingham

Roland Anthony Oliver FBA (30 March 1923 – 9 February 2014) was an English academic and emeritus professor of African history at the University of London.

== Biography ==
Oliver was born in Srinagar, the summer capital of the princely state of Jammu and Kashmir in the British Raj in 1923. Educated at Stowe School, he read English at King's College, Cambridge until the outbreak of World War II. He served as a cryptographer at Bletchley Park during the course of the war, and returned to the University of Cambridge to study history. His doctoral research was supervised by Norman Sykes.

In 1948, Roland Oliver joined the staff of the School of Oriental and African Studies (SOAS) at the University of London, where he was successively lecturer, reader and professor until his retirement in 1986. His appointment marked the beginning of the contemporary academic field of African history. The African History Seminar that he founded and chaired at the School of Oriental and African Studies (SOAS) became the most important venue for the advancement of the academic discipline of African history anywhere in the world, and has profoundly influenced all subsequent scholarship on the subject. The archive of papers presented at the seminar was later destroyed.

He travelled extensively throughout Africa in 1949–50 and 1957–58 and visited the continent almost every year since then. In 1953, 1957 and 1961 he organised international conferences on African history and archaeology, which did much to establish the subject as an academic discipline.

He was a founding editor, with John Fage, in 1960 of the Journal of African History and, again with John Fage, in 1960 of the Cambridge History of Africa which appeared in eight volumes between 1975 and 1986.

He sat on the Council of the Royal African Society from 1959 to 1965, and on the Council of the Institute of Race Relations from 1959 to 1969. At the 25th International Congress of Orientalists in Moscow in 1960, he joined Melville J. Herskovits and Ivan Potekhin in helping establish the independent International Congress of African Studies, which convened four times. In 1963, he carried out a survey of 250 working Africanist academics in the United Kingdom and founded the African Studies Association of the United Kingdom (ASAUK) itself. He became its fourth President in 1966–67. He was among the founders of the Minority Rights Group in 1969.

Oliver was visiting professor at the University of Brussels (1961), Northwestern University (1962), and Harvard University (1967). From 1979 to 1993, he was president of the British Institute in Eastern Africa.

The Cambridge History of Africa and his influential Oxford History of East Africa were produced in a decade between the late 1970s and late 1980s. These histories recognised and celebrated the long, rich history of Africa, which for the first half of the 20th century was previously thought by historians to have only a history "created" by white travellers, administrators and settlers.

In 1993, Oliver was elected a Fellow of the British Academy, and in 2004, he was awarded the Distinguished Africanist Award of the African Studies Association of the United Kingdom (ASAUK).

He died on 9 February 2014 at the age of 90 in Frilsham, Berkshire, England.

== Books ==
- The Missionary Factor in East Africa, 1952.
- Sir Harry Johnston and the Scramble for Africa, 1957.
- The Dawn of African History (editor), 1961.
- A Short History of Africa (with John Fage), 1962, 6th edition 1988.
- History of East Africa. Volume I (co-editor with Gervase Mathew), 1963.
- The Middle Age of African History (editor), 1967.
- Africa since 1800 (with Anthony Atmore) 1967.
- Africa in the Iron Age (with Brian Fagan) 1975.
- The African Middle Ages (with Anthony Atmore) 1981.
- The African Experience: From Olduvai Gorge to the 21st Century, 1991; revised 1999.
- In the Realms of Gold: Pioneering in African History, 1997.

== Personal life ==
His first marriage to Caroline ended with her death in 1983. He re-married to Suzanne Miers, a fellow historian of Africa, in 1990.
