= The Cambridge History of Africa =

- Cover of Volume 1: From the Earliest Times to c.500 B.C.
- Editors: John Donnelly Fage; Roland Oliver
- Language: English
- Subject: History of Africa
- Published: 1975–86 (Cambridge University Press)
- Publication place: England
- Media type: Print (1975–86); Digital (March 2008)
- OCLC: 3034730

The Cambridge History of Africa is an illustrated, eight-volume history of Africa published by Cambridge University Press between 1975 and 1986. Each volume is edited by a different person; the general editors of the series are John Donnelly Fage and Roland Oliver.

Cambridge University Press published e-book editions in March 2008.

== Reception ==
- The UNESCO collective tasked with writing the General History of Africa criticised the Cambridge history for not challenging colonial narratives.
- Paul Tiyambe Zeleza writes that the Cambridge history had very little information on women.

== Volumes ==
1. Clark, J. Desmond, ed. (1982). The Cambridge History of Africa, Volume 1: From the Earliest Times to c.500 B.C. Cambridge University Press. ISBN 978-0-521-22215-0. OCLC 885618126.
2. Donnelly Fage, John, ed. (1979). The Cambridge History of Africa, Volume 2: From c.500 B.C. to A.D. 1050. Cambridge University Press. ISBN 978-0-521-21592-3. OCLC 59023418.
3. Oliver, Roland, ed. (1977). The Cambridge History of Africa, Volume 3: From c.1050 to c.1600. Cambridge University Press. ISBN 978-0-521-20981-6. OCLC 59023418.
4. Gray, Richard, ed. (1975). The Cambridge History of Africa, Volume 4: From c.1600 to c.1790. Cambridge University Press. ISBN 978-0-521-20413-2. OCLC 222963183.
5. Flint, John E., ed. (1977). The Cambridge History of Africa, Volume 5: From c.1790 to c.1870. ISBN 978-1-139-05459-1. OCLC 837973030.
6. Oliver, Roland; Sanderson, G. N., eds. (1985). The Cambridge History of Africa, Volume 6: From 1870 to 1905. Cambridge University Press. ISBN 978-0-521-22803-9. OCLC 59237801.
7. Roberts, A. D., ed. (1986). The Cambridge History of Africa, Volume 7: From 1905 to 1940. Cambridge University Press. ISBN 978-0-521-22505-2. OCLC 875518780.
8. Crowder, Michael, ed. (1984). The Cambridge History of Africa, Volume 8: From c.1940 to c.1975. Cambridge University Press. ISBN 978-0-521-22409-3. OCLC 12309947.

== See also ==
- The Cambridge History of South Africa
- UNESCO's General History of Africa, published 1981-1993
