= J. D. Y. Peel =

British Africanist, sociologist and historian

J. D. Y. Peel FBA
- Born: John David Yeadon Peel; 11 November 1941; Dumfries, Dumfries and Galloway, United Kingdom
- Died: 2 November 2015 (aged 73); London, United Kingdom
- Education: University of Oxford; London School of Economics
- Occupations: Africanist, sociologist, historian of Africa
- Spouse(s): Jennifer Parre Anne Obigbo (m. 2014–2015)
- Writing career
- Subjects: History and religion in Nigeria

John David Yeadon Peel FBA (11 November 1941 – 2 November 2015) was a British Africanist, sociologist and historian of religion in Africa, particularly Nigeria. He was most notable for his series of major studies of historical patterns of religious belief among the Yoruba people.

== Biography ==
John David Yeadon Peel was born in Dumfries, Scotland, on 11 November 1941 and was educated at King Edward's School, Birmingham and Balliol College, Oxford. He gained a doctorate in sociology from the London School of Economics (LSE) on Independent Churches in Nigeria. He held a succession of academic posts at universities in the United Kingdom and Nigeria, finishing his career at the School of Oriental and African Studies (SOAS). As well as African subjects, he retained an interest in the history of sociology and taught social theory. He authored a biography of the sociologist Herbert Spencer in 1971.

Peel was one of the first scholars to examine the theology and organisation of African independent churches. Paul Gifford wrote that "[his] thrust was generally Weberian, insisting that religion could not be reduced to material or class interests". He published three cumulative works on religious change among the Yoruba people in Nigeria between 1968 and 2015, exploring aspects of Christianity, Islam and indigenous belief among the Yoruba from the pre-colonial period onwards. Robin W. G. Horton's "intellectualist theory" of African religion was first set out in a review of Peel's 1968 volume.

Peel was a fellow and vice-president (1999-2000) of the British Academy and president of the African Studies Association of the United Kingdom (ASAUK; 1996–98). He was awarded the ASAUK's "Distinguished Africanist" award in 2015. He was editor of Africa: Journal of the International Africa Institute from 1979 to 1986. Toyin Falola edited a festschrift in Peel's honour entitled Christianity and Social Change in Africa in 2005.

Peel died in London on 2 November 2015 and was buried on the eastern side of Highgate Cemetery.

== Selected publications ==
- Aladura: a Religious Movement among the Yoruba (Oxford: Oxford University Press, 1968)
- Ijeshas and Nigerians: the Incorporation of a Yoruba Kingdom 1890s-1970s (Cambridge: Cambridge University Press, 1984)
- Religious Encounter and the Making of the Yoruba (Bloomington: Indiana University Press, 2000)
- Christianity, Islam and the Orisa: Comparative Studies of Three Religions in Interaction and Transformation (Oakland: University of California Press, 2015).
