= Eldred D. Jones =

Sierra Leonean academic (1925–2020)

Professor Eldred D. Jones
- Born: Eldred Durosimi Jones; 6 January 1925; Freetown, British Sierra Leone
- Died: 21 March 2020 (aged 95); Freetown, Sierra Leone
- Education: CMS Grammar School, Freetown; Fourah Bay College; Corpus Christi College, Oxford' University of Durham
- Occupations: Literary critic, university professor, university principal
- Writing career
- Notable awards: ASAUK Distinguished Africanist Award, 2002

Professor Eldred Durosimi Jones (6 January 1925 – 21 March 2020) was a Sierra Leonean academic and literary critic, known for his book Othello's Countrymen: A Study of Africa in the Elizabethan and Jacobean Drama. He was a principal of Fourah Bay College. Jones died in Freetown, Sierra Leone, on Saturday, 21 March 2020.

== Biography ==
Eldred Durosimi Jones was born on 6 January 1925 to Sierra Leone Creole parents. On his maternal side, Jones descended from the Jamaican Maroons and an Irish great-grandfather. Jones attended the CMS Grammar School, Freetown, and Fourah Bay College (1944–47), completing a Bachelor of Arts degree. He studied in England at Corpus Christi College, Oxford (1950–53) and the main campus of the University of Durham (1962).

In 1968, he became the first editor of the journal African Literature Today, continuing in the role for more than three decades.

His critical works include Othello's Countrymen: A Study of the African in Elizabethan and Jacobean Drama (Oxford University Press, 1985), The Writing of Wole Soyinka (Heinemann, 1973), and The Elizabethan Image of Africa (University of Virginia for the Folger Shakespeare Library, 1971). Jones was also the author of The Freetown Bond: A Life under Two Flags (James Currey, 2012) with the help of his wife Marjorie Jones.

In 2002, Jones was honoured with the Distinguished Africanist Award from the African Studies Association of the United Kingdom (ASAUK).

Eldred Jones died on 21 March 2020, at the age of 95.
