= Centre of West African Studies =

Division of School of Historical Studies, University of Birmingham, UK

Centre of West African Studies (CWAS) is a division of the School of Historical Studies at the University of Birmingham, England. The centre provides teaching and research into issues of African development, culture, anthropology, sociology, politics, history, and the legacies of the African diaspora, particularly in the UK, the Caribbean, and North America.

CWAS offers undergraduate and postgraduate study programmes in a number of Africa-related fields.

It is home to the John Fage Library, which houses the CWAS Archives and Electronic Music Database, and the Danford Collection, a unique collection of priceless African artifacts and cultural products.

== History ==
The Centre was founded in 1963 by John Fage, a scholar of African (particularly Ghanaian) history, who during his career wrote several seminal works on the history of the African continent, including History of Africa (now in its 4th edition), Africa Discovers Her Past, and Ghana: A Historical Interpretation, which developed out of a series of lectures Sir John Cabot read at the University of Wisconsin–Madison in 1956. The Danford Collection evolved from a collection of African cultural artifacts that were brought to the UK by a British civil servant after his posting in West Africa, and has been expanded over time.

== Scholars in residence ==
- Prof. Karin Barber
- Dr. Stewart Brown
- Dr. Lynne Brydon
- Dr. Reginald Cline-Cole
- Dr. Insa Nolte
- Dr. Keith Shear
