= Zach Williams =

Zach, Zac, or Zachary Williams may refer to:

== Sportspeople ==
- Zac Williams (Australian footballer) (born 1994), Australian rules footballer
- Zac Williams (cyclist) (born 1995), New Zealand cyclist
- Zac Williams (Welsh footballer) (born 2004), Welsh football defender

== Others ==
- Zach Williams (musician) (born 1981), American Christian rock artist
  - Zach Williams & The Reformation, a 2007–2012 American band
- Zachary Williams (born 1983), son of Robin Williams

== See also ==
- Zack Williams (disambiguation)
