= M. Ershadul Bari =

M. Ershadul Bari (1952-9 November 2013) was a Bangladeshi academic and law professor. He is the former vice-chancellor of Bangladesh Open University.

== Early life ==
Bari was born on 1 July 1952 in Bogra District, East Pakistan, Pakistan. His father was Abdul Hasanat Muhammad Abdur Rashid and mother was Abeda Khatoon. He completed his bachelor's and then double master's in law and economics at the University of Rajshahi. He completed his PhD at the SOAS School of Law in 1985. He completed his post-doc research at the SOAS School of Law with a Commonwealth Professional Fellowships.

== Career ==
Bari joined the University of Rajshahi as a lecturer on 19 September 1977. He joined the University of Dhaka as a lecturer of law on 4 June 1988. From 2 July 1988 to 1 July 1991, he was the chairman of the department of law at the University of Dhaka. He then served as the Dean of the Faculty of Law for 11 years. He was the provost of Muktizoddah Ziaur Rahman Hall from 9 June 1994 to 8 June 1997.

Bari was a member of the 1992 National Labour Law Commission. He was the vice-chair (South Asia) of the International Union for Conservation of Nature Commission on Environmental Law. On 10 December 2001, he was appointed the vice-chancellor of Bangladesh Open University. He founded the law department of the Bangladesh Open University.

Bari was reappointed for a second term as the vice-chancellor of Bangladesh Open University in December 2005. He spoke at an event organized by the Jatiya Nagarik Forum, a pro-Bangladesh Nationalist Party platform, where he said the election could be delayed by the caretaker government if there was a natural disaster. Bangladesh Open University staff held two journalists for seven hours because they were photographing trees being cut on campus. It was alleged Bari was involved in financial irregularities over the tree removal.

Bari was the vice-president of the Bangladesh Jamiyat Ahl-Al Hadith, an Islamist political party. In March 2007, he left the post of vice-chancellor of Bangladesh Open University. He joined the University of Malaya as a law professor in March 2010.

In April 2010, the University of Dhaka fired Bari, Professor M Ataur Rahman, Professor Mohammad Aminur Rahman, Associate Professor Mohammad Nurul Huda, and Professor Mohammad Hamid Uddin for taking an "unauthorised leave".

In March 2012, the Bangladesh High Court summoned Bari after Pro-Vice Chancellor Prof Harun-or Rashid sued Bari for distorting history of the Bangladesh Liberation War in books he had written for Bangladesh Open University students in 2000. He did not appear before the court as he was in Malaysia and the court found him in contempt. Kamrunnahar Rumi of Chief Metropolitan Magistrate's Court issued an arrest warrant against him.

== Personal life ==
Bari's son, M. Ehteshamul Bari, is a faculty of the Thomas More Law School at the Australian Catholic University.

== Death ==
Bari died on 9 November 2013 in Malaysia.
