= Paulo de Moraes Farias =

Brazilian historian and Africanist (1935–2026)

Paulo de Moraes Farias FBA
- Born: 1935
- Died: 2026 (aged 90–91)
- Education: Federal University of Bahia; University of Ghana

Paulo Fernando de Moraes Farias (1935–2026), FBA, was a Brazilian historian and Africanist specialising in epigraphic sources for the medieval history (5th to the 15th century) of West Africa as well as West African oral traditions and the Timbuktu Chronicles. Since his retirement in 2003, he was Honorary Professor at the Department of African Studies and Anthropology at the University of Birmingham.

After graduating from the Federal University of Bahia, Brazil, in 1963, Moreas Farias taught at Bahia's Centre for Afro-Oriental Studies and at the Central College of Salvador; his association with the National Union of Students (Brazil) led to harassment from the military government of Brazil after 1964, prompting him to flee to Africa. Settling with his family in Ghana, he completed a Master of Arts degree at the University of Ghana, but fled once again to Senegal and then Nigeria following the Ghanaian coup of 1966; two years later, he took up an academic post at the University of Birmingham in the United Kingdom, where he remained until retiring in 2003.

Moraes Farias died at his home in Birmingham in 2026, aged 90.

== Honours ==
In July 2017, Moraes Farias was elected a Fellow of the British Academy (FBA), the United Kingdom's national academy for the humanities and social sciences.

Moraes Farias was the recipient of a ASAUK Distinguished Africanist award in 2017.

== Selected works ==
Moraes Farias published many scholarly articles, books and book chapters, including

- (Edited with K. Barber), Discourse and Its Disguises – The Interpretation of African Oral Texts (Centre of West African Studies, Birmingham University African Studies Series 1, 1989).
- (Edited with K. Barber), Self-Assertion and Brokerage – Early Cultural Nationalism in West Africa (Centre of West African Studies, Birmingham University African Studies Series 2, 1990).
- Arabic Medieval Inscriptions from the Republic of Mali: Epigraphy, Chronicles, and Songhay-Tuareg History, Fontes Historiae Africanae 4, new series (Oxford: Oxford University Press for The British Academy, 2003).
- (Edited with M. Diawara and G. Spittler) Heinrich Barth et l’Afrique (Cologne: Rüdiger Köppe Verlag, 2007).
