= John E. Flint =

Canadian historian

John Edgar Flint
- Born: May 17, 1930; Montreal, Canada
- Died: August 29, 2021 (aged 91)
- Occupation: Historian

John E. Flint (17 May 1930 – 29 August 2021) was a historian of Dalhousie University who was known for his work on the history of colonialism in Africa.

== Early life ==
John Edgar Flint was born in Montreal, Canada to Alfred Edgar Flint and Sarah Flint (née Pickup). He received his advanced education in England, graduating from Cambridge University (MA) and London University (PhD).

== Career ==
Flint was a member of the faculty of Dalhousie University for 27 years. He wrote biographies of George Taubman Goldie, which was a reworking of his PhD thesis, and Cecil Rhodes, and he edited volume five of The Cambridge History of Africa, dealing with the period c.1790 to c.1870.

In 2001, a Festschrift was published in Flint's honour under the title Agency and action in colonial Africa: Essays for John E. Flint.

== Family ==
Flint had a son Richard who was a disability rights campaigner and a daughter Helen who was a novelist and poet. Both died young due to the inherited degenerative condition cerebellar ataxia.

== Selected publications ==
- Sir George Goldie and the making of Nigeria. Oxford University Press, Oxford, 1960.
- Nigeria and Ghana. Prentice-Hall, Englewood Cliffs, NJ, 1966.
- Books on the British Empire and Commonwealth: A guide for students. Oxford University Press, London, 1968.
- Perspectives of empire: Essays in British imperial history presented to Gerald Sandford Graham. Prentice Hall Press, 1973. (Editor with Glyndwr Williams) ISBN 978-0582502642
- Cecil Rhodes. Little Brown, 1974. ISBN 978-0316286305
- The Cambridge history of Africa Volume 5: From c.1790 to c.1870. Cambridge University Press, Cambridge, 1977. (Editor) ISBN 9780521207010
