= African Literature Today =

Academic journal

- Subject: African literature
- Language: English

Publication details
- History: 1968–present

Standard abbreviations
- ISO 4: Afr. Lit. Today

Indexing
- ISSN: 0065-4000

Links
- Journal homepage

African Literature Today (ALT) is a journal that was first published in 1968 and is now the oldest international journal of African Literature still publishing.

The journal was founded by Eldred Durosimi Jones, and annual volumes were edited by Eldred Jones, Marjorie Jones, and Eustace Palmer, until ALT 23. As Nigerian academic Ode Ogede has written: "The pivotal role that this journal has played in the development of African literature and its criticism is underscored by the fact that many of those who have now established themselves as the foremost authorities in the field first cut their publishing teeth there."

ALT has been edited since 2003 by Ernest N. Emenyonu.
