= Jane I. Guyer =

British anthropologist

Jane I. Guyer (born 31 December 1943 - 17 January 2024) was the George Armstrong Kelly Professor in the Department of Anthropology at Johns Hopkins University.

Before coming to Hopkins, Guyer taught at Northwestern University, Harvard University, and Boston University. She published extensively on economic development in West Africa, on the productive economy, the division of labor, and the management of money. She was elected to the National Academy of Sciences in 2008 and served on several international and national committees, including the International Advisory Group to the World Bank and the governments of Chad and Cameroon on the Chad–Cameroon Petroleum Development and Pipeline Project, the Lost Crops of Africa panel published by the National Academy, and the Board and Executive Committee of the African Studies Association. Her research is celebrated for her contributions not just to empirical research but theoretical discourse on several topics.

== Education ==
Guyer was born in Scotland and attended the London School of Economics, earning a bachelor's degree in sociology in 1965. She then attended the University of Rochester, where the department focused on the British social anthropological tradition, and studied under Robert Merrill and Alfred Harris. She completed her graduate training in 1972. Her dissertation was titled The Organizational Plan of Traditional Farming: Idere, Western Nigeria. Guyer earned her first teaching position at the University of North Carolina before she had completed her studies.

== Major works ==
=== Publications ===
- Family and Farm in Southern Cameroon, 1984. Boston University, African Studies Center. Research Study #15.
- Feeding African Cities: Essays in Regional Social History (editor), 1987. Edinburgh University Press and the International African Institute.
- An African Niche Economy, 1997. Edinburgh University Press and the International African Institute.
- Time and African Land Use: Ethnography and Remote Sensing. 2007. Guyer and Eric Lambin (eds.) Special issue of Human Ecology, vol. 35, no. 1.
- Money Matters: Instability, Values and Social Payments in the Modern History of West African Communities (editor), 1995. Heinemann.
- Money Struggles and City Life (co-editor with LaRay Denzer and Adigun Agbaje), 2002. Heinemann.
- Marginal Gains: Monetary Transactions in Atlantic Africa, 2004. University of Chicago Press.
- Cultures of Monetarism. Collected papers and abstracts

=== Exhibits ===
- To Dance the Spirit: Masks of Liberia, 1986. Peabody Museum of Archaeology and Ethnology, Harvard University.
- Living Tradition in Africa and the Americas: The Legacy of Melville J. & Frances S. Herskovits, 1998. Mary and Leigh Block Museum of Art, Northwestern University.
