= London Universities Mooting Shield =

Crest of the London Universities Mooting Shield

The London Universities Mooting Shield, mostly known as LUMS, is an annual mooting league competition featuring teams of undergraduate students from University Law Faculties across London. The competition is run 'by students, for students' , and a strong emphasis is placed on personal development and networking, making LUMS noticeably different from other mooting competitions. As a domestic mooting competition, LUMS is concerned only with the Law of England and Wales, with moot problems being derived from the core topics studied by students on every LLB programme in that jurisdiction.

The competition is sponsored by law firm Allen & Overy, barristers' chambers 3 Verulam Buildings, 5 Stone Buildings, and Field Court Chambers. The LUMS Grand Final, between the two teams that come top of the competition league, is held in March each year at Allen & Overy's London office, with a senior representative from each of the sponsors sitting on the judging panel.

== History ==
LUMS was founded in 2007 by the student Masters of Moots from the four original participating universities; John Harrison (UCL), Daniel Jackson (SOAS), Richard Padley (LSE) and Krishan Thakker (King's College London),. The LUMS Executive Committee, which runs the day-to-day operations of the competition such as arranging rounds and judges, is always composed of past competitors. This ensures the student focus and the link to participating institutions.

Eight London Universities currently take part in the competition namely; University College London, King's College London, London School of Economics, University of Westminster, Queen Mary, Birkbeck College, City University London and University of Hertfordshire, which is located just outside London. In the past LUMS always gave the previous year's teams preference over the eight league slots, however from 2013 onwards due to growing interest in the competition up to two teams may be rotated out of the league to enable other universities to take part. London South Bank University, the School of Oriental and African Studies, University of London and University of Greenwich have taken part in previous years.

== Competition Format and Prizes ==
LUMS is based on a league format, which ensures that each team competes against every other at least once. The fact that no teams are knocked out until the Grand Final differentiates it from other mooting competitions, and is intended to maximise the educational benefit of the competition - both in terms of advocacy and career development. Rounds are hosted by the participating universities, certain of the competition sponsors and legal venues such as the Royal Courts of Justice and Crown Courts around London. The multiple moots which make up each round are always held on the same evening in the same place, enabling the competitors to get to know each other throughout the year and furthermore to find out more about the legal profession by meeting the barristers and solicitors who judged them in an informal context. At the end of the league rounds, the top two teams based on points go on to the Grand Final, meaning that the team coming top of the league does not always win the overall competition.

Each team consists of up to four undergraduate participants, of whom two act as counsel at each round. Team members therefore alternate between each round in order to evenly distribute their workload and promote teamwork. Team members are undergraduate students in order to prevent the competition being dominated by more experienced BPTC, LPC or GDL students, who might already have a training contract or pupillage, as is the case with some other mooting competitions.

The Grand Final requires all four members of each team to address a complex moot problem based on topical events. The winning team receives the Shield, which lends its name to the competition, with additional prizes offered to the individual winners varying each year. These have previously included mini-pupillages at some of the prestigious sponsoring chambers, making participation in the competition highly attractive to law students who are intending to become barristers. Prizes are also presented to the participant who has shown the best standard of advocacy throughout the competition's league rounds, and to the team which has embraced the spirit of the competition. A further prize, selected by the Master/Mistress of the Shield committee member, is awarded to a participant who has shown outstanding effort and teamwork.

== Past winners ==
Year	Winning University	Winning team Members	Runner-up University	Best Advocate Award	Spirit of the Shield Award	Master/Mistress of the Shield's Award
2013-14	University College London	John Williams, Scarlett Milligan, Cara Goldthorpe, Ruth Tan	Queen Mary	Julian Ranetunge	University of Hertfordshire	Lisa Blanco
2012-13	University College London	Lukas Maly, Anthea Brookes, Imaan Gangi, Meera Rajah	Queen Mary	Holly Thomas	Birkbeck College	Jim Hirschmann
2011-12	Queen Mary	Gianni Sonvico, Philip Mutton, William Paris, Rachel Hawkins	University College London	Patrick Georgiou	University of Westminster	Charlotte Workman
2010-11	London School of Economics	Ahmed Alani, Ingram Cheung, Lee Shi Min, Ting Yik Boh	Queen Mary	Emma Catia Walker	University of Hertfordshire	Laura Thompson
2009-10	University College London	Simon Tysoe, Elizabeth Day, Aathmika Kularatnam, Jason Shardlow-Wrest	Birkbeck College	Aathmika Kularatnam	University of Westminster	Lucy McKinley
2008-9	University College London	James Chandler, Daniel Law, Chiraag Patel, Lisa Quelch	London School of Economics	Azan Marwah	University of Greenwich	Conor McCabe
2007-8	University College London	Matthew Abraham, Ronnie Dennis, Marco de Sousa	King's College London	David Prowse		
