= Antonia Simbine =

Nigerian professor of political science

Antonia Taiye Simbine
- Born: Kaduna State, Nigeria
- Known for: First female Director‑General of NISER

Academic background
- Education: Ahmadu Bello University; University of Ibadan

Academic work
- Institutions: Nigerian Institute Of Social And Economic Research

Antonia Simbine is a Nigerian professor of Political science and the first female Director-General of the Nigerian Institute of Social and Economic Research (NISER).

== Early life and background ==
Antonia was born a twin in Kaduna State, Nigeria, where she spent most of her early life. She is from Ayere in Ijumu Local Government Area of Kogi State.

== Education ==
Simbine obtained her first degree in Public Administration from Ahmadu Bello University (ABU), Zaria, in 1984. She later earned her MSc and PhD degrees in Political Science from the University of Ibadan (UI). As part of her PhD programme, she was awarded a British Council Fellowship in 1993, which enabled her to conduct research at the University of Leeds in the United Kingdom.

== Career ==
In 1984, Antonia began her professional career at the Nigerian Institute of Social and Economic Research (NISER) as a Youth Corps member. She rose to become a Research Professor and Director of the Social and Governance Policy Research Department by 2010. Her research work has focused on public sector governance, elections, gender issues including women’s education and political participation, international relations, and socio‑economic development.

From 2015 to 2020, she served as a National Commissioner at the Independent National Electoral Commission (INEC), representing the North‑Central geopolitical zone.

In May 2022, President Muhammadu Buhari appointed Simbine as Director‑General of the Nigerian Institute Of Social And Economic Research (NISER), the country’s premier socio‑economic policy research institute. She took office on 1 June 2022, becoming the first woman to lead NISER.
