= Vinigi Grottanelli =

Italian ethnologist (1912–1993)

Vinigi Lorenzo Grottanelli (13 August 1912, Avigliana - 30 May 1993) was an Italian ethnologist who worked at the Pigorini National Museum of Prehistory and Ethnography following the Second World War.

== Family background ==
Vinigi Grottanelli came from an aristocratic background. His father, Franco Winigisio, (1873-1973) was descended from the Ugurgièri della Berardenga, a Siennese family.

== Post war career ==
In 1946 Grottanelli joined the Executive Council of the International African Institute.He remained a participant until 1968. In 1969 he was appointed as the first Professor of Ethnology at the Sapienza University of Rome].

Grottanelli established the Italian Ethnological Mission to Ghana (IEMG) in 1954 which he then led until 1975.

== Selected publications ==
In 1978 a list of Grottanelli's works was published by the Frobenius-Institut in Paideuma: Mitteilungen zur Kulturkunde. This covered academic articles from 1936, but excluded newspaper articles.
