= Nici Nelson =

Africanist, social anthropologist

- Education: University of London
- Occupations: Africanist and social anthropologist

Nici Nelson is an Africanist, social anthropologist and an Honorary Research Fellow in the Department of Anthropology at Goldsmiths, University of London.

She obtained a PhD on Kikuyu women in Nairobi, Kenya, from the University of London in 1978 and has published on various fields including urban anthropology, gender and sexuality, and marriage and households in East Africa. Nelson was President of the African Studies Association of the United Kingdom (ASAUK) in the years 2002–2004 and was one of the recipients of the ASAUK Outstanding African Studies Award in 2015–2016.

== Publications ==
Nici Nelson published many scholarly articles and books, including:

- Dependence and Independence: Female Household Heads in Mathare Valley, A Squatter Community in Nairobi, Kenya. Dissertation School of Oriental and African Studies, University of London, 1978.
- Why has development neglected rural women?: a review of the South Asian literature, Oxford; New York: Pergamon Press, 1979.
- African women in the development process, Nici Nelson, ed., London, England; Totowa, N.J. : F. Cass, 1981.
- "A Discourse of Anger in a Situation of Gender-Power Asymmetry: The Negotiation of Safer Sexual Practices Between Young Women and Men in Nairobi". In: Stephanie Newell, ed., Images of African Women: The Gender Problematic. University of Stirling: Center for Commonwealth Studies, 1995. ISBN 978-1857690323.
- with Susan Wright, Power and participatory development : theory and practice, London : ITDG Pub., 1995. ISBN 978-1853392412.
- "Representations of Men and Women, City and Town in Kenyan Novels of the 1970s and 1980s". African Languages and Cultures, 9(2), pp. 145–165, 1996. ISSN 0954-416X.
- with Sue Jones, Urban poverty in Africa : from understanding to alleviation, London : Intermediate Technology Publications, 1999.
- "Genderizing Nairobi's Urban Space". In: F. Grignon and H. Maupeu, eds, L'Afrique Orientale, Annuaire 2000. Paris: L'Harmattan, pp. 269–323, 2000.
- with Sue Jones, Practitioners and poverty alleviation: influencing urban policy from the ground up, London: ITDG, 2005.
