= Richard Hodder-Williams =

Political scientist

- Born: 18 March 1943 (age 83); Borough of Fylde, Lancashire, England
- Education: Rugby School; Christ Church, Oxford
- Occupation: Political scientist
- Writing career
- Notable awards: Distinguished Africanist Award from ASAUK, 2016

Richard Hodder-Williams (born 18 March 1943, Borough of Fylde, Lancashire, England) is a British Africanist, Americanist and political scientist. He studied at Rugby School (1959–1961) and Christ Church, Oxford and is an emeritus professor of politics at the University of Bristol, where he also served as a Pro-(Vice-)Chancellor. He was director of Badminton School, Bristol (1993–2008), Sherborne School, Sherborne, Dorset, England (2000–2016) and Fairfield P.N.E.U. School, Bristol (1991–1999), and president to the African Studies Association of the United Kingdom (ASAUK) from 1996 to 1998. In 2008–2009, he was a High Sheriff of the City of Bristol. In 2016, ASAUK awarded him the Distinguished Africanist Award for his contributions to African Studies in the UK.

== Selected publications ==
His publications include:

- Public opinion polls and British politics, London, Routledge & K. Paul, 1970
- The politics of the US Supreme Court, London; Boston: G. Allen & Unwin, 1980
- White farmers in Rhodesia, 1890–1965: a history of the Marandellas, London: Macmillan, 1983
- Conflict in Zimbabwe: the Matabeleland problem, London, England: Institute for the Study of Conflict, 1983. Conflict studies no. 151
- Politics in Britain and the United States: Comparative Perspectives, Richard Hodder-Williams and James W. Ceaser (eds.), Durham, NC: Duke University Press, 1986
- A Directory of Africanists in Britain, Bristol, Avon. Published on behalf of the Royal African Society by the University of Bristol, 1986
- Churchill to Major: The British Prime Ministership since 1945 by L. Borthwick, Martin Burch, and Philip Giddings. Donald Shell and Richard Hodder-Williams (eds.), Routledge, 1995
- Judges and politics in the contemporary age, London: Bowerdean, 1996
- Land-Locked States of Africa and Asia, Richard Hodder-Williams, Keith McLachlan, and Sarah J. Lloyd (eds.), 1997
- An Introduction to the Politics of Tropical Africa, Routledge Library Editions: Development, 2010
