= Africa (journal) =

- Discipline: African studies
- Language: English
- Edited by: Karin Barber, David Pratten

Publication details
- History: 1928–present
- Publisher: Cambridge University Press on behalf of the International African Institute
- Frequency: 5/year
- Open access: Hybrid
- Impact factor: 1.235 (2021)

Standard abbreviations
- ISO 4: Africa

Indexing
- ISSN: 0001-9720 (print); 1750-0184 (web)
- LCCN: 29010790
- JSTOR: 00019720
- OCLC no.: 43039811

Links
- Journal homepage; Online access; Online archive; Journal page at Project MUSE

Africa is a peer-reviewed academic journal published by Cambridge University Press on behalf of the International African Institute. The journal covers the study of African societies and culture. The journal was established in 1928 and the editors-in-chief are Julie Archambault (Concordia University) and Joost Fontein (University of Johannesburg).

Africa strives to shed light on African philosophers, writers, and cultural and societal shifts.

== Abstracting and indexing ==
The journal is abstracted and indexed in:

- Anthropological Literature
- ATLA Religion Database
- Current Contents/Social and Behavioral Sciences
- EBSCO databases
- FRANCIS
- GEOBASE
- Historical Abstracts
- International Bibliography of Periodical Literature
- Index Islamicus
- International Bibliography of the Social Sciences
- Linguistic Bibliography
- Modern Language Association Database
- ProQuest databases
- Scopus
- Social Sciences Citation Index

According to the Journal Citation Reports, the journal has a 2021 impact factor of 1.235.
