= Carli Coetzee =

Africanist

- Born: South Africa
- Education: University of Cape Town
- Occupation: Academic
- Employer: African Studies Centre of the University of Oxford
- Website: carlicoetzee.com

Carli Coetzee is a research associate and Africanist at the African Studies Centre of the University of Oxford focusing on African literature and African popular cultural studies.

Coetzee was born in South Africa. In 1988, she obtained a Master's degree in Afrikaans literature and in 1993 a PhD degree, both at the University of Cape Town. She held positions at the University of the Western Cape, the University of Cape Town, SOAS University of London and Queen Mary University of London and was a Fellow at Harvard and the University of the Witwatersrand. Coetzee is the editor of the Journal of African Cultural Studies, United Kingdom, and was president of the African Studies Association of the United Kingdom (ASAUK) from 2022 to 2024).

== Publications ==
Coetzee has published many scholarly articles and some books, including:

- 'N Ondersoek na die aard van poësie, met verwysing na kinderpoësie en die "eenvoudige" poësie van N.P. van Wyk Louw en D.J. Opperman, Master's Thesis Dissertation, University of Cape Town, 1988. In Afrikaans. (Translated title: An inquiry into the nature of poetry, with reference to children's poetry and the "simple" poetry of N.P. van Wyk Louw and D.J. Opperman.)
- Writing the South African landscape, PhD Thesis, Dissertation, University of Cape Town, 1993.
- with Sarah Nuttall: Negotiating the past: the making of memory in South Africa, Oxford University Press, Cape Town, 1998.
- Accented futures: language activism and the ending of apartheid, Wits University Press, Johannesburg, 2013.
- (as Editor): Afropolitanism: reboot, London: Routledge, 2017.
- with Moradewun Adejunmobi (eds): Routledge handbook of African literature, Abingdon, Oxon: Routledge, 2019.
- Written under the Skin. Blood and Intergenerational Memory in South Africa, Melton: Boydell & Brewer, 2019, which won the 2021 Book of the Year Award for Scholarship from the African Literature Association.
