= Gervase Mathew =

Rev. Fr. Gervase Mathew O.P., M.A., S.T.L., F.S.A.
- Church: Roman Catholic Church
- Other posts: University Lecturer in Byzantine Studies, University of Oxford

Orders
- Ordination: 1934

Personal details
- Born: 14 March 1905
- Died: 4 April 1976 (aged 71)
- Education: Balliol College, Oxford

Anthony Gervase Mathew (14 March 1905 – 4 April 1976) was a Catholic priest and British academic. A member of the Dominican Order, he taught at Blackfriars, Oxford. His elder brother, David Mathew, served as a bishop in the Roman Catholic Church.

== Early life ==
Gervase Mathew was born on 14 March 1905. His father, Anthony Mathew, was a barrister, who elected to educate his two sons at home rather than send them away to boarding school.

In 1924 Gervase followed his brother, David, to Balliol College, Oxford, where he read Modern History under Sir Maurice Powicke. Following his graduation from Oxford, in 1928 Mathew studied at the British School at Athens. In the same year he joined the Dominican Order. He was ordained in 1934.

== Academic career ==
In 1934 Mathew returned to Oxford to take a post at Blackfriars. He delivered lectures at both the School of Theology and Blackfriars.

Matthew's publications covered a range of fields, including classical antiquity, Byzantine art and history, historical theology, patristics, and fourteenth-century English literature and politics. In collaboration with the Chair of Modern Greek studies, Professor John Mavrogordato, Mathew instituted Byzantine Studies at the University of Oxford. From 1947–1971 he held the post of University Lecturer in Byzantine Studies, and in 1965 he was Visiting Professor at the University of California.

While at Oxford, Mathew was a guest member of a literary group, the Inklings, which was also frequented by J. R. R. Tolkien, C. S. Lewis, David Cecil, and Owen Barfield.

== Selected bibliography ==
- The Prayer of Quiet (Oxford: Blackfriars Publications, 1936)
- Justice and Charity in The Vision of Piers Plowman (Oxford: Blackfriars Publications, 1948)
- Byzantine Painting (London: Faber and Faber, 1950)
- The Origins of Eucharistic Symbolism (Oxford: Blackfriars Publications, 1954)
- Byzantine Aesthetics (London: John Murray, 1963)
- History of East Africa. Volume I (Oxford: Clarendon Press, 1963) co-editor with Roland Oliver
