= Sylvester Umaru Onu =

Nigerian judge (1938–2020)

Sylvester Umaru Onu (15 June 1938 – 20 November 2020) was a Nigerian judge. He was an Associate Justice on the Supreme Court of Nigeria from June 1993 to 2014.

Onu was from Egume, in what is now Kogi State. He attended Government College, Keffi, Ahmadu Bello University, Gibson and Weldon, and the Law School at the School of Oriental and African Studies, part of the federal University of London. He held several law-related positions before his appointment to the Court of Appeal in 1984, which he left for the Supreme Court in 1993. Onu died on 20 November 2020, at the age of 82.
