= Associazione per gli Studi Africani in Italia =

African Studies Association in Italy

The African Studies Association Italy (Italian: Associazione per gli Studi Africani in Italia, ASAI) is an Italian learned society of about 100 Africanists and is based both at the University of Urbino and Roma Tre University. ASAI was founded in 2010 and is an associated member of the AEGIS network of African studies centres in Europe.

== Conferences ==
ASAI organises a biennial national conference on African studies:

- 2010, ASAI I: Studi italiani sull’Africa a 50 anni dall’indipendenza (Italian African studies 50 years since independence), University of Naples "L'Orientale", 30 September-2 October 2010
- 2012, ASAI II: Convegno di Studi Africani (African studies meeting), University of Pavia, 18-20 September 2012
- 2014, ASAI III: Africa in movimento (Africa in motion), University of Macerata, 17-20 September 2014
- 2016, ASAI IV: Africa in fermento. Conflitti, modernità, religioni (Africa in ferment. Conflicts, modernity, religions), University of Catania, 22-24 September 2016
- 2018, ASAI V: Plural Africa: politiche, saperi e dinamiche sociali (Plural Africa, politics, knowledge and social dynamics), University of Bologna, 5-7 September 2018
- 2020, ASAI VI: AFRICA. IN, OUT, ABOUT. Prospettive storiche, politiche e culturali dal continente e dalle diaspore (Historical, political and social prospects of the continent and the diaspora), University of Milan, 16-18 September 2020 (cancelled because of the COVID-19 pandemic)
- 2022, ASAI VI: Afriche del terzo millennio nel mondo globale: sfide, riconfigurazioni e opportunità. Third millennium Africas in the global world. Challenges, reconfigurations, and opportunities, University of Urbino, 29 June-1 July 2022
