= Nigerian Institute Of Social And Economic Research =

Research institute in Nigeria

Nigerian Institute Of Social And Economic Research is a public research institute located in Ibadan. The center is one of the foremost publicly funded think tanks in the country. It is headed by a director-general, Antonia Simbine.

== Background ==
Prior to NISER, colonial authorities established the West African Institute of Social and Economic Research. The center was founded in 1950 and headquartered in Ibadan with a mission to provide information on economic and social ideas that will be pivotal to development of British West African countries. The institute was affiliated with University of Ibadan and was publicly funded. In 1957, Ghana obtained political independence and opted out of the institute. After Nigeria gained independence in 1960, the name of the institute was changed to Nigerian Institute of Social and Economic Research.

In 1977, the military government made NISER an autonomous body. Thereafter, NISER's responsibilities include coordinating social and economic research in federal universities. The institute also carries out independent research on social and economic issues, provide consultative service to the government based on research findings. The institute's facilities are used as a venue for seminars and conferences.

== Activities ==
NISER's products and activities include publications of conference proceedings and research findings, organizing training workshops, and seminars. In 2006, a failing National Manpower Board was merged with NISER.

In 2010, NISER began collaborating with Brookings Institution in the latter's African Growth Initiative program.

== Structure ==
NISER is divided into three departments: Economic Policy Research Department, Social and Governance Policy Research Department, and Surveillance and Forecasting Department. Two other departments focus on administrative and networking functions.

The institute is headed by a director-general, it has six zonal offices and liaison offices in Lagos and Abuja.
