= Anthony Kirk-Greene =

British historian and ethnographer ( 1925–2018)

Anthony Kirk-Greene CMG MBE
- Born: Anthony Hamilton Millard Kirk-Greene; May 16, 1925; Tunbridge Wells, Kent, United Kingdom
- Died: 8 July 2018 (aged 93); Oxford, Oxfordshire, United Kingdom
- Education: Cambridge University
- Occupations: Colonial administrator and academic historian.
- Writing career
- Subjects: History of Nigeria and British colonial administration

Anthony Hamilton Millard Kirk-Greene CMG MBE (16 May 1925 – 8 July 2018) was a British historian and ethnographer best known for his works on Nigerian history and the history of British colonial administration in Africa. After a career as a colonial official, Kirk-Greene became a fellow of St Antony's College, Oxford, where he was lecturer in the modern history of Africa from 1967 to 1992. He was president of the African Studies Association of the UK from 1988 to 1990 and vice-president of the Royal African Society.

== Biography ==
Anthony Kirk-Greene was born in Tunbridge Wells in Kent, England, on 16 May 1925. He served as a captain in the Indian Army from 1943 to 1947 during World War II. He later graduated from Cambridge University in 1950 and in 1954 with Bachelor and Masters of Arts degrees. He also obtained a Master of Arts from Oxford University in 1967.

Kirk-Greene joined the Colonial Service, serving as an administrator in Nigeria and eventually rising to the rank of Senior District Commissioner. During this time, he became interested in ethnography and Hausa culture and language. After Nigerian independence, he was a senior lecturer at Ahmadu Bello University at Zaria, Kaduna State from 1961 to 1965. From 1967 to 1981 he was professor of history at St Antony's College, Oxford. He was adjunct professor from 1992 to 1999 at the Stanford Program at Oxford. He wrote a number of well-received works on Nigerian history and the Nigerian Civil War as well as the political science of post-independence Africa more generally. He also wrote a number of important studies on the history of the Colonial Service.

He was president of the African Studies Association of the United Kingdom (ASAUK) from 1998 to 1990 and was awarded ASAUK's "Distinguished Africanist" award in 2005. He died in Oxford on 8 July 2018 at the age of 93.

== Selected works ==
- This is Northern Nigeria: Background to an Invitation (1956)
- The Capitals of Northern Nigeria (1957)
- Adamawa, Past and Present; An Historical Approach to the Development of a Northern Cameroons Province (1958) ISBN 0712903984
- Maiduguri and the Capitals of Bornu. Maiduguri da manyan biranen Barno (1958)
- Barth's Travels in Nigeria: Extracts from the Journal of Heinrich Barth's Travels in Nigeria, 1850-1855 (1962)
- The Principles of Native Administration in Nigeria; Selected Documents, 1900-1947 (1965)
- Hausa ba dabo ba ne; A Collection of 500 Proverbs (1966)
- A Modern Hausa Reader. With Yahaya Aliyu (1967)
- West African Travels and Adventures; Two Autobiographical Narratives from Northern Nigeria (1971) ISBN 0300014260
- Crisis and Conflict in Nigeria: A Documentary Sourcebook 1966-1970 (in 2 vols.) (1971) ISBN 0192156411
- The Genesis of the Nigerian Civil War and the Theory of Fear (1975) ISBN 9171060855
- A Biographical Dictionary of the British Colonial Governor (1980) ISBN 0817926119
- "Stay by your Radios": Documentation for a Study of Military Government in Tropical Africa (1981) ISBN 9070110296
- Nigeria since 1970: A Political and Economic Outline (1981) ISBN 0340262079
- A Biographical Dictionary of the British Colonial Service, 1939-1966 (1991) ISBN 0905450965
- On Crown Service: A History of HM Colonial and Overseas Civil Services, 1837-1997 (1999) ISBN 1860642608
- Britain's Imperial Administrators, 1858-1966 ISBN 0333732979 (2000) ISBN 0333732979
- Glimpses of Empire: A Corona Anthology (2001) ISBN 1860643981
- Symbol of Authority: The British District Officer in Africa (2006) ISBN 9781850434528
- Aspects of Empire: A Second Corona Anthology (2012) ISBN 9781848855144
