= Insa Nolte =

Insa Nolte (born 1969 in Göttingen, Germany) is an Africanist and Professor of African Studies in the Department of African Studies and Anthropology at the University of Birmingham. She obtained a first degree in Economics from the Free University of Berlin (FUBerlin) and graduated from the University of Birmingham with a PhD thesis on the history and politics of Ijebu-Remo (Southwest Nigeria, Ogun State), the regional base of the Nigerian Nationalist politician Obafemi Awolowo. After a Kirk-Greene Junior Research Fellowship at St Antony's College, Oxford, she became Lecturer in African Studies at Birmingham University in 2001. She has been Head of department since 2018. Her research focuses on Yoruba history, culture and politics. Nolte was a president of the African Studies Association of the United Kingdom from 2016 to 2018.

== Publications ==
Nolte published many scholarly articles, books and book chapters including

- Obafemi Awolowo and the making of Remo : the local politics of a Nigerian nationalist, Edinburgh : Edinburgh University Press. Series: International African library, 40, 2009.
- Colonial Politics and Precolonial History: Everyday Knowledge, Genre, and Truth in a Yoruba Town. History in Africa, 40 (2013) : 125–164.
- with Ogen, O. & Jones, R. (eds.), Beyond Religious Tolerance: Muslim, Christian & Traditionalist Encounters in an African Town. Series: Religion in Transforming Africa, New York: James Currey, an imprint of Boydell & Brewer, 2017.
- with Olukoya Ogen: Introduction, in Views from the Shoreline: Community, trade and religion in coastal Yorubaland and the Western Niger Delta, Yoruba Studies Review, 2(2017), 1–16, fulltext.
- Imitation and creativity in the establishment of Islam in Oyo, in T. Green & B. Rossi (eds.), Landscapes, Sources, and Intellectual Projects in African History. African History, vol. 6, Brill, pp. 91–115, 2018.
- Boko Haram explained, The Political Quarterly 90(2019), 2, 324–325. Book review.
- ‘At least I am married’: Muslim-Christian marriage and gender in southwest Nigeria, Social Anthropology/Anthropologie Sociale, 28(2020), no. 2, pp. 434–450.
