= International Environmental Law Research Centre =

The International Environmental Law Research Centre (or IELRC) is an independent, non-profit research organisation established in 1995. It is an Association under Articles 60ff of the Swiss Civil Code. It has offices in the International Environment House in Geneva, Switzerland, Nairobi, Kenya and New Delhi, India.

== Research areas ==
- Biosafety
- Biodiversity
- Climate change
- Intellectual property
- Justice and human rights
- Water

== Publications ==
Recent books written by IELRC researchers include:

- P. Cullet, Intellectual Property Protection and Sustainable Development (New Delhi: Lexis/Nexis - Butterworths, 2005)
- S. Muralidhar, Law, Poverty and Legal Aid - Access to Justice (New Delhi: Lexis/Nexis - Butterworths, 2004)
- P. Cullet, A. Gowlland-Gualtieri (eds), Key Materials in International Environmental Law (Aldershot: Ashgate Publishing, 2004)
- P. Cullet, Differential Treatment in International Environmental Law (Aldershot: Ashgate Publishing, 2003)
- P. Kameri-Mbote, Management in Kenya: The Case of Land Tenure and Wildlife (Nairobi: ACTS Press, 2002)

== Journal ==
IELRC co-publishes the Law, Environment and Development Journal (LEAD) with the Law School of the School of Oriental and African Studies.
