= John McCracken (historian) =

British historian (1938–2017)

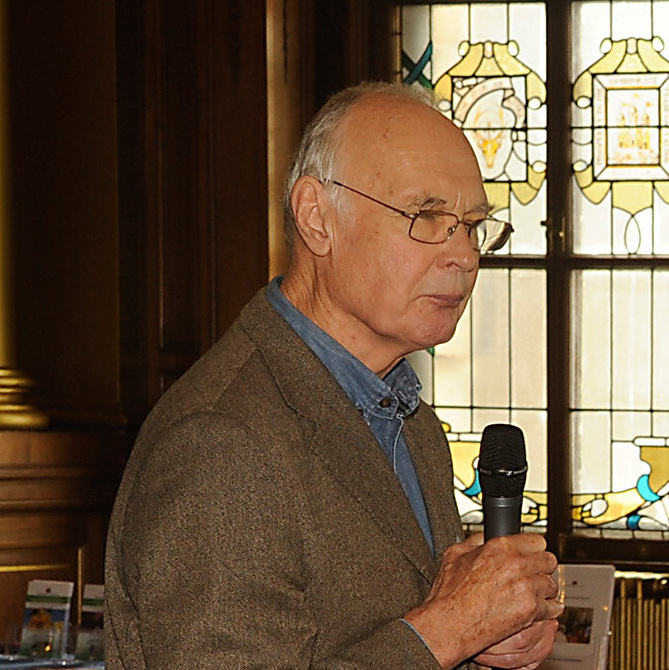
- photo by the Scotland Malawi Partnership
- Born: Kenneth John McCracken; 1 July 1938; Edinburgh, United Kingdom
- Died: 23 October 2017 (aged 79)
- Occupations: Historian and Africanist
- Spouse(s): Jane Purkis (m. 1966; died 1967) Juliet Clough (m. 1972)

Academic background
- Education: University of Cambridge
- Doctoral advisor: Ronald Robinson

Academic work
- Discipline: History
- Sub-discipline: History of Malawi; Christianity in Africa
- Institutions: University of Dar es Salaam; University of Stirling

Kenneth John McCracken (1 July 1938 – 23 October 2017) was a British historian and Africanist. He was known particularly for his works on the history of Malawi and Christianity in sub-Saharan Africa.

== Biography ==
John McCracken was born in Edinburgh, Scotland, on 1 July 1938. He was educated at Sedbergh School and later studied at St John's College, Cambridge, where he became interested in African history. He undertook a PhD at Cambridge under the supervision of Ronald Robinson, focussing on Church of Scotland missions in colonial Malawi.

While still a doctoral student, in 1964 McCracken left for Africa. He took up a teaching post at University College of Rhodesia and Nyasaland in Salisbury, Southern Rhodesia (now Harare, Zimbabwe) and was present at the celebrations of Malawian independence in July 1964. After Rhodesia's Unilateral Declaration of Independence in 1965, he left the country to teach at the new history department in the University of Dar es Salaam in Tanzania. There he completed his doctorate, which was subsequently published as Politics and Christianity in Malawi, 1875–1940 (1977). He acquired a reputation as one of the leading historians of Christianity in Africa. While in Tanzania, McCracken's wife Jane Purkis was killed in a car accident only ten months after their marriage.

McCracken returned to Britain in 1968 in order to take up a post at the University of Stirling, founded the previous year, where he remained for most of his academic career. He published a number of well-received articles and chapters on the social, economic, and political history of Malawi as well as environmental history. He remarried in 1972.

McCracken left Stirling briefly between 1980 and 1983 to take up a senior post at the University of Malawi. He also served as president of the African Studies Association of the United Kingdom (ASAUK) between 1990 and 1992. He retired from teaching in 2002. After his retirement, McCracken continued to work on Malawian history, publishing several further monographs including A History of Malawi, 1859–1966 (2012) and Voices from the Chilembwe Rising (2015). He died on 23 October 2017.

A posthumous festschrift, entitled Politics, Christianity and Society in Malawi, was published in his honour in 2020.

== Citations ==
=== References ===
- Vaughan, Megan (2018). "Kenneth John McCracken, 1938–2017". Journal of Southern African Studies. 44 (1): 197–199. doi:10.1080/03057070.2018.1414519.
