= Journal of African Law =

- Discipline: Law
- Language: English
- Edited by: Ebenezer Durojaye, Olivia Lwabukuna, Adewale Olawoyin

Publication details
- History: 1957-present
- Publisher: Cambridge University Press

Standard abbreviations
- ISO 4: J. Afr. Law

Indexing
- ISSN: 1464-3731 (print); 1464-3731 (web)
- LCCN: 00-238473
- JSTOR: 00218553
- OCLC no.: 41964463

Links
- Journal homepage

The Journal of African Law is a peer-reviewed law journal published three times a year by Cambridge University Press on behalf of SOAS University of London, UK.

The journal was first published in 1957, with a foreword by Tom Denning, Baron Denning. Earlier issues of the journal focused on legal pluralism and customary law, but later this focus has shifted to a focus on issues of international law within the African context.
