= The Journal of African History =

- Discipline: History of Africa
- Language: English
- Edited by: Abou Bamba, Michelle Moyd, Naaborko Sackeyfio-Lenoch, Samuel Severson, Thulasizwe Simpson

Publication details
- History: Since 1960
- Publisher: Cambridge University Press
- Frequency: Continuous, online only
- Open access: Yes
- License: Creative Commons
- Impact factor: 0.9 (2024)

Standard abbreviations
- ISO 4: J. Afr. Hist.

Indexing
- ISSN: 0021-8537 (print); 1469-5138 (web)
- LCCN: 63005723
- JSTOR: 00218537
- OCLC no.: 1039207112

Links
- Journal homepage; Online access; Online archive

The Journal of African History is a triannual peer-reviewed open access academic journal. It was established in 1960 and is published by Cambridge University Press. It covers African history and archaeology and was established by John Fage and Roland Oliver. The editors-in-chief are Michelle Moyd (Michigan State University), Moses Ochonu (Vanderbilt University), and Thulasizwe Simpson (University of Pretoria).

== Abstracting and indexing ==
The journal is abstracted and indexed in:

- Arts and Humanities Citation Index
- Current Contents/Arts & Humanities
- EBSCO databases
- GEOBASE
- International Bibliography of Periodical Literature
- Linguistic Bibliography
- Modern Language Association Database
- ProQuest databases
- Scopus
- Social Sciences Citation Index

According to the Journal Citation Reports, the journal has a 2024 impact factor of 0.9.

== Еditors ==
- 1990-1997 Joseph C. Miller
