= David Birmingham =

English historian

- Born: 1938 (age 87–88)

Academic background
- Education: University College of Ghana (BA); SOAS University of London (PhD)
- Thesis: The Mbundu and neighbouring peoples of central Angola under the influence of Portuguese trade and conquest, 1482–1790 (1964)
- Doctoral advisor: Roland Oliver

Academic work
- Discipline: History
- Sub-discipline: Modern history History of Central Africa; History of Angola
- Institutions: SOAS University of London (1965–1966); University of Ghana (1966–1979); University of Kent (1979–2002)

David B. Birmingham (born 1938) is an English historian and academic, specialising in modern Central African and Angolan history. He is emeritus Professor of History at the University of Kent.

== Biography ==
Birmingham was born in England and grew up in Switzerland from 1947 to 1954, attending a French school. After doing social work in Germany as a conscientious objector for his National Service, he moved to Accra in 1955 and enrolled at the University College of the Gold Coast (renamed University College of Ghana in 1957), where his father was a professor of political economy, and graduated with a BA in African history during the 1950s.

In 1960, Birmingham took a six-week course in Portuguese in Coimbra before beginning his research at the Arquivo Histórico Ultramarino. According to his own account, he acted as an interpreter at the London office of Amnesty International for Agostinho Neto, president of the People's Movement for the Liberation of Angola, following Neto's escape from prison in Portuguese Angola in 1962. He completed his PhD on The Mbundu and neighbouring peoples of central Angola under the influence of Portuguese trade and conquest, 1482–1790 under the supervision of Roland Oliver at SOAS University of London in 1964.

Birmingham lectured in West Africa from 1963 to 1965, at SOAS from 1965 to 1966, and in Latin American history at the University of Ghana from 1966 to 1979. In 1980, he was appointed to the chair of modern history at the University of Kent in Canterbury, from which he retired in 2002. He held visiting appointments in Cameroon, China, Democratic Republic of the Congo, Tanzania and California, as well as in Switzerland during the 1990s. He worked as a city guide in Canterbury following his retirement.

He first travelled to Angola in 1963, on a scholarship from the Institute of Race Relations, and revisited the country on numerous occasions, including in 1975, 1987, 2003, and 2006. Between 1971 and 1974, he corresponded with the South African journalist and anti-apartheid activist Colin Legum.

He joined the Reform Club in London before 1974. He is a member of the advisory board of the BP-sponsored British-Angola Forum at Chatham House, established in 1998.

== Work ==
Birmingham specialises in Angolan and Central African history from 1400 to 1990. His 2015 brief survey of modern Angolan history was written as a replacement for a longer volume that the anthropologist Jill Rosemary Dias had been preparing until her death in 2008. Birmingham's first full-length book of 1966 was criticised by Jan Vansina for ignoring the anthropological perspective on African history.

Birmingham's 1987 report on the informal economy in Angola served as a planning paper to members of the Angolan cabinet led at the time by José Eduardo dos Santos.

He is a contributor to the Accord series published by the Conciliation Resources.

== Publications ==
=== Authored ===
- The Portuguese Conquest of Angola, London: Oxford University Press, 1965 (an Institute of Race Relations publication)
- Trade and Conflict in Angola: The Mbundu and Their Neighbours Under the Influence of the Portuguese, 1483–1790, Oxford: Clarendon Press, 1966
- Central Africa to 1870: Zambezia, Zaïre, and the South Atlantic: Chapters from The Cambridge History of Africa, Cambridge: Cambridge University Press, 1981, ISBN 0521241162
- Kwame Nkrumah, London: Cardinal, 1990, ISBN 0747405042 (rev. edn. as Kwame Nkrumah: The Father of African Nationalism, Athens, OH: Ohio University Press, 1998, ISBN 0821412426)
- Frontline Nationalism in Angola & Mozambique, Trenton, NJ: Africa World Press, 1992, ISBN 0865433674
- A Concise History of Portugal, Cambridge: Cambridge University Press, 1993, ISBN 0521438802 (2nd edn. 2003, 3rd edn. 2018)
- The Decolonization of Africa, London: UCL Press, 1995, ISBN 1857285409
- Portugal and Africa, Basingstoke: Macmillan, 1999, ISBN 0333734041
- Trade and Empire in the Atlantic, 1400–1600, London: Routledge, 2000, ISBN 0415234603
- Switzerland: A Village History, Basingstoke: Macmillan, 2000, ISBN 0333800141
- "Angola", in Patrick Chabal et al., A History of Postcolonial Lusophone Africa, London: Hurst & Co., 2002, pp. 137–84, ISBN 1850655944
- Empire in Africa: Angola and Its Neighbors, Athens, OH: Ohio University Press, 2006, ISBN 0896802485
- A Short History of Modern Angola, London: Hurst & Co., 2015, ISBN 9781849045193
- Canterbury Before the Normans, Lancaster: Palatine Books, 2015, ISBN 9781910837016

=== Edited or translated ===
- (ed., with Richard Gray) Pre-colonial African Trade: Essays on Trade in Central and Eastern Africa Before 1900, London: Oxford University Press, 1970, ISBN 019215639X
- (ed., with Phyllis M. Martin) History of Central Africa, 3 vols., London: Longman, 1983–1998

== Honours and awards ==
- John and Peggy Hayes Canterbury Award (2017, for Canterbury before the Normans)
- Bourdarie Prize from the French Academy of Overseas Studies (2020, for the French translation of A Short History of Modern Angola)

== Personal life ==
Birmingham is married to Elizabeth, with whom he has children.

== Sources ==
- Birmingham, David (2015), A Short History of Modern Angola, London: Hurst & Co., ISBN 9781849045193
- Birmingham, David (2016). "A historiografia de David Birmingham". Estudos Ibero-Americanos (Interview). 42 (3). Interviewed by Gebara, Alexsander: 1018–1025. doi:10.15448/1980-864X.2016.3.25238.
