= Sylvia Chant =

British academic (1958–2019)

- Born: 24 December 1958; United Kingdom
- Died: 18 December 2019 (aged 60)
- Education: King's College, Cambridge; University College London
- Scientific career
- Fields: Human geography; Gender and development; Gender studies; Poverty; Human migration; Urban studies
- Workplaces: London School of Economics and Political Science

Sylvia Hamilton Chant (24 December 1958 – 18 December 2019) was a British academic who was professor of Development Geography at the London School of Economics and Political Science and was co-director of the MSc Urbanisation and Development Programme in the LSE's Department of Geography and Environment.

== Background ==
Chant was born in 1958 in Dundee. Her parents were June Dollis Mary (born McCartney) and Stuart Ralston Chant (1930–2013), virologist and plant pathologist. She left Scotland when she was a baby. She earned her BA at King's College, Cambridge and then her PhD at University College London in 1984 (Las Olvidadas: a study of women, housing and family structure in Queretaro, Mexico). Chant was a so that her father could research and lecture. She said that pride in her father's work with tropical agriculture, including the cassava mosaic virus influenced her career choice. She took Geography at the University of Liverpool from 1987 to 1988, before joining the LSE. She died after a battle with cancer in 2019.

== Contributions ==
She read the works of Betty Friedan, Angela Carter and Marilyn French and realised the bias that was present in academia. Her doctorate and first paper looked at how women were involved with self-help housing in Querétaro in Mexico.

Gender and development research were her interests and in particular the 'feminisation of poverty', livelihoods and employment in urban areas. Working in Costa Rica, Mexico, the Philippines and The Gambia. In the Gambia she has also worked on resistance to female genital mutilation.

She was the editor of The International Handbook of Gender and Poverty : Concepts, Research, Policy (2010),

== Awards ==
- Fellow, Royal Society of Arts (2011)
- Fellow of the Academy of Social Science (2016)
- Leverhulme major research fellowship (2003-2006)
- Adlbertska Guest Professor of Sustainable Development, University of Gothenburg (2013-2015)

== Publications ==
- Cities, Slums and Gender in the Global South: Towards a Feminised Urban Future (with Cathy McIlwaine) (Routledge, 2016)
- (ed.) The International Handbook of Gender and Poverty: Concepts, Research, Policy (Elgar, 2010).
- Geographies of Development in the 21st Century (with Cathy McIlwaine) (Elgar, 2009)
- Gender, Generation and Poverty: Exploring the 'Feminisation of Poverty' in Africa, Asia and Latin America (Elgar, 2007)
- Gender in Latin America (in association with Nikki Craske) (Latin America Bureau, 2003)
- Genero en Latinoamerica in Latin America (in association with Nikki Craske) (Publicaciones de la Casa Chata, 2007)
- Mainstreaming Men in Gender and Development (with Matthew Gutmann) (Oxfam, 2000)
- Three Generations, Two Genders, One World (with Cathy McIlwaine) (Zed, 1998)
- Women-headed Households: Diversity and Dynamics in the Developing World (Macmillan, 1997, reprinted 1999)
- Women of a Lesser Cost: Female Labour, Foreign Exchange and Philippine Development (with Cathy McIlwaine) (Pluto, 1995)
- (ed.) Gender and Migration in Developing Countries (Bellhaven, 1992)
- (ed.) Routledge Major Works on Gender, Poverty and Development (4 volumes) (with Gwendolyn Beetham (Routledge, 2015)
- Women and Survival in Mexican Cities (Manchester University Press, 1991)
- Women in the Third World: Gender Issues in Rural and Urban Areas (with Lynne Brydon) (Elgar, 1989, reprinted 1993)
- Community leadership and self-help housing (Peter Ward and Sylvia Chant) (Pergamon 1987)
- Gender, Urban Development and Housing (UNDP, 1996)
