= Alfred Zack-Williams =

Political scientist

- Born: September 1945 (age 80–81); Freetown, Sierra Leone
- Education: University of Liverpool; University of Salford; University of Sheffield
- Occupation: Political scientist

Alfred Babatunde 'Tunde' Zack-Williams (born September 1945, Freetown, Sierra Leone) is a British Emeritus Professor of Sociology and Research Degrees Tutor at the University of Central Lancashire (UCLAN). He is an Africanist and a political scientist.

He obtained a Bachelor of Arts degree at the University of Liverpool and a MSc at the University of Salford, both in sociology. His PhD thesis with the University of Sheffield was entitled Underdevelopment and Diamond Mining in Sierra Leone. Previously, Zack-Williams taught sociology at Bayero University Kano in 1979 and the University of Jos in Nigeria, and performed fieldwork research in Ghana, Nigeria, and Sierra Leone. He published extensively on Sierra Leone and West Africa.

Zack-Williams held a Fellowship of Trinity College Dublin and was a Feldman Engaged Scholar at Brandeis University, US. In 2013, he received the Amistad Award for distinguished service on human rights from the Central Connecticut State University and was honoured with the ASAUK Distinguished Africanist Award in 2020. He was secretary and president of the African Studies Association of the United Kingdom, Chair of the Fage and Oliver Book Prize and a long-time member of the British Academy Africa Panel. Zack-Williams chaired the Granby Mental Health Community Group, was a member of the editorial board of the journal Social Work Education, and is a co-editor of the journal Review of African Political Economy.

== Publications ==
Zack-Williams has published many journal articles, books and book chapters, including:

- Underdevelopment and economic planning in West Africa in special relation to the case of Sierra Leone. University of Salford. Salford : 1976.
- Diamond Mining and Underdevelopment in Sierra Leone-1930/1980. Africa Development / Afrique et Développement, Vol. 15, No. 2 (1990), pp. 95–117. Full-text PDF www.jstor.org. Retrieved 14 February 2022.
- Tributors, supporters, and merchant capital : mining and underdevelopment in Sierra Leone. Series The making of modern Africa. Aldershot : Avebury, 1995.
- Structural Adjustment: Theory, Practice and Impacts. Ed Brown, Bob Milward, Giles Mohan, Alfred B. Zack-Williams. Abingdon-on-Thames : Routledge, 2000.
- Africa in Crisis: New Challenges and Possibilities. Tunde Zack-Williams (Editor), Diane Frost (Editor), Alex Thomson (Editor). London : Pluto Press, 2002.
- The Politics of Transition: State, Democracy, and Economic Development in Africa, Giles Mohan and Tunde Zack-Williams; Review of African political economy. Series ROAPE African readers. Oxford; Trenton, N.J. : James Currey, African World Press, 2004.
- Africa from SAPs to PRSP : plus ça change plus c'est la même chose. Review of African political economy, no. 106. Basingstoke : Carfax, 2005.
- The Quest for Sustainable Development and Peace. A. B. Zack-Williams (Editor). Nordic Africa Institute Policy Dialogues no. 2. Uppsala : Nordiska Afrikainstutet, 2008. Full-text PDF www.diva-portal.org. Retrieved 14 February 2022.
- African Mosaic: Political, Social, Economic and Technological Development in the New Millennium, E. Ike Udogu (Author, Editor), A. B. Zack-Williams (Editor), 2009.
- When the State Fails: Studies on Intervention in the Sierra Leone Civil War. Tunde Zack-Williams, Ed. London : Pluto Press, 2012.
- When Children Become Killers: Child Soldiers in the Civil War in Sierra Leone. In C. Fernando & M. Ferrari (Eds.), Handbook of resilience in children of war (pp. 83–94). New York: Springer Science + Business Media, 2013.
- Africa Beyond the Post-Colonial: Political and Socio-Cultural Identities. Interdisciplinary Research Series in Ethnic, Gender and Class Relations. Alfred B. Zack-Williams (Author), Ola Uduku (Editor). Abingdon-on-Thames : Routledge, 2017.
