= Antony Nicholas Allott =

English academic (1924–2002)

Antony Nicholas Allott (30 June 1924 – 3 June 2002) was an English academic, Professor of African Law at the University of London.

He was educated at Downside School and New College, Oxford. He was appointed lecturer in African law at SOAS in 1948, and was Professor in African Law at the University of London from 1964 to 1986. He was director of Japanese company University Consultants, from 1990. He was a Roman Catholic.

== Works ==
- Essays in African law, with special reference to the law of Ghana, 1960
- Judicial and legal systems in Africa, 1962
- The limits of law, 1980
