= Matatu (journal) =

- Discipline: African literature, African studies
- Language: English
- Edited by: Tanaka Chidora, Pauline Mateveke Kazembe, Magdalena Pfalzgraf, Aderemi Raji-Oyelade, Frank Schulze-Engler, Alex Nelungo Wanjala

Publication details
- Former name: Matatu
- History: 1987–present
- Publisher: Brill Publishers
- Frequency: Biannually
- Open access: Hybrid

Standard abbreviations
- ISO 4: Matatu

Indexing
- ISSN: 0932-9714 (print); 1875-7421 (web)
- LCCN: 93642938
- OCLC no.: 51333248

Links
- Journal homepage

Matatu: Journal for African Literary and Cultural Studies is a biannual, double-anonymously peer-reviewed academic journal published by Brill Publishers. It focusses on African and Afrodiasporic literary and cultural studies, and is "open to interdisciplinary dialogue with fields such as the social sciences, cultural anthropology, and history". The journal's name derives from the East African public transport vehicle "Matatu".

The editors-in-chief are Tanaka Chidora (University of Malawi), Pauline Mateveke Kazembe (University of Zimbabwe), Magdalena Pfalzgraf (University of Bonn), Aderemi Raji-Oyelade (University of Ibadan), Frank Schulze–Engler (Goethe University Frankfurt), and Alex Nelungo Wanjala (University of Nairobi).

== History ==
Originally, the journal was self-published by founding editor Holger Ehling, starting in 1987 in Göttingen, Germany, and later published by Éditions Rodopi from 1990 onwards. It then was converted to a book series, with, amongst others, Gordon Collier, Geoffrey V. Davis†, Aderemi Raji-Oyelade, and Frank Schulze-Engler as series editors. In 2016, after Éditions Rodopi was acquired by Brill Publishers in 2014, the journal again became a periodical, initially subtitled Journal for African Culture and Society. Since then, the editorial team was expanded and subsequently the subtitle was changed to underline the journal's contributions to literary studies and since 2025 it is subtitled Journal for African Literary and Cultural Studies.

== Publications and Popular Contributions ==
Matatu is published biannually, having published nineteen articles in 2025 and eighteen articles in 2024. Amongst some of Matatu’s most popular contributions are articles such as “Theorizing African Feminism(s). The ‘Colonial’ Question”, “Queer Inclinations and Representations: Dambudzo Marechera and Zimbabwean Literature”, or “Refugee Life Narratives – The Disturbing Potential of a Genre and the Case of Mende Nazer”.

== Abstracting and indexing ==
The journal is abstracted and indexed in International Bibliography of Periodical Literature, Modern Language Association Database, Scopus, and the Web of Science Emerging Sources Citation Index (ESCI), amongst other indices.
