= Ode Ogede =

Nigerian-born American academic

Ode Ogede (often O. S. Ogede, Ode S. Ogede) is a Nigerian-born American academic who is professor of African literature and was a lecturer at Ahmadu Bello University.

== Publications ==
- Art, Society, and Performance: Igede Praise Poetry (University Press of Florida, 1997)
- Ayi Kwei Armah, Radical Iconoclast (Heinemann, 1999)
- Achebe and the Politics of Representation (Africa World Press, 2000)
- Teacher Commentary on Student Papers Conventions, Beliefs, and Practices. Westport, Conn: Bergin & Garvey, 2002
- Achebe's Things Fall Apart: Reader's Guide (Continuum, 2007)
- Helping Students Write Successful papers (Lang, 2013)
- Intertextuality in Contemporary African Literature: Looking Inward (Rowman & Littlefield, 2011)
- Chiji Akoma, Research in African Literatures 30 #4 (1999): 227–28
- Adekoo Adeleke, Research in African Literatures 42 # 2 (2011): 102–104
- Tanure Ojaide, World Literature Today 73.1 (1999): 199
- "Oral Tradition and Modern Storytelling: Revisiting Chinua Achebe's Short Stories". International Fiction Review. 28 (1): 67–77. 1 January 2001. ISSN 0315-4149.
- Contemporary Authors (Gale/Cengage Press 2007)
- Nigeria's Third-Generation Literature: Content and Form (Taylor & Francis, 2023). ISBN 9781000852141
