= John Lonsdale (historian) =

British historian and academic

- Born: John M. Lonsdale; 1937 (age 88–89)
- Education: Trinity College, Cambridge
- Occupations: Africanist and historian

John M. Lonsdale (born 1937) is a British Africanist and historian. He is Emeritus Professor of Modern African History at the Centre of African Studies in the Faculty of History at the University of Cambridge.

As a schoolboy, Lonsdale spent three summer holidays during 1953–56 in Kenya where his father, Rupert Lonsdale, had just taken a job. Having attended Sherborne School in Dorset, in 1956 he started his national service as a subaltern in the King's African Rifles. He then went on to study history at Trinity College, Cambridge, completing a BA degree in 1961 and a PhD in 1964. His first teaching job was at the University of Dar es Salaam in 1964.

Lonsdale studied the modern history of Kenya extensively and won the Outstanding African Studies Award of the African Studies Association of the United Kingdom in 2006. Although retired from teaching, he remains a life fellow (Title E) of Trinity College, Cambridge.

== Publications ==
Professor Lonsdale published many journal articles, books and book chapters including

- A political history of Nyanza, 1883–1945, PhD thesis University of Cambridge 1964
- "Some Origins of Nationalism in East Africa", The Journal of African History 9 (1968), 119–146, Cambridge University Press
- "Coping with the Contradictions: the Development of the Colonial State in Kenya, 1895–1914", by Bruce Berman and John Lonsdale, The Journal of African History 20 (1979), 487–505
- The growth and transformation of the colonial state in Kenya, 1929–52, University of Nairobi, Dept. of History, [1980], Series: Staff seminar paper (University of Nairobi. Department of History), 79/80, n. 17
- Explanation of the Mau Mau revolt, Johannesburg : University of the Witwatersrand, 1983
- Kikuyu political thought and the ideologies of Mau Mau, Los Angeles (California), African Studies Association, 1986
- "Mau Mau through the Looking Glass", Index on Censorship 15(1986), 19–22
- South Africa in question, John Lonsdale (ed.), Cambridge: African Studies Centre, University of Cambridge; London: Currey; Portsmouth, N.H.: Heinemann, 1988
- Unhappy Valley : Conflict in Kenya and Africa. Book One: State and class. Book Two: Violence & Ethnicity, by Bruce Berman and John Lonsdale, Eastern African Studies. Athens, Ohio: Ohio University Press. London: James Currey, Nairobi: Heinemann, 1992
- Politics in Kenya, by John Lonsdale and Wanyiri Kihoro, Edinburgh University, Centre of African Studies, 1992
- 'Listen while I read' : orality, literacy and Christianity in the young Kenyatta's making of the Kikuyu, Edinburgh, 1995
- Mau Mau and Nationhood : arms, authority & narration, by E. S. Atieno Odhiambo and John Lonsdale, Oxford : Currey; Nairobi : EAEP; Athens : Ohio University Press, 2003
- Writing for Kenya. the life and works of Henry Muoria, by Wangari Muoria-Sal, Bodil Folke Frederiksen, John Lonsdale, Derek Peterson (eds). Series: African Sources for African History, Volume: 10, Leiden & Boston: Brill, 2009
- Chapter 1. "On Writing Kenya's History", in A Tapestry of African Histories: With Longer Times and Wider Geopolitics, by Nicholas K. Githuku (ed.), Lexington Books, 2021
