= James Currey =

Former academic publisher

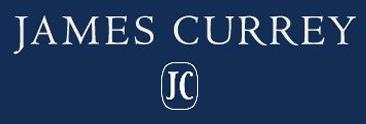
- Parent company: Boydell & Brewer
- Founded: 1984; 42 years ago
- Founder: James Currey
- Country of origin: United Kingdom
- Headquarters location: Melton, Woodbridge, Suffolk
- Publication types: Books
- Official website: jamescurrey.com

James Currey is an academic publisher specialising in African Studies that since 2008 has been an imprint of Boydell & Brewer. It is named after its founder, who established the company in 1984. It publishes on a full spectrum of topics—including anthropology, archaeology, history, politics, economics, development studies, gender studies, literature, theatre, film studies, and the humanities and social sciences generally—and its authors include leading names such as Bethwell Ogot and Ngũgĩ wa Thiong'o.

== History ==
Named after its founder, the company was established in 1984 when James Currey, originally from South Africa, left his position at Heinemann Educational Books to set up an Africa-focused publisher. At Heinemann, working with Chinua Achebe, Currey had spent more than a decade pioneering Heinemann's African Writers Series (AWS), the set of volumes that was a crucial factor in expanding the reach of African literature after World War II, particularly in English.

Currey cut his publishing teeth at the Cape Town outpost of Oxford University Press, as well as by spending time moonlighting for The New African, a liberal publication he followed into exile in London when it was stamped on by the Apartheid authorities in 1964.

We revived The New African in 1965 in London and, in all, published a total of over 50 issues. Thanks to the Congress for Cultural Freedom, we mailed each issue free to the original subscribers in South Africa. In the end, as Pretoria banned each issue, we had every month to invent a new name such as Inkululeko for the South African edition. Each "New African weekend," I would paste up work by writers with names such as James Ngugi, Bessie Head, Wole Soyinka, Zeke Mphahlele, Dennis Brutus and Chinua Achebe. It was this literary apprenticeship that enabled me to take over running the African Writers Series, with Keith Sambrook, at Heinemann in 1967.

In 1986, speaking at a Royal African Society symposium on the state of publishing in Africa, Currey described what he called "an academic book famine", down in part to the profit-driven reaction of the head offices of the big publishing houses, such as Heinemann and Longman, to negative economic developments on the continent during previous years. Currey spoke with pride of how small publishers like the James Currey imprint were the ones who picked up the slack as best they were able. To ensure high quality and global reach, while maintaining accessibility for African students, he said:

The aim should be to build up a sufficient international print run in three continents so that the book can be available at the correct price for the African market in paper covers and, if possible, in a paper covered edition in Britain and the US so that it can get on the reading lists of students in the rich countries as well. […] Second, publishers can share the printing costs, split the print runs, use local paper, and save foreign exchange. This means that the international print total can be substantial for an academic text.

As will be familiar to readers of its East African Studies series, for example, that James Currey has had just such a long-running three-continent effort shared between itself, Heinemann Kenya, and Ohio University Press. This co-publishing approach has continued since 2008, when James Currey became an imprint of Boydell & Brewer.

== Legacy ==
The James Currey Collection at the University of Oxford's St Cross College was formally opened on 2 March 2019 at an event featuring the launch of Tsehai Berhane-Selassie's new book on Ethiopian Warriorhood, a lecture by author and Fellow of St Cross, Richard Reid, and a discussion by panellists including key African women publishers Ellah Wakatama Allfrey, Bibi Bakare-Yusuf, Margaret Busby, Nana Ayebia Clarke and Zaahida Nabagereka.

The James Currey Prize for African Literature was established in 2020 by Nigerian writer, filmmaker, and publisher Onyeka Nwelue. It is awarded annually for the best unpublished work of fiction written in English, set in Africa, or about Africans in the African continent or diaspora. The winner of the inaugural prize was Ani Kayode Somtochukwu. James Currey Society, also established by Nwelue, administers the James Currey Prize for African Literature and the James Currey Fellowship in cooperation with African Studies Centre, at the University of Oxford.

The inaugural James Currey Literary Festival took place in September 2022 at the Weston Library in Oxford, under the auspices of the James Currey Society, with support from the British Council and other organizations. At the festival, the Pan African Writers Association (PAWA) bestowed the award of Grand Patron of the Arts on James Currey for his contribution to African Literature.

== See also ==
- L'Harmattan
