= Karin Barber =

British cultural anthropologist and academic

Dame Karin Barber DBE FBA
- Born: Karin Judith Barber; 2 July 1949 (age 77)
- Spouse: Paulo Fernando de Moraes Farias (partner)

Academic background
- Education: Lawnswood High School; Girton College, Cambridge; University College London; University of Ife

Academic work
- Discipline: Cultural anthropology
- Sub-discipline: Yoruba language; Yoruba culture; Oral literature; Literary anthropology
- Institutions: University of Ife; Centre of West African Studies, University of Birmingham; London School of Economics

Dame Karin Judith Barber, DBE, FBA (born 2 July 1949) is a British cultural anthropologist and academic, who specialises in the Yoruba-speaking area of Nigeria. From 1999 to 2017, she was Professor of African Cultural Anthropology at the University of Birmingham. Before joining the Centre of West African Studies of the University of Birmingham, she was a lecturer at the University of Ife in Nigeria. From 2018 to 2021, she was the Centennial Professor of Anthropology at the London School of Economics (LSE). In retirement, she is an emeritus professor at Birmingham and a visiting professor at LSE.

Barber has written two introductory textbooks for the Yoruba language, and a number of books concerning Yoruba culture, and oral literature and written literature in Africa. She has been awarded a number of prizes for her publications, and has been recognised by her peers and the British government for her contributions to scholarship.

== Early life and education ==
Barber was born on 2 July 1949 to Charles and Barbara Barber. She was educated at Lawnswood High School, an all-girls state grammar school in Lawnswood, Leeds. She studied English at Girton College, Cambridge, and graduated with a first class Bachelor of Arts (BA) degree; as per tradition, her BA was promoted to a Master of Arts (MA Cantab).

Barber then changed direction and studied social anthropology at University College London, completing a graduate diploma. She went on to undertake postgraduate research at the University of Ife in Nigeria, where she completed her Doctor of Philosophy (PhD) degree. Her research concerned the "role of oral poetic performance in everyday life" in Okuku, Osun State, Nigeria.

== Academic career ==
From 1977 to 1984, Barber was a lecturer in the Department of African Languages and Literature at the University of Ife in Nigeria. Yoruba, which she had learnt during her doctorate, was used as the medium of instruction. In 1985, she moved back to the United Kingdom and joined the Centre of West African Studies of the University of Birmingham. She was a lecturer from 1985 to 1993, a senior lecturer from 1993 to 1997, and then Reader from 1997 to 1999. From 1998 to 2001, she served as Director of the Centre of West African Studies. In 1999, she was appointed Professor of African Cultural Anthropology. She retired from Birmingham in 2017, and was appointed professor emeritus. In 2018, she was appointed Centennial Professor of Anthropology at the London School of Economics. She retired in 2021, and continued her associated with LSE as a visiting professor.

In addition to her full-time academic positions, Barber has held a number of visiting appointments. For the 1993/1994 academic year she was Preceptor of the Institute of Advanced Study and Research in the African Humanities at Northwestern University in Illinois, United States. In 1999, she was Melville Herskovits Distinguished Visiting professor at Northwestern University. In 2014, she was the Mellon Foundation Distinguished Visiting Scholar at the University of the Witwatersrand, South Africa.

Barber has held senior positions with the British Academy, the United Kingdom's national academy for the humanities and the social sciences. She was a member of the council from 2007 to 2008, and was its vice-president (Humanities) from 2008 to 2010.

=== Research ===
Barber is a cultural anthropologist, whose research has remained focused within the area in which she did her doctorate. She specialises in the "Yoruba-speaking area of Nigeria" (the Yoruba people), and their culture, religion, and oral and written literature. She has also looked comparatively at "popular culture across sub-Saharan Africa" and researched the "uses of literacy in colonial Africa".

As part of broader research interests, Barber teaches undergraduate and postgraduate courses on the popular culture of Africa, African religion and ritual, and also teaches the Yoruba language at beginner level.

== Personal life ==
Barber's partner was Paulo Fernando de Moraes Farias, a historian of medieval West Africa.

== Honours ==
In 2003, Barber was elected a Fellow of the British Academy (FBA), the United Kingdom's national academy for the humanities and social sciences. She was appointed Commander of the Order of the British Empire (CBE) in the 2012 New Year Honours for services to African studies and Dame Commander of the Order of the British Empire (DBE) in the 2021 New Year Honours for services to the study of African culture.

In 1991, Barber was awarded the "Amaury Talbot Prize for African Anthropology" by the Royal Anthropological Institute for I Could Speak Until Tomorrow: Oriki, Women and the Past in a Yoruba Town, her first book. In 2001, she was awarded the "Melville J. Herskovits Award" by the African Studies Association for The Generation of Plays: Yoruba Popular Life in Theatre. In 2009, she was awarded the "Susanne K. Langer Award for Outstanding Scholarship in the Ecology of Symbolic Form" by the Media Ecology Association for The Anthropology of Texts, Persons and Publics. In 2013, she was awarded the "Paul Hair Prize" by the African Studies Association for Print Culture and the First Yoruba Novel.

== Selected works ==
- Barber, Karin (1985). Yorùbá Dùn ún So: a beginners' course in Yorùbá (1st ed.). New Haven: Yale University Press. ISBN 978-0300029581.
- Barber, Karin; De Moraes Farias, P. F., eds. (1989). Discourse and its Disguises: the Interpretation of African Oral Texts. Birmingham: Birmingham University African Studies Series. ISBN 978-0704410428.
- Barber, Karin; De Moraes Farias, P. F., eds. (1990). Self-assertion and Brokerage: Early Cultural Nationalism in West Africa. Birmingham: Birmingham University African Studies Series. ISBN 978-0704410961.
- Barber, Karin (1991). I Could Speak until Tomorrow: Oriki, Women, and the Past in a Yoruba Town. Washington, D.C.: Smithsonian Institution Press. ISBN 978-1560980438.
- Barber, Karin; Collins, John; Ricard, Alain (1997). West African popular theatre. Bloomington, Indiana: Indiana University Press. ISBN 978-0852552452.
- Barber, Karin, ed. (1997). Readings in African popular culture. Bloomington, Indiana: Indiana University Press. ISBN 978-0253332943.
- Barber, Karin (2000). The Generation of Plays: Yoruba Popular Life in Theater. Bloomington, Indiana: Indiana University Press. ISBN 978-0253338075.
- Barber, Karin (2000). Yorùbá Dùn ún So: A Beginners' Course in Yorùbá (Part 2). Ibadan: New Horn Press. ISBN 978-2266329.
- Barber, Karin, ed. (2006). Africa's hidden histories: everyday literacy and making the self. Bloomington, Indiana: Indiana University Press. ISBN 978-0253347299.
- Barber, Karin (2007). The Anthropology of Texts, Persons and Publics: Oral and Written Culture in Africa and Beyond. Cambridge: Cambridge University Press. ISBN 978-0521837873.
- Barber, Karin, ed. (2012). Print culture and the first Yoruba novel: I.B. Thomas's 'Life story of me, Sẹgilọla' and other texts. Leiden: Brill. ISBN 978-9004229150.
