= List of African studies journals =

This is a list of articles about academic journals related to the field of African studies.

== A ==
- Abasebenzi
- Acta Germanica
- Africa
- Africa & Asia: Göteborg Working Papers on Asian and African Languages and Literatures
- Africa Bibliography
- Africa Confidential
- Africa Development
- Africa Education Review
- Africa Insight
- Africa Media Review
- Africa Renewal
- Africa Research Bulletin
- Africa Review of Books
- Africa, Rivista semestrale di studi e ricerche, successor of Africa: Rivista trimestrale di studi e documentazione
- Africa Spectrum
- Africa Today
- Africa Update
- Africa Week
- Africa Yearbook
- Africa-Asia Confidential
- African Affairs
- African and Asian Studies
- African and Black Diaspora
- African Anthropologist
- African Archaeological Review
- African Arts
- African Book Publishing Record
- African Communist
- African Crop Science Journal
- African Development Perspectives Yearbook
- African Development Review
- African Economic History
- African Economic History Review
- African Economic Outlook
- African Environment
- African Finance Journal
- African Health Sciences
- African Historical Review
- African Human Rights Law Journal
- African Human Rights Law Reports
- African Identities
- African Issues
- African Journal for the Psychological Study of Social Issues
- African Journal of AIDS Research
- African Journal of Aquatic Science
- African Journal of Ecology
- African Journal of International Affairs and Development
- African Journal of International and Comparative Law
- African Journal of Library, Archives and Information Science
- African Journal of Marine Science
- African Journal of Political Economy
- African Journal of Political Science
- African Journal on Conflict Resolution
- African Journals OnLine
- African Languages and Cultures
- African Markets Overview
- African Music (journal)
- African Natural History
- African Newsletter on Occupational Health and Safety
- African Population Studies
- African Renaissance
- African Safety Promotion
- African Security Review
- African Skies
- African Studies
- African Studies Abstracts Online
- African Studies Monograph
- African Studies Quarterly
- African Studies Review
- African Study Monographs
- African Symposium
- African Zoology
- Africana Libraries Newsletter
- Africanus
- Afrique & Histoire
- Afrique contemporaine
- Annales Aequatoria

== B ==
- Bulletin of the School of Oriental and African Studies

== C ==
- Cahiers d'Études africaines
- Callaloo
- Canadian Journal of African Studies
- Comparative and International Law Journal of Southern Africa
- Cuadernos de estudios africanos

== D ==
- Development Southern Africa
- Die Burger

== G ==
- GIGA Focus Afrika

== I ==
- International Journal of African Historical Studies

== J ==
- Journal of African Archaeology
- Journal of African Business
- Journal of African Cultural Studies
- Journal of African Earth Sciences
- Journal of African Economies
- Journal of African History
- Journal of African Law
- Journal of Contemporary African Studies
- Journal of Eastern African Studies
- Journal of Legal Pluralism and Unofficial Law
- Journal of Modern African Studies
- Journal of Religion in Africa
- Journal of Social Development in Africa
- Journal of Southern African Studies
- Journal of West African Languages
- Journal on African Philosophy

== K ==
- Koedoe
- Kroniek van Afrika

== L ==
- Leeds African Studies Bulletin

== P ==
- Pan-African Journal of Research and Innovation (PAJRI)
- Philosophia Africana
- Politique africaine
- Pula

== Q ==
- Quest

== R ==
- Review of African Political Economy
- Rhodesiana

== S ==
- SOAS Working Papers in Linguistics
- South African Geographical Journal
- South African Journal of Geology
- South African Historical Journal
- South African Journal of Science
- Sudan Tribune

== T ==
- The Africa Report
- Transition Magazine

== W ==
- Water SA
- World Development

== Z ==
- Zaïre. Revue Congolaise—Congoleesch Tijdschrift
- Zambezia

== See also ==
- African Journals OnLine
