= African Journal =

African Journal may refer to:

- African Journal of AIDS Research
- African Journal of Aquatic Science
- African Journal of Biomedical Research
- African Journal of Ecology
- African Journal of Economic Policy
- African Journal of Health Sciences
- African Journal of Infectious Diseases
- African Journal of International Affairs
- African Journal of Marine Science
- African Journal of Range & Forage Science
- African Journal of Reproductive Health
- African Journal of Urology
