= Frances Gamble =

South African climatologist and speleologist

- Born: Frances Margaret Niven; 1949
- Died: 1997 (aged 47–48); Johannesburg, South Africa
- Other names: F. M. Gamble, F. M. Niven, Frances Margaret Gamble
- Occupation(s): Climatologist, speleologist
- Years active: 1972–1995

Frances Gamble (1949–1997) was a South African climatologist and speleologist. Her work on cave conservation was extensive and pioneering. She evaluated cave ecosystems and conservation policies which were necessary to protect them. Gamble was one of the founders of the Cave Research Organisation of South Africa, which aimed at improving the scientific and professional development of speleology in South Africa. She was president of the Environmental Education Association of South Africa from 1986 to 1989 and of the South African Geographical Society from 1989 to 1991. At a time when Apartheid limited collaboration for South African researchers, she built networks internationally to facilitate research.

== Early life and education ==
Frances Niven was born in 1949 in Pietermaritzburg, Natal Province, South Africa to Cynthia Mary (née Hosking) and John McGregor "Jack" Niven. Both of her parents were academics. Prior to his marriage, her father had served in the South African Air Force and during World War II was assigned by the Royal Air Force to missions in Egypt, Italy, Sudan, and Yugoslavia. She was the eldest of three daughters including her sisters Joan and Sheila. Around 1950, the family moved to Bulawayo, in Southern Rhodesia, where he worked at the Teacher's College until 1965. That year, the family returned to Natal, and Jack became a senior lecturer at the University of Natal. Niven also enrolled at the University of Natal and graduated with a Bachelor of Science in 1969 and a postgraduate Honours degree in 1971.

== Career ==
In January 1972, Niven was appointed as a climatologist at the University of Witwatersrand in the Department of Geography and Environmental Science. Niven conducted fieldwork and regularly scheduled trips to Pilgrim's Rest for her students to gain firsthand experience in research. She married W. A. L. Gamble and together they had a daughter Caryn. In 1982, she earned her PhD, from the University of Natal with a thesis called The Management of Karst Cave Ecosystems in the Transvaal. It was the first work in South Africa, and according to professor Margaret E. Marker, the only work up to Gamble's death which evaluated cave climatology and advocated for cave conservation.

Gamble's various works, which included more than twenty publications on caves, examined not only natural phenomena like radiation levels, but also the impact of human development and tourists upon cave systems. In her extensive work on cave conservation, she recommended that scientists be involved in the management and creation of guidelines for the preservation and use of cave ecosystems. Among the issues she noted were that tourists and city planners often caused environmental deterioration. Among the problems caused by urbanization, she noted pollution, including sewage, agricultural contamination, and smoke; changes in ventilation and airflow; hydrology changes caused by the development of agriculture, buildings, roads, parking lots, and pumping stations; and damage due to blasting. Issues introduced and caused by visitors included litter and graffiti, lighting systems and lampenflora, interchange of flora and fauna, and removal of materials like guano and geological formations.

Gamble began lecturing part-time in 1985 first in the Department of Town and Regional Planning and then in the School of Mechanical Engineering. She remained linked with the University of Witwatersrand until 1995. Her work on environmental education for youth included publications, competitions, and clean-up efforts at various sites, emphasizing the need to protect caves. She served as the president of Environmental Education Association of South Africa (EEASA) between 1986 and 1989 and was an officer of the organization until 1992. She was particularly noted during her tenure at EEASA for attracting sponsors to keep their journal afloat and establishing administrative procedures which allowed South African scholars access to cross-border collaborations. Gamble was a founding member of the Cave Research Organisation of South Africa, an association focused on increasing professionalism and scientific research in speleology in the country. She was also a member of the British Cave Research Association and the United States-based National Speleological Society. She served as the South African delegate to the International Union of Speleology, and was president of the South African Geographical Society between 1989 and 1991.

== Death and legacy ==
Gamble died of colon cancer on 27 March 1997 at the Brenthurst Clinic in Braamfontein and was buried on 14 April in Johannesburg. Scholar Stephen A. Craven, noted in 1992, that her contributions were "the most exhaustive work on cave conservation in South Africa". During a time when Apartheid policies restricted the ability for scholars within South Africa from collaborating with international researchers, Gamble introduced interdisciplinary curricula for environmental science at the University of the Witwatersrand and built networks with international partners to facilitate education and research.

== Selected works ==
- Niven, F. M. (April 1975). "The Modification Of Selected Counter Radiation Empirical Equations for Application to Johannesburg". South African Geographical Journal. 57 (1). Braamfortein, South Africa: South African Geographical Society: 36–45. Bibcode:1975SAfGJ..57...36N. doi:10.1080/03736245.1975.10559545. ISSN 0373-6245. OCLC 4934812729.
- Niven, F. M.; Hood, G. M. (April 1978). "Diurnal atmospheric characteristics of the Sterkfontein Tourist Cave". South African Journal of Science. 74. Marshalltown, Transvaal: South African Association For The Advancement Of Science: 134–135. hdl:10520/AJA00382353_6986. ISSN 0038-2353. OCLC 8132675975.
- Gregory, W. L.; Gamble, F. M. (1980). The Wolkberg Cave System: The Report to the Transvaal Provincial Administration. Johannesburg, South Africa: Cave Research Organisation of South Africa. ISBN 978-0-620-04675-6.
- Gamble, F. M. (September 1980). "Rainfall in the Namib Desert Park". Madoqua. 12 (3). Windhoek, Namibia: Nature Conservation and Tourism Branch of the South West Africa Administration: 175–180. ISSN 1010-2299. OCLC 5878506911.
- Gamble, Frances M. (1981). "Alpha-Radiation in Karst Areas of the Transvaal, South Africa". Transactions. 8 (4). Great Hucklow, Buxton: British Cave Research Association: 254–260.
- Gamble, F. M. (November 1981). "Disturbance of Underground Wilderness in Karst Caves". International Journal of Environmental Studies. 18 (1). London: Gordon and Breach Science Publishers: 33–39. Bibcode:1981IJEnS..18...33G. doi:10.1080/00207238108709921. ISSN 0020-7233. OCLC 4657541085.
- Gamble, Frances Margaret (1983). The Management of Karst Cave Ecosystems in the Transvaal (PhD). Pietermaritzburg, South Africa: University of Natal. OCLC 871279548.
- Gamble, F. M. (1987). Environmental Education in Southern Africa: A Directory of Informal and Non-Formal Activities. Pretoria, South Africa: Foundation for Research Development, CSIR. ISBN 978-0-7988-3828-3.
- Gamble, Frances (August 1987). "Geographers and Ecosystems: A Point of View". Southern African Journal of Environmental Education. 5. Howick, KwaZulu-Natal: Environmental Education Association of Southern Africa: 24, 26. ISSN 0256-7504. OCLC 8600944908.
- Gamble, Frances (April 1988). "Educational Resource Identification in the Environment". Southern African Journal of Environmental Education. 7. Howick, KwaZulu-Natal: Environmental Education Association of Southern Africa: 26–29. ISSN 0256-7504. OCLC 5878013822.
- Gamble, F. M.; Moore, Annelize (1990). Environmental Education in Southern Africa: A Directory of Informal and Non-Formal Activities (2nd ed.). Pretoria, South Africa: Department of Environmental Affairs. OCLC 85912955.
- Gamble, F. M. (September 1992). "Geographers and the Environment in a Changing Southern Africa". South African Geographical Journal. 74 (2). Braamfortein, South Africa: South African Geographical Society: 72–74. doi:10.1080/03736245.1992.10586400. ISSN 0373-6245. OCLC 5878482359.
