= Moeketsi =

Moeketsi can be a masculine given name, a middle name, or a surname. Notable people with the name include:

== Given name ==
- Moeketsi Letseka, South African professor
- Moeketsi Majoro, Mosotho politician
- Moeketsi Sekola (born 1989), South African football forward

== Middle name ==
- Moses Moeketsi Mosuhli (born 1981), Mosotho marathon runner

== Surname ==
- Aupa Moeketsi (born 1994), South African football defender
- Khethiwe Moeketsi, South African politician
- Kippie Moeketsi (1925–1983), South African jazz musician
- Sizwe Moeketsi, South African rapper
