= Carthage High Commercial Studies Institute =

Academic institution in Tunisia

IHEC Carthage
- معهد الدراسات التجارية العليا بقرطاج
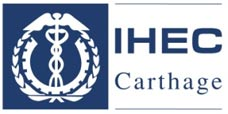
- IHEC Carthage logo.
- Type: Public
- Established: 1942
- Location: Carthage, Tunisia; 36°49′34.1″N 10°10′40.2″E
- Language: Arabic, French, English
- Website: www.ihec.rnu.tn
- Location within Tunisia

The Institut des Hautes Etudes Commerciales de Carthage (Arabic: معهد الدراسات التجارية العليا بقرطاج) or IHEC Carthage is the first business school in Tunisia, it was founded in 1942.

It is ranked as 1st business school in Tunisia and 6th for French-speaking Africa as for 2011.

== History ==
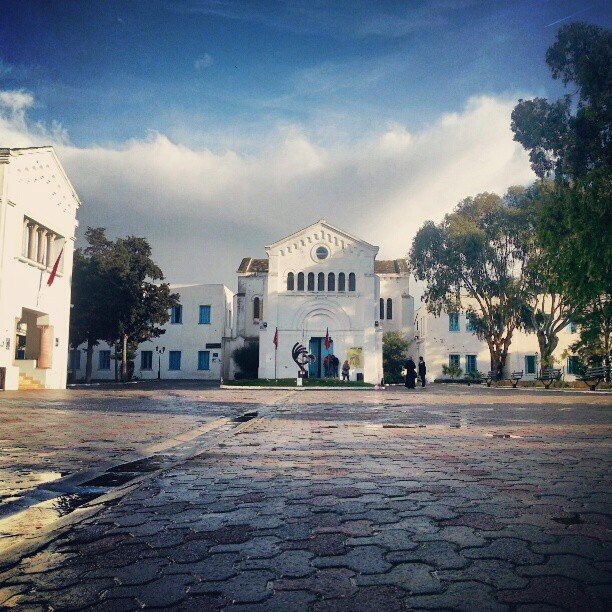
IHEC Carthage square.

IHEC Carthage was established in 1942 and formerly called Carthage Business School as the first business school establishment in Tunisia, yet in 1967 the school became the Carthage High Commercial Studies Institute and was organized according to the law N°77-319 on March 30, 1977.

== Departments ==
The IHEC Carthage has six independent departments:

- Management
- Economy
- Finance
- Law
- Accounting
- Quantitative methods
- Data processing

== Notable alumni ==
- Ali Zouaoui
- Nejib Belkadhi
- Sofiane Bouhdiba
- Faten Kallel
- Slim Khalbous

== See also ==
- University of Carthage
