= South African Journal =

South African Journal may refer to:

- South African Journal of Science
- South African Journal of Economics
- South African Medical Journal
- South African Geographical Journal
- South African Law Journal
