= Institut supérieur des Métiers de l'Audiovisuel =

Private higher-education institution in Cotonou, Benin

Institut supérieur des Métiers de l'Audiovisuel (ISMA)
- Established: 2006
- Affiliations: AUF
- President: Marcellin Zannou
- Director: Noukpo Agossou
- Location: Cotonou, Benin; 6.3527°N 2.3639°E
- Website: Official website

Institut supérieur des Métiers de l'Audiovisuel (ISMA) is a private technical institution of higher education founded in Benin in 2006. It offers professional training programs at the bachelor's and master's levels.

== History ==
=== Administration ===
- President - Founder: Marcellin Zannou
- President of the Scientific and Pedagogical Council: Ascension Bogniaho
- Director: Noukpo Agossou

== Programs ==
Programs offered at ISMA include:

- Audiovisual journalism
- Film and TV production
- Image professions
- Sound professions
- Editing and post-production
- Production management
- Equipment engineering and operation

== Awards ==
During the XII edition of the Clap-Ivoire Festival held in Abidjan from September 4 to 8, 2012, ISMA students won a total of four trophies for their productions representing Benin and Togo.
