= Nkiru Nzegwu =

Nigerian painter and author

- Born: March 22, 1954 (age 72); Onitsha, Nigeria

Education
- Education: University of Ottawa (PhD)
- Thesis: Encounters in Art Appreciation. PhD dissertation, University of Ottawa (1989)

Philosophical work
- Era: 21st-century philosophy
- Region: Western philosophy
- School: Continental
- Institutions: State University of New York at Binghamton
- Main interests: Feminist philosophy

Nkiru Nzegwu (born March 22, 1954) is a Nigerian philosopher, art historian, scholar, curator, and painter. She is a Distinguished Professor at State University of New York at Binghamton.

She is the author of several books, and has over sixty published articles and book chapters. In 2020, she was appointed Professor Extraordinarius for the School of Transdisciplinary Research and Graduate Studies at the University of South Africa. She was the Nelson Mandela Visiting Professor at Rhodes University from 2023 to 2024.

== Education and early life ==
Nzegwu was born to parents of Igbo ethnicity in Onitsha, Nigeria. She went on to study at the University of Ife (now Obafemi Awolowo University), where she received both her BA and MA. Before academia, she engaged in media production as a radio producer and graphic designer. She also took part in Voices of Nigeria (1981-1983), which was the onset of her artistic work.

Nzegwu went on to receive a doctorate in philosophy from the University of Ottawa in 1989. Nzegwu’s dissertation Encounters in Aesthetic Appreciation observed challenging theories of aesthetics, under Andrew Lugg.

== Philosophical career ==
When she first began at the State University of New York at Binghamton, she was in both the philosophy and art history departments, where she earned her tenure in 1996. Later, she moved her philosophy appointment into African Studies. She moved her art history line to the Interpretation and Culture (PIC) graduate program, where she served as the coordinator. She taught at Binghamton University for over twenty-five years where she specialised in feminist/African women's studies, African philosophy, and African diaspora art. Some of the courses she offered - including 'Philosophy of Orisha worship,' 'African Women and Feminism,' and 'Philosophy of Colonialism' - were the first ever university courses in the United States on these topics.

== Writings and opinions on family structure ==
In 2006, Nzegwu wrote a book entitled Family Matters: Feminist Concepts in African Philosophy of Culture, which explored the structures of Igbo families and the concepts of feminism that existed within them. In the book, she studies African families through the lens of contemporary human rights and the need for a re-evaluation of these traditional ideas, considering the modern rulings by judges towards women that selectively appeal to culture and the interpretation of traditions.

She emphasizes the importance of differentiating between conceptions of African family and society rooted in the viewpoint of British anthropologists, whose views developed within the ideology of imperialism, misrepresenting the precolonial Igbo family. To avoid misrepresentation, she says her studies were centered on an understanding of the political nature and distribution of rights and entitlements within the Igbo family.

She focuses her area of study on northwestern Igboland, a region that, prior to colonization, was a non-gendered and non-patriarchal society. She states that families in this region were not dominated by men's control, nor was women's sole purpose to serve the needs of men. She claims the early Christian missionaries and colonial anthropologist viewed the society through their patriarchal and male-privileging values that make up Western epistemology.

She believes that the problems of gender subordination within Africa are subsequently traced to European colonial policies and the African man's one-sided construction of a family is due to colonial imposition. She associates the redefined women's identity as solely a "wife," and their level of dependency status correlates to colonial policies, as well as showing the parallels.

== Intellectual contributions and theoretical framework ==
Nzegwu's work pushes feminist theory. A core claim she makes throughout her work emphasizes how Western systems, when imposed on African societies, dismantle African frameworks. For instance, gender is often treated as a male and female binary, a framework which does not map neatly onto African societies. She introduces the concept of "dual-sex system," where Igbo men and women organized in political groups. This structure led to a level of autonomy and political power for African women. Nkiru Nzegwu argues that colonial rule, through the introduction of new laws and policies, dismantled social systems that had previously supported women’s independence.

Nzegwu has also examined the morality of motherhood within a communal Igbo context, emphasizing how African values and social relationships are rooted in the bond between mother and child. In her essay The Epistemological Challenge of Motherhood to Patriliny, she argues that a child’s understanding of right and wrong originates from the mother, and that this foundational relationship shapes how the child later interacts with other people. According to Nkiru Nzegwu, communal life and ethics among the Igbo are structured around the concept of motherhood, and the breakdown of relational ties weakens the community as a whole. She argues that colonial anthropologists, working from the assumption that wives were subordinate to their husbands, failed to recognize the broader social significance of motherhood.

Through this argument, Nzegwu seeks to reaffirm the central role motherhood plays within Igbo society. She maintains that colonial-era scholarship was unable to properly acknowledge this because it operated within a limited and restrictive worldview.

In her essay, "Omummu: Disassembling Subordination and Reasserting Endogenous Powers" (2020), Nzegwu further develops her claims from a political perspective. She analyzes Ikporo-Onitsha, an organization made up of adult daughters who establish omummu, to explain the role of motherhood in politics. For her work, omummu represents autonomy among women. Nzegwu also discusses the role of the omo or Queen Mother as a representative of authority who lends her voice to many conversations, even control over the military.

Her 2006 monograph Family Matters is heavily quoted throughout the practice of African studies, women's studies, post-colonial studies, and African feminist theory. Lewis R. Gordon recognized her works and claims "she has created her place in Africana philosophy."

== Art scholarship and curation ==
Nzegwu has had a long career in art history, visual art, and curation. A major theme throughout her artwork is the assumptions of Africa and the misinterpretations that exist as a result of colonialism. In the Journal of Aesthetics and Art Criticism, Nzegwu argues with artist Susan Vogel and Arthur Danto that make claims about African conception of art which Nzegwu heavily critiques as Euro centered. In 2018, she wrote an essay in Journal of Art Historiography analyzing oríkì as a Yoruba art form based on Rowland Abiodun's work. Her claim posited that African art must be evaluated through its original cultural framework, based on where it came from, as opposed to imposed Western structures.

She continues the work of decolonizing concepts around gender and African women, using literature. Nzegwu has edited two volumes on Nigerian and Contemporary African art in the 1990s.

Nzegwu curated exhibitions across the diaspora in the United States, Canada, and Nigeria. She has had shows at the Art Gallery of Toronto, The Power Plant, and A Space. She has also had shows at the Mitchell Museum in Illinois and Lagos in 1989. She founded her own gallery, Onira Arts Africa gallery in Ottawa, one of the earliest galleries in Canada dedicated specifically to African art. Afterwards, she created Africa House in New York, a multipurpose cultural space as well as art gallery, highlighting African visual art.

She was an associate producer on the documentary Nigerian Art: Kindred Spirits (1996), a Smithsonian documentary. This documentary explores the life of Nigerian Art and included notable artists such as sculptor Ben Enwonwu, whose work emphasizes traditional masquerade and African belief systems, and environment-themed paintings by Ona Brekpaya.

== Teaching and advocacy ==
Nzegwu's teachings across disciplines such as art and history have attempted to bridge the gaps her research highlights. Her focus areas have ranged from decolonization of contemporary art to burial grounds in New York.

In 2010, she founded The African Knowledge Project, that aims to promote and disseminate "Africa-centered, evidence-based knowledge on Africa and African Diaspora." Her website africaresource.com is an educational website that "features content that raises awareness of conversations taking place in African communities on topics ranging from feminism to economic development." This site has had over 10 million visitors and has received a “Best of the Web” citation from PBS."

== Scholarly accomplishments ==
Nzegwu is the founder and editor of several scholarly journals, including Ijele: Art Journal of the African World and Journal on African Philosophy. She is "one of the original founding editors" of the award-winning JENdA: A Journal of Culture and African Women Struggles.

She currently serves on the Advisory Board for The Black Scholar journal.

From 2004 to 2010 she served as chair of the Igbo Studies Association.

== Publications ==
- Nzegwu, Nkiru (1994). "Gender Equality in a Dual-Sex System: the Case of Onitsha". Canadian Journal of Law & Jurisprudence. 7, 199401: 73. doi:10.1017/S0841820900002575. ISSN 0841-8209. OCLC 8271677568.
- Nzegwu, Nkiru, ed. (1998). Issues in Contemporary African Art. International Society for the Study of Africa (ISSA) at Binghamton University. ISBN 9781892627001.
- Nzegwu, Nkiru, ed. (1999). Contemporary Textures: Multidimensionality in Nigerian Art. International Society for the Study of Africa (ISSA) at Binghamton University. ISBN 9781892627018.
- Nzegwu, Nkiru (2004). "The Epistemological Challenge of Motherhood to Patriliny". JENdA: A Journal of Culture and African Women Studies (5): 1–18.
- Nzegwu, Nkiru (2020) “Temporality, Oriki and Nigeria’s Contemporary Art.” In “Aesthetic Temporalities Today”. Ed. Gabrielle Genge and Angela Stercken. Columbia University Press. pp. 87–100.
- Family Matters: Feminist Concepts in African Philosophy of Culture. Albany, NY: SUNY Pres, 2006.
- The New African Diaspora. Bloomington, IN: Indiana University Press, 2009. (co-editor, with Isidore Okpewho)
- His Majesty Nnaemeka Alfred Ugochukwu Achebe: A Ten-Year Milestone. Endicott, NY: Africa Resource Press, 2013. (editor)
- Onitsha at the Millennium: Legacy, History and Transformation. Endicott, NY: Africa Resource Press, 2013 (editor)
- Rethinking Motherhood: African and Nordic Perspectives. Endicott, NY: Africa Resource Press, 2020 (co-editor, with Signe Arfred)
