= Horses in Botswana =

Equines and equestrianism in Southern Africa

The horse (tswana: itona; shona: bhiza) was initially introduced to Botswana from South Africa by European explorers and colonists in the 19th century. The number of horses increased sharply in the second half of the 20th century, after the country gained independence, due to their use for hunting and the increasing scarcity of their use for transport. With a population of over 30,000 in 2014, horses are used for subsistence hunting, endurance competitions and tourist safaris.

The presence of horses is most marked in the Maun and Western regions, where the sand of the Kalahari Desert makes it difficult to travel with motorized vehicles. Botswana is home to a dozen different breeds of horse, including Arabians and Thoroughbreds. It is also home to several horse-killing diseases, including African horse sickness, nagana and rabies.

== History ==
The domestic horse (Equus caballus) is not part of Botswana's history and is not native to the country, which is better known for its plains zebras (E. quagga), an emblematic species predated by the spotted hyena (Crocuta crocuta).

The first horses imported into southern Africa came from Cape Town in the 17th century. Most of Botswana's horses were imported from South Africa. There are records of exploration of the territory that became Bechuanaland and then Botswana by the Englishman William Cornwallis Harris in 1836, followed by other white European riders in the 1840s.

=== Under the Bechuanaland protectorate (1885-1966) ===
When the territory known as "Bechuanaland" was declared a British protectorate on 21 May 1884, it took just six weeks for police forces, mostly of British origin, to begin organizing to control the new territory. These included a mounted police force, used in particular to control the border between Bechuanaland and South Africa. The Bechuanaland Mounted Police, created in 1885 by Major Stanley Lowe to maintain order and suppress cattle rustling, was succeeded by the Bechuanaland Border Police in 1889–1890.

Evidence of local contact with horses comes later. In 1916, Khama, the Ksogi (tribal chief) of the Bamangwato people in Bechuanaland, was struck in the knee by a horse; he then invited his son Sekgoma II, who had been in exile for 10 years, to rule in Serowe. In 1954, author John Brown described the presence of ponies in the Gordonia region of the Kalahari Desert, whereas he had previously thought that the desert was not a liveable environment for horses.

In 1961 Botswana's horse population was estimated at 7 663 head. The domestic horse is described as "the aristocrat of Botswana's cattle", since its price is 3 to 6 cows, or 15 to 30 donkeys. The men of the Nyae Nyae region used to hunt giraffes on horseback, but the South West African government declared this illegal in 1953. From then on, horses were used mainly as a means of transport, but hunting undoubtedly continued more cautiously. Game ambushes are carried out at night, when hunters are less likely to be spotted. The Dobe !Kung depended heavily on hunting in the early 1960s, when their population grew and relied on the use of horses, firearms and motorized vehicles.

=== Since Botswana's independence (1966 to present) ===
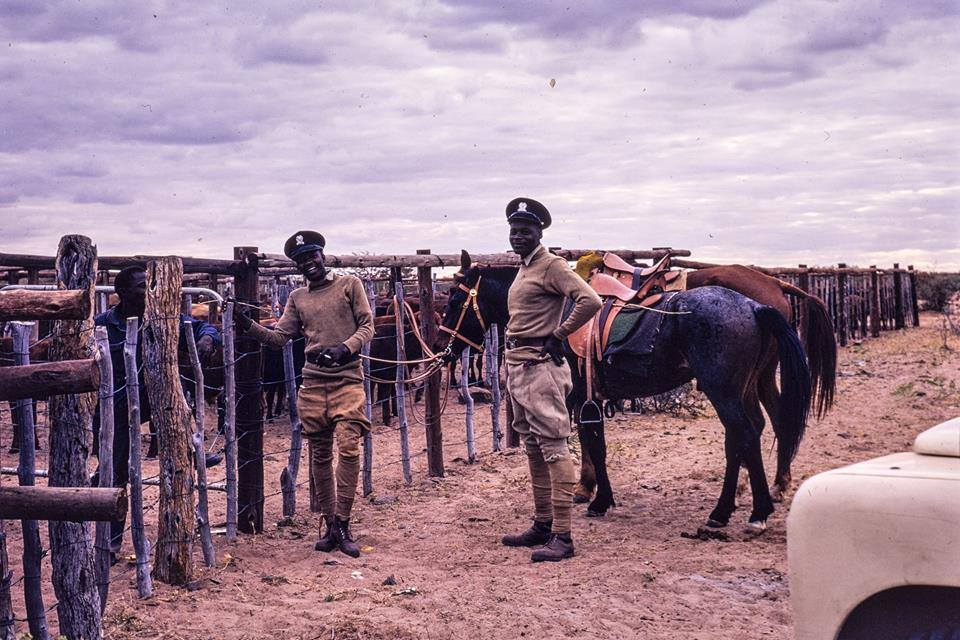
Botswana mounted police in the 1970s

The gradual development of roads and transport infrastructure has made the use of horses unnecessary in some densely populated areas of the country. Nevertheless, the horse population grew from 11,000 head in 1970 to around 34,000 in 1990. One of the main reasons for this development was the popularity of hunting on horseback. Horseback riding became the most effective hunting technique in the 1970s. In the 1970s and 1980s, the San of the Central Kalahari Game Reserve gradually adopted horseback hunting, and at the same time abandoned the use of bows with poisoned arrows in favor of spears, thanks to the speed afforded by horseback riding, as shown by studies carried out in the Xai/Xai region (Ngamiland) between 1973 and 1980.

This was a major change both in their hunting strategy and in their success rate: the use of horses increased the area explored during the hunt. In the 1980s and 1990s, young people able to buy or rent a horse favored this spear hunting technique, thanks to the transmission of riding skills.

== Usages ==
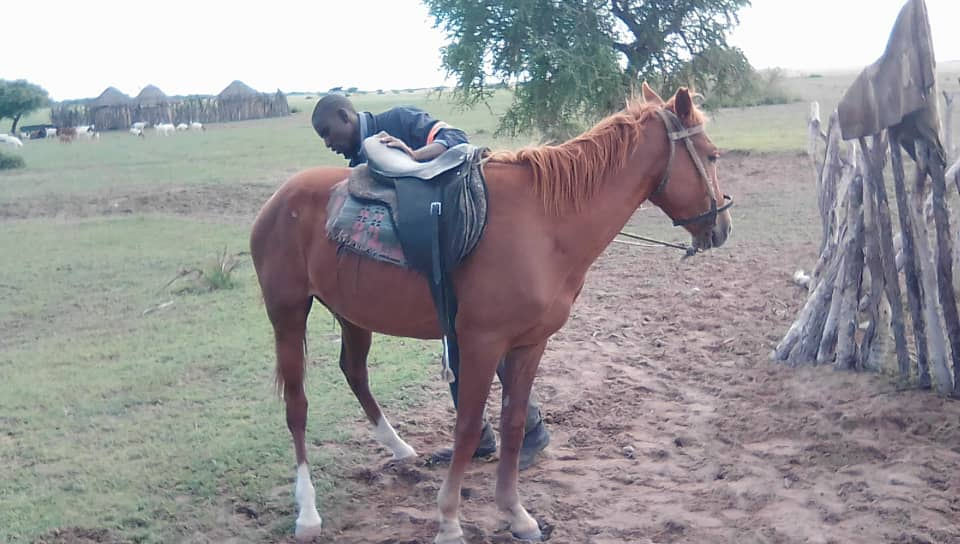
Preparing a horse for a mounted ride, in 2020

Like the donkey, the horse is still used for mounted transport and as horse-drawn vehicle. However, it is only used for this purpose in the Western and Maun regions, due to the poor condition of the roads, which are regularly silted up. Horses are more frequently ridden than harnessed. Karakul sheep breeders in the southern Kalahari use horses, donkeys and mules. Owners of hunting horses use their animals for a variety of other activities.

The International Federation for Equestrian Sports (FEI) database recognizes one national equestrian federation in Botswana, the Horse Society of Botswana (HSB). However, the country has never won a medal at a major international equestrian event (World Equestrian Games or Olympic Games). In 2023, the Horse Society of Botswana is organizing ten official competitions in the country: four in show jumping, one in dressage, one in combined driving, five in endurance riding, one in reining, one in acrobatics, one in para-dressage and one in para-harnessing.

In her thesis defended in 2020 at the University of Botswana, Tinieri Maeresera argues that horse manure can fertilize Cenchrus ciliaris plantations.

=== Hunting ===
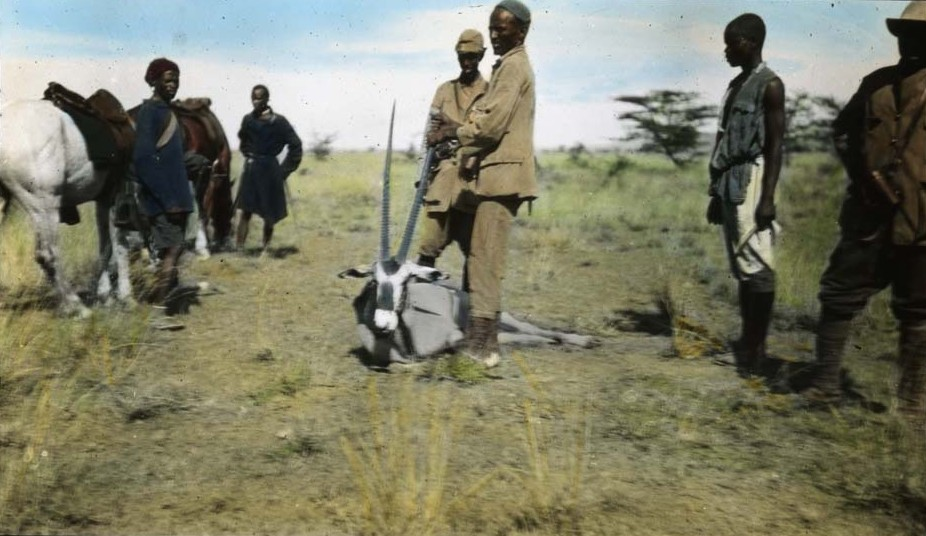
Hunting an Oryx gazelle with horses in 1909

Mounted subsistence hunting is legally permitted under Botswana law, allowing native people to hunt in reserves with the aid of horse, shotgun and hunting dogs. The Wildlife and National Parks Wildlife Act of 1992 prohibits hunting from motorized vehicles, which explains the use of horses. Botswana's laws differ from those of neighboring Namibia, which bans hunting on horseback altogether. Horse hunting is particularly common along the border between Botswana and Namibia.

The Mbanderu use it for long-distance hunting, sometimes accompanied by !Kung. Around a third of Xai/Xai hunters are familiar with hunting on horseback with firearms or spears.

Mounted hunting is particularly effective for stalking elands, giraffes, and oryx gazelles. It is also very effective for hunting large antelopes, such as eland (Taurotragus oryx). There is also some bushmeat poaching (particularly in the Okavango delta), based on the recent development of horse-drawn pursuit practices, which is detrimental to tourism.

=== Endurance ===
According to the president of the Botswana Endurance Riding Association (BERA), Sharon Du Plessis, the national practice of endurance riding dates back to the late 1990s, when several Botswana riders jointly realized that there were enough of them to organize viable competitions in their own country, rather than travel to South Africa. The practice gradually gained in importance, and by 2006 had two local clubs, one in Ghanzi and the other in Lobatse. BERA uses a vet-gate system for its competitions, in accordance with the rules laid down by the Fédération équestre internationale. The endurance racing season usually runs from February to June, when temperatures can be very hot. Around six endurance races are held each year in Botswana, usually over 80 km.

One of the most famous endurance races is at Tau Tona Lodge in Ghanzi, in the Kalahari Desert. The Lobatse race, another prestigious event, takes place on stonier ground and attracts participants from Spain, Abu Dhabi, Britain, Namibia and South Africa. Botswanan riders compete in South Africa to qualify for the longer distances required for the World Endurance Championships.

Endurance is generally practiced with an Arabian horse, a breed bred in Botswana.

=== Safaris ===
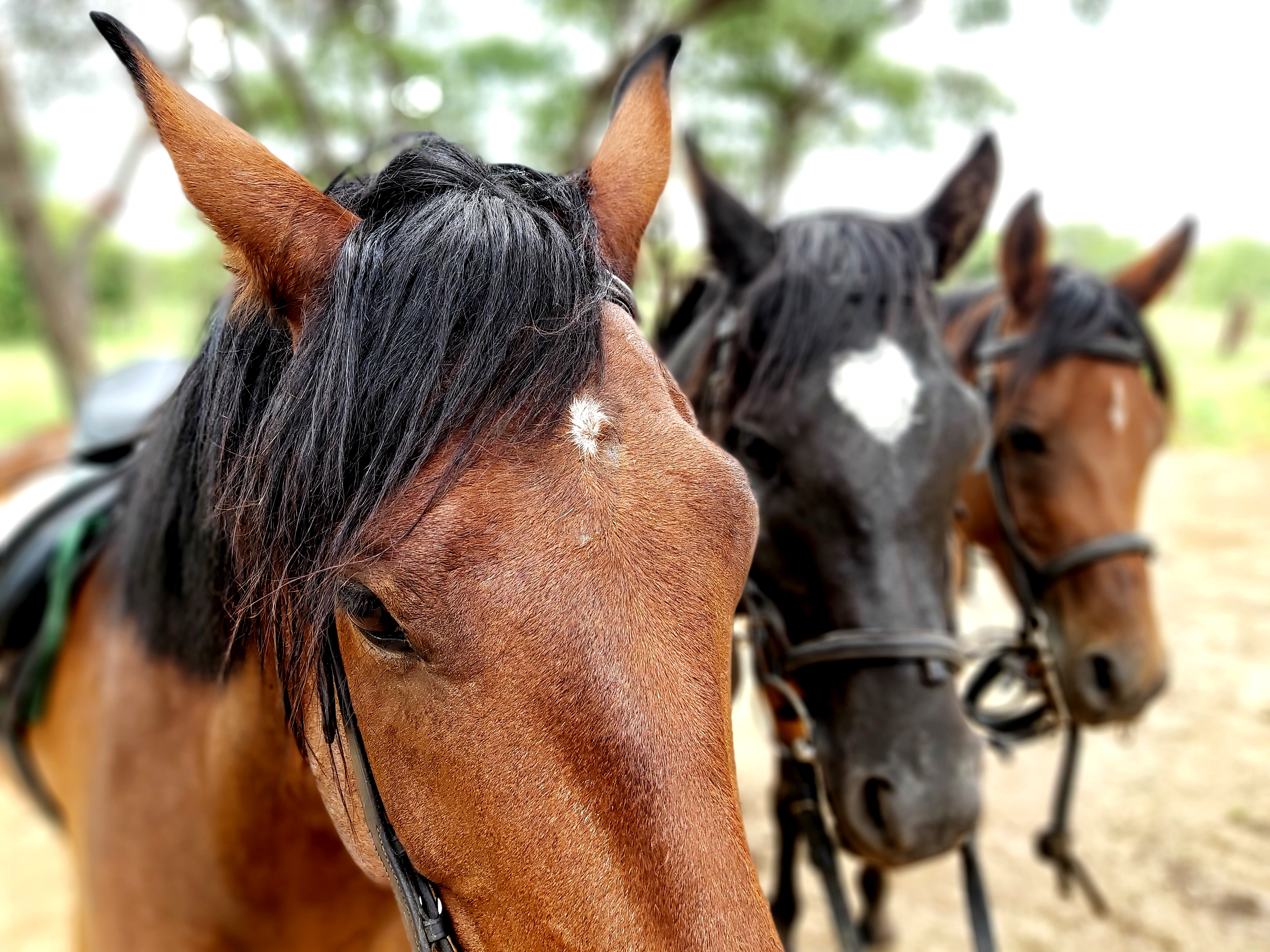
Working horses in the Paje region in 2020

Botswana is one of Africa's most popular destinations for mounted equestrian tourism, in the adventure tourism category. A sample survey published in 2021 shows that horse-riding activities are highly appreciated as part of an ecotourism approach.

Several guidebook authors describe Botswana (in 2010 and 2022) as one of the best African destinations for a horseback safari, thanks in particular to the variety of its wildlife. These safaris are generally reserved for riders over the age of twelve who are comfortable at all three gaits. Mounted safaris are available in the Okavango Delta and along the Zambezi River, also with Victorian-style horse-drawn carriages. This is a potentially dangerous activity, as predators (lions, etc.) are likely to attack the horses.

Horse breeds used on safari include Thoroughbreds, half-bloods, Arabians, Anglo-Arabians, Friesian crosses and the local sport horse, a cross between the Boer and the American Saddlebred. All are trained and measure between 1.42 m and 1.73 m.

== Breeding ==
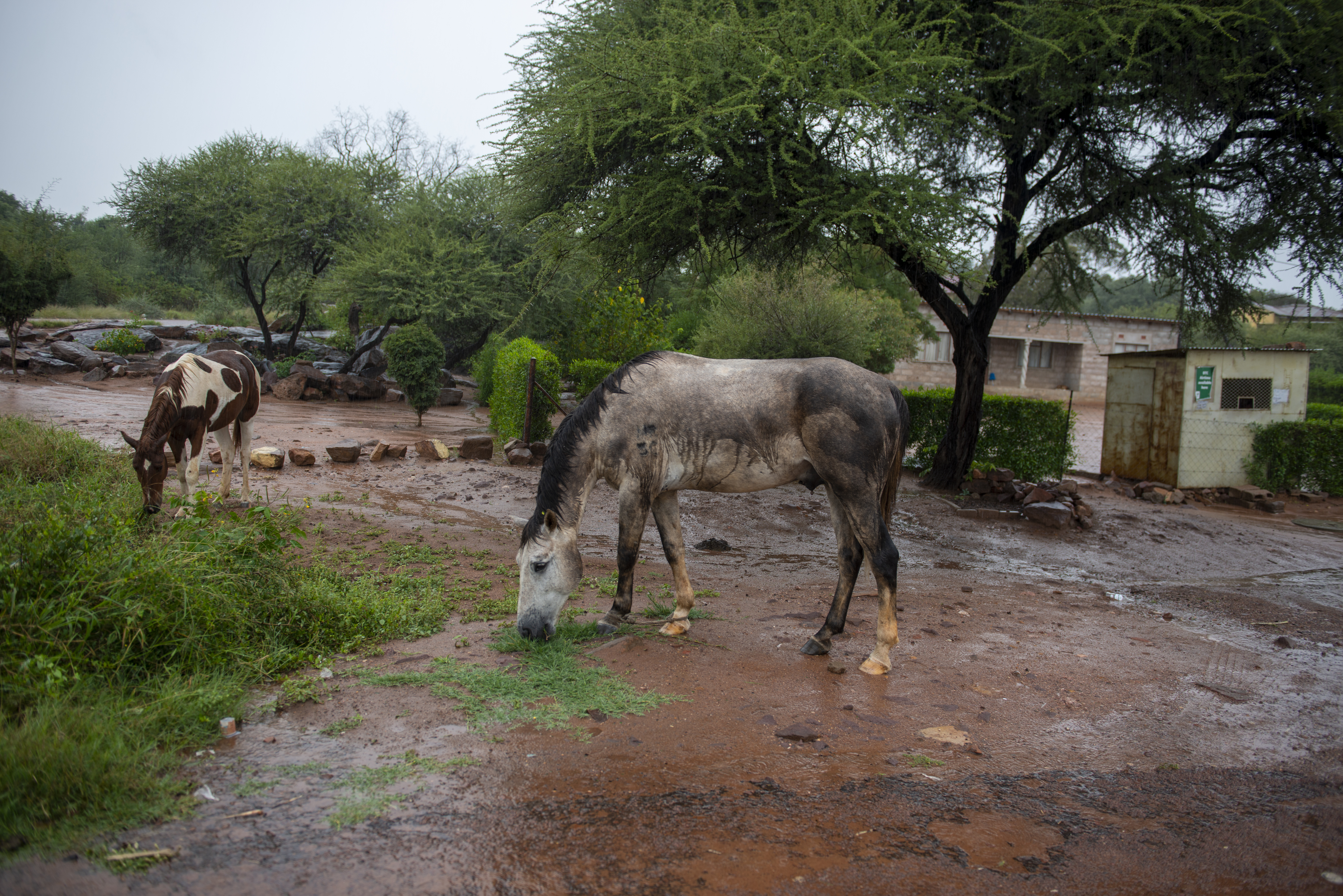
Two horses at Mochudi in 2022

The Tswana, a pastoral people, are accustomed to breeding all kinds of domestic animals. A few !Kung began owning horses in the 1960s, either for themselves or as part of a job for a white farmer.

The book Equine Science (2017) provides no estimate of Botswana's horse population; however, Chris J. Mortensen indicates on the basis of data from the Food and Agriculture Organization of the United Nations (FAO) the presence of a herd of 30 907 head in 2014.

In 2008, Oladimeji Idowu Oladele and Milly Monkhei provided the following gendered and quantified data on the ownership of a total of 25,387 horses in the country:

Number of horses owned by region of Botswana and by gender
Region	Horses owned by men	Horses owned by women
Southern region	3 316	526
Gaborone region	2 079	370
Central region	4 795	590
Francistown region	869	168
Maun region	5 319	1 226
Western region	5 275	854
Total	21 653	3 734

The Maun and Western regions breed the most horses. There are also geographical differences in horse ownership: women in the Maun region own more horses than those in other regions.

Little is known about local horse breeding. Most horses in Botswana are kept on traditional farms, which presumably use little controlled selective breeding.

=== Bred breeds ===
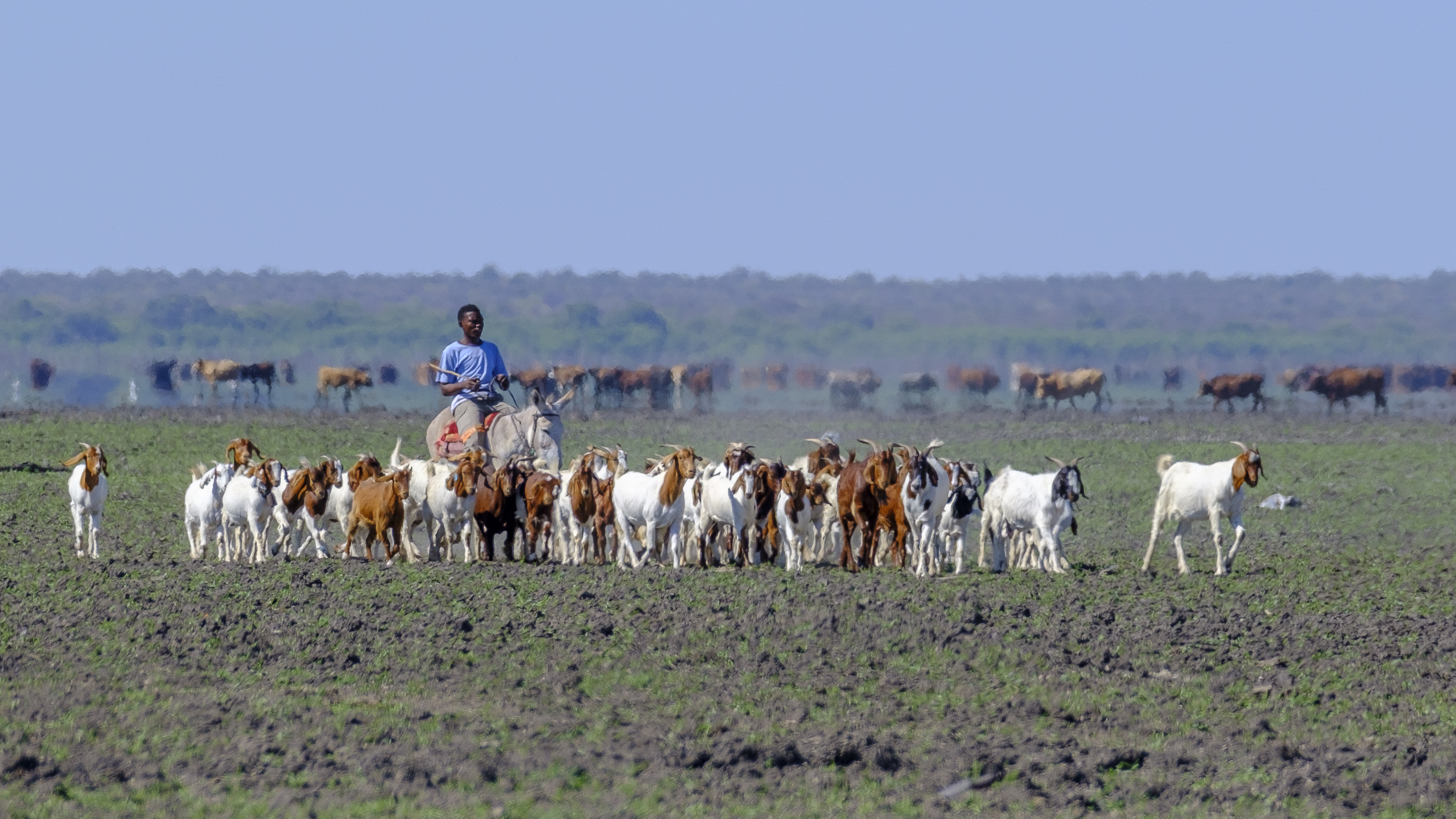
Farm rider preparing to move his goats in 2019

The DAD-IS database lists twelve breeds of horses that currently are used in Botswana, though formthe most part these are not local native breeds: Appaloosa, Arabian, South African Boer, Hanoverian, Kalahari pony, Nooitgedachter, Quarter Horse, Thoroughbred, Tswana, Warmblood and Welsh pony.

The Thoroughbred is bred locally for outbreeding, working equitation and income generation, as well as for cultural reasons such as horse racing and sport riding. The Appaloosa, Quarter Horse, Nooitgedacht, Arabian and sport horse are bred for the same reasons, plus hunting, pack farming and manure recovery. The Boer is also used for children's riding. The Tswana is bred for all the above purposes, as well as for its meat.

No data are available on the use of the Hanoverian or the Welsh.

The Kalahari pony is described as a "locally adapted breed", but no population or usage data are available.

=== Diseases and parasitism ===
Botswana is endemic for rabies, which can affect horses with rare frequency (3.13% of rabies cases detected in the country between 1989 and 2006). Numerous outbreaks of equine influenza were reported in South Africa, Lesotho and Namibia, near the border with Botswana in 1987, but no cases have been recorded in Botswana; as soon as the outbreaks were reported, horse movements were restricted.

==== Tsetse flies and Nagana ====
The hottest regions of southern Africa are infested with tsetse flies (Glossina), which transmit trypanosomes, blood parasites that cause a fatal disease in horses, nagana. These flies are found along the Limpopo river, particularly where it meets its tributary, the Pongola river. The explorer Frank Vardon discovered these insects in the region while traveling on horseback in 1845 or 1846.

==== African horse sickness ====
African horse sickness is a virus transmitted by tiny midges which regularly devastates southern Africa. Epidemiological monitoring shows that between 1995 and 2004, 99 clinical cases were detected in Botswana, all in non-vaccinated horses. The vector species in Botswana are Culicoides miombo and Culicoides imicola, which is the most frequently found according to research carried out in Gaborone in 1997.

This has an economic impact on horse owners (e.g. safari organizers), but also an emotional loss. Carnivores who eat the meat of an infected horse may in turn be contaminated.

There are campaigns to raise awareness among horse owners and get them vaccinated.

== Culture ==
In The Long Ride Home (2014), author Rupert Isaacson recounts a journey with his autistic son Rowan to ride horses among the Bushmen of Namibia, then in Botswana. Isaacson was banned from Botswana for his support of the San people in the ancestral land conflict in Botswana.

== Bibliography ==
- Hitchcock, Robert (2015). "The politics and economics of community-based natural resource management in Xai/Xai, Ngamiland, Botswana". African Study Monographs. 36 (4). doi:10.14989/202828. ISSN 0285-1601.
- Hitchcock, Robert (1996). "Subsistence Hunting and Resource Management among the Ju/'Hoansi of Northwestern Botswana". African Study Monographs. 17 (4). doi:10.14989/68150. ISSN 0285-1601.
- McIntyre, Chris (2010). Botswana: Okavango Delta – Chobe – Northern Kalahari. Bradt Travel Guides. ISBN 978-1-84162-308-5.
- Morton, Barry (2018). Historical Dictionary of Botswana. Rowman & Littlefield. ISBN 978-1-5381-1133-8.
- Oladele, Oladimeji (2008). Gender ownership patterns of livestock in Botswana. Vol. 20. African Study Monographs.
- Du Plessis, Sharon (2007). Endurance riding in Botswana. Vol. 2. SA Horseman.
- Senyatso, E. K. (1996). "Animal genetic resources in Botswana". Animal Genetic Resources Information. 17. Animal Genetic Resources/Resources génétiques animales/Recursos genéticos animales: 51–60. doi:10.1017/S1014233900000572. ISSN 2076-4022.
