= Mubarak Bashir =

Sudanese poet (died 2021)

- Born: 1952 AD; Khartoum, Sudan
- Died: 11 February 2021
- Occupations: Writer, poet, college professor

Mubarak Bashir (Arabic: مبارك بشير) is a writer, poet, and professor from Sudan.

== His life ==
Bashir was born in Khartoum in 1952, he graduated from the college of Arts of the University of Khartoum, where he received a Bachelor of Philosophy and Language in 1977, he worked in the interest of culture, and earned a Diploma in African and Asian Studies, in the University of Khartoum. He also received a French diploma at the French Cultural Center in Khartoum, and a German diploma at the Herder Institute in East Germany, according to the Sudanese news agency (Sona). He received his PhD. in cultural and educational politics from the Centre for African and Middle Eastern Studies at the University of Leipzig in East Germany in 1986, and in 1983 he received his masters in Arabic Studies from the same German university.

== His works ==
Bashir worked for the Department of Culture under the Ministry of Culture and Information, the National Research Centre, the Centre for Development Information, the Sudan Academy of Communication Sciences and the University of Science and Culture in Omdurman. He has writings published in literature, poetry and journalism; in a press corner entitled "bonds" (Arabic title: Awasir). In 1982, he wrote a collection of poems and lyrical poems, in the Sudanese dialect. Some of his writings:

- "We meet you today, my nation" (Arabic title: Naltaqqk Al-Youm ya Watan).
- “Your Eyes” (Arabic title: Awainatik).
- (Arabic title: ‘Ors Al-Fida’ way a Nasmah).

Many big artists sang his lyrical poems, the late Mohammed Wardi sang (Arabic title: ‘Ors Al-Fida’ way a Nasmah) and Mohammed Al-Amin sang “Your Eyes” (Arabic title: Awainatik).

== Death ==
Bashir died on Thursday, 11 February 2021.
