= African Journal of International Affairs and Development =

Academic journal

- Discipline: International relations, economic development
- Language: English
- Edited by: Jide Owoeye

Publication details
- History: 1995-present
- Publisher: College Press & Publishers
- Frequency: Biannually

Standard abbreviations
- ISO 4: Afr. J. Int. Aff. Dev.

Indexing
- ISSN: 1117-272X
- OCLC no.: 601478269

Links
- Journal homepage; Online access; Online archive

The African Journal of International Affairs and Development is a peer-reviewed biannual academic journal covering the study of Africa in global affairs and development. It is hosted by African Journals OnLine.
