= African Journal of Reproductive Health =

- Discipline: Reproductive health
- Language: English, French
- Edited by: Friday Okonofua

Publication details
- History: 1997–present
- Publisher: Women's Health and Action Research Center
- Frequency: Quarterly
- Impact factor: 0.700 (2016)

Standard abbreviations
- ISO 4: Afr. J. Reprod. Health

Indexing
- ISSN: 1118-4841 (print); 2141-3606 (web)
- LCCN: sn97039451
- JSTOR: 11184841
- OCLC no.: 865269209

Links
- Journal homepage; Online access; Online archive; Journal page at African Journals OnLine; Journal page at Bioline

The African Journal of Reproductive Health/La Revue Africaine de la Santé Reproductive is a peer-reviewed public health journal that covers original research on reproductive health in Africa. It is published by the Women's Health and Action Research Center and the editor-in-chief is Friday Okonofua.

== Abstracting and indexing ==
The journal is abstracted and indexed in:

- Current Contents/Social & Behavioral Sciences
- Index Medicus/MEDLINE/PubMed
- Social Sciences Citation Index

According to the Journal Citation Reports, the journal has a 2016 impact factor of 0.700.
