= Agence universitaire de la Francophonie =

University network based in Montreal, Canada

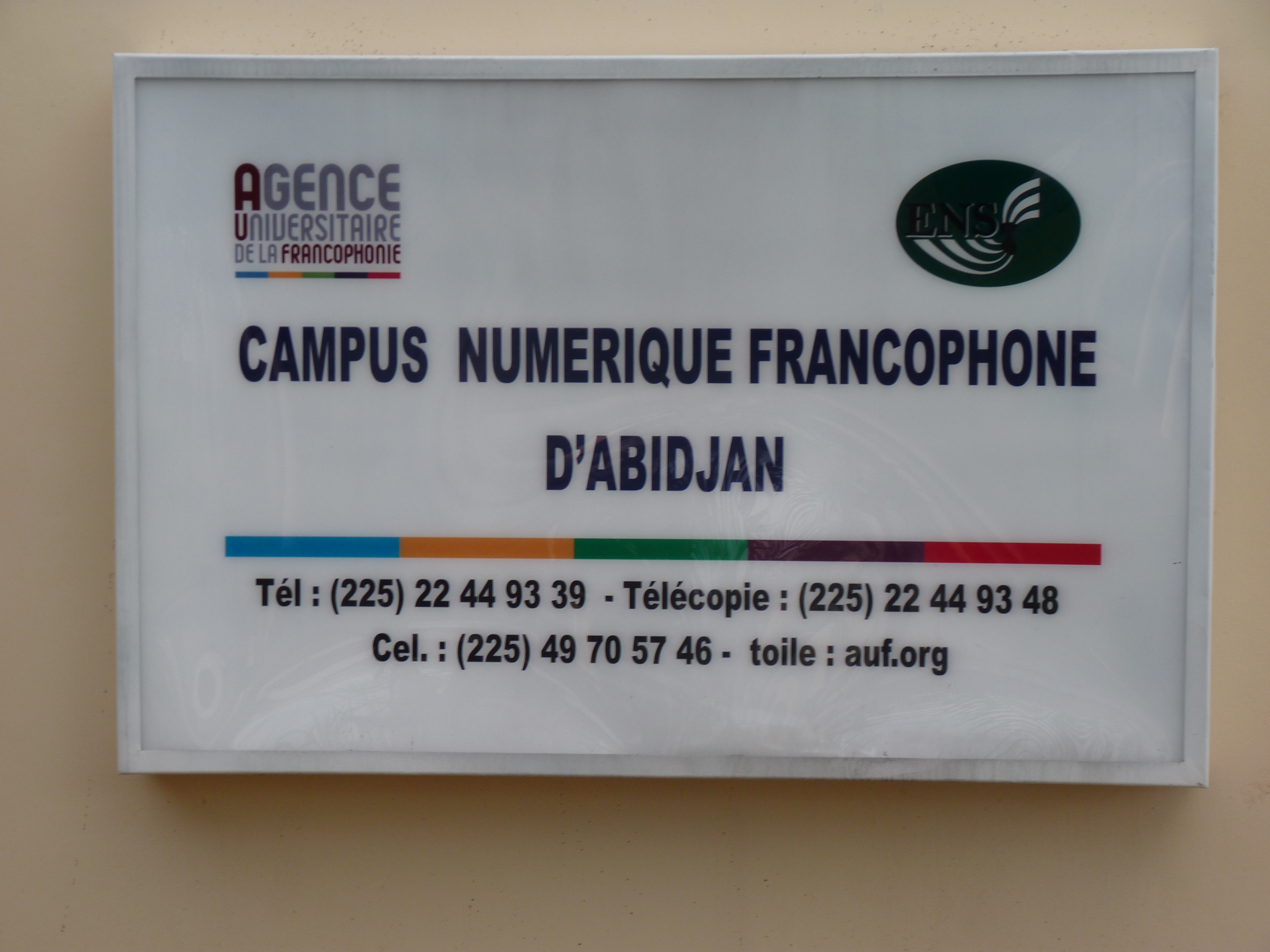
- Predecessor: Association des Universités Partiellement ou Entièrement de Langue Française
- Formation: 13 September 1961; 65 years ago
- Type: Francophone university network
- Headquarters: Montreal, Quebec, Canada
- Coordinates: 45.50175850°N 73.61996090°W
- Members: 1,007 university associations (2020)
- Official language: French
- Rector: Slim Khalbous (since 2019)
- Budget: 37,200,000 € (2019)
- Website: www.auf.org

The Agence universitaire de la Francophonie (AUF; English: University Agency of the Francophonie) is a global network of French-speaking higher-education and research institutions. Founded in Montreal, Quebec, Canada in 1961, as the Association des Universités Partiellement ou Entièrement de Langue Française (AUPELF), the AUF is a multilateral institution supporting co-operation and solidarity among French-speaking universities and institutions. It operates in French-speaking and non-speaking countries of Africa, the Arab world, Southeast Asia, North and South America, Polynesia, the Caribbean, Central, Eastern and Western Europe. As of 2020, the AUF has 1,007 members (public and private universities, institutes of higher education, research centers and institutions, institutional networks, and networks of university administrators) distributed throughout francophone countries on six continents. It is active in 119 countries, and represented by regional offices and information centers on campuses and in institutes. The Association receives funding from the Organisation internationale de la Francophonie (OIF), and its headquarters are located at the Université de Montréal, Quebec.

== History ==
=== Origins ===
In 1959, Jean-Marc Léger (Canadian journalist at Le Devoir) and André Bachand (public-relations director at the University of Montreal) voiced the idea of a worldwide organisation which would create a link between French-speaking universities. On 13 September 1961 in Montreal, some 150 representatives of the French-speaking world created the foundation of what would become Association des Universités Partiellement ou Entièrement de Langue Française (AUPELF), French for the "Association of Partially or Entirely French-speaking Universities." From 1972 to 1975, Robert Mallet chaired the board of directors of AUPELF.

=== Expansion ===
In 1987, during the heads of state summit in Quebec, an "exchange university" project was implemented under the name UREF (Université des Réseaux d'Expression Français, University French Expression Networks). Its purpose was to create a university network for research and education. In November 1993, AUPELF became AUPELF-UREF. In April 1998, in Beirut, AUPELF-UREF became the Agence universitaire de la Francophonie.

=== Reforms ===
To answer the Moncton action plan's request, the AUF undertook reforms in three fields in 1999:

- Modification of its status
- Administration
- Programmes

In 2005, the AUF endowed a four-year program to meet the goals and priorities of the decennial strategic agreement of the institutional French-speaking world. This agreement, adopted in 2004 by member states of the French-speaking world, sets the principles and strategies of the institutional French-speaking world and controls its activities.

== Structure ==
The association is composed of seven bodies:

- General assembly: Main body of the AUF. Every four years, the 774 members of the association gather to decide goals and strategy for the four next years. It oversees the board of directors.
- Association council: Enhances solidarity among higher-education and research institutions of the association, encouraging them to pursue relevant objectives
- Board of directors: The management body, comprising university and government representatives
- Scientific council: Decides the methodology of AUF programs and ensures their academic quality. Its members are selected for their technical and professional skills in culture, science and technology.
- President: Elected by the general assembly for a single four-year term, they head the association council and board of directors.
- Rector: Elected by the board of directors for a four-year term, their primary function is to implement financial commitments by higher-education and research institutions.
- University development and co-operation fund: Administered by the rector

== Activities ==
The primary activities of the AUF are distributed among four scientific administrations, each aiming at a specific goal. These four branches are:

- Language and communication: Supports French-language development through instruction in the scientific disciplines; promotes multilingualism and cultural diversity by stimulating the production, spread and teaching of scientific knowledge in French. Coordinates research projects, training and curriculum reform in linguistics, culture, literature and education. Monitors meetings and scientific conferences, emphasizing publication (particularly online publication). Significantly, more than 2,250 specialists improve understanding of the French-speaking world and the impact of cultural and linguistic diversity on societies.
- Economic development: Fundraising and public relations
- Scientific skill reinforcement: Acts as liaison between scientific departments and regional offices. Administers French-speaking digital campuses and institutes in four-year cycles. Evaluates relations between the association and the French-speaking scientific community in the fields of the environment, water, energy, climate, sustainable development and well-being of populations; supports research.
- Education: Supports communication and information technology in higher education and research; encourages digital development and offers training in the Technologies of Information and Communication (TICE) for teachers, students and staff.

== Partnerships ==
The Agence universitaire de la Francophonie has developed partnerships with three objectives:

- To establish more universities and giving them significant developmental roles
- To develop ties between the AUF, its member institutions and developmental agencies (foundations, NGOs, territorial collectivities, etc.)
- To increase development in the following ways:
  - Place the association's knowledge at the disposal of the projects in question
  - Promote scientific evaluation
  - Use tools of university and scientific co-operation

AUF numbers among its partners the European Union, UNESCO and the World Bank. It has been requested to assist in:

- Project management
- Technical evaluations
- Information technology and communication
- Developmental networks

== Publishing ==
In 2001, the Agence universitaire de la Francophonie facilitated the creation of electronic French-language science journals. Francophone digital campuses were created to support the development of TIC (technologies of information and communication). AUF conducts workshops on the presentation and publication of scientific articles. Financial support is available for selected projects.

== AUF worldwide ==
The AUF's education office and headquarters are in Montreal; central services and a second education office are in Paris. Regional offices have been established in Montreal, Port-au-Prince, Dakar, Yaoundé, Antananarivo, Hanoi, Beirut, Brussels and Bucharest.

== Golden anniversary ==
2011 marked the 50th anniversary of the Agence universitaire de la Francophonie. To mark the occasion AUF promoted the Francophonie throughout the year with events devoted to "50 years of the Agency", celebrating its role as an academic agent of the French-speaking scientific community.

== Networks ==
=== Research ===
- Lexicology, terminology, translation
- Sociolinguistics
- Erosion and hydrology
- Economics
- Demography
- Entrepreneurship
- Biotechnology
- Health sciences

=== Institutional ===
- Veterinary medicine (AEEVTPLF)
- Management (CIDEGEF)
- Medicine (CIDMEF)
- Pharmacy (CIDPHARMEF)
- Law (CIFDUF)
- Engineering (CITEF)
- Journalism (Théophraste)
- Dentistry (CIDCDF)
- Information sciences (AIESI)
- Science and technology (CIRUISEF)
- Urbanization (APERAU)

== See also ==
- Institut de la Francophonie pour l'Informatique - one of its institutions.
- TV5Monde
- Université Senghor (Alexandria)
- Association of Commonwealth Universities
- EAIE
- EURODOC
- Association of African Universities
- Association of Pacific Rim Universities
- European University Association
