= South African Historical Journal =

- Discipline: History of Africa
- Language: English

Publication details
- History: 1969-present
- Publisher: University of South Africa published internationally by Routledge (South Africa)
- Frequency: Quarterly
- Impact factor: 0.302 (2017)

Standard abbreviations
- ISO 4: S. Afr. Hist. J.

Indexing
- ISSN: 0258-2473 (print); 1726-1686 (web)
- LCCN: 2008212516
- OCLC no.: 197155256

Links
- Journal homepage; Online access; Online archive

The South African Historical Journal is a quarterly peer-reviewed academic journal covering research on the Southern African region. It was established in 1969 and is published on behalf of the South African Historical Society by the University of South Africa and published internationally by Taylor & Francis.

== Abstracting and indexing ==
The journal is abstracted and indexed in:

- African Studies Abstracts
- African Studies Abstracts Online
- America: History and Life
- Current Abstracts
- Historical Abstracts
- British Humanities Index
- International Bibliography of the Social Sciences
- International Index to Black Periodicals
- Social Sciences Citation Index
- Arts and Humanities Citation Index

The journal has a 2014 impact factor of 0.484.
