= Faten Kallel =

Tunisian politician

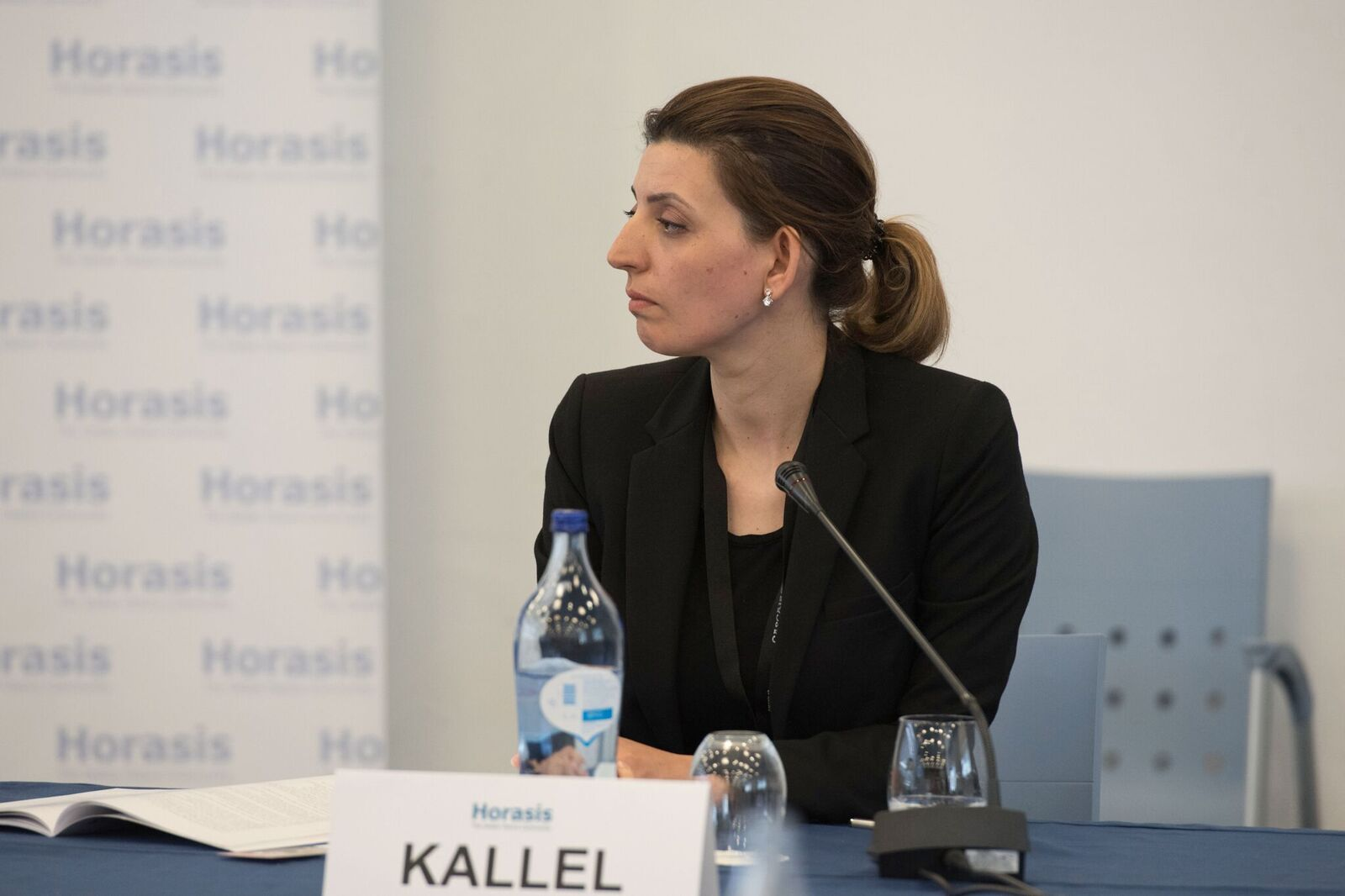
- Kallel in 2018

Secretary of State, Ministry of Youth and Sports
- Incumbent
- Assumed office 27 August 2016
- President: Beji Caid Essebsi

Personal details
- Born: Sousse, Tunisia
- Party: Afek Tounes
- Education: IHEC Carthage, Paris Dauphine University

Faten Kallel (Arabic : فاتن قلال), is a Tunisian politician who serves as the Secretary of State, Ministry of Youth and Sports since 27 August 2016. She is a member of the political party Afek Tounes.

== Education ==
Faten Kallel holds a master's degree in accounting from IHEC Carthage and an MBA from the University of Paris-Dauphine.

== Professional and political career ==
Faten is a management consultant. She worked for several consulting firms in Tunisia such as Grant Thornton and Deloitte. Then, she joined the Ministry of Development, Investment and International Cooperation in February 2015 and she worked as a responsible for the organization and administrative reforms. After that, Faten joined the program Smart Tunisia.

On August 20, 2016, and after the appointment of Youssef Chahed as Head of Government, she was appointed Secretary of State to the Ministry of Youth and Sports as a responsible for Youth.

Kallel was named early 2017 by the World Economic Forum as a Young Global Leaders.
