= African Journal for the Psychological Study of Social Issues =

- Discipline: Psychology
- Language: English
- Edited by: S.K. Balogun

Publication details
- History: 1994–present
- Publisher: African Journals OnLine (Nigeria)
- Frequency: Biannually

Standard abbreviations
- ISO 4: Afr. J. Psychol. Study Soc. Issues

Indexing
- OCLC no.: 32582683

Links
- Journal homepage; Online archive

The African Journal for the Psychological Study of Social Issues is a peer-reviewed academic journal covering the scientific investigation of psychological and social issues and related phenomena in Africa.
