= West Africa (magazine) =

Weekly news magazine published in London 1917–2004

- Categories: News magazines
- Frequency: Weekly
- First issue: 1917
- Final issue: 2004
- Company: West Africa Publishing Company Ltd
- Country: United Kingdom
- Based in: London
- Language: English
- ISSN: 0043-2962

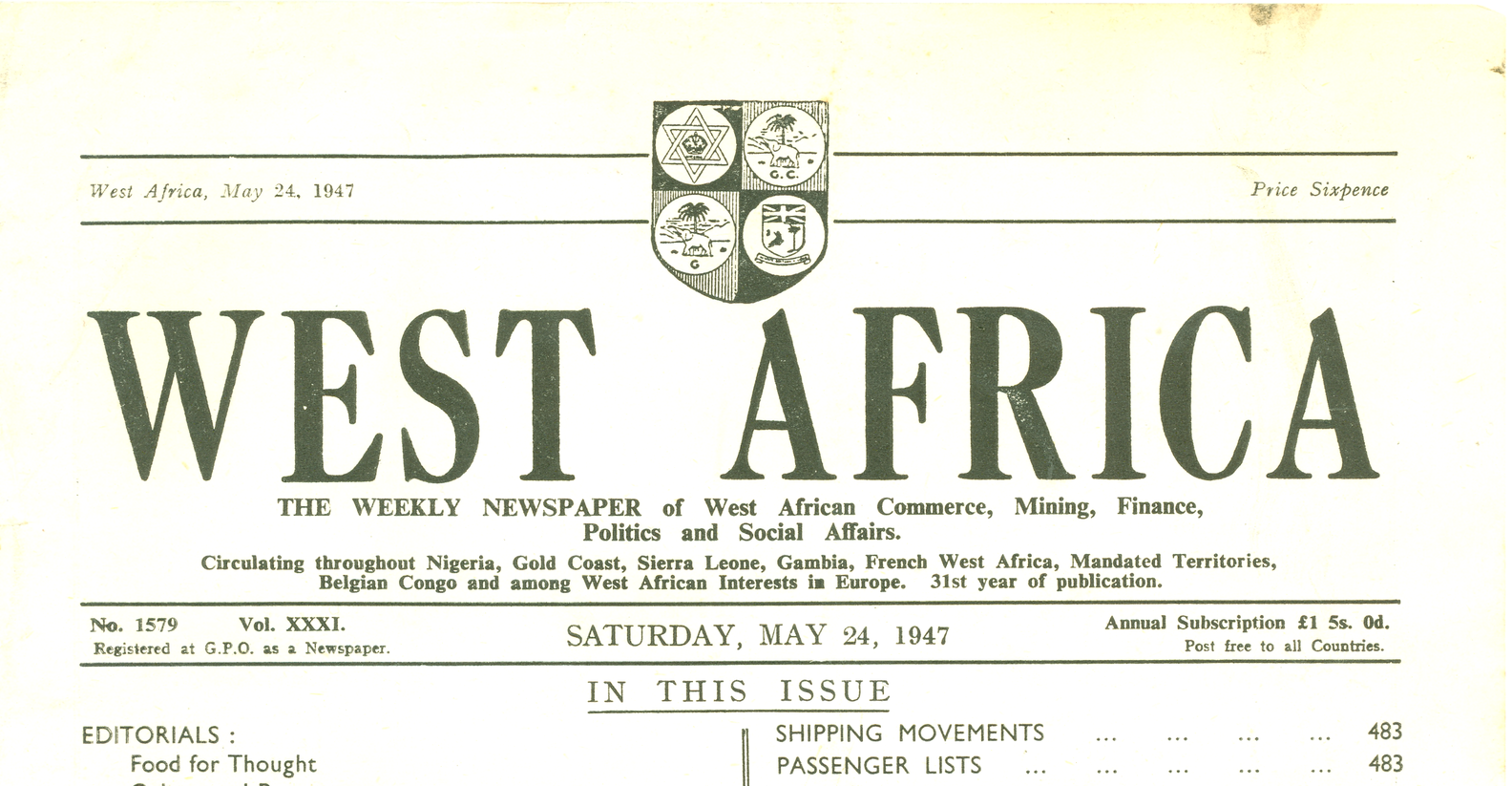
A "West Africa" magazine. The date reads May 24, 1947.

West Africa was a weekly news magazine published in London between 1917 and 2004.

== History ==
A magazine with the name West Africa, started by E. D. Morel, had been published between 1903 and 1906. The title was revived on 3 February 1917 from offices in Fleet Street, London, with the commercial backing of Elder Dempster Shipping Line and the trading company John Holt. It was to appear weekly, initially at a price of sixpence per copy. Its first editorial explained the magazine's raison d'être:

The fabric of the British Empire is complex; but that proportion which constitutes West Africa is in important respects unique. It is that part of Africa nearest to Britain. This is a factor the significance of which has not been fully appreciated until now, when it is clear to all who study maps and statistics that the commercial and food products of West Africa are vitally necessary to the Empire in war, and scarcely less so in peace.

The magazine was intended as "an open forum for the discussion of every question involving the welfare of the peoples of West Africa.... It offers itself as a friend to every cause which holds out a prospect of advancing the position of West Africa as a prosperous and contented member of the Empire...".

Having begun as a source of news about events and issues in the British colonies of West Africa as well as a link between the colonial power and its administrators in the field, for 80 years West Africa magazine was considered a major source of information about the region.

In the mid-1960s, the magazine was the target of a successful takeover bid by Cecil Harmsworth King's media empire. In 1978, it began to publish poetry and fiction by some of the continent's leading writers. The literary editor from 1978 was Robert Fraser, followed in 1981 by the Booker Prize-winning novelist Ben Okri. In 1993 a commemorative volume was published, entitled West Africa Over 75 Years: Selections from the Raw Material of History, edited by the magazine's then editor-in-chief, Kaye Whiteman, and researched by Kole Omotoso, Ferdinand Dennis and Alfred Zack-Williams.

Ownership of the magazine moved from Britain to the government-owned Daily Times of Nigeria. In 1999, West Africa was bought by the Graphic Corporation of Ghana, under the managing directorship of Kofi Badu.

When West Africa closed in 2004, several key members of its staff founded the weekly magazine Africa Week.

An incomplete run of the magazine is held by the University of London's School of Oriental and African Studies, and in several leading European and American university and college libraries.
