= African Journal of Economic Policy =

- Discipline: Economic policy
- Language: English
- Edited by: Abiodun Bankole

Publication details
- History: 1994–present
- Publisher: African Journals OnLine (Nigeria)
- Frequency: Biannually

Standard abbreviations
- ISO 4: Afr. J. Econ. Policy

Indexing
- ISSN: 1116-4875

Links
- Journal homepage; on-line archive

The African Journal of Economic Policy is an academic journal covering economic policy in Africa. It is an offshoot of the Trade Policy Research and Training Programme in the Economics Department at the University of Ibadan.
