= Moeketsi Letseka =

- Born: 15 October 1957 (age 68); Orange Free State, Union of South Africa
- Occupations: Professor of Philosophy of Education, UNISA; UNESCO Chair on Open Distance Learning
- Known for: Open & distance learning, educational philosophy, student retention
- Awards: Unisa Chancellor’s Award for Excellence in Research (2022)

Academic background
- Education: University of Lesotho; University of South Africa

Moeketsi Letseka is a South African philosopher of education, known for scholarship on ubuntu and open distance education. He is a Professor in the College of Education at the University of South Africa (UNISA) and holder of the UNESCO Chair on Open Distance Learning at UNISA.

== Career ==
Letseka’s research addresses moral philosophy and education in southern Africa, with emphasis on ubuntu/botho and its implications for policy and teaching in open and distance learning. He has delivered invited talks and panels for UNESCO relating to open educational resources and digital learning in Africa.

He is the editor-in-chief of Africa Education Review, a peer-reviewed journal published by Unisa Press in partnership with Taylor & Francis, a role for which he is sometimes credited in independent outlets and author bios.

== Research ==
Letseka’s publications on ubuntu/botho include widely cited work in philosophy of education. His project leadership is documented in independent literature referencing a National Research Foundation of South Africa–funded initiative titled Archaeology of Ubuntu, a multi-country qualitative study conducted 2014–2016. That project is cited across articles discussing ubuntu and indigenous knowledge in southern Africa.

== Honours and recognition ==
- UNESCO Chair on Open Distance Learning (UNISA) (chairholder), 2018–present.
- UNISA Chancellor’s Award for Excellence in Research (institution’s highest research honour), 2022.
- Principal Investigator, NRF-funded “Archaeology of Ubuntu” project (2014–2016), referenced in independent academic publications.

== Selected works ==
- Letseka, M. (2012). “In Defence of Ubuntu.” Studies in Philosophy and Education, 31(1): 47–60. doi:10.1007/s11217-011-9267-2.
- Letseka, M. (2021). “Stimulating ODL research at UNISA: exploring the role and impact of an endowed chair.” Open Learning: The Journal of Open, Distance and e-Learning, 36(3): 249–262. doi:10.1080/02680513.2020.1724780.
