= Acta Theologica =

- Discipline: Theology
- Language: English
- Edited by: Martin Laubscher

Publication details
- History: 1980–present
- Frequency: Biannually
- Open access: Yes

Standard abbreviations
- ISO 4: Acta Theol.

Indexing
- ISSN: 1015-8758 (print); 2309-9089 (web)

Links
- Journal homepage

Acta Theologica is a peer-reviewed open access academic journal published by the University of the Free State. It covers all aspects of Christian theology.

Acta Theologica was established in 1980 and is published twice a year. The editor-in-chief is Martin Laubscher.

Acta Theologica is abstracted and indexed in the ATLA Religion Database and Scopus. It is hosted by African Journals OnLine.
