= Journal of Social Development in Africa =

Journal of Social Development in Africa (JSDA)
- Discipline: African studies
- Language: English
- Edited by: Professor Victor N. Muzvidziwa

Publication details
- History: 1986-present
- Publisher: MSU School of Social Work, Harare (Zimbabwe)
- Frequency: Bi-annual
- Open access: subscription based

Standard abbreviations
- ISO 4: J. Soc. Dev. Afr.

Indexing
- ISSN: 1012-1080 (print); 1726-3700 (web)

Links
- Journal homepage; Free online archive (1986-2003)

The Journal of Social Development in Africa (JSDA) is a bi-annual subscription-based and peer-reviewed academic journal that began in 1986. The journal publishes original research and review articles that advance scholarship on social development issues in Africa - across various disciplines.

The JSDA is published by the Midlands State University, School of Social Work (Zimbabwe)

For further information, read the author guidelines: https://www.ajol.info/index.php/jsda/about/submissions

Unique Focus

The Journal of Social Development in Africa covers a wide range of topics. Recent topics have included articles on social development as it relates to:

• Social Work & Social Welfare

• Social Policy

• Disease Prevention

• Child Protection Policy

• Health behaviours and beliefs

• Human Development & Development Aid in War Situations

• Longevity and mortality

• Gender Equality

• Mental health

• Income diversification

• Pandemics and Development

• Drug and substance use and misuse

• Housing

Interdisciplinary Perspective

In each issue of the Journal of Social Development in Africa, respected scholars present original research findings, views and perspectives from a wide variety of disciplines. This interdisciplinary approach ensures that you are receiving the most balanced and comprehensive scholarship available. Recent articles spanning many fields include:

• Social Work

• Economics

• Psychology

• Public Health

• Social Policy

• Social Services

• Health Services Research

• Development Studies

• Sociology & Community Studies

• Religious Studies

• Community Development

Abstraction and Indexing

The JDSA is indexed and accredited by the following services:

AJOL

Google Scholar

SCOPUS

DHET: South Africa

Managing Editors

Dr. Noel Garikai Muridzo (Director, MSU School of Social Work)

Mr. Wilberforce Kurevakwesu (Lecturer, MSU School of Social Work)

Founding Editor

Professor Rodreck Mupedziswa
