= Sofiane Bouhdiba =

Tunisian demographer

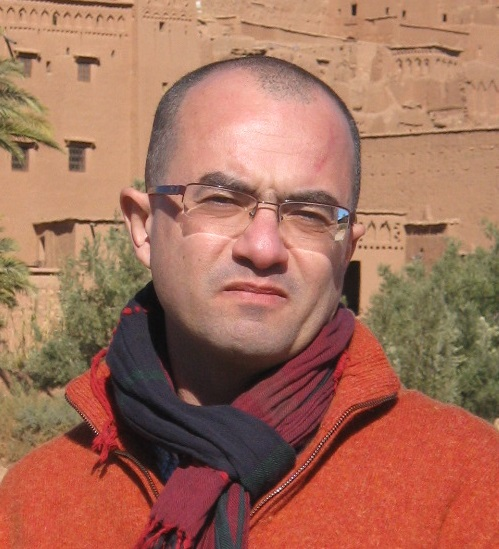
Sofiane Bouhdiba in Ouarzazate, 2013

Sofiane Bouhdiba is a Tunisian demographer, born on 12 April 1968. He is Professor of Demography in the department of Sociology in the University of Tunis. He has taught in many universities in Europe, Africa and the United States, and has participated in a great number of international conferences, with a focus on mortality and morbidity. As an international consultant to the United Nations, he had the opportunity to observe closely the history of the fight against major diseases in the world. He has also participated in numerous scientific and humanitarian missions in sub-Saharan Africa. Professor Sofiane Bouhdiba is well-known for the realism of his recommendations, and has been appointed as an expert in Demography before the Tunisian Parliament (Assemblée des Représentants du Peuple).

Scientific articles written in English:

- « Islam and AIDS prevention in Asia », From negation to negotiations, éd. Pragun Publication, New Delhi, 2008;
- « Trans-national Practices and Sanitary Risks in the Red Sea Region: The Case of the Pilgrimage to Mecca », Society for Arabian Studies Monographs, n°8, 2009;
- « The Pension of the Returning Retired Migrant in the Maghreb: A Development Factor? », A study on the Dynamics of Arab Expatriate Communities: Promoting Positive Contributions to Socioeconomic Development and Political Transitions in their Homelands, éd. Organisation internationale pour les migrations/Ligue des États arabes, Le Caire, 2012;
- « The first Arab revolution? The Jasmine revolution », Global South Magazine, vol. VII, n°3, juillet 2011;
- « Cosmetic Surgery in Arab Muslim Society: History and Representation », actes du colloque Health Related Issues and Islamic Normativity, éd. Université de Hambourg, Hambourg, 2014;
- « Inequities and Democracy: the case of post-revolution Tunisia », Inequality, Democracy and Development under Neoliberalism and Beyond, éd. International Development Economics Associates, New Delhi, 2015;
- « Trade and expansion of Islam in East Africa », GMOIK, n°43, Schweizerische Gesellschaft Mittlerer Osten und Islamische Kulturen, Berne, 2015;

Scientific articles written in French:

- « La mortalité infantile : une fatalité ? », Réalités, n°691, 11 mars 1999;
- « La politique tunisienne de lutte contre la mortalité infantile : état des lieux », Revue tunisienne de sciences sociales, n°119, novembre 1999;
- « Urbanisation et comportement démographique : le cas de Tunis », actes du colloque « Projet urbain », éd. Institut Catalan de la Méditerranée, Barcelone, 2000;
- « Vivre plus, vivre mieux ? Cas de la Tunisie : incidences de l’allongement de l’espérance de vie sur l’état de santé des personnes âgées », actes du colloque « Vivre plus longtemps, avoir moins d’enfants, quelles implications ? » organisé par l'Association internationale des démographes de langue française, éd. PUF, Paris, 2002;
- « Chronos : le point de vue du démographe », Madar, n°15, février 2002;
- « La démographie face aux nouvelles technologies », Les Cahiers du CERES, hors-série n°1, 2003;
- « Mondialisation et comportements démographiques », Revue tunisienne de sciences sociales, n°122, juin 2002;
- « La physionomie de la ville moderne en Tunisie : approche socio-démographique », Les Cahiers de l’ERCILIS, n°3, janvier 2003;
- « Enseignement supérieur, francophonie et développement durable en Afrique du Nord. Le cas de Tunis », actes du colloque « Développement durable. Leçons et perspectives », éd. Agence intergouvernementale de la Francophonie, Ouagadougou, 2004;
- « Vieillissement de la population et emploi en Afrique du Nord à l’horizon 2020 », Reflets de l’économie sociale, vol. III « La question de l’emploi au Maghreb central », éd. Centre de recherches en économie appliquée pour le développement, Alger, 2007;
- « Peur ou pitié ? Peste et exclusion dans le bassin méditerranéen au Moyen Âge », Cahiers du Centre d’histoire médiévale, n°4 « L’exclusion au Moyen Âge », 2007;
- « Le Haut Commissariat des Nations unies pour les réfugiés dans les Balkans », actes du colloque « Migrations, crises et conflits récents dans les Balkans », éd. University of Thessaly Press, 2007;
- « Le système de santé au Maghreb », Governing health systems in Africa, éd. CODESRIA, Dakar, 2008;
- « La lutte contre le sida en Afrique du Nord », Governing health systems in Africa, éd. CODESRIA, Dakar, 2008;
- « L’homophobie dans l’Islam : mythe ou réalité ? », Homosexualités : révélateur social ?, éd. Publications de l'Université de Rouen, Rouen, 2010;
- « Mondialisation et systèmes de santé à double vitesse : le cas de la Tunisie », Santé et mondialisation, éd. Université Jean-Moulin Lyon-III, Lyon, 2010;
- « La représentation du risque routier dans les populations du Sud de la Méditerranée : le cas de la Tunisie urbaine », Les sociétés méditerranéennes face au risque : représentations, éd. Institut français d’archéologie orientale, Le Caire, 2010;
- « La tradition iconographique dans la cartographie arabe », Image et voyage. De la Méditerranée aux Indes, éd. Presses universitaires de Provence, Aix-en-Provence, 2012;
- « Histoire des causes de décès en milieu urbain en Tunisie entre le début et la fin du XX^{e} siècle », African Population Studies (en), vol. XXVI, n°2, novembre 2012;
- « Espace public, espace privé : la dichotomie hôpital public/clinique privée dans le système de santé tunisien », actes du colloque « Les espaces publics au Maghreb », éd. CRASC, Oran, 2013;
- « Dégage ! La clameur publique du printemps tunisien », Clameurs publiques et émotions judiciaires, éd. Presses universitaires de Rennes, Rennes, 2013;
- « L’Empire ottoman face au choléra au Maghreb au XIX^{e} siècle », actes du congrès international The Maghreb and the Western Mediterranean in the Ottoman Era, éd. Research Centre for Islamic History, Art and Culture, Istanbul, 2013;
- « Le pèlerinage à la Mecque, une menace épidémique ? Hajj et choléra au XIX^{e} siècle », actes du congrès international « Politiques du pèlerinage du XVII^{e} siècle à nos jours », éd. Presses universitaires de Rennes, Rennes, 2014
- « Enseignement supérieur, francophonie et développement : le cas de la Tunisie », L'université africaine et sa contribution au développement local : l'exemple du Cameroun, éd. Karthala, Paris, 2014
- « La protection des cités méditerranéennes contre le choléra au XIX^{e} siècle », The Mediterranean cities between myth and reality, éd. Nerbini International, Lugano, 2014
- « Le rituel funéraire en terre d’Islam : tradition et modernité », Le rituel. De l’anthropologie à la clinique, éd. L’Harmattan, Paris, 2015
- « Biocarburant au nord, famine au sud : un paradoxe du développement durable en Afrique ? », Revue Recherches en économie et en management africain, vol. 3, n°3, 2016
- « La vaccination dans les douars du protectorat tunisien (1881-1956) : un malentendu ? », Les malentendus culturels dans le domaine de la santé, éd. Presses universitaires de Nancy, Nancy, 2016
- « Quand la préservation de l’environnement menace la sécurité alimentaire en Afrique de l’Ouest », actes de la conférence Innovation, transformation and sustainable futures in Africa, éd. American Anthropological Association, Arlington, 2017
- « Vieillissement de la population et emploi à l’horizon 2025 : approche comparative entre le Maroc et la Tunisie », Les enjeux du marché du travail au Maroc, éd. OCP Policy Center, Rabat, 2018

Scientific articles written in other languages

- (de) « Die Bedeutung des Konzeptes Baraka in Städtischen Armenmilieu in Tunesien gestern, heute und morgen », Curare, n°29, 2006;
- (es) « Unión del Magreb, un caso de regionalismo Sur-Sur », Revista de Ciencia Política, n°7, janvier-juillet 2009, pp. 113–124;
- (pt) « Sida e estigmatização: O caso dos refugiados em África », Planeta Sida: Diversidade, politicas e respostas sociais, éd. Humus, Lisbonne, 2016.

Books:

- La mortalité urbaine en Tunisie, éd. Centre de publication universitaire, Tunis, 2012;
- Médecin du bled. Sur les pas du médecin de colonie dans le Protectorat tunisien (1881-1956), éd. L’Harmattan, Paris, 2013;
- Gorée, la porte sans retour. La mortalité des captifs à bord des navires négriers, éd. L'Harmattan, Paris, 2014;
- L'ennemi invisible. Histoire de la mortalité sur le champ de bataille, éd. Pierre de Taillac, Paris, 2015;
- Pavillon jaune. Histoire de la quarantaine, de la peste à Ebola, éd. L’Harmattan, Paris, 2016;
- Vieillir en Tunisie, éd. L'Harmattan, Paris, 2017;
- Dans le sillage des médecins de marine, de l’Antiquité à nos jours, éd. L’Harmattan, Paris, 2018;

    Six millions de femmes. Femmes et population en Tunisie, éd. L’Harmattan, Paris, 2018

Six millions de femmes. Femmes et population en Tunisie, éd. L'Harmattan, Paris, 201812 (ISBN 978-2-343-15151-9); Jeunes de Tunisie, éd. L'Harmattan, Paris, 2019 [archive] (ISBN 978-2-140-11544-8); Le côté obscur de la médecine. Médecins mauvais et mauvais médecins, de l'Antiquité à nos jours, éd. L'Harmattan, Paris, 2019; Mort barbare. Histoire des techniques d'exécution abandonnées par la civilisation, éd. Université de Tunis, Tunis, 202013; Histoire sociale du café, éd. SIMPACT, Tunis, 2020; De Carthage à Lampedusa : la migration en Tunisie, éd. L'Harmattan, Paris, 2020. « La traduction des portulans arabes : source de création en cartographie », in Les Cahiers D'ALLHIS n°5 La traduction comme source de création, éd. Les chemins de traverse, Lyon, 2018
