= African Journal of Urology =

- Discipline: Urology
- Language: English, French
- Edited by: I.M. Khalaf

Publication details
- History: 1995–present
- Publisher: Elsevier on behalf of the Pan African Urological Surgeons' Association
- Frequency: Quarterly

Standard abbreviations
- ISO 4: Afr. J. Urol.

Indexing
- ISSN: 1110-5704 (print); 1961-9987 (web)
- OCLC no.: 403623117

Links
- Journal homepage; Online access; Online archives at African Journals OnLine

The African Journal of Urology is a quarterly peer-reviewed medical journal of urology. It is the official journal of the Pan African Urological Surgeons' Association and is published on their behalf by Elsevier. It is also available online from African Journals OnLine. Articles are published in English and French and abstracted and indexed in Scopus and African Index Medicus.
