= Journal of Eastern African Studies =

- Discipline: African studies
- Language: English

Publication details
- History: 2007-present
- Publisher: Routledge on behalf of the British Institute in Eastern Africa
- Frequency: Quarterly
- Impact factor: 0.487 (2014)

Standard abbreviations
- ISO 4: J. East. Afr. Stud.

Indexing
- ISSN: 1753-1055 (print); 1753-1063 (web)
- LCCN: 2007257129
- OCLC no.: 556159859

Links
- Journal homepage; Online access; Online archive

The Journal of Eastern African Studies is a quarterly peer-reviewed academic journal covering research on the Eastern African region. It was established in 2007 and is published by Routledge on behalf of the British Institute in Eastern Africa.

== Abstracting and indexing ==
The journal is abstracted and indexed in African Studies Abstracts Online, CAB Abstracts, Current Contents/Social & Behavioral Sciences, and the Social Sciences Citation Index. According to the Journal Citation Reports, the journal has a 2014 impact factor of 0.487.
