= Institut de la Francophonie pour l'Informatique =

Graduate computer science school in Vietnam

Coordinates: 21.0031°N 105.8477°E

- Type: Graduate school
- Established: 1995
- Location: Hanoi, Vietnam
- Campus: Hanoi University of Technology
- Website: http://www.ifi.vnu.edu.vn/

The Institut de la Francophonie pour l'Informatique (IFI), French for the "Computer Science Institute for the Francophonie", is a graduate school in computer science in Vietnam.

It was created and funded by the Agence universitaire de la Francophonie (AUF) in 1993 following a request from the Vietnamese government for the training of high-level Vietnamese engineers and college professors in computer science. The countries and regions funding the project are Wallonia, Belgium; Québec, Canada; France; French-speaking Switzerland; and Luxembourg. In November 2023, the Institute celebrated its 30th anniversary.

IFI recruits its students in Vietnam and other French-speaking countries, typically requiring a university degree or equivalent following baccalaureate studies. For top students, scholarships have been made available.

Professors at the member universities of the AUF (such as ENST Paris, Université catholique de Louvain, UQAM, etc.) come to IFI to give lectures. All courses are conducted in French.

Usually, the final internship then takes place abroad (Europe or Canada) in industries, universities or research laboratories. Research internships are often used as a bridge toward a PhD. Industrial internships are taken by those who seek the profile of a project leader in software development.

IFI is considered one of the best graduate schools in computer science in Vietnam. About one third of its students continue their PhD in foreign universities; many become professors or founders of software companies in Vietnam.
