= Koedoe =

- Discipline: Conservation biology
- Language: English
- Edited by: Llewellyn C. Foxcroft

Publication details
- History: 1958-present
- Publisher: AOSIS (Pty) Lyd
- Frequency: 1 issue per year
- Open access: Yes
- License: [Creative Commons Attribution 4.0 International (CC BY 4.0)]

Standard abbreviations
- ISO 4: Koedoe

Indexing
- CODEN: KOEDB2
- ISSN: 0075-6458 (print); 2071-0771 (web)
- LCCN: 66050772
- OCLC no.: 229908080

Links
- Journal homepage; Online access; Online archive

Koedoe: African Protected Area Conservation and Science is a peer-reviewed open access scientific journal covering biology, ecology, and biodiversity conservation in Africa. It was established in 1958. Koedoe is Afrikaans for Kudu.

== Abstracting and indexing ==
For full information visit the journal website link http://koedoe.co.za/index.php/koedoe/pages/view/about#7
