= Africa & Asia =

Africa & Asia: Göteborg Working Papers on Asian and African Languages and Literatures
- Discipline: Linguistics, literature
- Language: English

Publication details
- Publisher: University of Gothenburg (Sweden)
- Frequency: Annually

Standard abbreviations
- ISO 4: Afr. Asia

Indexing
- ISSN: 1650-2019
- OCLC no.: 64272834

Links
- Journal homepage

The series Africa & Asia: Göteborg Working Papers on Asian and African Languages and Literatures aims to cover any aspect relevant to the study of Asian and African languages and literatures. The journal appears annually.

The journal was created in 2001.

== See also ==
- Afro-Asia
