= African Symposium =

- Discipline: Education
- Language: English

Publication details
- Publisher: African Educational Research Network

Standard abbreviations
- ISO 4: Afr. Symp.

Indexing
- OCLC no.: 62511400

Links
- Journal homepage

African Symposium is a quarterly on-line academic journal of educational research published by the African Educational Research Network.
