= Development Southern Africa =

- Discipline: development/social sciences/South Africa/Southern Africa
- Language: English

Publication details
- History: 1984–present
- Publisher: Taylor & Francis
- Frequency: 5/year

Standard abbreviations
- ISO 4: Dev. South. Afr.

Indexing
- ISSN: 0376-835X (print); 1470-3637 (web)

Links
- Journal homepage

Development Southern Africa (DSA) is a multi-disciplinary academic journal on development policy and practice in the southern African region. It was first published in the autumn of 1984 by the Development Bank of Southern Africa, and was taken over by Taylor & Francis in 2000.

While articles about agriculture and rural development were dominant in the early years, since 2000, DSA has broadened its focus to cover topics such as "tourism, rural livelihoods, unemployment, small business development, corporate social responsibility, economic infrastructure, land reform, HIV/AIDS, agribusiness and migration". Between 2000 and 2010, it was the leading academic journal publishing research on tourism in the region, with 45 articles published on the subject.
