= African Journal of Biomedical Research =

- Discipline: Medicine
- Language: English

Publication details
- History: 1998-present
- Publisher: Ibadan Biomedical Communications Group (Nigeria)
- Frequency: Triannually

Standard abbreviations
- ISO 4: Afr. J. Biomed. Res.

Indexing
- ISSN: 1119-5096

Links
- Journal homepage; Online access

The African Journal of Biomedical Research covers all fields within the biomedical sciences including the allied health fields.
