= African Journal of Infectious Diseases =

Medical journal

- Discipline: Infectious diseases
- Language: English

Publication details
- History: 2007-present
- Publisher: African Ethnomedicines Network
- Frequency: Biannually

Standard abbreviations
- ISO 4: Afr. J. Infect. Dis.

Indexing
- ISSN: 2006-0165 (print); 2505-0419 (web)

Links
- Journal homepage

The African Journal of Infectious Diseases covers research on the pathogenesis, diagnosis, epidemiology, and treatment of infectious diseases, the impact of infectious agents on the environment, and related disciplines. It is published by the African Ethnomedicines Network.

== Abstracting and indexing ==
The journal is abstracted and indexed in:

- CAB Direct database
- Embase
- Scopus
- Veterinary Science Database
