= African Safety Promotion =

- Discipline: Occupational safety and health
- Language: English

Publication details
- History: 2002–present
- Publisher: University of South Africa (South Africa)
- Frequency: Biannual
- Open access: Yes

Standard abbreviations
- ISO 4: Afr. Saf. Promot.

Indexing
- ISSN: 1728-774X
- OCLC no.: 609694995

Links
- Journal homepage

African Safety Promotion: A Journal of Injury and Violence Prevention is a forum for discussion and debate among scholars, policy-makers and practitioners active in the field of injury prevention and safety promotion.
