= Africa Update =

- Discipline: African studies
- Language: English

Publication details
- History: 1993–present
- Publisher: Central Connecticut State University, African Studies Program (United States)

Standard abbreviations
- ISO 4: Afr. Update

Indexing
- ISSN: 1526-7822 (print); 1526-8047 (web)

Links
- Journal homepage

Africa Update is the quarterly newsletter of the African Studies Program at Central Connecticut State University.
