= African Markets Overview =

African Magazine

- Categories: Finance, economics
- Frequency: Monthly
- Publisher: Africa Centre for Investment Analysis
- First issue: April 2000
- Final issue: August 2008
- Country: South Africa
- Language: English
- Website: http://journals.sabinet.co.za/ej/ejour_market.html
- ISSN: 1606-8793
- OCLC: 85447813

African Markets Overview was a magazine that reported on the monthly performance of stock markets in the greater African region. It discontinued in August 2008.
