= Aupa Moeketsi =

South African footballer

Personal information
- Full name: Aupa Jino Moeketsi
- Date of birth: 7 April 1994 (age 32)
- Place of birth: Sharpeville, South Africa
- Position: Defender

Team information
- Current team: University of Pretoria

Youth career
- Rosina Sedibane Modiba Sport School
- 2009–2013: SuperSport United

Senior career*
Years	Team	Apps	(Gls)
2013–2016	SuperSport United	14	(0)
2015	→ Vasco da Gama (loan)	1	(0)
2016–2015	Ubuntu Cape Town	18	(0)
2020–2021	Pretoria Callies	27	(1)
2022–	University of Pretoria	2	(0)

International career^{‡}
2011	South African U-20		
- * Club domestic league appearances and goals as of 18 November 2013 ‡ National team caps and goals as of 18 November 2013

Aupa Jino Moeketsi (born 7 April 1994) is a South African soccer player who plays for University of Pretoria as a defender.

== Club career ==
Moeketsi joined the SuperSport United academy from Rosina Sedibane Modiba Sport School in 2009. He was promoted to the first-team squad in January 2013 and made his debut against Platinum Stars on 13 May 2013.

== International career ==
Moeketsi has represented the South African under-20 team at the 2011 COSAFA U-20 Challenge Cup and the 2012 Cape Town International Challenge.
