= Abasebenzi =

- Categories: African studies
- Publisher: University of Cape Town, Wages Commission, Student's Representative Council
- Founded: 1973
- Final issue: 1976
- Country: South Africa
- Based in: Cape Town
- Language: English, Zulu, Xhosa editions
- Website: Online access
- OCLC: 52487475

Abasebenzi was published from 1973 to 1976 by the Wages Commission, Student's Representative Council at the University of Cape Town and aimed to create awareness by informing workers in the Western Cape (mainly Cape Town) of the importance of worker unity, organisation and representation in order to protect their interests, better their wages and working conditions and end worker exploitation. Information about collective bargaining, formation of liaison committees, works committees and trade unions was made available in order to empower workers in their struggle. Abasebenzi also endeavoured to assist individual workers with particular problems and articles included information about overtime, unemployment insurance and workmen's compensation. In 1976, five issues and all future issues were banned and publication was forced to cease.
