= Africa Confidential =

African newsletter in London

- Africa Confidential ©️
- Editor: Patrick Smith (1991- )
- Former editors: Stephen Ellis (1986–1991) Charles Meynell (1981–1986) Xan Smiley (1977–1981) Godfrey Morrison (1968–1977) Alan Rake (1968) Richard Kershaw (1964–1968) Charles Janson (1960–1964)
- Categories: Newsletter
- Frequency: Fortnightly
- Publisher: Asempa Limited
- Founder: Miramoor Publications Ltd
- Founded: 1960; 66 years ago
- Company: Asempa Limited
- Country: United Kingdom
- Based in: London, England
- Language: English
- Website: www.africa-confidential.com
- ISSN: 0044-6483
- OCLC: 819004997

Africa Confidential is a fortnightly newsletter covering politics and economics in Africa. It was established in 1960 and is owned by the British company Asempa Limited. Founded by a group of six individuals under the banner of Miramoor Publications, Africa Confidential was originally printed on blue airmail paper and was thus nicknamed "The Blue Sheet". It is available by subscription only.

Africa Confidential focuses on issues that affect the continent, analyses political complexities and produces investigations into corruption and political intrigue. Its coverage includes Zimbabwe, Kenya, Nigeria and Sudan. Patrick Smith has edited Africa Confidential since 1991. Former editors include Richard Kershaw (1964–1968) and Stephen Ellis (1986–1991).

In 2007, Africa Confidential launched a monthly newsletter called Africa-Asia Confidential.
