= GIGA Focus Afrika =

- Categories: African politics
- Publisher: Deutsches Übersee-Institut Hamburg
- First issue: February 2002
- Country: Germany
- Website: Magazine homepage
- ISSN: 1619-3156
- OCLC: 85718710

GIGA Focus Afrika is a magazine published by the German Institute of Global and Area Studies. Its original title was Afrika im Blickpunkt.
