= Comparative and International Law Journal of Southern Africa =

- Discipline: Law
- Language: English

Publication details
- History: 1968-present
- Publisher: Institute of Foreign and Comparative Law, University of South Africa (South Africa)
- Frequency: Triannually

Standard abbreviations
- ISO 4: Comp. Int. Law J. South. Afr.

Indexing
- ISSN: 0010-4051

Links
- Journal homepage

The Comparative and International Law Journal of Southern Africa is a peer-reviewed law journal published by the Institute of Foreign and Comparative Law, University of South Africa.
