= Water SA =

- Discipline: hydrology
- Language: English

Publication details
- History: 1975 to present
- Publisher: Water Resources Commission (WRC) (South Africa)

Standard abbreviations
- ISO 4: Water SA

Indexing
- ISSN: 0378-4738

Links
- Journal homepage

Water SA publishes refereed, original work in all branches of water science, technology and engineering. This includes water resources development; the hydrological cycle; surface hydrology; geohydrology and hydrometeorology; limnology; salinisation; treatment and management of municipal and industrial water and wastewater; treatment and disposal of sewage sludge; environmental pollution control; water quality and treatment; aquaculture in terms of its impact on the water resource; agricultural water science; etc.
