= African Journal of Range & Forage Science =

- Discipline: Agriculture, forestry
- Language: English
- Edited by: Susanne Vetter

Publication details
- Former name(s): Proceedings of the Grassland Society of Southern Africa, Journal of the Grassland Society of Southern Africa
- History: 1966-present
- Publisher: Taylor & Francis and the National Inquiry Services Centre on behalf of the Grassland Society of Southern Africa
- Frequency: Quarterly
- Impact factor: 0.961 (2016)

Standard abbreviations
- ISO 4: Afr. J. Range Forage Sci.

Indexing
- ISSN: 1022-0119 (print); 1727-9380 (web)
- LCCN: 2017205848
- OCLC no.: 614978507

Links
- Journal homepage; Online access; Online archive

The African Journal of Range & Forage Science is a quarterly peer-reviewed scientific journal that covers the management and sustainable utilisation of natural and agricultural resources. It is published by Taylor & Francis and the National Inquiry Services Centre on behalf of the Grassland Society of Southern Africa. The editor-in-chief is James Bennett (Coventry University).

== Abstracting and indexing ==
The journal is abstracted and indexed in the Science Citation Index Expanded, The Zoological Record, and BIOSIS Previews. According to the Journal Citation Reports, the journal has a 2016 impact factor of 0.961.
