= African Finance Journal =

Academic journal on finance, accounting and economics

- Discipline: Finance, accounting, economics
- Language: English
- Edited by: Prof. Nicholas Biekpe (Graduate School of Business, University of Cape Town & Africagrowth Institute)

Publication details
- History: 1999-present
- Publisher: Africagrowth Institute (South Africa)
- Frequency: Biannually

Standard abbreviations
- ISO 4: Afr. Finance J.

Indexing
- ISSN: 1605-9786

Links
- Journal homepage

The African Finance Journal is a peer-reviewed academic journal covering finance, accounting, and economics in an African context. The African Finance Journal (AFJ) is published twice a year and edited at Africagrowth Institute.

The journal is jointly published by the institute, University of Cape Town and the African Finance Association. AFJ publishes significant new research in finance, accounting and economics relevant to Africa and strives to establish a balance between theoretical and empirical studies.

The journal is accredited by the South African National Department of Education for the purpose of research subsidy.

== Abstract, indexing and ranking ==
- EconLit
- Scopus
- RePec
- IBSS
- Sabinet
- Chartered Association of Business Schools (CABS)
