= African Skies (journal) =

- Discipline: Space science
- Language: English, French
- Edited by: P. Martinez

Publication details
- History: 1997-present
- Publisher: Working Group on Space Sciences in Africa
- Frequency: Annually
- Open access: Yes

Standard abbreviations
- ISO 4: Afr. Ski.

Indexing
- ISSN: 1027-8389
- OCLC no.: 50012365

Links
- Journal homepage

African Skies/Cieux Africains is published by the Working Group on Space Sciences in Africa. It is distributed to individuals and institutes involved in research and education in the space sciences in Africa. The editor-in-chief is P. Martinez (South African Astronomical Observatory).
