= African Journal of AIDS Research =

- Discipline: AIDS
- Language: English
- Edited by: Alan Whiteside

Publication details
- History: 2002–present
- Publisher: Centre for AIDS Development, Research and Evaluation (South Africa)
- Frequency: Quarterly
- Impact factor: 0.861 (2016)

Standard abbreviations
- ISO 4: Afr. J. AIDS Res.

Indexing
- ISSN: 1608-5906 (print); 1727-9445 (web)
- LCCN: 2003243352
- OCLC no.: 50398004

Links
- Journal homepage; Online access at AJOL

The African Journal of AIDS Research is a peer-reviewed medical journal published in 2002 by the National Inquiry Services Centre (Grahamstown, South Africa) on topics related to understanding the social dimensions to AIDS in Africa. Launched to address the lack of an African-managed journal focussed on social-science research on HIV/AIDS in Africa, it is now co-published and distributed by Taylor and Francis.
