= African Development Perspectives Yearbook =

- Discipline: African studies
- Language: English
- Edited by: Karl Wohlmuth

Publication details
- History: 1989-present
- Publisher: Lit Verlag Berlin and Transaction Publishers, Rutgers University
- Frequency: Annually

Standard abbreviations
- ISO 4: Afr. Dev. Perspect. Yearb.

Links
- Journal homepage

The African Development Perspectives Yearbook is an annual academic journal covering socio-economic trends in Africa. According to its publication program, the yearbook aims to analyse African economic policies on various levels: from local to national, regional, and international level.
