= Africa-Asia Confidential =

Logo

Africa-Asia Confidential was first published in November 2007 by the same group that owns Africa Confidential, Asempa Limited of Cambridge. The newsletter was founded in response to the growing political and economic relations between Africa and Asia, and by the need to understand the implications for Africa. Available by subscription only, it is published monthly and edited by African specialist Patrick Smith, who has edited Africa Confidential since 1991. The headquarters of Africa-Asia Confidential is in London.

Africa-Asia Confidential focuses on issues that affect the continent, analyses political complexities and reports on areas and topics that receive little coverage in the mainstream press. With its investigations into corruption and political intrigue, Africa-Asia Confidential is read monthly by people in a wide range of institutions and by individuals around the world. The newsletter gives insight into the importance of the increasing connections of China, India, Japan and South Korea with Africa and the facts about commercial, political and diplomatic relations.
