= African and Black Diaspora =

- Discipline: African studies, Black studies, African diaspora
- Language: English

Publication details
- History: 2008–present
- Publisher: Routledge
- Frequency: Biannually

Standard abbreviations
- ISO 4: Afr. Black Diaspora

Indexing
- ISSN: 1752-8631 (print); 1752-864X (web)
- LCCN: 2007213166
- OCLC no.: 154200895

Links
- Journal homepage; Online access; Online archive

African and Black Diaspora is a biannual peer-reviewed academic journal covering African and Black studies, as well as research on the African diaspora. It was established in 2008 and is published by Routledge. The editors-in-chief are Fassil Demissie (DePaul University) and Sandra Jackson (DePaul University).

The first academic journal to address directly the needs of scholars working in the field of African Diaspora studies, it publishes research articles, commentaries and book reviews.

== Abstracting and indexing ==
The journal is abstracted and indexed in Scopus.

== Special issues ==
The journal has produced special issues, sometimes guest-edited, that have subsequently been published as books by Routledge.
