= Africa Week =

UK weekly magazine on African affairs

- Categories: Africa
- Frequency: Weekly
- Publisher: Trans Africa Publishing
- Founded: 2004
- Country: United Kingdom
- Based in: London
- Website: web.archive.org/web/*/http://www.africaweekmagazine.com
- ISSN: 1744-0734

Africa Week was a weekly magazine covering African affairs.

== History and profile ==
Africa Week was established by TransAfrica Publishing Ltd in May 2004.

The magazine was the successor to West Africa, another weekly magazine. Africa Week was published by TransAfrica Publishing Ltd and was based in London, UK. Frank Afful was the founding managing editor and Desmond Davies the founding editor of the magazine. The now defunct magazine covered news on the politics, social issues and economics of Africa.
