= African Newsletter on Occupational Health and Safety =

- Discipline: Occupational health and safety
- Language: English

Publication details
- History: 1991-present
- Publisher: Finnish Institute of Occupational Health (Finland)
- Frequency: Triannual

Standard abbreviations
- ISO 4: Afr. Newsl. Occup. Health Saf.

Indexing
- ISSN: 0788-4877 (print); 1239-4386 (web)
- OCLC no.: 67049008

Links
- Journal homepage

The African Newsletter on Occupational Health and Safety has been published since 1991 by the Finnish Institute of Occupational Health and is financially supported by the World Health Organization and the International Labour Organization.
