= Journal of African Business =

Academic journal

- Discipline: Business studies
- Language: English
- Edited by: Moses Acquaah

Publication details
- History: 2000–present
- Publisher: Routledge on behalf of the International Academy of African Business and Development
- Frequency: Quarterly

Standard abbreviations
- ISO 4: J. Afr. Bus.

Indexing
- ISSN: 1522-8916 (print); 1522-9076 (web)
- LCCN: sn98005055
- OCLC no.: 970436530

Links
- Journal homepage; Online access; Online archive

The Journal of African Business is a quarterly peer-reviewed academic journal covering all aspects of business studies related to Africa. It was established in 2000 and is the official journal of the International Academy of African Business and Development. Since 2014, the academy publishes it in association with Routledge. The editor-in-chief is Moses Acquaah (University of North Carolina at Greensboro).

== Abstracting and indexing ==
The journal is abstracted and indexed in:

- EBSCO databases
- EconLit
- Emerging Sources Citation Index
- GEOBASE
- International Bibliography of Periodical Literature
- International Bibliography of the Social Sciences
- ProQuest databases
- Scopus

== Editors-in-chief ==
The following persons are or have been editor-in-chief:

- Moses Acquaah (University of North Carolina at Greensboro)
- Samuel Bonsu (Ghana Institute of Management and Public Administration)
- Isaac Otchere (Carleton University)
- Simon P. Sigué (Athabasca University)
- Kofi Q. Dadzie (Georgia State University)
- Sam C. Okoroafo (University of Toledo)
