= African Crop Science Journal =

- Discipline: Africa, agriculture
- Language: English
- Edited by: J. S. Tenywa

Publication details
- History: 1993–present
- Publisher: African Crop Science Society (Uganda)
- Frequency: Quarterly

Standard abbreviations
- ISO 4: Afr. Crop Sci. J.

Indexing
- ISSN: 1021-9730 (print); 2072-6589 (web)
- OCLC no.: 60630052

Links
- Journal homepage; Online access

The African Crop Science Journal, a quarterly publication, publishes original research papers dealing with all aspects of crop agronomy, production, genetics and breeding, germplasm, crop protection, post harvest systems and utilisation, agro-forestry, crop-animal interactions, information science, environmental science and soil science. It also publishes authoritative reviews on crop science and environmental issues by invitation. The Journal also accepts "short communications" dealing with original results not warranting publication as full papers, book reviews and has an advertisement section. To encourage dialogue on topical issues, the Journal has a "Forum" section. It is bilingual, publishing in either English or French.

== African Crop Science Society ==
This journal is a part of African Crop Science Society (ACSS), which is for investigators, producers, business people and technicians around the world. The ACSS was established in 1993 with overall goal of promoting crop production and food security in the continent of Africa.

The general objectives embedded in the society's constitution are to foster and promote the study of crops in all its facets, this it shall do by creating opportunities for the free exchange of ideas on crop science and related fields in Africa; fostering liaison between the Society and other bodies with common or similar interests both in Africa and abroad; obtaining and disseminating knowledge, information and ideas pertaining to crops by means of deliberations and publications; promoting the work and interests of members of the profession and promoting contact among the national and regional crop science societies in Africa; encouraging scientific training in crop science; promoting a general awareness of the environment and utilizing, protecting and conserving the environment; and fulfilling any other function that may be in the interests of crop science.

The Society membership consists of fellow members, honorary members, ordinary members, associate members, student members and institutional members. All registered members of the Society shall receive all notices and free publications of the Society, and may attend general meetings and congresses of the Society. The affairs of the Society are managed by a Council, consisting of: the immediate past-president of the Society; and the following elected members: a president, a vice-president, five regional members, woman representative; and three ordinary council members. English and French are the recognized languages of the Society.

Generally, the activities of the Society include the convening of congresses, symposia, workshops and training courses; publication of the African Crop Science Journal; publication of regular Newsletters; and organizing general or special general meetings of the Society.

The society meets once every two years, 1993 in Kampala, Uganda; in 1995 Blantyre, Malawi; in 1997 Pretoria, South Africa; in 1999 Casablanca, Morocco, in 2001 Lagos, Nigeria; in 2003 Nairobi, Kenya; in 2005 Entebbe, Uganda, in 2007 El-Minia, Egypt, in 2009 Cape Town, South Africa, and will meet in 2011 in Maputo, Mozambique.

The ACSS Conference series is held every odd year in one of the African countries. ACSS conferences are truly international and attract a lot of participation ranging from 400 to 600 participants. The goal of the conferences are to promote the active exchange of crop sciences information, innovation, and new ideas and usually attended by experts of the highest caliber, distinguished keynote speakers, ministers of irrigation, higher education, agriculture, environment and eminent scientists from Africa and the four corners of the globe.. At the 8th ACSS conference held in El-Minia, Egypt, 27–31 October 2007, more than 400 of high quality papers and 10 plenary, as well as, 12 keynote lectures, in different fields, have been presented orally or poster. All these contributions were published in ACSS Conference Proceedings Volume 8 with four parts and 2200 pages as well as CDs.
