= Africana Libraries Newsletter =

African Studies Association newsletter

- Categories: Africa, librarianship, newsletters
- Publisher: Bloomington, Ind.: Indiana University
- Country: United States
- Website: Newsletter archive
- ISSN: 0148-7868
- OCLC: 66450310

The Africana Libraries Newsletter is published in October and March of each year. The newsletter is produced to support the work of the Africana Librarians Council (ALC) of the African Studies Association. Contents include abbreviated reports on meetings of ALC and the Cooperative Africana Microform Project (CAMP) and other relevant groups. It also reports other items of interest to Africana librarians and those concerned about information resources about or in Africa. Contents include short book reviews.

Since 1999, The Africana Libraries Newsletter (ALN) is published by The Indiana University Bloomington. Before that, from 1997 to 1999 Africana Libraries Newsletter (ALN) was published by The Michigan State University Libraries and the African Studies Center to support the work of the Africana Librarians Council of the African Studies Association. It includes reports on meetings and other items of interest to Africana librarians and those interested in information about or from Africa.
