= African Journal of Aquatic Science =

- Discipline: Aquatic science
- Language: English
- Edited by: Nick Rivers-Moore and Eliot Taylor

Publication details
- Former names: Journal of the Limnological Society of Southern Africa, Southern African Journal of Aquatic Sciences
- History: 1975-present
- Publisher: Taylor & Francis on behalf of the Southern African Society of Aquatic Scientists
- Frequency: Quarterly
- Impact factor: 1.577 (2021)

Standard abbreviations
- ISO 4: Afr. J. Aquat. Sci.

Indexing
- CODEN: AJASBI
- ISSN: 1608-5914 (print); 1727-9364 (web)
- LCCN: 2004203445
- OCLC no.: 1030857202

Links
- Journal homepage; Online access; Online archive; Journal page at African Journals OnLine

The African Journal of Aquatic Science is a peer-reviewed scientific journal covering research in the aquatic sciences in Africa. It was established in 1975 as Journal of the Limnological Society of Southern Africa and renamed in 1989 as the Southern African Journal of Aquatic Sciences, before obtaining its current name in 2000. It is published by Taylor & Francis on behalf of the Southern African Society of Aquatic Scientists.

== Abstracting and indexing ==
The journal is abstracted and indexed in:

- BIOSIS Previews
- Science Citation Index Expanded
- Scopus
- The Zoological Record

According to the Journal Citation Reports, the journal has a 2021 impact factor of 1.577.
