= African and Asian Studies =

- Discipline: Area studies
- Language: English
- Edited by: Tukumbi Lumumba-Kasongo

Publication details
- History: 2002-present
- Publisher: Brill Publishers
- Frequency: Quarterly
- Impact factor: 0.250 (2021)

Standard abbreviations
- ISO 4: Afr. Asian Stud.

Indexing
- ISSN: 1569-2094 (print); 1569-2108 (web)
- OCLC no.: 50062797

Links
- Journal homepage

African and Asian Studies is a peer-reviewed academic journal covering research on Africa and Asia. It covers aspects of anthropology, sociology, history, political science and related social sciences about African and Asian societies and cultures and their relationships. From 1966 to 2001 this journal was published under the name of Journal of African and Asian Studies.

According to the Journal Citation Reports, the journal has a 2021 impact factor of 0.250. The editor-in-chief is Tukumbi Lumumba-Kasongo (Wells College).

== Abstracting and indexing ==
The journal is abstracted and indexed in:

- Geobase
- Scopus
- MLA - Modern Language Association Database
- Worldwide Political Science Abstracts
- Historical Abstracts
- SCImago
