= African Journal of Marine Science =

Peer-reviewed scientific journal covering all disciplines of marine science

- Discipline: Marine sciences
- Language: English
- Edited by: Sheldon Dudley

Publication details
- Former name(s): South African Journal of Marine Science
- History: 1983–present
- Publisher: Taylor & Francis on behalf of the National Inquiry Services Centre
- Frequency: Quarterly
- Impact factor: 1.183 (2020)

Standard abbreviations
- ISO 4: Afr. J. Mar. Sci.

Indexing
- ISSN: 1814-232X (print); 1814-2338 (web)
- LCCN: 2011250748
- OCLC no.: 834309269

Links
- Journal homepage; Online access; Online archive

The African Journal of Marine Science is a peer-reviewed scientific journal covering all disciplines of marine science. It was established in 1983 as the South African Journal of Marine Science and obtained its current name in 2003. It is published by Taylor & Francis on behalf of the National Inquiry Services Centre (South Africa). The editor-in-chief is Sheldon Dudley (Department of Agriculture, Forestry and Fisheries).

== Abstracting and indexing ==
The journal is abstracted and indexed in:

- Biological Abstracts
- BIOSIS Previews
- Current Contents/Agriculture, Biology & Environmental Sciences
- Science Citation Index Expanded
- Scopus
- The Zoological Record

According to the Journal Citation Reports, the journal has a 2020 impact factor of 1.183.
