= Journal on African Philosophy =

- Discipline: Africa, philosophy
- Language: English

Publication details
- History: 2002–present
- Publisher: International Society for African Philosophy and Studies (ISAPS) (United States)

Standard abbreviations
- ISO 4: J. Afr. Philos.

Indexing
- ISSN: 1533-1067
- OCLC no.: 45651192

Links
- Journal homepage

The Journal on African Philosophy is an electronic journal sponsored by the International Society for African Philosophy and Studies and published by Africa Resource Center.
