= Africa Education Review =

- Discipline: Africa
- Language: English

Publication details
- Former name(s): Educare
- History: 1972–present
- Publisher: Pretoria : Unisa (South Africa)

Standard abbreviations
- ISO 4: Afr. Educ. Rev.

Indexing
- ISSN: 1814-6627 (print); 1753-5921 (web)
- OCLC no.: 243599688

Africa Education Review is a peer-reviewed academic journal covering current educational issues. It has been in existence since 1972 under the name Educare.

== Indexing and abstracting ==
The journal is abstracted and indexed in the following bibliographic databases:

- Emerging Sources Citation Index
- Scopus
- International Bibliography of the Social Sciences
- EBSCO Education Source
- Educational Research Abstracts
- ERIC
