= African Population Studies =

- Discipline: Population studies
- Language: English, French
- Edited by: Clifford Odimegwu

Publication details
- History: 1986–present
- Publisher: Union for African Population Studies
- Frequency: Biannually
- Open access: Yes

Standard abbreviations
- ISO 4: Afr. Popul. Stud.

Indexing
- ISSN: 0850-5780 (print); 2308-7854 (web)
- OCLC no.: 52333319

Links
- Journal homepage; Online access; Online archive

Etude de la Population Africaine/African Population Studies is a peer-reviewed academic journal covering original research on African populations, development, and related fields. It was established in 1986 and is published by the Union for African Population Studies. The editor-in-chief is Clifford Odimegwu (University of the Witwatersrand).
