= African Study Monographs =

- Discipline: African studies
- Language: English

Publication details
- History: 1981–present
- Publisher: The Center for African Area Studies, Kyoto University (Japan)
- Frequency: Yearly
- Open access: Yes

Standard abbreviations
- ISO 4: Afr. Study Monogr.

Indexing
- ISSN: 0285-1601 (print); 2435-807X (web)
- OCLC no.: 66902360

Links
- Official Website

African Study Monographs (ASM) is a peer-reviewed open access academic journal that covers African studies. Since the first issue published in 1981, African Study Monographs has been widely circulated and read by researchers as a leading journal on African studies. The journal publishes regular issues and special issues (Supplementary Issues). In principle, all recent papers are open access, and accepted papers are immediately published on the ASM website. Since 2021, the journal is published yearly as a soft cover book and is distributed to African countries and more than 200 African research institutes around the world. In particular, it has provided a venue for young researchers to publish their research results.
