= Slim Khalbous =

Tunisian politician

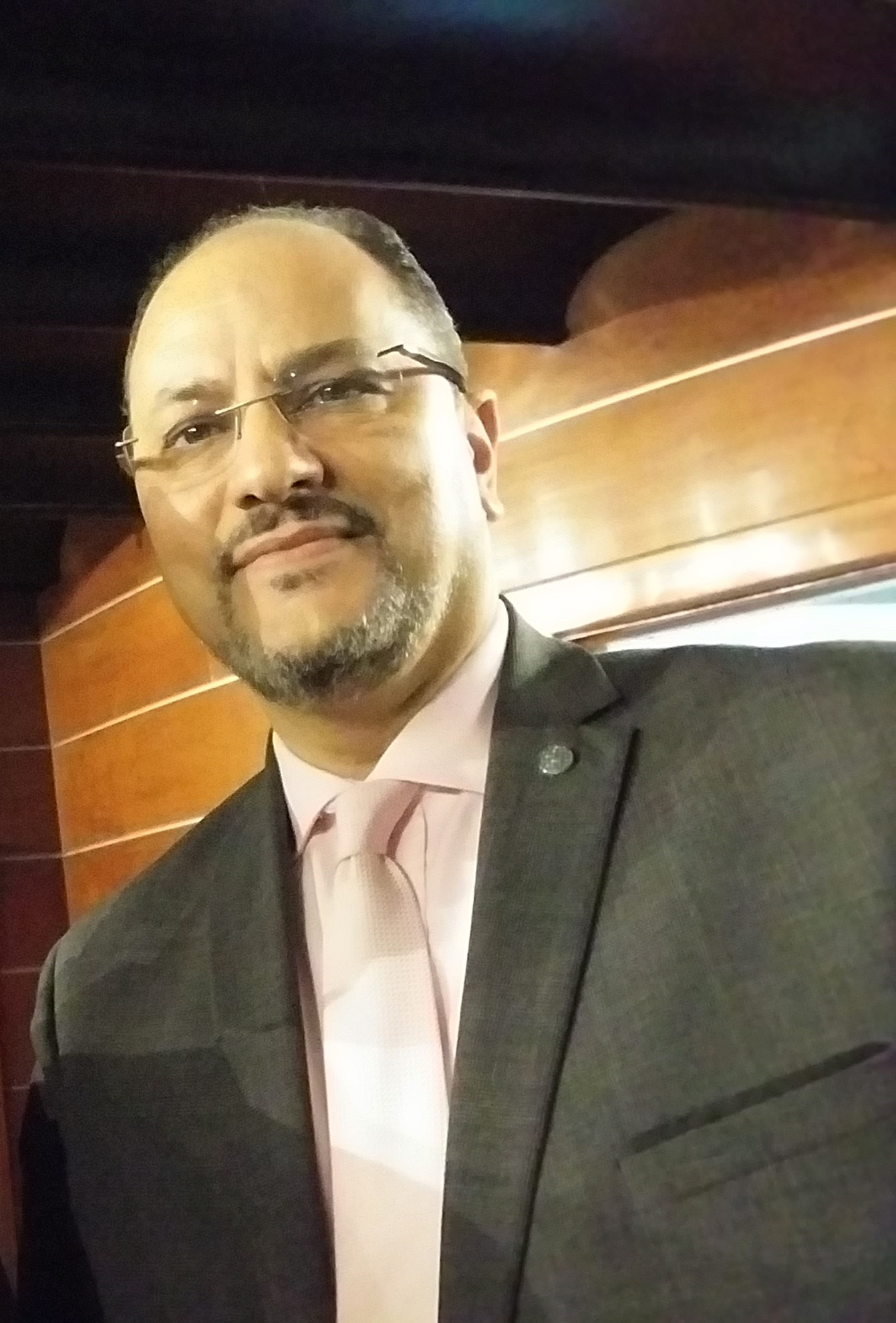
Slim Khalbous, Rector of the University Agency of La Francophonie

Slim Khalbous is a Tunisian politician. He serves as the Tunisian Minister of Higher Education and, since 1 May 2017, National Education.

....
