= African Studies Abstracts Online =

- Discipline: African studies
- Language: Dutch, English, French, German

Publication details
- History: 1968–2017
- Publisher: Afrika-Studiecentrum Leiden (Netherlands)
- Frequency: Quarterly
- Open access: Yes

Standard abbreviations
- ISO 4: Afr. Stud. Abstr. Online

Indexing
- ISSN: 1570-937X
- LCCN: 95652166
- OCLC no.: 1010589479

Links
- Journal homepage

African Studies Abstracts Online (ASAO) was a quarterly abstracting service covering academic journal articles and edited works on Africa in the field of the social sciences and the humanities. It was published by the Afrika-Studiecentrum Leiden. The journal was established in 1968 as Documentatieblad and renamed African Studies Abstracts in 1994, before obtaining its current name in 2002 when print was abandoned and with volume numbering re-starting at 1. ASAO no. 60 (2017) was the last issue.
