= South African Journal of Science =

- Discipline: Multidisciplinary
- Language: English
- Edited by: Leslie Swartz

Publication details
- History: 1903-present
- Publisher: Academy of Science of South Africa (South Africa)
- Frequency: Bimonthly
- Open access: Yes
- License: CC BY 4.0
- Impact factor: 2.134 (2021)

Standard abbreviations
- ISO 4: S. Afr. J. Sci.

Indexing
- CODEN: SAJSAR
- ISSN: 0038-2353 (print); 1996-7489 (web)
- OCLC no.: 3639666

Links
- Journal homepage; Online access; Online archive

The South African Journal of Science is an open access, multidisciplinary academic journal published bimonthly by the Academy of Science of South Africa. The journal has a 2021 impact factor of 2.134.

== History ==
The journal was established in 1903 as the Proceedings of the Annual Meetings of the South African Association for the Advancement of Science. The annual volume became a monthly publication in August 1947.

== Abstracting and indexing ==
The journal is abstracted and indexed in:

- Scopus
- Science Citation Index Expanded
- Current Contents/Agriculture, Biology & Environmental Sciences
- Current Contents/Life Sciences
- The Zoological Record
- BIOSIS Previews
