= South African Geographical Journal =

- Discipline: Geography
- Language: English
- Edited by: Prof David Hedding (UNISA), Prof Ashley Gunter (UNISA)

Publication details
- History: 1917-present
- Publisher: Taylor & Francis (United Kingdom)
- Frequency: Biannually
- Impact factor: 1.154 (2019)

Standard abbreviations
- ISO 4: S. Afr. Geogr. J.

Indexing
- ISSN: 0373-6245 (print); 2151-2418 (web)

Links
- Journal homepage; Journal page at society's website

The South African Geographical Journal is the official journal of the Society of South African Geographers. The journal was established in 1917.

The South African Geographical Journal was founded in 1917 and is the flagship journal of the Society of South African Geographers. The journal aims at using southern Africa as a region from, and through, which to communicate geographic knowledge and to engage with issues and themes relevant to the discipline. The journal is a forum for papers of a high academic quality and welcomes papers dealing with philosophical and methodological issues and topics of an international scope that are significant for the region and the African continent, including:

Climate change Environmental studies Development Governance and policy Physical and urban Geography Human Geography Sustainability Tourism GIS and remote sensing The journal welcomes manuscripts in the following formats:

Research papers Review articles on current debates and issues Book reviews Peer Review Statement All submitted manuscripts are subject to initial appraisal by the Editors, and if found suitable for further consideration, to peer review by independent, anonymous expert referees and peer review is double blind.
