= African Journals OnLine =

South African non-profit organization

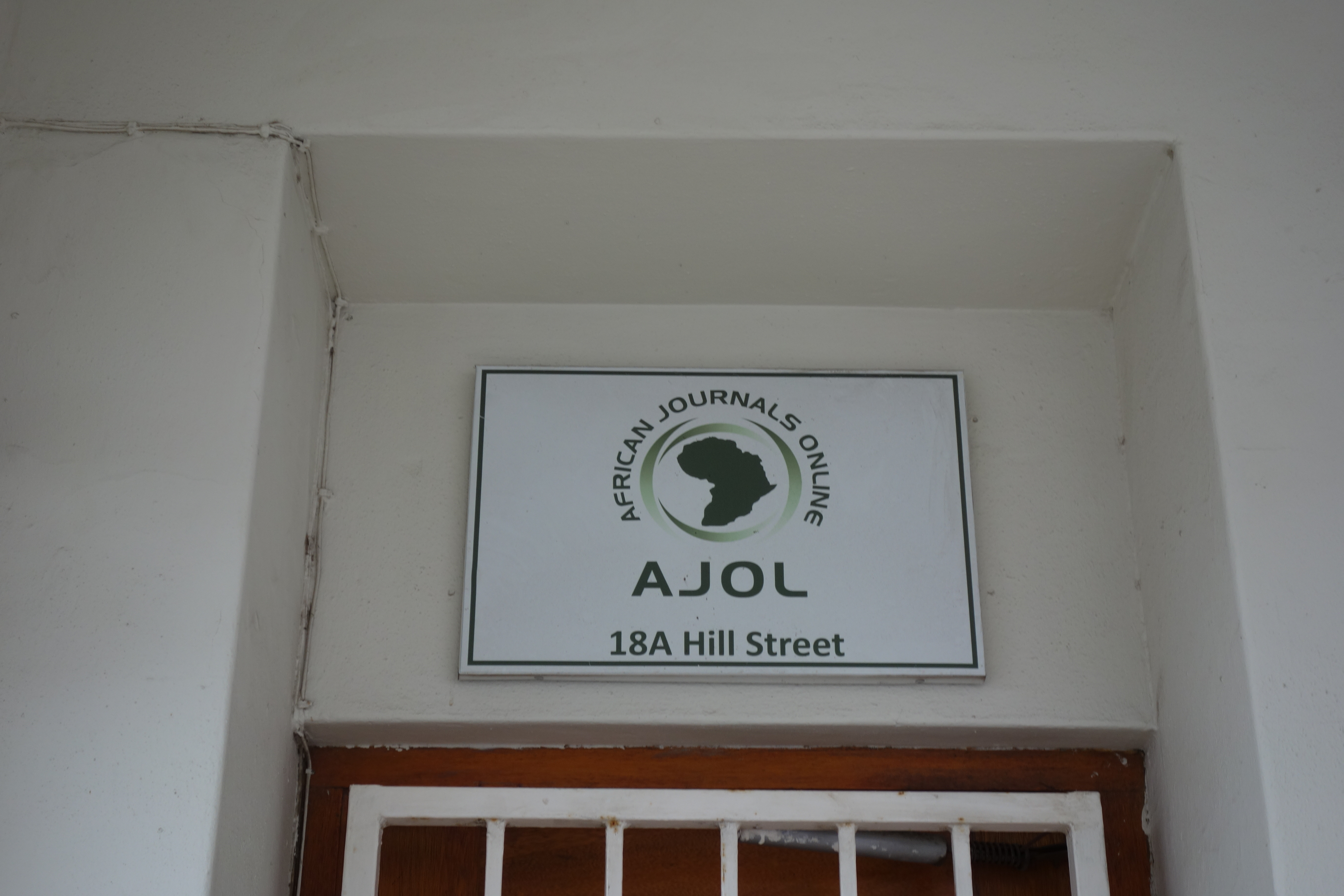
- Producer: African Journals OnLine (South Africa)
- History: 1998 to present

Access
- Cost: open access and subscription

Coverage
- Record depth: Index, abstract & full-text
- Format coverage: Journals
- Geospatial coverage: Africa

Links
- Website: www.ajol.info
- Title list(s): www.ajol.info/index.php/ajol/browseBy/alpha

African Journals OnLine (AJOL) is a South African non-profit organization with headquarters in Makhanda. It is dedicated to improving the online visibility and access to the published scholarly research of African-based academics. AJOL aims to enhance conditions for African learning as well as African development.

With partners INASP, AJOL developed the unique Journal Publishing Practices and Standards (JPPS) framework to increase the visibility and credibility of research published in the Southern hemisphere.

== Information inequality ==
Of the 50 least developed countries in the world, 33 are in Africa. There is widespread awareness of the importance of education in addressing poverty in the long term, usually with an emphasis on primary and secondary education. A concurrent focus on higher education on the continent is also needed for African countries to sustainably develop their capacity and economies and lift the region out of underdevelopment.

Primarily due to difficulties accessing them, African research papers have been under-utilised, under-valued and under-cited in the international and African research arenas. To date, the main information resources, published journals and journal articles available to and used by researchers, librarians and students in Africa are the same as those used in Europe and America. This is because information from the developed world is usually more readily available than that of developing countries. However, it does not adequately reflect the research output of Africa and is not always relevant or appropriate for higher education in Africa. Although access to global information resources is essential; equally important and essential is access to the local research output from the continent.

Despite the wide range of capacity and resources within and between African countries, a legitimate generalization is that strengthening research and research-publishing are crucial priorities for improving higher education in Africa. At the same time as information sources from the developed world are currently made available for free to Africa (such as HINARI, AGORA, OARE (Online Access to Research in the Environment), JSTOR African Access Initiative, and Aluka), there needs to be a corresponding focus on the online availability of information from Africa if increased local capacity in research and dissemination is to be attained. To this end, in a high-tech, information hungry and rapidly globalising world, higher education in Africa needs technological tools to share and build on its own research output with neighbouring countries and the rest of the world.

Scholarly journals remain a vital and entrenched means of academic communication. In the information age, providing electronic access to journals is necessary if that research is to reach the international audience. Many peer-reviewed scholarly journals published in Africa lack the means to host their content online in isolation. Others do have sufficient resources but cannot attain the online visibility necessary to increase awareness of their research. There is a need to support the ongoing functioning and sustainability of journals publishing research from Africa.

== Increasing access to African information ==
The mission of AJOL is to support African research and counter the "North-South" and "West-East" inequality of information flow by facilitating awareness of and access to research published in Africa. Information from developed countries is not necessarily as relevant or appropriate for Africa as that from within the continent. AJOL provides an online system for the aggregation of African-published scholarly journals and offers global access to and visibility of the research output of the continent. As such, AJOL's primary beneficiaries are scholarly, peer-reviewed, African-published journals, and secondary (also direct) beneficiaries are African and international members of the scholarly community needing to access African-published research.

AJOL hosts African-published, peer-reviewed scholarly journals for free – and includes both open access and subscription-based journals. The meta-data of all participating journals is open access on the AJOL website. AJOL also provides an article download service for researchers to access full text of individual articles.

AJOL hosts over 350 peer-reviewed journals from 27 African countries covering a variety of disciplines including health, education, agriculture, science and technology, the environment, and arts and culture. The number of participating journals and researchers using the service is growing continuously. AJOL hopes to eventually include all quality, peer-reviewed journals on the continent.

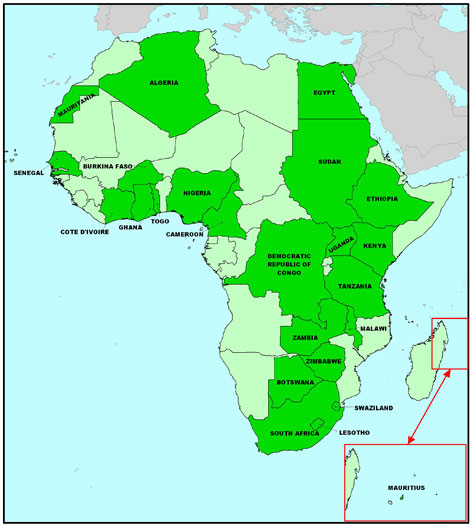
Countries with journals on AJOL

The AJOL website receives over 100,000 visits per month from over 190 countries around the world.

=== Background ===
The AJOL project was initiated in 1998 by the International Network for the Availability of Scientific Publications (INASP), a charitable organisation based in Oxford, in the United Kingdom. After a positive evaluation of the pilot in early 2000, AJOL was re-launched and expanded. Through INASP, AJOL formed a partnership with the Public Knowledge Project (PKP) relating to the open source software that underpins AJOL's online services. Following the proven need for the AJOL model in developing countries, INASP went on to establish similar fledgling "JOL"s in Bangladesh, Vietnam, Mongolia, and Nepal - all of which have now graduated to independent journal organisations.

== Partner organisations ==
- 997 participating African scholarly journals including 742 open access journals, 284 of which are Diamond Open Access (DOA) and coming from 39 African countries.
- International Network for the Availability of Scientific Publications; Collaborating with a wide network of partners in sister organisations, development agencies and publishers, INASP has implemented programmes in more than 40 countries worldwide. These programmes are designed for stakeholders engaged in all stages of the research communication cycle, with activities targeted to the needs of researchers, editors, national publishers, and librarians as well as ICT professionals. Following on from successfully initiating and establishing AJOL, INASP has established similar online journal projects in other regions, particularly in South and South East Asia. INASP also runs the Programme for the Enhancement of Research Information (PERI), which provides support to researchers around the world through access to information and training and support for the use of information.
- NISC SA; NISC SA (www.nisc.co.za) is an electronic publishing company specialising in bibliographic database products and African academic literature.
- The Public Knowledge Project; The Public Knowledge Project is a federally funded research initiative at the University of British Columbia and Simon Fraser University on the west coast of Canada. It seeks to improve the scholarly and public quality of academic research through the development of innovative online environments. PKP has developed free, open source software for the management, publishing, and indexing of journals and conferences. Open Journal Systems and Open Conference Systems increase access to knowledge, improve management, and reduce publishing costs. The AJOL database was developed using the open-source journal management software called Open Journal Systems (OJS). Working collaboratively with this organisation, AJOL has been able to create a high quality website with greatly enhanced functionality.
- Crossref. Since 2009, AJOL has been a member of and helped to govern Crossref, the global not-for-profit open scholarly infrastructure for Digital Object Identifiers (DOIs) and metadata, ensuring wide discoverability and citation linking of African research. Crossref waives/donates some countries' fees through its Global Equitable Membership (GEM) program. AJOL operates the DOI prefix 10.4314.
- OASPA, The Open Access Scholarly Publishing Association.
- The Association of African Universities.

=== Donor partners ===
AJOL was initially supported by the Ford Foundation and through INASP's Programme for the Enhancement of Research Information and subsequently since by the Royal Danish Ministry of Foreign Affairs (RDMFA), Sida, the UK Department for International Development (DFID), the Norwegian Agency for Development Cooperation (Norad), Wellcome, and SCOSS.

== Hosted journals ==
=== Active journals ===
Some of the journals hosted by AJOL are:

- Acta Theologica (ISSN 1015-8758))
- African Environment (ISSN 0850-8518)
- African Journal of Aquatic Science (ISSN 1608-5914)
- African Journal of Cross-Cultural Psychology and Sport Facilitation (ISSN 1119-7056)
- African Journal of Educational Studies in Mathematics and Sciences
- African Journal for Physical Activity and Health Sciences (ISSN 2411-6939)

=== Discontinued journals ===
AJOL also hosts the archives of several discontinued journals:

- African Journal of Political Economy, see African Journal of Political Science
- African Journal of Political Science (1997–2003, ISSN 1027-0353; from 1986 to 1990 published as African Journal of Political Economy ISSN 1017-4974)
- African Journal of Applied Zoology, see African Journal of Applied Zoology and Environmental Biology
- African Journal of Applied Zoology and Environmental Biology (1999–2006, ISSN 1119-023X; original title African Journal of Applied Zoology)
- African Journal of Science and Technology
- African Studies Monograph (2001–2007, ISSN 1119-7196

== See also ==
- Bangladesh Journals Online
- Open access in South Africa
- Open Access Scholarly Publishers Association
