= 1990 Ménaka raid =

Rebel skirmish with army in Mali

Raid on Ménaka (1990)
- Part of Tuareg rebellion (1990–1995)
Date	June 28–29, 1990
Location	Ménaka, Mali
Result	MPLA victory

Belligerents
Mali	MPLA

Commanders and leaders
Unknown	Iyad Ag Ghaly

Casualties and losses
14–36 killed	1 injured

Between June 28 and 29, 1990, Tuareg rebels from the People's Movement for the Liberation of Azawad (MPLA) attacked the Malian Army outpost at Ménaka, sparking the Tuareg rebellion of 1990 to 1996.

== Background ==
During the late 1980's, the Kidal Region of northern Mali, predominantly inhabited by Tuaregs, suffered several droughts and spurred many young Malian Tuaregs to enlist in Libya's Islamic Legion. During their time in the legion, many Malian Tuaregs saw their identity as more Tuareg than Malian, and perceived the Malian state as one that did not help them during the various droughts and displacement events of the past.

In May 1990, several hundred Tuaregs were arrested by local gendarmes in Tchin-Tabaraden, Niger after a clash with the gendarmes. Angered Tuaregs, viewing the arrests as arbitrary, attacked the town's police station where the detainees were being kept. In pursuit of the attackers, Nigerien forces massacred several hundred Tuaregs.

== Raid ==
On the evening of June 28, 1990, a troop of around fifty Tuareg fighters of the Popular Movement for the Liberation of Azawad commanded by Iyad Ag Ghaly arrived on the outskirts of Ménaka. The fighters traveled on camels and were poorly equipped, having only five Kalashnikovs, two hunting rifles, and sabers. The first ambush by the Tuaregs, in between Menaka and Tedjeret, targeted a convoy from World Vision International. The four Malians and two Americans working in the NGO were dropped off in Ikadewan, and their vehicles were taken.

The Tuaregs continued en route to Menaka, and attacked the Malian gendarmerie post in the city around 4am. The gendarmes were taken by surprise, and did not put up much resistance. The MPLA freed the Nigerien Tuaregs in the police station that had been threatened with extradition to Niger. The MPLA looted all the weapons in the gendarmerie's weaponry, and left in eight vehicles from World Vision International and the Italian company Zooconsuit. Gasoline and food were also looted from the Malian Food Products Office location in the town. The MPLA fighters left Menaka at dawn.

Thirty-six Malian gendarmes were killed during the raid and one was injured, according to French Tuareg researcher Pierre Boilley. The Malian newspaper September 22 claimed that fourteen people were killed, including four soldiers.

== Aftermath ==
Following the raid, various ethnic groups created their own rebel groups to fight against the Malian government, such as Malian Arabs creating the Front for the Liberation of Aïr and Azaouak (FLAA). Malian President Moussa Traoré agreed to the Tamanrasset Accords in 1991 creating a special status for Kidal Region, but the accords were never implemented due to the splintering of the MPLA and FLAA and the 1991 Malian coup d'état.
