= Pierre Boilley =

French historian and ethnographer

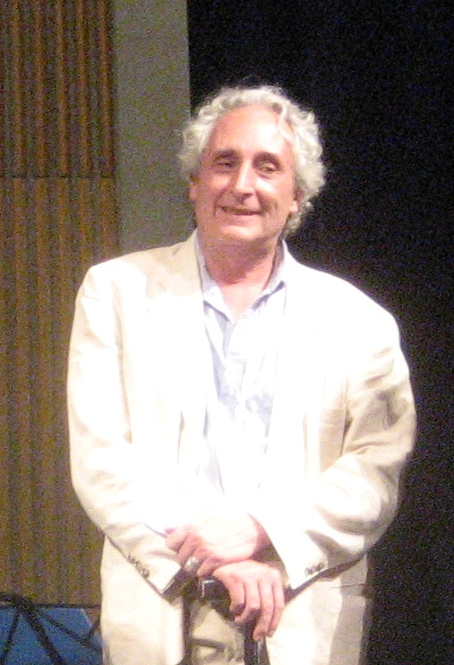
- Boilley in 2015
- Occupations: Historian, ethnographer

Academic background
- Education: Paris Diderot University

Academic work
- Discipline: Sub-Saharan African history, African social sciences
- Sub-discipline: Tuaregs
- Institutions: Paris Diderot University; University of Paris I

Pierre Boilley is a French historian and ethnographer, known for his focus on sub-Saharan Africa, particularly the Tuaregs. He was the director of the Center for African World Studies and is currently the director of the Institut des mondes africains.

== Early life ==
Boilley was born in 1957 to a father who was an accountant and a mother who was a nurse. After spending his primary and secondary schooling at the Lycée Carnot, he obtained a scientific baccalauréat and enrolled in biology at Jussieu Campus. Disappointed by the courses offered, he transferred to the University of Nanterre to study history. He obtained a DEUG in history in 1976, and completed his thesis in 1978 under Philippe Vigier about 1800s-era French newspaper La Democratie Pacifique. At the end of his studies, he climbed Mount Kilimanjaro. His travels across Africa made him love the continent.

Upon returning to France, Boilley earned a certificate in car mechanics and enrolled in Tamasheq classes at INALCO to earn a degree in the language. His goal was to be independent in communication and traveling to prepare for his next journey to the Sahara. He had bought a Peugeot 404 for the occasion. He made several trips to sub-Saharan Africa, where he gained a knowledge of local cultures.

== Academic career ==
Back in France, he taught for a while in secondary schools, before going back to school to finish his history degree. He obtained a DEA in 1989, and wrote a dissertation on the history of the Sahara under Catherine Coquery-Vidrovitch. In 1997, he defended a thesis titled "The Kel Adagh: A century of dependencies, from the capture of Timbuktu (1893) to the National Pact (1992)", still under the supervision of Coquery-Vidrovitch. He then became a professor at the University of Paris VII before becoming a tenured professor at the University of Paris I, where he took over the laboratory "Mutation africaines dans la longues durée". When the lab joined the Center for African World Studies (CEAf), he became the director of the CEAf. Boilley then spearheaded the merger of the CEAf and another lab. He became the director of the Institut des mondes africains in 2014, and then founded the Scientific Interest Group on Africa.

Boilley participated in and organized several reactions to Nicolas Sarkozy's Dakar speech. He was cited in numerous media appearances during the Northern Mali conflict as a result of the Tuareg rebellion of 2012.
