= Cean =

Cean or variants can refer to:

- Cean, a village in Săuca Commune, Satu Mare County, Romania
- Juan Agustín Ceán Bermúdez (1749 – 1829), a Spanish writer
- CEAN, or the Comprehensive Erlang Archive Network
- Centro Experimental de Animación, which organizes the Córdoba International Animation Festival – ANIMA in Córdoba, Argentina
- Centre d’étude d’Afrique noire, a research center at the University of Bordeaux in France, merged with another center to form the research institute Les Afriques dans le monde
- Ceán Chaffin (born 1957), an American filmmaker
