= IMAF =

IMAF may refer to:

- Institut des mondes africains, an interdisciplinary research unit of (i) the French National Center for Scientific Research, (ii) the French Research Institute for Development, (iii) Pantheon-Sorbonne University, (iv) Aix-Marseille University, (v) École pratique des hautes études, and (vi) the School for Advanced Studies in the Social Sciences
- International Martial Arts Federation, a Japanese organization promoting Budō
- International Military Assistance Forces, a former military coalition during the Vietnam War
- International Modern Arnis Federation, an organization for the promotion and administration of Modern Arnis
