= African studies =

Africa. An orthographic projection, 2009.

African studies is the study of Africa, especially the continent's cultures and societies (as opposed to its geology, geography, zoology, etc.). The field includes the study of Africa's history (pre-colonial, colonial, post-colonial), demography (ethnic groups), culture, politics, economy, languages, and religion (Islam, Christianity, traditional religions). A specialist in African studies is often referred to as an "Africanist".

Africanists argue that there is a need to "deexoticize" Africa and banalise it, rather than understand Africa as exceptionalized and exoticized. African scholars, in recent times, have focused on decolonizing African studies, and reconfiguring it to reflect the African experience through an African lens.

== History ==
Some of the earliest mentions of Africa are by Herodotus and the Book of Genesis. The early anthropological foundations for much of the knowledge about Africa in modern academic fields, including African studies, are the European exploration of Africa and the Atlantic slave trade by explorers and missionaries as well as the colonial Scramble for Africa by European imperialists. With the start of decolonization of Africa, the Cold War, international development agendas, and Area Studies, which had increasing policy relevance in this emerging environment, this resulted in the mass development of African Studies organizations (e.g., centers, institutes) throughout continental Africa after 1945. Following African independence, many colonial staff in Europe and Africa became the staff of the emergent African Studies organizations.

Following African independence and the end of World War II, colonial methods of producing knowledge underwent challenges and changes. Due to World War II occurring and Africa not being directly partaking in it, the African world was viewed by many Africans as a distinct option apart from the Eastern world and Western world, and African leaders (e.g., Nnamdi Azikiwe, Kwame Nkrumah, Leopold Senghor) refused to accept the presumptions of European imperialism and advocated for Africans to have a knowledge of themselves due to this being essential to the political and economic wellness of their citizenry. Consequently, the dialectics of African independence made way for European scholars, such as Basil Davidson and Thomas Hodgkin, to begin to contest colonial ideas and standards (e.g., requirements of documentary evidence like what was used for the history of Europe) that resulted in the history of Africa being dismissed. The inherent dynamics of Africa and the value and use of African orature as a form of evidence was underscored by African scholar, Kenneth Dike. In 1964, the General History of Africa was developed by various African scholars (e.g., Jacob Ajayi, Adu Boahen, Ali Mazrui, Djibril Tamsir Niane, Bethwell Allan Ogot, Ki-Zerbo).

After the period of colonialism had ceased, African intellectuals constructed and organized the African higher education system in Africa, and in response to this development, during the 1950s and 1960s, Europeans in the United Kingdom created African studies institutions. The shortcomings of Western disciplinary approaches to the study of Africa resulted in the development of an interdisciplinary configuration of African studies. With some degree of interaction (e.g., collaboration, debate) with their African counterparts, by 1963, the African Studies Association of the United Kingdom (ASAUK) was founded, and by 1964, its first yearly conference was organized and attended.

With the spread of nationalism, once the African higher education system began to undergo Africanization and its effects began to set in, question and criticism of the fundamental ideas of African studies began to occur as well as improvement of scientific theories and research methods, which developed an African studies that studied African affairs and phenomena, and was undertaken and driven by Africans; the African intellectuals that drove this nationalist historiography drew from local epistemic communities while partaking in the international academic community.

With an increasing realization of the lasting impacts of enslavement and colonialism that were still present during the middle of the 1970s, Walter Rodney theorized about and authored, How Europe Underdeveloped Africa. African scholars added to this theorization in highlighting the patterns of domination and inequality between Europeans and Africans. Deconstructionist methods contributed to the increasing realization that European imperialistic ideas and conceptualizations of evidence, data, and truth interfered with the ability of researchers to engage with the ideas and conceptualizations that were held by and lived out by Africans in their daily lives.

While research focus on Africa decreased in the United Kingdom during the 1980s, this was counterbalanced by an increasing research focus on Africa in the United States. After the Civil Rights movement, there was increased collaboration between African and African American scholars. African scholars played a valuable role, via their research and direct cultural connections to/in Africa, in the development of Africana studies. In addition to the Royal African Society collaborating with ASAUK to keep it viable, various African scholars (e.g., Reginald Cline-Cole, Raufu Mustapha, Ola Uduku, Tunde Zack-Williams) in the United Kingdom steered development of African studies in the newer direction of accountability of African leaders and in including the African diaspora in the scope of its research focus.

As African countries experienced economic turmoil in the middle of the 1980s, the African higher education system and African studies also experienced turmoil (e.g., book famine, brain drain, collapse of the culture of research, collapse of local/epistemic communities and professional associations, decline in the ability of scholars to travel locally, infrastructure decay). The nationalist historiography that had spread earlier began to contract, even as neoliberal analyses and criticisms expanded, which sought to frame the condition of Africa in terms of pathology and power as it relates to principles of good governance and market efficiency. Under the guise of African development, African systems of higher education (e.g., university missions, visions, curriculums, conceptual tools and theoretical foundations of social research) were subsequently revised to conform to the vision and principles of neoliberalism.

Development studies became increasingly interconnected with African studies, as it had undergone growth as a discipline and was enriched by other fields (e.g., humanities, social sciences, natural sciences). A considerable number of African studies organizations, which have been financed or financially influenced by foreign government aid provided from North America, Europe, and Asia, have undergone volatility as the pattern of foreign government aid has become volatile; consequently, trends in Africanist scholarship has tended to reflect general optimism or pessimism (e.g., Afro-pessimism in African studies during the 1990s). With the factor of non-governmental organizations in Africa, and their use of scholarship from African studies, this has resulted in funders of non-governmental organizations also influencing the focus and development of the scholarship of renowned Africanists; the scholarship then becomes used in future development policies of funders and renowned Africanists may even serve as policy consultants to the European countries providing the funding (e.g., neopatrimonialist analysis of African policy economy and society, the international institutions informed by these analyzes, and the conditional policies employed to induce neo-liberal market reforms in Africa).

Given increasing indications that a post-Cold War world did not lead to increasing peace, Africa became a greater focal point of study for North America and Europe by the early 2000s. Reasons for increased study range from the restoration of civil and democratic institutions and government in Africa, to the third wave of African literature in Africa and the next up-and-coming scholars inspired by the literature, to Africa being projected to have the largest youth demographic in the world by 2050, to increasing investment by Asian countries, including China, to the United Kingdom seeking to reposition itself after Brexit. The increasing interest in the study of Africa has contributed to the growth of African Studies Associations, including ASAUK and the Africa-Europe Group for Interdisciplinary Studies (AEGIS), as well as increased research focus on Africa by African studies organizations in Africa.

The marketization of African higher education has resulted in the funding of grants rather than posts, as well as a transition toward contract-based (e.g., fixed term, part-time) hiring of academic professionals. Due to these market forces, long-term academic relationships (e.g., networks, collaborations) became increasingly temporary, which subsequently stifled the ability for innovative studies to be undertaken. Additionally, research focuses became increasingly narrowed to what would be the most likely to attract grant money. With the transition of academic publications from print to Internet media, colonial and racial hierarchies were generally reinforced as online Anglophone media publications mediated international/non-African academic discourses and print-based media publications mediated African academic discourses. Further, African scholars continue to experience racism, bias, and discrimination as well as continue to be underrepresented in the higher education system of the United Kingdom. Furthermore, the exclusivity and predominance of European-American epistemologies and methodologies contribute to perceptions of European scholars being experts and bearers of universal truth and African scholars and other scholars of color as bearing only a limited expertise in their cultural heritage and identity. The imperialistic power dynamics between non-Africans and Africans in shaping the narrative in African studies about Africa remains an ongoing problem.

While the Council for the Development of Social Science Research in Africa (CODESRIA) contributes considerable funding to African studies research to various countries (e.g., Ghana, Kenya, Nigeria, Senegal, South Africa) in Africa, much of the funding sources for research originate from sources abroad. Non-African Africanists tend to operate in the role as perceived experts of the field, who shape the image and view of Africa to countries abroad, whereas African researchers tend to operate in the role of consultants/assistants. Consequently, the narrative in African studies tends to reflect non-African interests and views rather than African interests and views.

Since African independence, the long-term effects and persisting elements of enslavement and colonialism (e.g., racist fantasies and projections, silencing of the past) continue to affect Africans on the continent and in the diaspora. After roughly 40 years, Africanization of the curriculums (e.g., theory, method, evidence) in Africa remains ongoing.

== Historiographic and conceptual problems of North Africa and sub-Saharan Africa ==
=== Historiographic and conceptual problems ===
The current major problem in African studies that Mohamed (2010/2012) identified is the inherited religious, Orientalist, colonial paradigm that European Africanists have preserved in present-day secularist, post-colonial, Anglophone African historiography. African and African-American scholars also bear some responsibility in perpetuating this European Africanist preserved paradigm.

Following conceptualizations of Africa developed by Leo Africanus and Hegel, European Africanists conceptually separated continental Africa into two racialized regions – sub-Saharan Africa and North Africa. Sub-Saharan Africa, as a racist geographic construction, serves as an objectified, compartmentalized region of "Africa proper", "Africa noire," or "Black Africa." The African diaspora is also considered to be a part of the same racialized construction as Sub-Saharan Africa. North Africa serves as a racialized region of "European Africa", which is conceptually disconnected from Sub-Saharan Africa, and conceptually connected to the Middle East, Asia, and the Islamic world.

As a result of these racialized constructions and the conceptual separation of Africa, darker skinned North Africans, such as the so-called Haratin, who have long resided in the Maghreb, and do not reside south of Saharan Africa, have become analogically alienated from their indigeneity and historic reality in North Africa. While the origin of the term "Haratin" remains speculative, the term may not date much earlier than the 18th century CE and has been involuntarily assigned to darker skinned Maghrebians. Prior to the modern use of the term Haratin as an identifier, and utilized in contrast to bidan or bayd (white), sumr/asmar, suud/aswad, or sudan/sudani (black/brown) were Arabic terms utilized as identifiers for darker skinned Maghrebians before the modern period. "Haratin" is considered to be an offensive term by the darker skinned Maghrebians it is intended to identify; for example, people in the southern region (e.g., Wad Noun, Draa) of Morocco consider it to be an offensive term. Despite its historicity and etymology being questionable, European colonialists and European Africanists have used the term Haratin as identifiers for groups of "black" and apparently "mixed" people found in Algeria, Mauritania, and Morocco.

The Saadian invasion of the Songhai Empire serves as the precursor to later narratives that grouped darker skinned Maghrebians together and identified their origins as being Sub-Saharan West Africa. With gold serving as a motivation behind the Saadian invasion of the Songhai Empire, this made way for changes in latter behaviors toward dark-skinned Africans. As a result of changing behaviors toward dark-skinned Africans, darker skinned Maghrebians were forcibly recruited into the army of Ismail Ibn Sharif as the Black Guard, based on the claim of them having descended from enslaved peoples from the times of the Saadian invasion. Shurafa historians of the modern period would later utilize these events in narratives about the manumission of enslaved "Hartani" (a vague term, which, by merit of it needing further definition, is implicit evidence for its historicity being questionable). The narratives derived from Shurafa historians would later become analogically incorporated into the Americanized narratives (e.g., the trans-Saharan slave trade, imported enslaved Sub-Saharan West Africans, darker skinned Magrebian freedmen) of the present-day European Africanist paradigm.

As opposed to having been developed through field research, the analogy in the present-day European Africanist paradigm, which conceptually alienates, dehistoricizes, and denaturalizes darker skinned North Africans in North Africa and darker skinned Africans throughout the Islamic world at-large, is primarily rooted in an Americanized textual tradition inherited from 19th century European Christian abolitionists. Consequently, reliable history, as opposed to an antiquated analogy-based history, for darker skinned North Africans and darker skinned Africans in the Islamic world are limited. Part of the textual tradition generally associates an inherited status of servant with dark skin (e.g., Negro labor, Negro cultivators, Negroid slaves, freedman). The European Africanist paradigm uses this as the primary reference point for its construction of origins narratives for darker skinned North Africans (e.g., imported slaves from Sub-Saharan West Africa). With darker skinned North Africans or darker skinned Africans in the Islamic world treated as an allegory of alterity, another part of the textual tradition is the trans-Saharan slave trade and their presence in these regions are treated as that of an African diaspora in North Africa and the Islamic world. Altogether, darker skinned North Africans (e.g., "black" and apparently "mixed" Maghrebians), darker skinned Africans in the Islamic world, the inherited status of servant associated with dark skin, and the trans-Saharan slave trade are conflated and modeled in analogy with African Americans and the trans-Atlantic slave trade.

The trans-Saharan slave trade has been used as a literary device in narratives that analogically explain the origins of darker skinned North Africans in North Africa and the Islamic world. Caravans have been equated with slave ships, and the amount of forcibly enslaved Africans transported across the Sahara are alleged to be numerically comparable to the considerably large amount of forcibly enslaved Africans transported across the Atlantic Ocean. The simulated narrative of comparable numbers is contradicted by the limited presence of darker skinned North Africans in the present-day Maghreb. As part of this simulated narrative, post-classical Egypt has also been characterized as having plantations. Another part of this simulated narrative is an Orientalist construction of hypersexualized Moors, concubines, and eunuchs. Concubines in harems have been used as an explanatory bridge between the allegation of comparable numbers of forcibly enslaved Africans and the limited amount of present-day darker skinned Maghrebians who have been characterized as their diasporic descendants. Eunuchs were characterized as sentinels who guarded these harems. The simulated narrative is also based on the major assumption that the indigenous peoples of the Maghreb were once purely white Berbers, who then became biracialized through miscegenation with black concubines (existing within a geographic racial binary of pale-skinned Moors residing further north, closer to the Mediterranean region, and dark-skinned Moors residing further south, closer to the Sahara). The religious polemical narrative involving the suffering of enslaved European Christians of the Barbary slave trade has also been adapted to fit the simulated narrative of a comparable number of enslaved Africans being transported by Muslim slaver caravans, from the south of Saharan Africa, into North Africa and the Islamic world.

Despite being an inherited part of the 19th century religious polemical narratives, the use of race in the secularist narrative of the present-day European Africanist paradigm has given the paradigm an appearance of possessing scientific quality. The religious polemical narrative (e.g., holy cause, hostile neologisms) of 19th century European abolitionists about Africa and Africans are silenced, but still preserved, in the secularist narratives of the present-day European Africanist paradigm. The Orientalist stereotyped hypersexuality of the Moors were viewed by 19th century European abolitionists as deriving from the Quran. The reference to times prior, often used in concert with biblical references, by 19th century European abolitionists, may indicate that realities described of Moors may have been literary fabrications. The purpose of these apparent literary fabrications may have been to affirm their view of the Bible as being greater than the Quran and to affirm the viewpoints held by the readers of their composed works. The adoption of 19th century European abolitionists' religious polemical narrative into the present-day European Africanist paradigm may have been due to its correspondence with the established textual tradition. The use of stereotyped hypersexuality for Moors are what 19th century European abolitionists and the present-day European Africanist paradigm have in common.

Due to a lack of considerable development in field research regarding enslavement in Islamic societies, this has resulted in the present-day European Africanist paradigm relying on unreliable estimates for the trans-Saharan slave trade. However, insufficient data has also used as a justification for continued use of the faulty present-day European Africanist paradigm. Darker skinned Maghrebians, particularly in Morocco, have grown weary of the lack of discretion foreign academics have shown toward them, bear resentment toward the way they have been depicted by foreign academics, and consequently, find the intended activities of foreign academics to be predictable. Rather than continuing to rely on the faulty present-day European Africanist paradigm, Mohamed (2012) recommends revising and improving the current Africanist paradigm (e.g., critical inspection of the origins and introduction of the present characterization of the Saharan caravan; reconsideration of what makes the trans-Saharan slave trade, within its own context in Africa, distinct from the trans-Atlantic slave trade; realistic consideration of the experiences of darker-skinned Maghrebians within their own regional context).

=== Conceptual problems ===
Merolla (2017) has indicated that the academic study of sub-Saharan Africa and North Africa by Europeans developed with North Africa being conceptually subsumed within the Middle East and Arab world, whereas, the study of sub-Saharan Africa was viewed as conceptually distinct from North Africa, and as its own region, viewed as inherently the same. The common pattern of conceptual separation of continental Africa into two regions and the view of conceptual sameness within the region of sub-Saharan Africa has continued until present-day. Yet, with increasing exposure of this problem, discussion about the conceptual separation of Africa has begun to develop.

The Sahara has served as a trans-regional zone for peoples in Africa. Authors from various countries (e.g., Algeria, Cameroon, Sudan) in Africa have critiqued the conceptualization of the Sahara as a regional barrier, and provided counter-arguments supporting the interconnectedness of continental Africa; there are historic and cultural connections as well as trade between West Africa, North Africa, and East Africa (e.g., North Africa with Niger and Mali, North Africa with Tanzania and Sudan, major hubs of Islamic learning in Niger and Mali). Africa has been conceptually compartmentalized into meaning "Black Africa", "Africa South of the Sahara", and "sub-Saharan Africa." North Africa has been conceptually "Orientalized" and separated from sub-Saharan Africa. While its historic development has occurred within a longer time frame, the epistemic development (e.g., form, content) of the present-day racialized conceptual separation of Africa came as a result of the Berlin Conference and the Scramble for Africa.

In African and Berber literary studies, scholarship has remained largely separate from one another. The conceptual separation of Africa in these studies may be due to how editing policies of studies in the Anglophone and Francophone world are affected by the international politics of the Anglophone and Francophone world. While studies in the Anglophone world have more clearly followed the trend of the conceptual separation of Africa, the Francophone world has been more nuanced, which may stem from imperial policies relating to French colonialism in North Africa and sub-Saharan Africa. As the study of North Africa has largely been initiated by the Arabophone and Francophone world, denial of the Arabic language having become Africanized throughout the centuries it has been present in Africa has shown that the conceptual separation of Africa remains pervasive in the Francophone world; this denial may stem from historic development of the characterization of an Islamic Arabia existing as a diametric binary to Europe. Among studies in the Francophone world, ties between North Africa and sub-Saharan Africa have been denied or downplayed, while the ties (e.g., religious, cultural) between the regions and peoples (e.g., Arab language and literature with Berber language and literature) of the Middle East and North Africa have been established by diminishing the differences between the two and selectively focusing on the similarities between the two. In the Francophone world, construction of racialized regions, such as Black Africa (sub-Saharan Africans) and White Africa (North Africans, e.g., Berbers and Arabs), has also developed.

Despite having invoked and utilized identities in reference to the racialized conceptualizations of Africa (e.g., North Africa, Sub-Saharan Africa) to oppose imposed identities, Berbers have invoked North African identity to oppose Arabized and Islamicized identities, and sub-Saharan Africans (e.g., Negritude, Black Consciousness) and the African diaspora (e.g., Black is Beautiful) have invoked and utilized black identity to oppose colonialism and racism. While Berber studies has largely sought to be establish ties between Berbers and North Africa with Arabs and the Middle East, Merolla (2017) indicated that efforts to establish ties between Berbers and North Africa with sub-Saharan Africans and sub-Saharan Africa have recently started to being undertaken.

== University-based centers ==
- Austria: Institut für Afrikawissenschaften (est. 2007), University of Vienna
- Belgium: Ghent University
- Canada: Institute of African Studies, Carleton University, Ottawa
- China:
  - Institute of African Studies, Zhejiang Normal University
  - School of Asian and African Studies, Beijing Foreign Studies University
  - School of Asian and African Studies, Shanghai International Studies University
- Denmark: Centre of African Studies, University of Copenhagen
- Egypt: Faculty of African Postgraduate Studies, Cairo University
- Ethiopia: Center for African Studies, Addis Ababa University, Ethiopia
- France:
  - Institut des mondes africains (IMAF), Aix-Marseille University and Paris 1 Panthéon-Sorbonne University
  - Les Afriques dans le monde (LAM), University of Bordeaux, Bordeaux Montaigne University and University of Pau and the Adour Region
- Germany:
  - Institute of African Studies, University of Bayreuth, Germany
  - Department of African Studies, Humboldt University, Germany
  - Institute for Asian and African Studies, Humboldt University, Germany
  - Institute of African Studies, University of Leipzig, Germany
- Ghana: Kwame Nkrumah Institute of African Studies, University of Ghana, Legon, Ghana
- India:
  - Department of African Studies, Faculty of Social Sciences Delhi University, New Delhi
  - Centre for African Studies; Indian School of International Studies, Jawaharlal Nehru University New Delhi
  - Centre for African Studies, University of Mumbai Mumbai, Maharashtra
- Netherlands: African Studies Centre, Leiden
- Italy:
  - Department of Asian, African and Mediterranean Studies, Università di Napoli l' Orientale
- Nigeria:
  - Institute of African Studies, University of Ibadan
  - Institute of African and Diaspora Studies, University of Lagos
- Portugal:
  - Centre for International Studies (formerly, Centre for African Studies), ISCTE – University Institute of Lisbon
  - Center for African and Development Studies (CEsA, ISEG-ULisboa), Instituto Superior de Economia e Gestão da Universidade de Lisboa
  - African Studies Centre of the University of Porto, Porto
- Russia:
  - Department of African Studies, Institute of Asian and African Countries, Moscow State University
  - Department of African Studies, St. Petersburg University
- South Africa: Centre for African Studies (CAS), University of Cape Town
- Sweden: Center for African Studies, Dalarna University, Sweden
- UK:
  - Centre of West African Studies, University of Birmingham
  - Centre of African Studies, University of Cambridge
  - Centre for African Studies, University of Leeds
  - School of Oriental and African Studies, SOAS University of London
- US:
  - African Studies Center, Boston University
  - University of Florida Center for African Studies
  - Department of African Studies at Howard University
  - African Studies Program at Indiana University
  - African Studies Center, Michigan State University
  - Program of African Studies at Northwestern University
  - Department of African, Middle Eastern, and South Asian Languages and Literatures at Rutgers, the State University of New Jersey
  - African Studies Center, UCLA
  - African Studies Program, University of Wisconsin-Madison

== National and transnational centers ==
- Africa Research Institute, London
- Nordic Africa Institute, Uppsala

== Associations ==
- AEGIS (Europe)
- African Heritage Studies Association (AHSA, North America)
- African Studies Association (ASA, North America)
- African Studies Association of Africa (ASAA)
- African Studies Association of Australasia and the Pacific (ASAAP)
- African Studies Association of the United Kingdom (ASAUK)

== Projects ==
- Bamum Scripts and Archives Project
- Internet library sub-saharan Africa (ilissAfrica)
- Timbuktu Manuscripts Project

== Degree programs ==
Canada

- Carleton University, Institute of African Studies - Combined Honours Undergraduate Degrees and Collaborative Masters in African Studies

Egypt

- Cairo University, Institute of African Research and Studies

Ethiopia

- University of Addis Ababa, Center for African Studies

France

- Université Bordeaux-Montaigne, Sciences Po Bordeaux (in collaboration with University of Bayreuth, Germany), International Master of African Studies

Germany

- Humboldt University, Bachelor in Area Studies Asia/Africa and Master in African Studies
- Universität Bayreuth, Masters in Development Studies, European Interdisciplinary Master African Studies, African Studies: Critical perspectives on society, politics, culture

Ghana

- University of Ghana, Masters and PhD in African Studies

Italy

- Università degli Studi di Napoli "L'Orientale", Bachelor, Masters and PhD in African Studies

India

- Delhi University, Department of African Studies, Faculty of Social Sciences - MA African Studies and Phd African Studies
- University of Mumbai, Centre for African Studies - Master's and PhD African Studies
- Jawaharlal Nehru University, Indian School of International Studies - Master's and PhD African Studies

Morocco

- University Mohammed VI Polytechnic, Center for African Studies

Netherlands

- Leiden University, African Studies Centre - MA African Studies and MPhil Research Master African Studies

Nigeria University of Lagos, Masters in African and Diaspora Studies

- University of Ibadan, Nigeria Masters and PhD in African Studies

Switzerland

- University of Basel, Center for African Studies Basel - MA African Studies
- University of Geneva, Global Studies Institute- MA African Studies

United Kingdom

- University of Cambridge, Centre of African Studies - MPhil in African Studies

United States of America

- Beloit College, African Studies Minor - Interdisciplinary undergraduate minor field of concentration
- Brigham Young University, Africana Studies minor, undergraduate area studies degree
- Florida International University, Masters in African Studies, African Studies Certificate
- Howard University, undergraduate minor and major in African Studies, Masters in African Studies, PhD in African Studies
- Ohio University, Masters in African Studies
- Penn State University, undergraduate minor and major in African Studies, Dual Title PhD program
- Rutgers University, undergraduate major and minor in African, Middle Eastern, and South Asian Languages and Literatures, with a regional focus
- University of Michigan, undergraduate major and minor in Afroamerican and African Studies. Also, a certificate in African Studies for graduate students.
- Indiana University, undergraduate major and minor in African Studies, Masters in African Studies, and PhD minor in African Studies

== See also ==
- Africa Bibliography for a categorised list of publications in the field since 1984
- Ethiopian studies and Ethiopian historiography
- List of africanists
- List of African studies journals
- Outline of Africa for a list of articles relating to Africa
