= IlissAfrica =

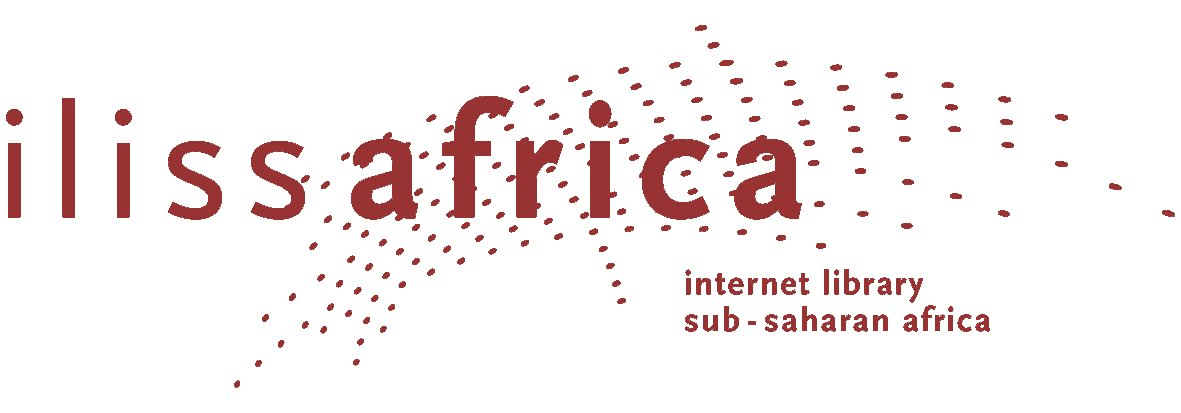
Logo of ilissAfrica

The Internet Library Sub-saharan Africa (ilissAfrica) is a German Internet portal that offers an integrated access to relevant scientific information resources (conventional and digital) in the field of African Studies and the region Africa South of the Sahara. ilissAfrica covers social sciences, history, philology, ethnology and cultural studies. The website is presented in German, English and French.

With ilissAfrica users can search databases and library catalogues. They can also look for websites that are relevant for their research interests.

The main modules of ilissAfrica are:

The General Search
A meta search that searches through several databases and library catalogues simultaneously. At present, the following catalogues are integrated:

- the Africa part of the catalogue of the University Library Frankfurt which is in charge of the Special Collection Africa South of the Sahara of the German Research Foundation
- the Africa part of the catalogue of the GIGA German Institute of Global and Area Studies Hamburg which is in charge of the Special Collection Africa South of the Sahara (grey literature) of the German Research Foundation
- the catalogue of the library of the African Studies Centre Leiden (the biggest library for scientific Africa literature in the Netherlands)
- the catalogue of the Nordic Africa Institute library in Uppsala/Sweden (joint library for the Scandinavian countries)
- the catalogue of the library of the Department of Anthropology and African Studies Mainz/Germany (incl. the Jahn Library for African Literatures)
- the Retro Catalogue of the University Library Frankfurt (literature that was acquired before 1986)
- the OLC-SSG section “Africa South of the Sahara” (reference to articles of 170 African Studies journals)
- the Internet Database of ilissAfrica
- the Africa section of Bielefeld Academic Search Engine (BASE)
- the Colonial Picture Archive with 50.000 digitized historical pictures of Frankfurt University Library, Germany, and of the Sam Cohen Library, Swakopmund, Namibia.

The Internet Database
So far it contains more than 4500 selected Africa-related Internet links. Built up by the ilissAfrica staff this pool of websites is searchable as the sites are classified, categorised, keyword indexed and provided with an abstract.

The Database for Junior Researchers (at present in German only)
A persons database for junior researchers in the African Studies in Germany. Interested junior researchers can register on the ilissAfrica website. The profiles are globally visible.

The Open Access Guide
A guide for researchers based in Africa with projects offering cheap or free access to databases and e-journals. It has a section on Books for Africa, e.g. where libraries can get book donations or other support.

The Bielefeld Academic Search Engine (BASE)
The Bielefeld Academic Search Engine (BASE) is a multidisciplinary search engine for open access academic publications. In ilissAfrica a special sub-section of OAI-repositories on and from Africa has been selected: AJOL, 30 institutional repositories in Africa like SUNScholar, European projects like Cairn, HAL, Gallica and Persée and important digital libraries of SOAS, LSE, Michigan, Illinois, Indiana and Harvard Universities. 75% of the indexed documents are on Open Access. BASE is an example of the potential of the linked web via standardized interfaces. And it helps to increase the visibility of academic knowledge produced and stored in the South.

German and European Collaboration
ilissAfrica is a project of the Africa section of the University Library Frankfurt and the GIGA German Institute of Global and Area Studies in Hamburg. Both are in charge of the German Special Collection "Africa south of the Sahara". It is financed by the German Research Foundation (DFG). ilissAfrica is closely related to the association "European Librarians in African Studies" (ELIAS) as a European network aiming to promote professional exchange and cooperation among its members. The "Africa Section" of the Electronic Journals Library (EZB) was one source for the Wikipedia-article African Studies Journals. ilissAfrica allows the coordinated acquisition of free electronic documents of the partner libraries.

== Related digital libraries ==
- MENALIB
- EVIFA
- cibera
- ViFaRom
- Vlib-AAC: History
- Vlib-AAC: Literature
- IREON
