= Chabal =

Chabal is a surname. Notable people with the surname include:

- Patrick Chabal (1951–2014), Africanist
- Sébastien Chabal (born 1977), French rugby union player
