= Pyry Soiri =

Finnish footballer (born 1994)

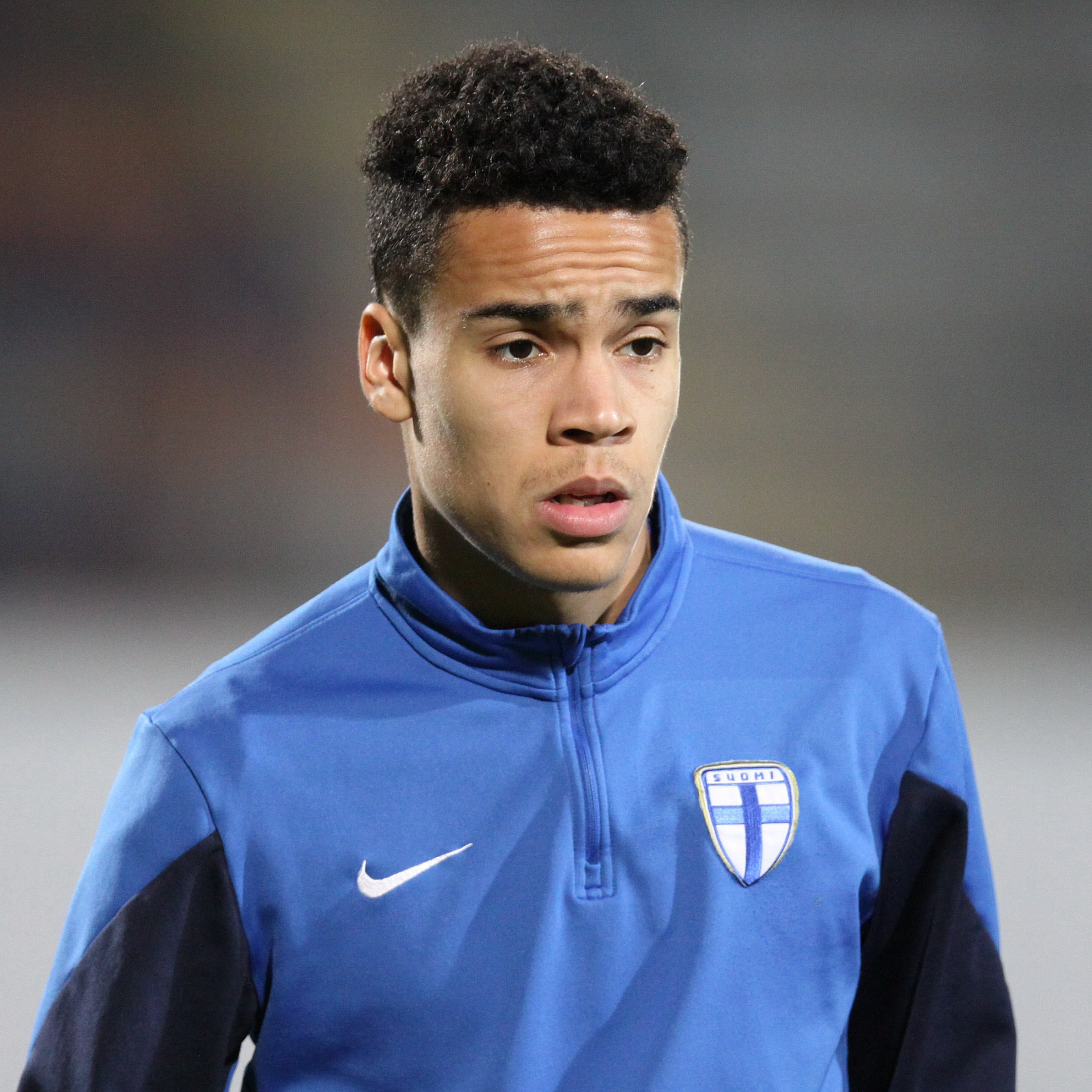
- Soiri with Finland U21 in 2015

Personal information
- Full name: Pyry Henri Hidipo Soiri
- Date of birth: 22 September 1994 (age 32)
- Place of birth: Ekenäs, Finland
- Height: 1.83 m (6 ft 0 in)
- Positions: Midfielder; defender

Team information
- Current team: Anagennisi Karditsa
- Number: 23

Youth career
- 2000–2009: PPJ
- 2010–2011: MYPA

Senior career*
Years	Team	Apps	(Gls)
2011–2014	MYPA	50	(1)
2012	→ JäPS (loan)	2	(0)
2012	→ KTP (loan)	12	(2)
2015–2017	VPS	62	(14)
2017–2018	Shakhtyor Soligorsk	26	(3)
2018–2019	Admira Wacker	12	(2)
2019–2021	Esbjerg fB	50	(4)
2022–2023	HJK	37	(3)
2022	→ Klubi 04	1	(1)
2024	Universitatea Craiova	5	(0)
2024–2025	Athens Kallithea	32	(3)
2026–	Anagennisi Karditsa	8	(0)

International career^{‡}
2013	Finland U19	2	(0)
2013–2014	Finland U20	5	(1)
2014–2016	Finland U21	13	(0)
2017–2024	Finland	45	(7)
- * Club domestic league appearances and goals as of 20 April 2026 ‡ National team caps and goals as of 4 June 2024

Pyry Soiri (born 22 September 1994) is a Finnish professional footballer who plays as a defender for Super League Greece 2 club Anagennisi Karditsa.

== Early life ==
Soiri was born in Ekenäs, Finland, to a Finnish mother, Iina Soiri, and a Namibian father, he spent most of his childhood in Africa. He holds both Finnish and Namibian citizenships. His football journey began in the youth sector of PPJ in Helsinki in 2000.

== Club career ==
=== MYPA ===
Soiri spent his last years on youth level in MYPA and debuted in Veikkausliiga with the first team in April 2012, aged 17, in a match against Jaro. During the 2012 season, he was also loaned out to Kakkonen teams JäPS and KTP in Finnish third level. During the next 2013 Veikkausliiga season, he secured his place in the team and gained 22 caps and 1 goal.

=== VPS ===
In 2015 Soiri transferred to fellow Veikkausliiga club Vaasan Palloseura (VPS) signing a two-year deal. During his two seasons with VPS, he made 62 appearances in Veikkausliiga scoring 14 goals. He also represented the club in the UEFA Europa League qualifiers.

=== Shakhtyor Soligorsk ===
In February 2017 Soiri signed a deal with Belarusian Premier League side Shakhtyor Soligorsk for an undisclosed fee.

=== Admira Wacker ===
In August 2018 Soiri transferred to Austrian Bundesliga club Admira Wacker. Soiri made 12 appearances and scored two goals for the club, before he left after just one season.

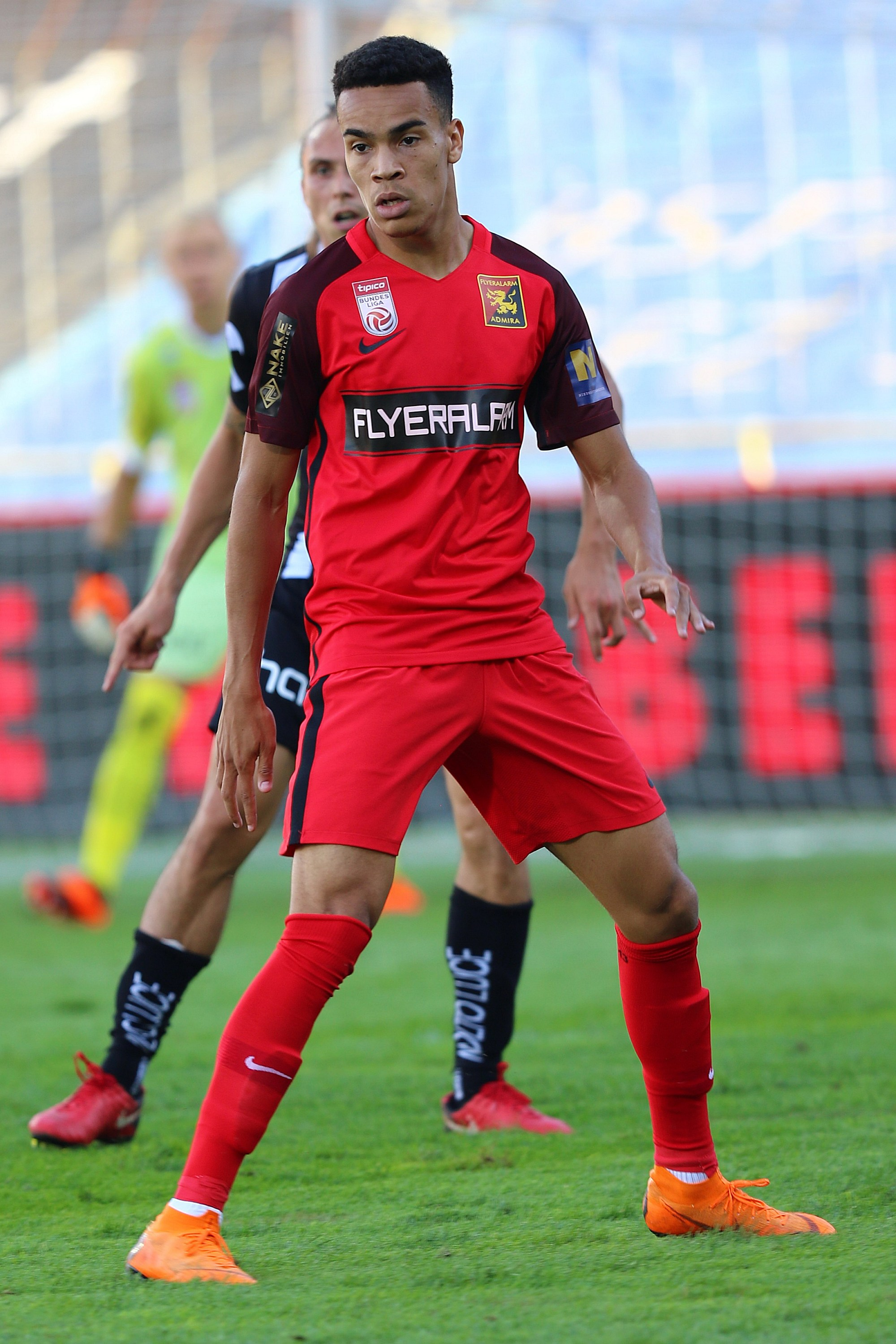
Soiri with Admira Wacker in 2018

=== Esbjerg ===
Esbjerg fB in Danish Superliga announced on 18 June 2019, that they had signed Soiri on a contract until June 2022. However, after 54 appearances and five goals, the spell was cut short, when he got his contract terminated by mutual agreement on 25 August 2021.

=== HJK ===
On 4 October 2021, he signed a two-year contract with HJK Helsinki, beginning in the 2022 season. He represented HJK in the 2022–23 UEFA Europa League and the 2023–24 UEFA Europa Conference League group phases.

=== Universitatea Craiova ===
On 28 December 2023, Romanian Liga I club Universitatea Craiova announced the signing of Soiri on a two-and-a-half-year deal, on a free transfer. He left the club next summer, having made seven appearances in total.

=== Athens Kallithea ===
On 4 July 2024, Soiri joined a newly promoted Super League Greece club Athens Kallithea for an undisclosed fee, which was reported to be in six figures. He scored his first goal in the Greek league on 18 January 2025, in a 2–0 home win against Volos. During the season, Soiri made 32 appearances in the league, scoring three goals, but couldn't help his team from relegating.

== International career ==
On 6 October 2017, Soiri made his debut for Finland's senior national team in a qualifying match for the 2018 World Cup against Croatia. Brought on as a substitute late in the match, he scored the equalising goal for the 1–1 draw in the 90th minute. Soiri was called up for the UEFA Euro 2020 pre-tournament friendly match against Sweden on 29 May 2021. In UEFA Euro 2020 Group B he gained one cap for Finland on 16 June 2021 in a match against Russia when he replaced Jukka Raitala as a substitute on 75th minute of the match. Soiri made his international debut for Finland in November 2017 and has since had over 30 caps. He appeared in 9 out of 10 of Finland's UEFA Euro 2020 qualification matches and thus helped Finland reach their first ever major tournament, the UEFA Euro 2020.

== Personal life ==
Soiri is in a relationship with Sara Sieppi, a Finnish social media personality and a former Miss Finland of 2011. Their dating was first revealed in June 2022.

== Career statistics ==
=== Club ===
As of 22 May 2025

Appearances and goals by club, season and competition
Club	Season	League			Cup (Note: Includes Suomen Cup, Belarusian Cup, Danish Cup, Cupa României and Greek Cup)		League cup		Europe		Other		Total	
Club	Season	Division	Apps	Goals	Apps	Goals	Apps	Goals	Apps	Goals	Apps	Goals	Apps	Goals
MYPA	2012	Veikkausliiga	2	0	3	0	4	0	0	0	—		9	0
MYPA	2013	Veikkausliiga	23	1	1	0	3	0	—		—		27	1
MYPA	2014	Veikkausliiga	25	0	1	0	4	0	4 (Note: Appearances in the UEFA Europa League)	0	—		34	0
MYPA	Total		50	1	5	0	11	0	4	0	—		70	1
JäPS (loan)	2012	Kakkonen	2	0	0	0	—		—		—		2	0
KTP (loan)	2012	Kakkonen	12	2	0	0	—		—		—		12	2
VPS	2015	Veikkausliiga	32	4	1	0	2	0	2	0	—		37	4
VPS	2016	Veikkausliiga	30	10	2	1	4	0	—		—		36	11
VPS	Total		62	14	3	1	6	0	2	0	—		73	15
Shakhtyor Soligorsk	2017	Belarusian Premier League	22	3	7	2	—		1	0	—		30	5
Shakhtyor Soligorsk	2018	Belarusian Premier League	4	0	1	3	—		2	0	—		7	3
Shakhtyor Soligorsk	Total		26	3	8	5	0	0	3	0	—		37	8
Admira Wacker	2018–19	Austrian Bundesliga	12	2	—		—		—		—		12	2
Esbjerg	2019–20	Danish Superliga	24	1	1	0	—		2	0	—		27	1
Esbjerg	2020–21	Danish 1st Division	26	3	0	0	—		—		—		26	3
Esbjerg	Total		50	4	1	0	0	0	2	0	—		53	4
HJK	2022	Veikkausliiga	15	1	1	0	0	0	13 (Note: Appearances in the UEFA Champions League and UEFA Europa League)	0	—		29	1
HJK	2023	Veikkausliiga	22	2	0	0	5	1	13 (Note: Appearances in the UEFA Champions League, UEFA Europa League and UEFA Europa Conference League)	0	—		40	3
HJK	Total		37	3	1	0	5	1	26	0	—		69	4
Klubi 04	2022	Kakkonen	1	1	—		—		—		—		1	1
Universitatea Craiova	2023–24	Liga I	5	0	1	0	—		—		1 (Note: Appearance in Liga I play-offs for UEFA Europa Conference League)	0	7	0
Athens Kallithea	2024–25	Super League Greece	32	3	2	0	—		—		—		34	3
Career total			288	32	21	6	22	1	37	0	1	0	369	39

=== International ===
As of match played on 4 June 2024.

National team	Year	Competitive		Friendly		Total	
National team	Year	Apps	Goals	Apps	Goals	Apps	Goals
Finland	2017	2	1	1	1	3	2
Finland	2018	5	1	5	1	10	2
Finland	2019	9	1	0	0	9	1
Finland	2020	5	0	1	0	6	0
Finland	2021	2	0	4	0	6	0
Finland	2022	1	0	1	0	2	0
Finland	2023	5	2	2	0	7	2
Finland	2024	0	0	2	0	2	0
Total		30	5	15	2	45	7

=== International goals ===
As of match played on 20 November 2023. Scores and results list Finland's goal tally first.

No	Date	Venue	Opponent	Score	Result	Competition
1.	6 October 2017	Stadion Rujevica, Rijeka, Croatia	Croatia	1–1	1–1	2018 FIFA World Cup qualification
2.	9 November 2017	Telia 5G -areena, Helsinki, Finland	Estonia	1–0	3–0	Friendly
3.	26 March 2018	Gloria Golf Resort Pitch A, Belek, Turkey	Malta	5–0	5–0	Friendly
4.	15 October 2018	Tampere Stadium, Tampere, Finland	Greece	1–0	2–0	2018–19 UEFA Nations League C
5.	26 March 2019	Vazgen Sargsyan Republican Stadium, Yerevan, Armenia	Armenia	2–0	2–0	UEFA Euro 2020 qualification
6.	20 November 2023	Stadio Olimpico de Serravalle, Serravalle, San Marino	San Marino	1–0	2–1	UEFA Euro 2024 qualification
7.	20 November 2023	Stadio Olimpico de Serravalle, Serravalle, San Marino	San Marino	2–0	2–1	UEFA Euro 2024 qualification

== Honours ==
Shakhtyor Soligorsk

- Belarusian Cup runner-up: 2016–17

HJK

- Veikkausliiga: 2022, 2023
- Finnish League Cup: 2023

Individual

- Veikkausliiga Player of the Month: July 2016
