= Therése Sjömander Magnusson =

Director of the Nordic Africa Institute

Therése Sjömander
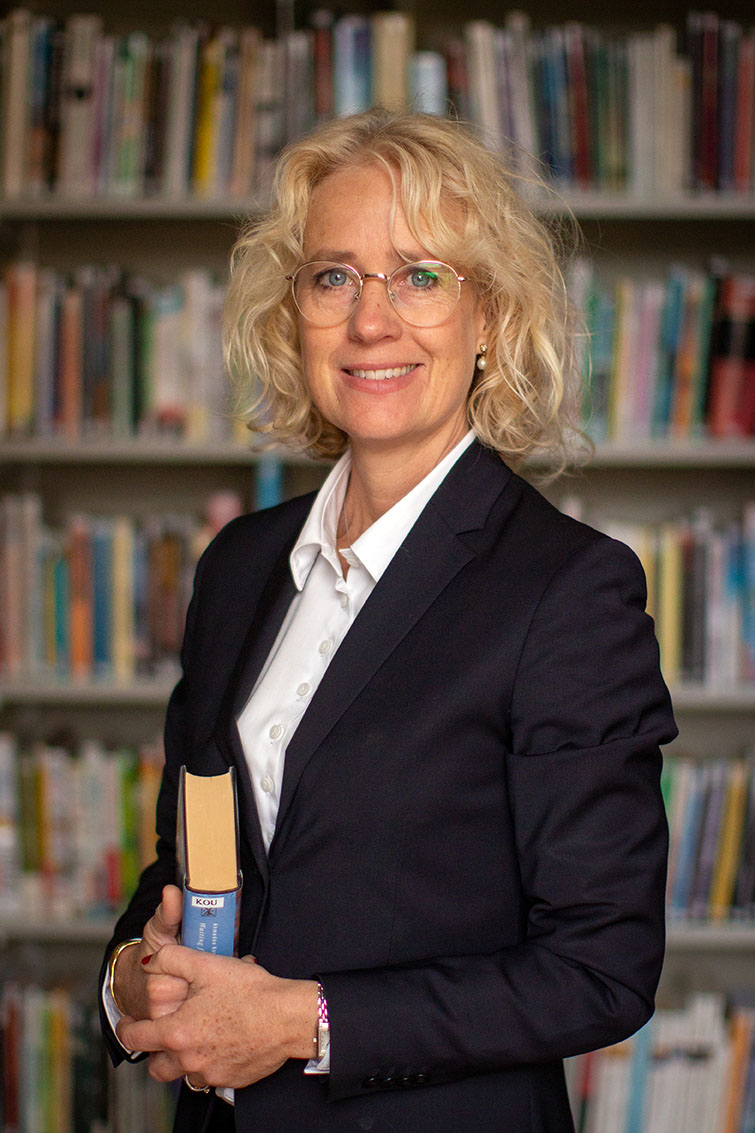
- Therése Sjömander, Director of the Nordic Africa Institute (NAI). (Photo by Mattias Sköld, NAI.)
- Born: 9 April 1970 (age 56)
- Education: University of Linköping

Therése Sjömander (formerly Therése Sjömander Magnusson) is a Swedish water researcher and, since 2019, Director of the Nordic Africa Institute (NAI).

== Biography ==
Therése Sjömander has a PhD in water resources management from Linköping University in Sweden and many years' experience of development assistance to developing countries. On 18 July 2019, the Swedish government appointed her as new Director of the Nordic Africa Institute, a position which she has taken up on 1 October 2019.

Therése Sjömander has previously worked at Stockholm International Water Institute, and as head of UNESCO's first research centre in Sweden.
