= Patrick Chabal =

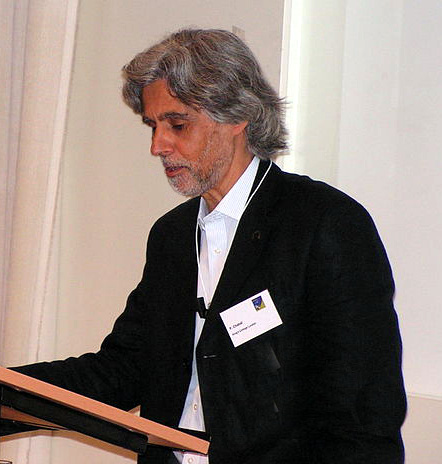
- Chabal at ECAS Leiden, 2007
- Born: 29 April 1951; Taroudant, Morocco
- Died: 16 January 2014 (aged 62)
- Education: Harvard University (B.A.), Columbia University (M.A.), Cambridge University (PhD)
- Known for: Amílcar Cabral. Revolutionary leadership and people's war (Cambridge, 1983)
- Scientific career
- Fields: History of Africa, Political science
- Workplaces: King's College London

Patrick Chabal (29 April 1951 – 16 January 2014) was an Africanist of the late 20th and early 21st century. He had a long academic career. Patrick Chabal's latest position was Chair in African History & Politics at King's College London. He published numerous books, book chapters and articles about Africa. He was one of the founders of AEGIS (Africa-Europe Group for Interdisciplinary Studies) and was a board member for many years.

== Major publications ==
- Chabal, Patrick (1983). Amílcar Cabral. Revolutionary leadership and people's war. African Studies Volume 37. Cambridge: Cambridge University Press. ISBN 9780521249447. ISSN 0065-406X. OCLC 1158772727.
- with Jean-Pascal Daloz:
  - Chabal, Patrick; Daloz, Jean-Pascal (2010) [1999]. Africa works: disorder as political instrument (10th ed.). Oxford: Currey. ISBN 9780253212870. OCLC 643212358.
  - Chabal, Patrick; Daloz, Jean-Pascal (2006). Culture Troubles: politics and the interpretation of meaning. London and Chicago: Hurst and University of Chicago Press. ISBN 9781850657804. OCLC 1405653718.
- Chabal, Patrick; Engel, Ulf; de Haan, Leo, eds. (2007). African Alternatives. Leiden: Brill. ISBN 9789004161139.
- Chabal, Patrick (2009). Africa: the politics of suffering and smiling. London: Zed Books. OCLC 941591685.
- Chabal, Patrick (2012). The end of Conceit: Western Rationality after Postcolonialism. London: Zed Books. ISBN 9781780323879. OCLC 809769256.

== Quote from Africa Works: disorder as political instrument (1999) ==
Our (admittedly far from cheering) conclusion is that there prevails in Africa a system of politics inimical to development as it is usually understood in the West. The dynamics of the political instrumentalization of disorder are such as to limit the scope for reform in at least two ways. The first is that, where disorder has become a resource, there is no incentive to work for a more institutionalized ordering of society. The second is that in the absence of any viable way of obtaining the means needed to sustain neo-patrimonialism, there is inevitably a tendency to link politics to realms of increased disorder, be it war or crime. There is therefore an inbuilt bias in favour of greater disorder and against the formation of the Western-style legal, administrative and institutional foundations required for development.

— Patrick Chabal and Jean-Pascal Daloz, Africa Works: disorder as political instrument (1999), Oxford: James Currey and Bloomington: Indiana University Press, page 162.
