= Africa-Europe Group for Interdisciplinary Studies =

Research network of European centres on African studies

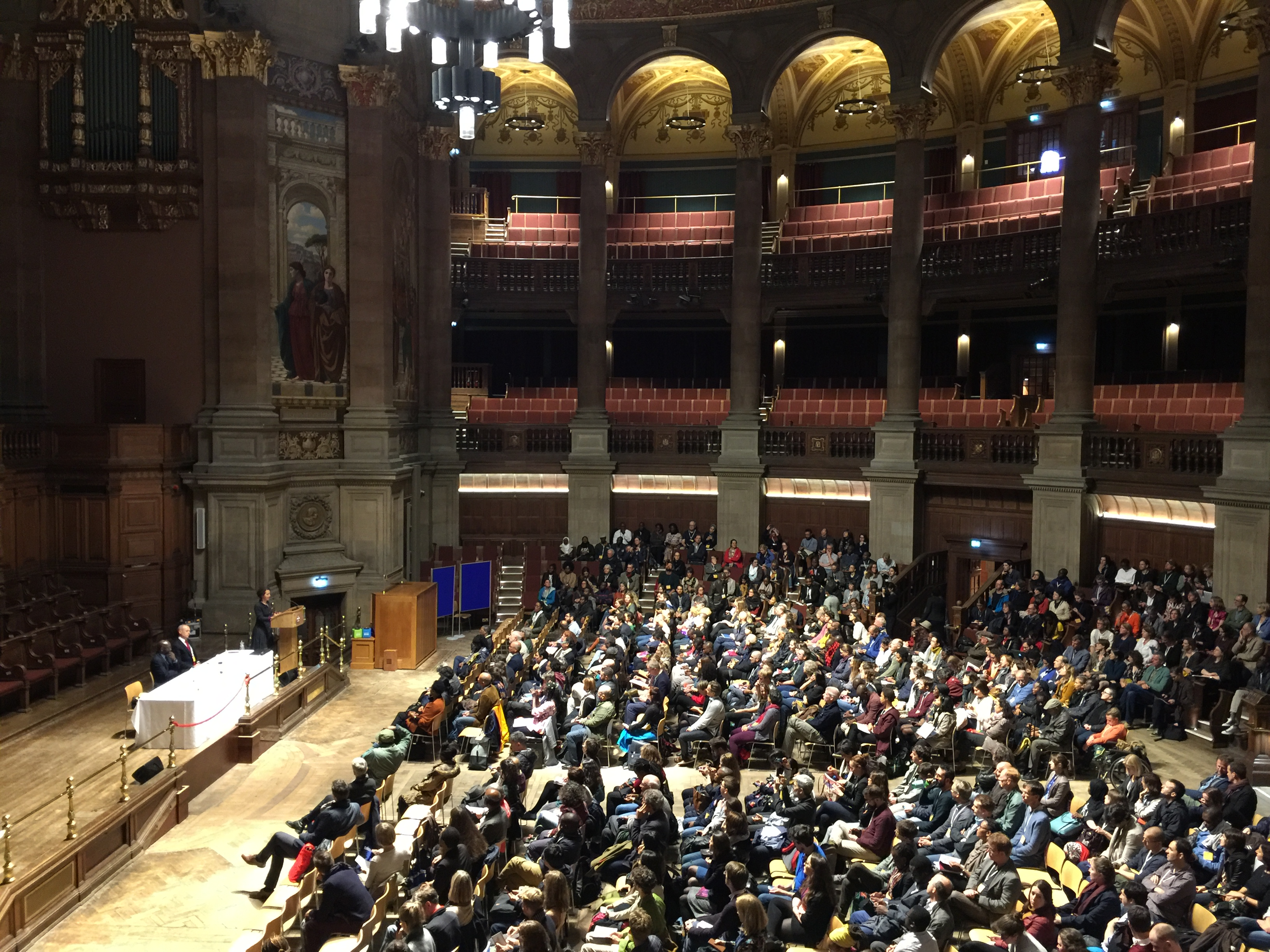
Opening of the ECAS Conference 2019, McEwan Hall, University of Edinburgh. On stage from the left Mamadou Diouf (Columbia University), Thomas Molony (University of Edinburgh) and Amanda Hammar (AEGIS president, Centre of African Studies, Copenhagen).

AEGIS is a research network of European centres on African studies in the fields of social science and humanities. AEGIS' main goal is to improve understanding about contemporary African societies.

== History and organisation ==
AEGIS was founded in 1991 by African studies centres in Bayreuth, Bordeaux, Leiden, London, and Uppsala. Initially an informal grouping of related African Studies' organisations and groups, AEGIS would formalise in 1998 through the adoption of a formal statute. In the same year, it elected its first executive committee, which included Patrick Chabal as chair. In the course of a decade, it developed into a network that included centres from more European countries.

Starting in 1998, international conferences on a variety of thematic areas were organized in different countries. AEGIS continues to host thematic conferences (not to be confused with the ECAS gatherings, detailed below).

AEGIS organises itself into small thematic groups (also called Collaborative Research Groups, or CRGS), focusing on specific subjects within the field of African Studies. Examples include 'CRG Africa in the Indian Ocean', 'CRG African Borderlands Research Network' and 'CRG African Migration, Mobility and Displacement (AMMODI)'.

The current board consists of AEGIS President and Professor Amanda Hammar (CAS Copenhagen), Dr. David Ambrosetti (LAM Bordeaux), Professor Michael Bollig (Cologne), Professor Marleen Dekker (Leiden), Dr. Tom Molony (Edinburgh) and Dr. Isabella Soi (Cagliari).

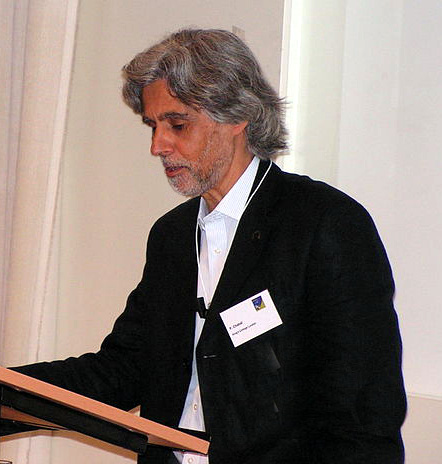
Patrick Chabal, ECAS Conference Leiden 2007

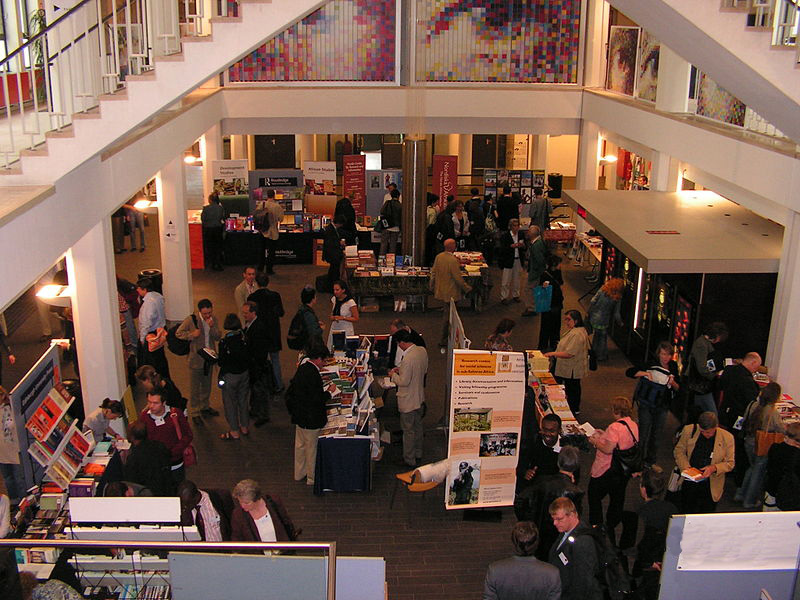
Hall, ECAS Conference Leiden 2007

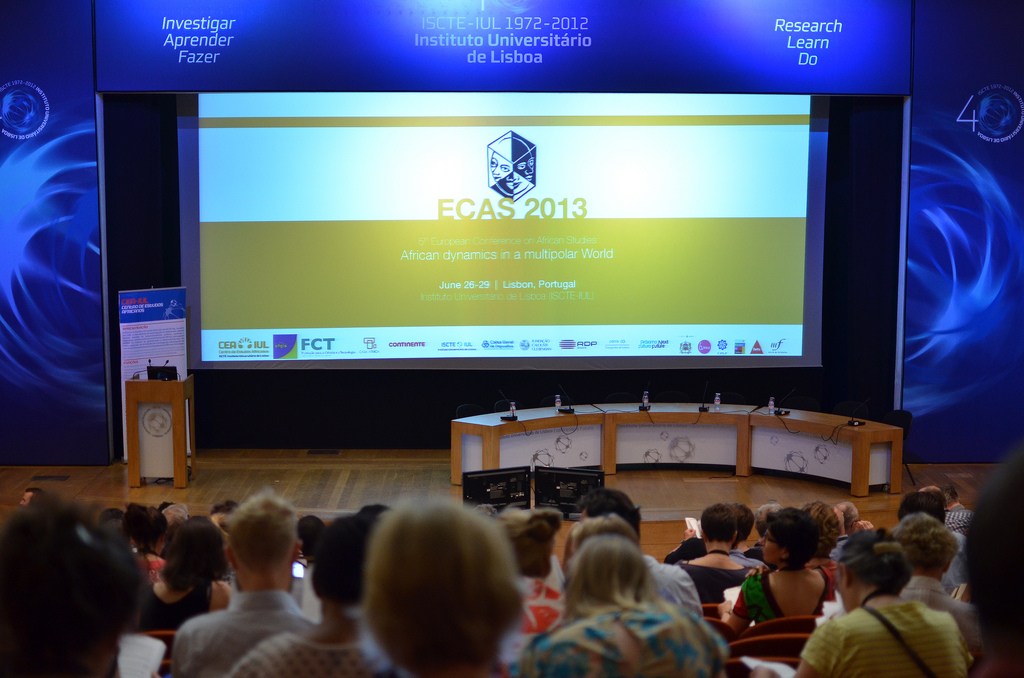
Crowd and stage, ECAS Conference Lisbon 2013

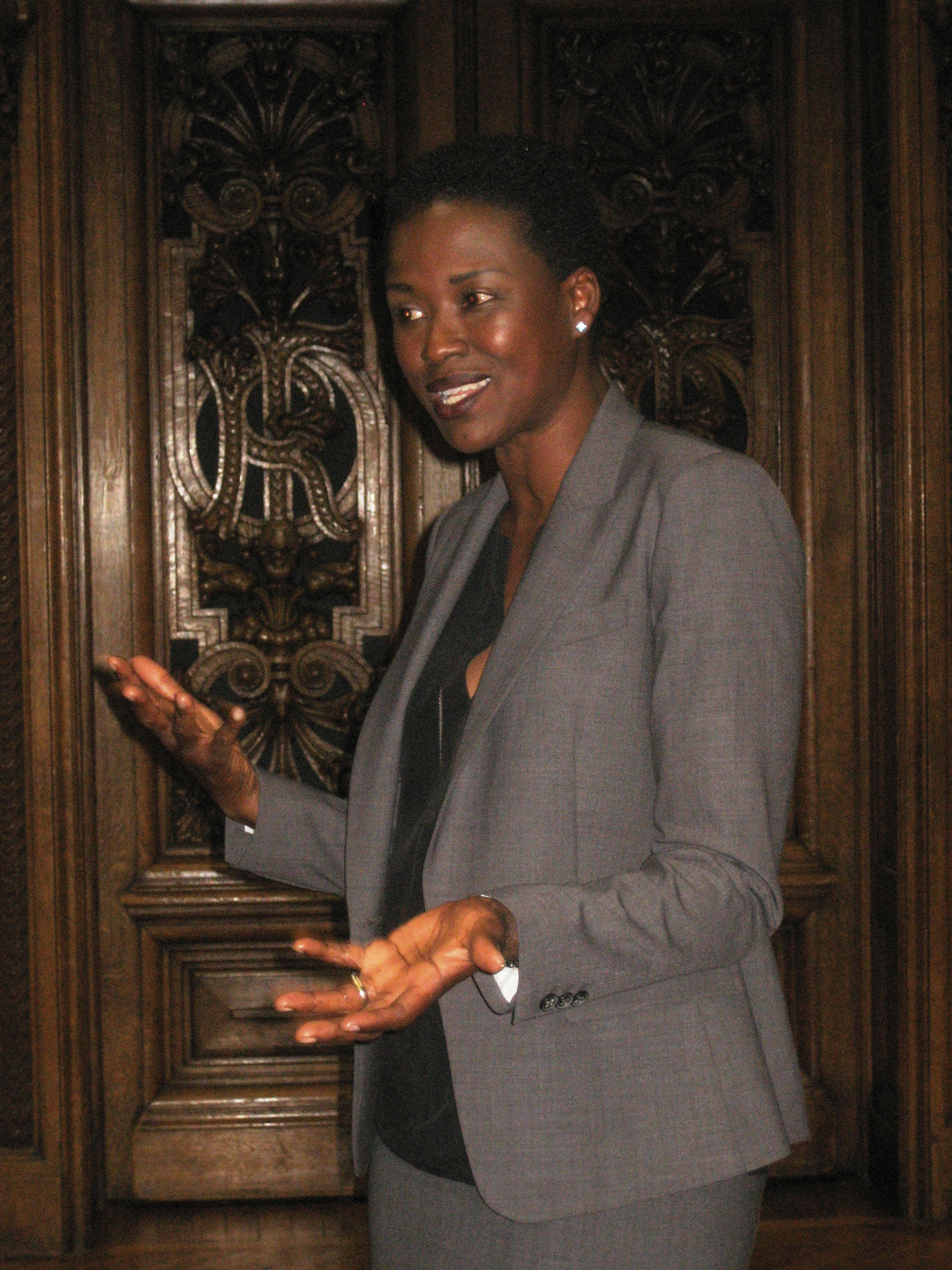
Jemima Pierre, ECAS Conference Paris Sorbonne 2015

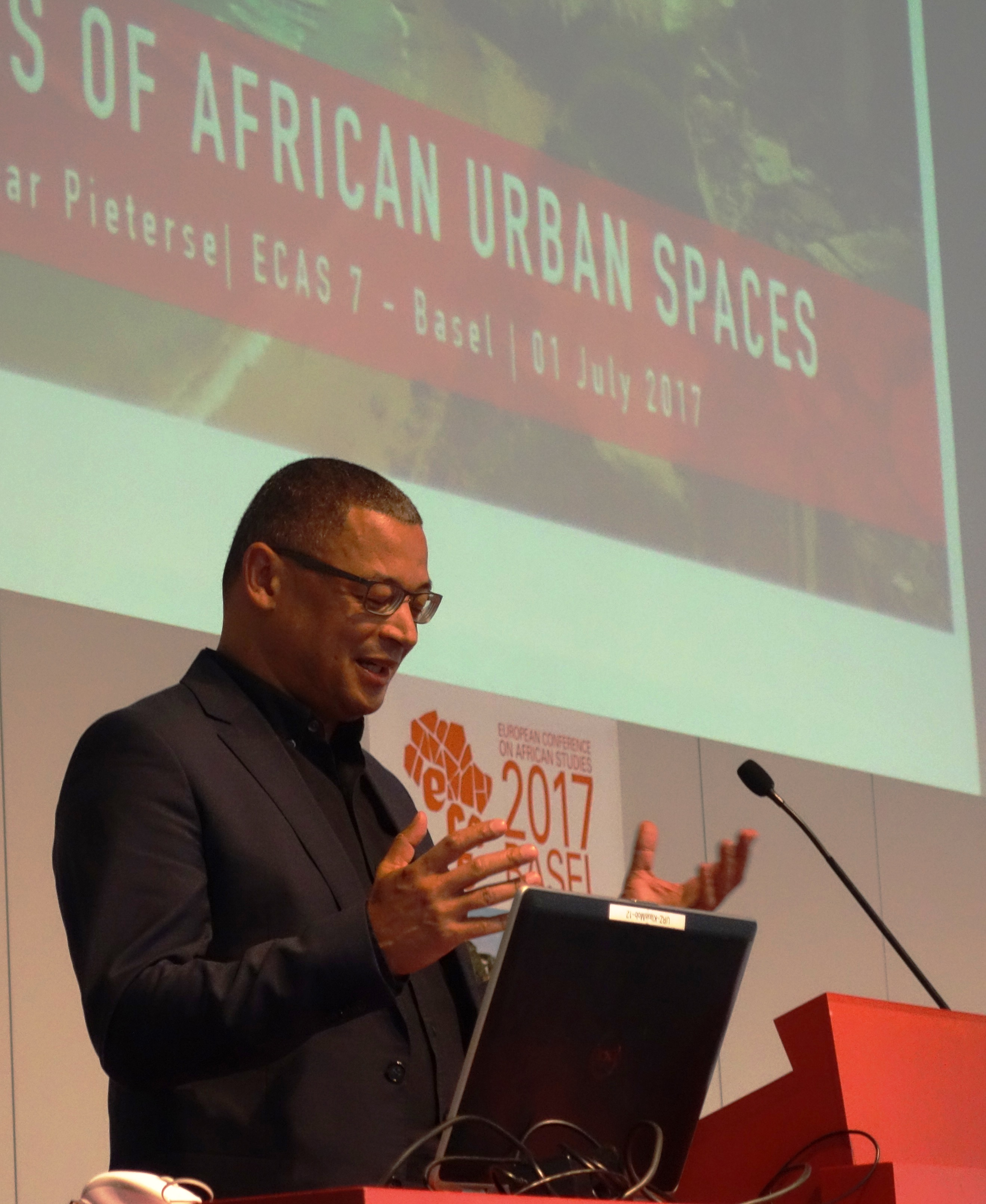
Edgar Pieterse, ECAS Basel 2017

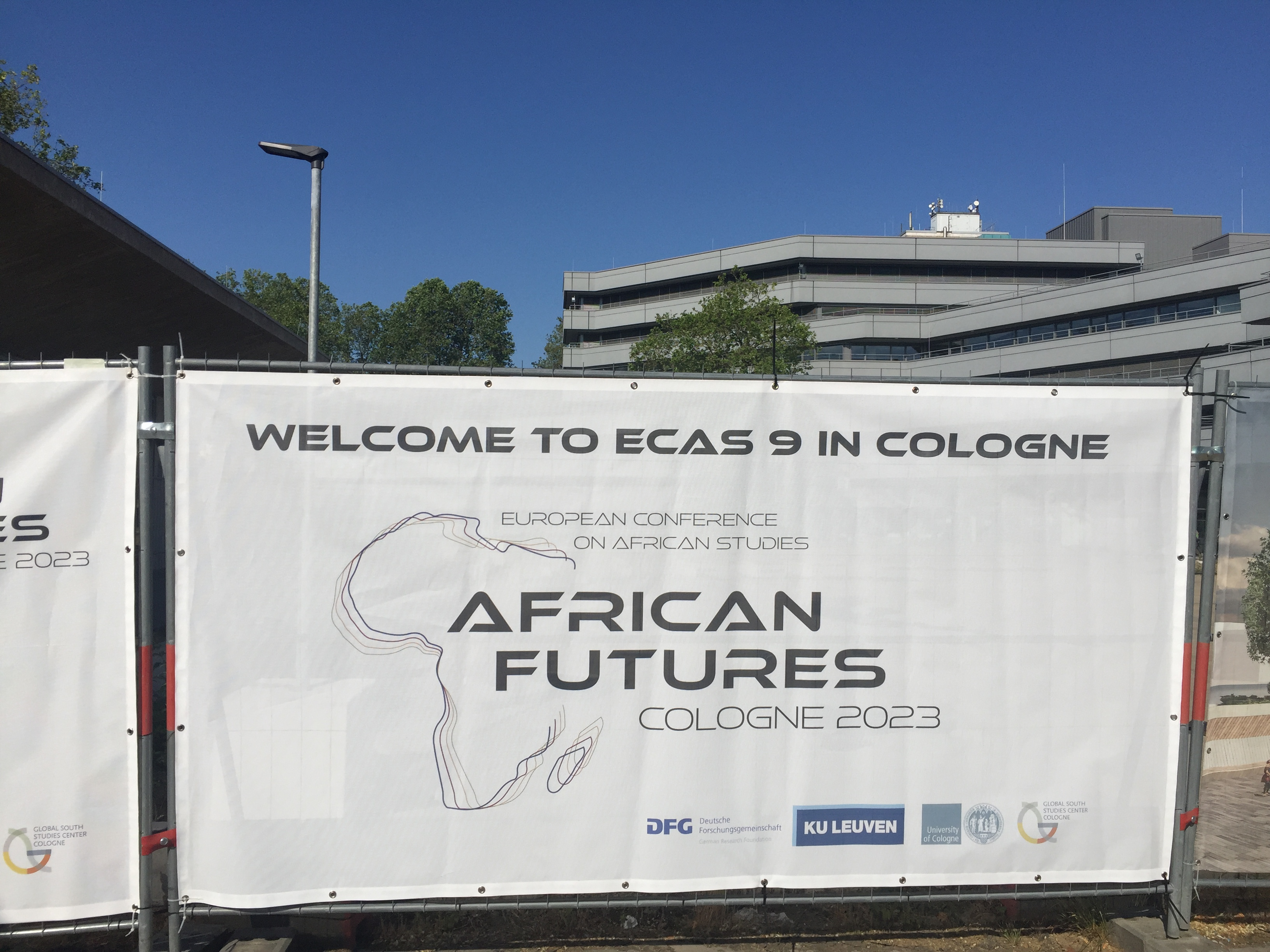
ECAS 2023 in Cologne (Germany)

== European Conferences on African Studies (ECAS) ==
In the new millennium, the organization of European Conferences on African Studies (ECAS), open to everybody, became the central activity. The conferences take place every two years, always in a different country. ECAS 2021, scheduled to be held in Cologne, was postponed to June 2023.

- 2005 : Approaching the post-colonial half century in sub-Saharan Africa, School of Oriental and African Studies (SOAS), London (UK)
- 2007 : African alternatives: initiative and creativity beyond current constraints, African Studies Centre Leiden (Netherlands)
- 2009 : Respacing Africa, Institute of African Studies, University of Leipzig (Germany)
- 2011 : African engagements: on whose terms?, Nordic Africa Institute, Uppsala (Sweden)
- 2013 : African dynamics in a multipolar world, Centro de estudos africanos, Lisbonne (Portugal)
- 2015 : Collective mobilisations in Africa: contestation, resistance, revolt, Institut des mondes africains (IMAF) et Les Afriques dans le monde (LAM), Paris (France)
- 2017 : Urban Africa - urban Africans: New encounters of the rural and the urban, Centre for African Studies Basel, Swiss Society for African Studies, Bâle (Switzerland)
- 2019 : Africa: connections and disruptions, Centre of African Studies, Edinburgh (UK)
- 2021 : no ECAS because of the COVID-19 pandemic
- 2023 : African futures (ECAS9), Global South Studies Center (University of Cologne) & IARA, Institute for Anthropological Research on Africa (University of Leuven).
- 2025 : African, Afropean, Afropolitan, Czech Association for African Studies, Prague.

== See also ==
- African Studies Association - US-based research network focusing on African studies.
- African Studies Association of the United Kingdom - UK-based equivalent.
