= Iina Soiri =

Finnish social scientist

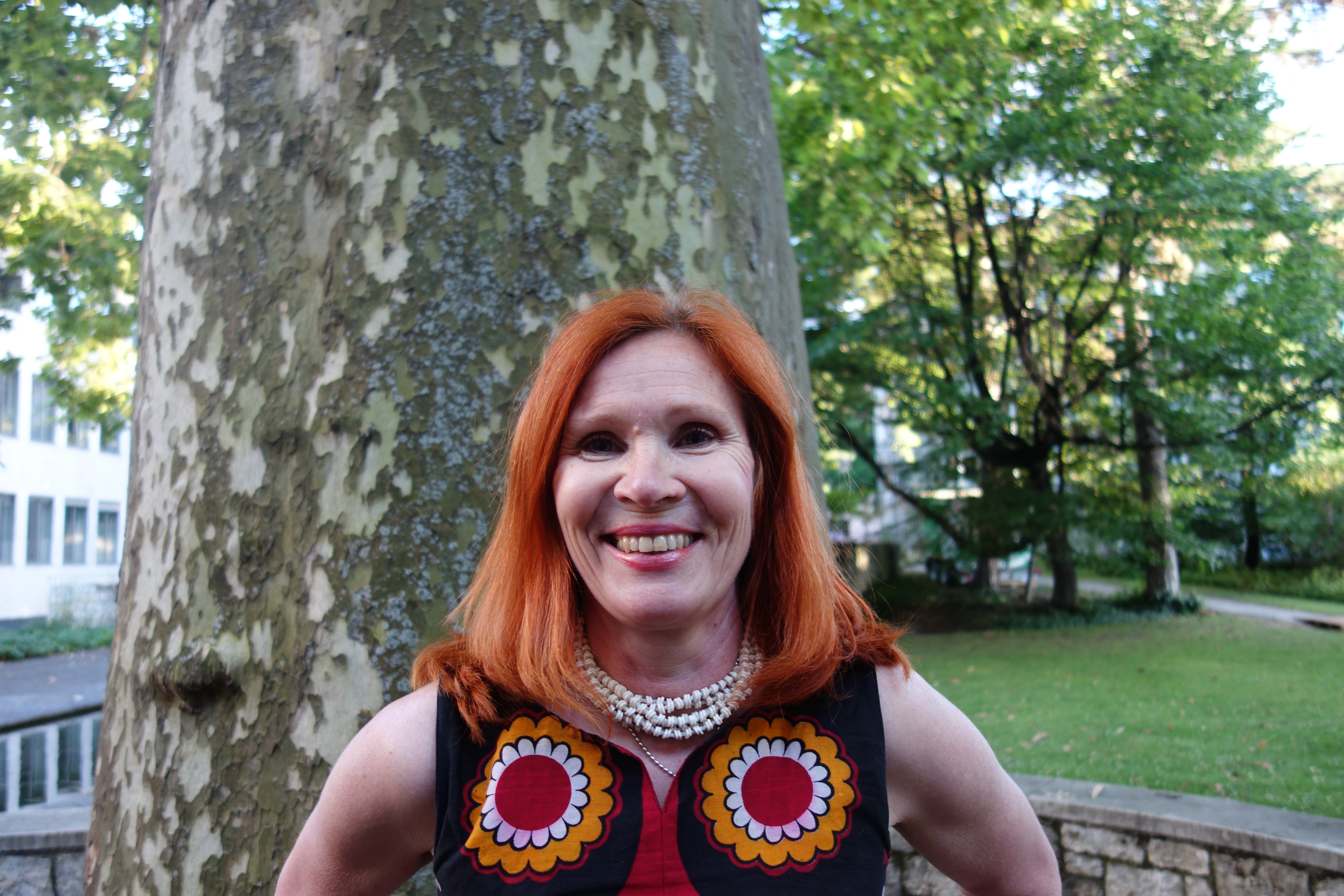
- Soiri (2017)
- Born: 29 August 1964 (age 62)
- Education: University of Helsinki

Iina Kaarina Soiri (born August 29, 1964) is a Finnish social scientist, former director of the Nordic Africa Institute in Uppsala, Sweden.

== Life and work ==
Iina Soiri has a Master of Social Sciences from the University of Helsinki. She has spent 20 years on the African continent, in various countries such as Namibia, Mozambique, Angola and Tanzania, as an activist, diplomat, consultant and researcher working for both civil society organizations and public sector. She worked in the Finnish Ministry of Foreign Affairs in Helsinki as a senior advisor on development policy and served in the Embassy of Finland in Dar es Salaam as a senior expert on governance 2006-2010. She was a research fellow at the Nordic Africa Institute in Uppsala from 1995 to 1996 and was director of the institute from March 2013 until June 2019.

Her son, Pyry Soiri, is a professional footballer. She also has another son, Juri.

== Selected bibliography ==
- Iina Soiri: The radical motherhood: Namibian women's independence struggle, 1996, ISBN 91-7106-380-3
- Pekka Peltola and Iina Soiri: Finland and National Liberation in Southern Africa, 1999, ISBN 91-7106-431-1

Iina Soiri also has published her first fiction book, ”Kun Kaikki Muuttuu Muuksi” (finnish). July, 2025. Soiri & Liisa Laakso published an article on South African vision in the Finnish Institute for International Affairs’(FIIA) book ”Competing Visions for International Order”. November, 2025.

== Sources ==
- About Iina Soiri at the Nordic Africa Institute's website
- About Iina Soiri at the website of the Finnish Ministry of Foreign Affairs
