= Africa Bibliography =

- Discipline: African studies
- Language: English
- Edited by: Terry A. Barringer

Publication details
- History: 1984–present
- Publisher: Cambridge University Press
- Frequency: Annual

Standard abbreviations
- ISO 4: Afr. Bibliogr.

Indexing
- ISSN: 0266-6731 (print); 1757-1642 (web)
- OCLC no.: 1588491

Links
- Journal homepage; Online access; Online archive

Africa Bibliography is an annual guide to works in African studies published by Cambridge University Press on behalf of the International African Institute (IAI). It was established in 1984 and is published as an annual print volume and simultaneously as a searchable online database. The online database consolidates the back volumes of the Africa Bibliography into a single database which can be queried using quick search, Boolean, and faceted search options.

The bibliography is currently compiled by Terry A. Barringer (University of Cambridge) and is prepared alongside the IAI's journal Africa.

During the 2014 meeting of the US African Studies Association Africa Bibliography received the Conover-Porter Award 2014 (best africana bibliography or reference work).
