= Rutgers University Department of African, Middle Eastern, and South Asian Languages and Literatures =

African, Middle Eastern, and South Asian Languages and Literatures
- Location: Piscataway, NJ, New Jersey
- Website: www.amesall.rutgers.edu

The Rutgers University Department of African, Middle Eastern, South Asian Languages and Literatures (AMESALL) is dedicated to the study of Africa, the Middle East, and South Asia. It is the primary academic home of sixteen core faculty and seven part-time lecturers. AMESALL provides instruction in over a dozen languages from these three regions. It offers courses taught in English and regional languages such as Arabic and Hindi, and regularly hosts events such as lectures, workshops, and conferences for the student body, the faculty, and the general public.

Rutgers students can enroll in an undergraduate major program of study (with separate regional and comparative options), an undergraduate minor, and a post-baccalaureate Translation Certificate program, which is also open to non-matriculated students.

The AMESALL Department is located in Lucy Stone Hall on the Livingston Campus in Piscataway, NJ, part of Rutgers-New Brunswick campus.

== Programs of Study ==
AMESALL currently offers 2 Major and 4 Minor programs:

Major Programs include the Regional Option and the Comparative Option. Both options require at least 6 credits in upper level language courses within the department. They also both require additional credits in literature, sociolinguistics and linguistics, with the Regional Option requiring 18 credits and the Comparative Option requiring 12 credits.

== Language offerings ==
AMESALL regularly provides several years of instruction in about a dozen languages of Africa, the Middle East, and South Asia, including:

- Arabic, including Classical Arabic, Egyptian Arabic, and Modern Standard Arabic
- Hebrew is taught by the Rutgers University Jewish Studies Department, but individual sections are also offered through AMESALL.
- Hindi
- Persian
- Swahili
- Turkish
- Twi
- Yoruba
- Other languages, including Urdu, Aramaic, Bengali, Sanskrit, and Syriac are offered at the elementary level and occasionally higher levels of instruction. Multiple levels of Armenian are also available through the Rutgers Armenian Studies Program.
- In 2014, AMESALL added Urdu to the growing list of languages offered by the department, contingent on student interest.

== Faculty ==
AMESALL's core (full-time) faculty includes scholars representing all three regions, their languages, literatures, and cultures:

- Ousseina Alidou, Associate Professor, African Languages and Literatures, Director of the Rutgers University Center for African Studies
- Maryam Borjian, Assistant Professor (NTT), Language Coordinator
- Charles G. Häberl, Associate Professor, Chair of African, Middle Eastern, South Asian Languages and Literatures
- Hanan Kashou, Assistant Professor (NTT), Arabic Language
- Yasmine Khayyat, Assistant Professor, Middle Eastern Languages and Literatures
- Benjamin Koerber, Assistant Professor, Middle Eastern Languages and Literatures
- Moses Mabayoje, Full Time Lecturer, Yoruba
- Preetha Mani, Assistant Professor, South Asian Languages and Literatures
- Alamin Mazrui, Full Professor, African Languages and Literatures
- Anjali Nerlekar, Assistant Professor, South Asian Languages and Literatures
- Shaheen Parveen, Full Time Lecturer, Hindi
- Samah Selim, Associate Professor, Middle Eastern Languages and Literatures
- Meheli Sen, Assistant Professor, South Asian Languages and Literatures and Cinema Studies
- Paul Sprachman, Assistant Professor (NTT), Persian
- Ferhan Tunagur, Full Time Lecturer, Turkish
