= Philippe Vigier (historian) =

French historian (1924–1995)

Philippe Henri Maxime Vigier (French pronunciation: [filip ɑ̃ʁi maksim viʒje]; 8 June 1924, Paris – 15 March 1995, Paris) was a 20th-century French historian, specialist of the French Second Republic.

== Selected works ==
- 1963: La Seconde République dans la région alpine, Paris, Presses universitaires de France, 2 vol.
- 1976: La Monarchie de Juillet, Paris, Presses universitaires de France, coll. Que sais-je?, 127 p.
- 1982: La Vie quotidienne en province et à Paris pendant les journées de 1848, Paris, Hachette, 443 p.
- 2001: La Seconde République, Paris, Presses universitaires de France, coll. Que sais-je?, 127 p.
