= Nordic Africa Institute =

Research institute in Uppsala, Sweden

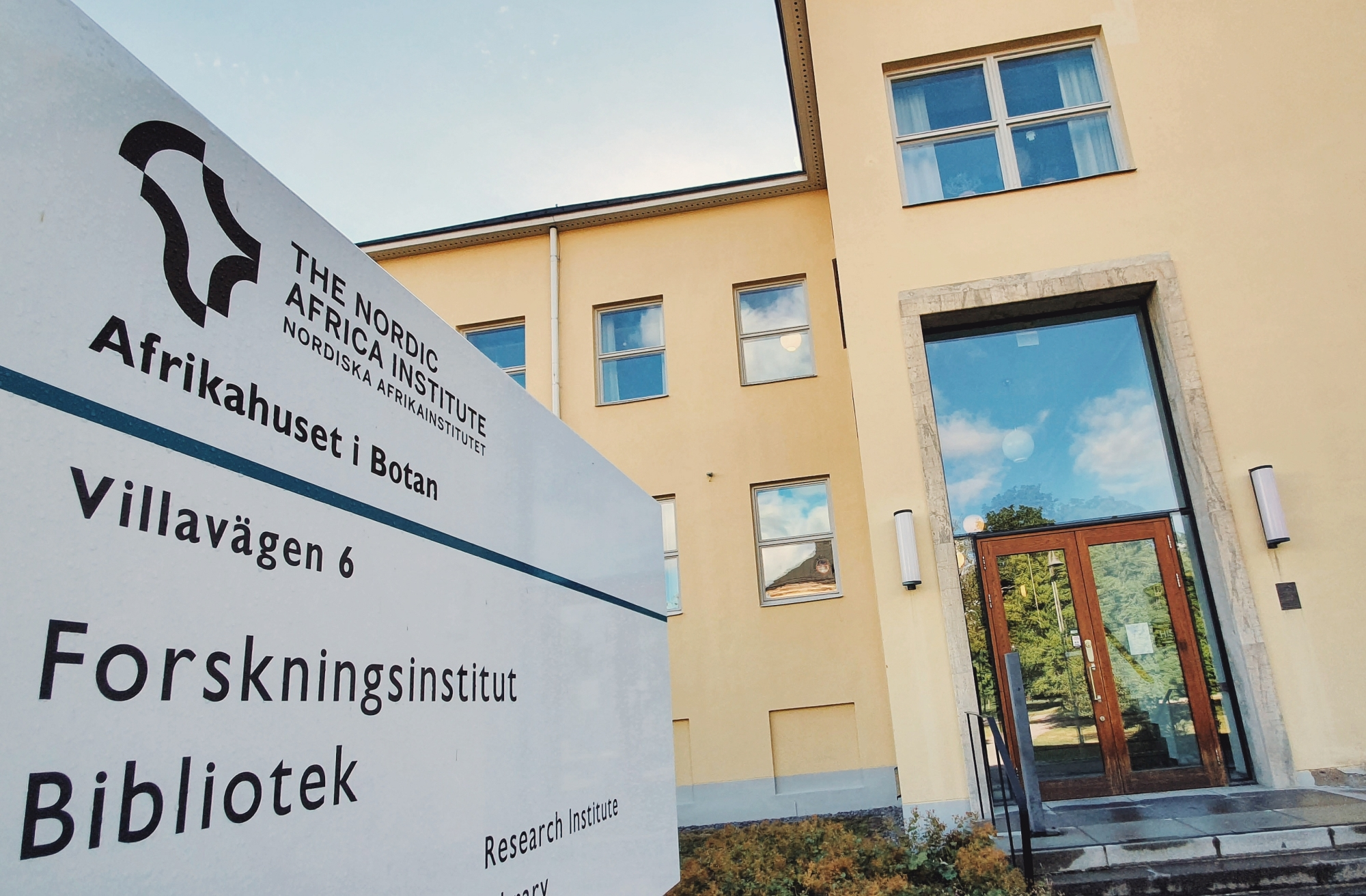
- Abbreviation: NAI
- Location: Uppsala, Sweden
- Leader: Therése Sjömander Magnusson
- Affiliations: AEGIS (African Studies)
- Website: http://www.nai.uu.se

Nordic Africa Institute (NAI) (Swedish: Nordiska Afrikainstitutet) serves as a research, documentation and information centre on modern Africa for the Nordic countries. The Institute conducts independent, policyrelevant research, provides analysis and informs decisionmaking, with the aim of advancing research-based knowledge of contemporary Africa.

The Nordic Africa Institute was founded in 1962 and is financed jointly by Sweden, Finland, Denmark and Iceland. Norway was also a member of the original group of founding and funding partner countries, but backed out in 2015. Administratively, the institute functions as a Swedish government agency that answers to the Ministry for Foreign Affairs. It is located in Uppsala, Sweden.

The Nordic Africa Institute is part of AEGIS, a network of African Studies Centres in Europe, and organized its 4th international conference (ECAS) in 2011. The institute is headed by a Director, and a Programme and Research Council has the task of monitoring and advising the Director. On 18 July 2019, the Swedish government appointed Therése Sjömander Magnusson as new Director of NAI, a position which she took up on 1 October 2019.

== Previous Directors of NAI ==
The list is partly based on a report to the Nordic Africa Institute's 50th Anniversary in 2012.

- Iina Soiri 2013-2019
- Carin Norberg 2005-2013
- Lennart Wohlgemuth 1993-2005
- Anders Hjort af Ornäs 1984-1993
- Carl Gösta Widstrand 1962-1984

== See also ==
- Government agencies in Sweden.
