= Les Afriques dans le monde =

French research unit for the Africas

Coordinates: 44°48′24″N 0°37′52″W

Les Afriques dans le monde (LAM)
- Location within France Location within Europe
- Predecessor: Centre d’étude d’Afrique noire (CEAN, University of Bordeaux) and the Centre d’étude et de recherche sur les pays de l’Afrique orientale (CREPAO, University of Pau and the Adour Region)
- Formation: 2011
- Headquarters: Pessac, a suburb of Bordeaux, France
- Director: David Ambrosetti
- Website: https://www.lam.sciencespobordeaux.fr/

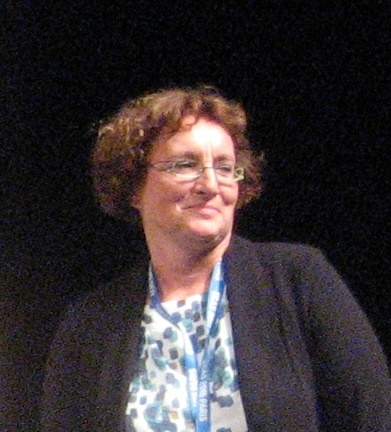
French Africanist Céline Thiriot was head of Les Afriques dans le monde in 2012-2017, photo 2015.

Les Afriques dans le monde (LAM) is a French academic research institute in Pessac, France focusing on Africa and its diaspora.

It is a collaboration of the national research organisation CNRS (Centre national de la recherche scientifique) and three local universities: the Political science institute of the University of Bordeaux, the Bordeaux Montaigne University) and the University of Pau and the Adour Region. LAM was founded in 2011 by merging the Centre d’étude d’Afrique noire (CEAN, University of Bordeaux) and the Centre d’étude et de recherche sur les pays de l’Afrique orientale (CREPAO, University of Pau and the Adour Region) with other researchers joining.

The research field of LAM is the "Africas": Sub-Saharan Africa, North Africa and by extension the African diaspora in the Middle East and transatlantic regions, mainly the Caribbean. In 2022 LAM had 26 researchers, fifty-odd PhD students and some 100 associated researchers. Since 2021 it is headed by David Ambrosetti.

== Research ==
Five research themes are addressed by LAM :

1. State, regulations and contestations in the Africas
2. Spaces, (im)mobilities, diasporas
3. Imagination, arts, subjectivities
4. Markets and entrepreneurship in Africa
5. Health risks, agrarian crises and environmental challenges

== Collaborations ==
LAM is a member of the Africa-Europe Group for Interdisciplinary Studies (AEGIS), a European academic research network for African studies, of which LAM's precursor institute the Centre d’étude d’Afrique noire (CEAN, Bordeaux) was among the founders.

Within France LAM participates in the multidisciplinary research group Études africaines en France (African studies in France) of the Centre national de la recherche scientifique (CNRS).

LAM organised annual meetings of Africanists in France, such the 3e Journées du Réseau des études africaines (REAf) at Bordeaux in 2014, the 6th European Conferences on African Studies (ECAS 2015) in Paris and the 7e Rencontres des Études Africaines en France (7e REAf and 6e JCEA) at Toulouse in 2022 (JCEA : Rencontres des Jeunes Chercheur·e·s en Études Africaines).

== Journals of LAM ==
LAM supports the academic journals Afrilex, Cahiers d’Outre-Mer, Études littéraires africaines, Politique africaine in collaboration with the Paris Institut des mondes africains (IMAF) and Revue Sources.
