= Institut des mondes africains =

French research unit

Coordinates: 48°48′50″N 2°23′15″E

Institut des mondes africains (IMAF)
- Location within France Location within Europe
- Formation: 1 January 2014
- Merger of: Centre d’études des mondes africains (CEMAf), Centre d’études africaines (CEAf) and Centre d’histoire sociale de l’islam méditerranéen (CHSIM)
- Type: French National Centre for Scientific Research (CNRS), Institut de recherche pour le développement (IRD), École pratique des hautes études (EPHE), École des hautes études en sciences sociales (EHESS), Paris 1 Panthéon-Sorbonne University, Aix-Marseille University
- Purpose: African studies, Anthropology, Archeology, History, Political science
- Headquarters: Ivry-sur-Seine, France
- Coordinates: 48°48'49.612"N, 2°23'15.079"E
- Official language: French
- Director: Elena Vezzadini and Anne Doquet
- Website: https://www.ehess.fr/fr/institut-mondes-africains-imaf

The Institut des mondes africains (IMAF) is a French academic mixed and interdisciplinary research unit for African studies, in which the national research organisation CNRS (Centre national de la recherche scientifique), three other French national academic research institutions and two universities collaborate. They are the Institut de recherche pour le développement (IRD, French Research Institute for Development), the École pratique des hautes études (EPHE), the École des hautes études en sciences sociales (EHESS, School for Advanced Studies in the Social Sciences) and the Aix-Marseille University and the Pantheon-Sorbonne University.

IMAF was founded on January 1, 2014 by merging three research centres: the Centre d'études des mondes africains (CEMAf), the Centre d'études africaines (CEAf) and the Centre d’histoire sociale de l’islam méditerranéen (CHSIM). The institute is located both at the Campus Condorcet Paris-Aubervilliers in Aubervilliers and at Maison méditerranéenne des sciences de l'homme (MMSH) of Aix-Marseille University in Aix-en-Provence.

== Research areas ==
1. The creation and circulation of knowledge
2. The long history of political economies and globalization in Africa
3. Power, space, time and uses of the past
4. Religious spaces: Genealogies, textualities, materialities
5. Art as a political object
6. Gender, bodies, subjectivities.

== IMAF academic journals ==
IMAF is involved in several academic journals:

- Afriques. Débats, méthodes et terrains d’histoire, online journal.
- Anthropologie et développement, formerly Bulletin de l'APAD, published by the Association euro-africaine pour l'anthropologie du changement social et du développement (APAD). online at revue.org
- Cahiers d'études africaines, founded in 1960.
- Politique africaine, in collaboration with the institute Les Afriques dans le monde (LAM, Bordeaux), published by Éditions Karthala.

== Collaborations ==
IMAF is a member of the Africa-Europe Group for Interdisciplinary Studies (AEGIS), a European academic research network for African studies. Within France IMAF participates in the multidisciplinary research group Études africaines en France (African studies in France) of the Centre national de la recherche scientifique (CNRS) and houses its secretariat. IMAF co-organised biannual meetings of Africanists in France, such the 3e Journées du Réseau des études africaines (REAf) at Bordeaux in 2014, the 6th European Conferences on African Studies (ECAS 2015) in Paris and the 7e Rencontres des Études Africaines en France (7e REAf and 6e JCEA) at Toulouse in 2022 (JCEA : Rencontres des Jeunes Chercheur·e·s en Études Africaines).

== Libraries ==
The Bibliothèque de recherches africaines (BRA) has been transferred to the library Grand équipement documentaire (GED ) of the Campus Condorcet in Paris. The library of the Centre d'études africaines (CEAf), founded in 1957 and containing about 25.000 monographies and more than 500 academic journals, has been subsumed by the Paris Bibliothèque universitaire des langues et civilisations (BULAC) in 2011. At Aix-en-Provence the old library of the Institut d'études africaines has been integrated into the Multimedia library of the Maison méditerranéenne des sciences de l'homme (MMSH).
