= List of Guggenheim Fellowships awarded in 2022 =

List of Guggenheim Fellowships awarded in 2022:

| Fellow | Category | Field of Study |
|---|---|---|
| Olufemi O. Vaughan | Humanities | African Studies |
| Heather Clark | Humanities | American Literature |
| Michael J. Hathaway | Social Sciences | Anthropology and Cultural Studies |
| Rosalind C. Morris | Social Sciences | Anthropology and Cultural Studies |
| Lek-Heng Lim | Natural Sciences | Applied Mathematics |
| Daniel A. Barber | Humanities | Architecture, Planning, and Design |
| Mario Carpo | Humanities | Architecture, Planning, and Design |
| Emily Levesque | Natural Sciences | Astronomy – Astrophysics |
| Krzysztof Z. Stanek | Natural Sciences | Astronomy – Astrophysics |
| Yanqin Wu | Natural Sciences | Astronomy – Astrophysics |
| Peter Filkins | Creative Arts | Biography |
| Manyuan Long | Natural Sciences | Biology |
| Anne Stone | Natural Sciences | Biology |
| John Wallingford | Natural Sciences | Biology |
| So Hirata | Natural Sciences | Chemistry |
| Prashant K. Jain | Natural Sciences | Chemistry |
| Shana Kelley | Natural Sciences | Chemistry |
| Gary Abbott | Creative Arts | Choreography |
| Anne Bluethenthal | Creative Arts | Choreography |
| Silvana Cardell | Creative Arts | Choreography |
| Moriah Evans | Creative Arts | Choreography |
| Ishmael Houston-Jones | Creative Arts | Choreography |
| Cynthia Oliver | Creative Arts | Choreography |
| Kim Bowes | Humanities | Classics |
| Shrikanth Narayanan | Natural Sciences | Computer Science |
| Cynthia Rudin | Natural Sciences | Computer Science |
| Kimberly Yuracko | Social Sciences | Constitutional Studies |
| Anthea Kraut | Creative Arts | Dance Studies |
| César Alvarez | Creative Arts | Drama and Performance Art |
| Jibz Cameron | Creative Arts | Drama and Performance Art |
| Jen Silverman | Creative Arts | Drama and Performance Art |
| Michael Gene Sullivan | Creative Arts | Drama and Performance Art |
| Valerie Ann Kivelson | Humanities | Early Modern Studies |
| Toshiro Tanimoto | Natural Sciences | Earth Science |
| Jordan Sand | Humanities | East Asian Studies |
| Nicholas Bloom | Social Sciences | Economics |
| Stefanie Stantcheva | Social Sciences | Economics |
| Marco Amabili | Natural Sciences | Engineering |
| Alexandra Boltasseva | Natural Sciences | Engineering |
| Xin Zhang | Natural Sciences | Engineering |
| Jeffrey Masten | Humanities | English Literature |
| Jordanna Bailkin | Humanities | European and Latin American History |
| Paul W. Werth | Humanities | European and Latin American History |
| Jennifer Croft | Creative Arts | Fiction |
| Hernan Diaz (writer) | Creative Arts | Fiction |
| Brandon Hobson | Creative Arts | Fiction |
| Ladee Hubbard | Creative Arts | Fiction |
| Alexandra Kleeman | Creative Arts | Fiction |
| Rebecca Makkai | Creative Arts | Fiction |
| Dinaw Mengestu | Creative Arts | Fiction |
| Maaza Mengiste | Creative Arts | Fiction |
| C. E. Morgan | Creative Arts | Fiction |
| Lysley Tenorio | Creative Arts | Fiction |
| Beth B | Creative Arts | Film-Video |
| David Finkelstein | Creative Arts | Film-Video |
| Moko Fukuyama | Creative Arts | Film-Video |
| Ellie Ga | Creative Arts | Film-Video |
| Ja'Tovia Monique Gary | Creative Arts | Film-Video |
| Terike Haapoja | Creative Arts | Film-Video |
| Autumn Knight | Creative Arts | Film-Video |
| Jenny Lion | Creative Arts | Film-Video |
| Janis Crystal Lipzin | Creative Arts | Film-Video |
| Angelo Madsen Minax | Creative Arts | Film-Video |
| Alison O'Daniel | Creative Arts | Film-Video |
| Kathryn Ramey | Creative Arts | Film-Video |
| Gregory Ruzzin | Creative Arts | Film-Video |
| Courtney Stephens | Creative Arts | Film-Video |
| Ioana Maria Uricaru | Creative Arts | Film-Video |
| Giorgio Bertellini | Creative Arts | Film, Video, and New Media Studies |
| Fred Turner | Creative Arts | Film, Video, and New Media Studies |
| Tyrone Ta-coumba Aiken | Creative Arts | Fine Arts |
| Linda Besemer | Creative Arts | Fine Arts |
| Colin Brant | Creative Arts | Fine Arts |
| Christy Chan | Creative Arts | Fine Arts |
| Anna Craycroft | Creative Arts | Fine Arts |
| Aaron S. Davidson | Creative Arts | Fine Arts |
| Lisa Corinne Davis | Creative Arts | Fine Arts |
| Nathaniel Donnett | Creative Arts | Fine Arts |
| Melissa Dubbin | Creative Arts | Fine Arts |
| June Edmonds | Creative Arts | Fine Arts |
| Joey Fauerso | Creative Arts | Fine Arts |
| Chie Fueki | Creative Arts | Fine Arts |
| Maria Gaspar | Creative Arts | Fine Arts |
| Mark Thomas Gibson | Creative Arts | Fine Arts |
| Lisa E. Harris | Creative Arts | Fine Arts |
| Margaret Honda | Creative Arts | Fine Arts |
| Jessica J. Hutchins | Creative Arts | Fine Arts |
| Patrick Jackson | Creative Arts | Fine Arts |
| Cannupa Hanska Luger | Creative Arts | Fine Arts |
| Josephine Meckseper | Creative Arts | Fine Arts |
| Yunhee Min | Creative Arts | Fine Arts |
| Janice Nowinski | Creative Arts | Fine Arts |
| Anna Sew Hoy | Creative Arts | Fine Arts |
| Lynne Woods Turner | Creative Arts | Fine Arts |
| Alisha Wormsley | Creative Arts | Fine Arts |
| Bruce Yonemoto | Creative Arts | Fine Arts |
| Jennifer DeVere Brody | Humanities | Fine Arts Research |
| Sylvester Okwunodu Ogbechie | Humanities | Fine Arts Research |
| Shawn Michelle Smith | Humanities | Fine Arts Research |
| Rebecca Donner | Creative Arts | General Nonfiction |
| Melissa Febos | Creative Arts | General Nonfiction |
| Michael Pollan | Creative Arts | General Nonfiction |
| Christopher Sorrentino | Creative Arts | General Nonfiction |
| Jerald Walker | Creative Arts | General Nonfiction |
| Edward L. Widmer | Creative Arts | General Nonfiction |
| Thomas Chatterton Williams | Creative Arts | General Nonfiction |
| Edward Wilson-Lee | Creative Arts | General Nonfiction |
| Karen Bakker | Natural Sciences | Geography and Environmental Studies |
| Elena Bennett | Natural Sciences | Geography and Environmental Studies |
| Geoff Mann | Natural Sciences | Geography and Environmental Studies |
| Katja Guenther | Humanities | History of Science, Technology, and Economics |
| Rebecca L. Spang | Humanities | History of Science, Technology, and Economics |
| Suzanne Lynn Marchand | Humanities | Intellectual and Cultural History |
| Esther Schor | Humanities | Intellectual and Cultural History |
| Robert F. Barsky | Social Sciences | Law |
| Osagie K. Obasogie | Social Sciences | Law |
| Vera Gribanova | Humanities | Linguistics |
| Bénédicte Boisseron | Humanities | Literary Criticism |
| Stathis Gourgouris | Humanities | Literary Criticism |
| Daniel Hack | Humanities | Literary Criticism |
| Paul Saint-Amour | Humanities | Literary Criticism |
| John Zilcosky | Humanities | Literary Criticism |
| Manjul Bhargava | Natural Sciences | Mathematics |
| Lauren K. Williams | Natural Sciences | Mathematics |
| Jodi Halpern | Natural Sciences | Medicine and Health |
| Charlene M. Eska | Humanities | Medieval and Renaissance History |
| Katherine L. French | Humanities | Medieval and Renaissance History |
| Patricia Alessandrini | Creative Arts | Music Composition |
| Phyllis Chen | Creative Arts | Music Composition |
| David Dominique | Creative Arts | Music Composition |
| Peter Evans | Creative Arts | Music Composition |
| Jonathan Bailey Holland | Creative Arts | Music Composition |
| Sungji Hong | Creative Arts | Music Composition |
| Panayiotis Kokoras | Creative Arts | Music Composition |
| Charles Peck | Creative Arts | Music Composition |
| Leah Reid | Creative Arts | Music Composition |
| Rafael Rosa | Creative Arts | Music Composition |
| Örjan Sandred | Creative Arts | Music Composition |
| Nathan Shields | Creative Arts | Music Composition |
| Marlon Simon | Creative Arts | Music Composition |
| Alejandro L. Madrid | Humanities | Music Research |
| Guthrie P. Ramsey, Jr. | Humanities | Music Research |
| Yoav Di-Capua | Humanities | Near Eastern Studies |
| Juliette Kennedy | Humanities | Philosophy |
| Christopher Peacocke | Humanities | Philosophy |
| Amie Thomasson | Humanities | Philosophy |
| Keliy Anderson-Staley | Creative Arts | Photography |
| Gary Burnley | Creative Arts | Photography |
| Kelli Connell | Creative Arts | Photography |
| Sam Contis | Creative Arts | Photography |
| Kristen Joy Emack | Creative Arts | Photography |
| Odette England | Creative Arts | Photography |
| Nancy Elizabeth Floyd | Creative Arts | Photography |
| Philip David Heying | Creative Arts | Photography |
| Robert Bruce Langham III | Creative Arts | Photography |
| Lorie Novak | Creative Arts | Photography |
| Ed Panar | Creative Arts | Photography |
| Mimi Plumb | Creative Arts | Photography |
| Rebecca Soderholm | Creative Arts | Photography |
| Yong Baek Kim | Natural Sciences | Physics |
| Eduardo C. Corral | Creative Arts | Poetry |
| Allison Funk | Creative Arts | Poetry |
| Yona Harvey | Creative Arts | Poetry |
| Jay Hopler | Creative Arts | Poetry |
| Joyelle McSweeney | Creative Arts | Poetry |
| Tomás Q. Morín | Creative Arts | Poetry |
| Valzhyna Mort | Creative Arts | Poetry |
| Brendan Nyhan | Social Sciences | Political Science |
| Milan Svolik | Social Sciences | Political Science |
| Suparna Rajaram | Social Sciences | Psychology |
| David Brakke | Humanities | Religion |
| Judith Weisenfeld | Humanities | Religion |
| Jyoti Puri | Social Sciences | Sociology |
| Daphne A. Brooks | Humanities | Theatre Arts and Performance Studies |
| Matt Reeck | Humanities | Translation |
| Keisha N. Blain | Humanities | United States History |
| Brenda J. Child | Humanities | United States History |
| Jennifer Mittelstadt | Humanities | United States History |
| Claudio Saunt | Humanities | United States History |
| Manisha Sinha | Humanities | United States History |
