= Olufemi Vaughan =

Nigerian academic

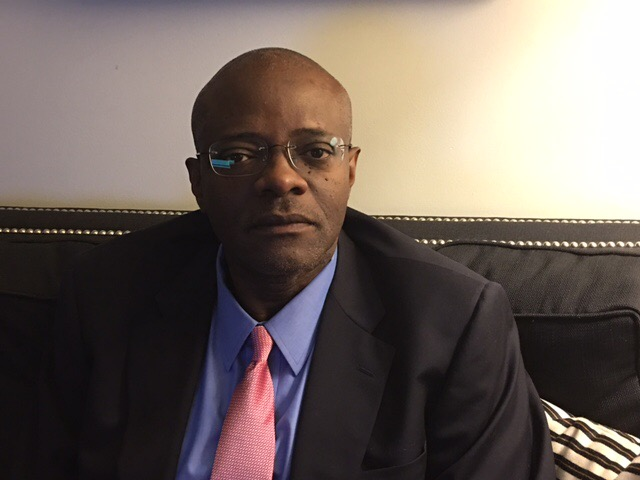
Olufemi O. Vaughan

Olufemi O. Vaughan is a Nigerian academic whose research and teaching focuses on African Political and Social History, African Politics, Diaspora Studies, African Migrations and Globalization, Religion and African States. He is currently the Alfred Sargent Lee '41 and Mary Ames Lee Professor of African Studies at Amherst College, Amherst, Massachusetts.

== Early life and career ==
Olufemi O. Vaughan was born and raised in Ibadan, Nigeria, before moving to the United States. He obtained his B.A. in 1980 and M.A. in 1983 in Government from St. John's University. Vaughan received his PhD in Politics from Oxford University in 1989, where his research was influenced by three distinguished Africanists: Anthony Kirk-Greene, Terence Ranger, and Gavin Williams. He was Professor of Africana Studies and History at the State University of New York, Stony Brook, where he also directed the International Studies Program, the College for Global Studies, and was associate dean and associate provost from 1990 to 2008. Vaughan was Geoffrey Canada Professor of Africana Studies and History at Bowdoin College, Maine, from 2008 to 2017. At Bowdoin, he also directed the establishment of an Africana Studies Program.

Olufemi Vaughan was appointed Alfred Sargent Lee '41 and Mary Ames Lee Professor of African Studies at Amherst College in 2017.

== Scholarship and research ==
Olufemi Vaughan's scholarship and research revolves around five interrelated themes in African political and historical studies: Traditional socio-political structures in modern African states; Governance and development in African states; African migrations and globalization; State-society relations and political legitimacy in Nigeria; and Religion and State Formation in Nigeria. He is the author and editor of ten books and over eighty scholarly articles and reviews, including Nigerian Chiefs: Traditional Power in Modern Politics, 1890s–1990s, considered a seminal work on the study of traditional authorities in contemporary African states, Religion and the Making of Nigeria, an acclaimed work on the foundational role of Christianity and Islam in the formation of the Nigerian state and society, and Chiefs, Power, and Social Change: Chiefship and Modern Politics in Botswana, 1880s–1990s. His articles and reviews have appeared in scholarly journals such as the Journal of African History, African Affairs: Journal of the Royal African Society, Journal of Asian & African Studies, Politique Africaine, Journal of Commonwealth & Comparative Politics, American Historical Review, Journal of Modern African Studies, Canadian Journal of History, Canadian Journal of African Studies, African Studies Review, and The International Journal of Politics, Culture, and Society.

== Awards and honors ==
Vaughan is the recipient of major research and teaching awards including a Woodrow Wilson National Fellowship, a Woodrow Wilson Public Policy Fellowship, two Ford Foundation Research fellowships, Distinguished Scholar's Award, Association of Global South Studies, Cecil B. Currey Book Prize, Association of Global South Studies, for his book, Nigerian Chiefs, Nigerian Studies Association Book Prize for his book Religion and the Making of Nigeria, and a State University of New York Chancellor's Award for Excellence in Teaching. He also serves as co-trustee of Omolewa Nursery & Primary School, a leading private elementary school in Ibadan, Nigeria, his late mother, Gladys Aduke Vaughan (Otun-Iyalode of Ibadan) founded in 1962.

The Olubadan of Ibadan Land (the oba --- traditional ruler --- of his hometown, Ibadan in Nigeria) awarded him the honorary title of Aare Onigege Ara of Ibadan in March 2017.

Vaughan was awarded a Guggenheim Fellowship in April 2022.

== Major works ==
- Olufemi Vaughan, Mannish Water: Social, Political and Cultural Essays by Black Scholarly Men in 21st Century America, Trenton, NJ: Africa World Press, 2024, pp. v - 352.
- Olufemi Vaughan, Letters, Kingship and Social Mobility in Nigeria, Madison, WI: University of Wisconsin Press, 2023, pp. v-252.
- Olufemi Vaughan, Religion and the Making of Nigeria, Durham, NC: Duke University Press, 2016, pp. X-311. Nigerian Studies Association Book Prize.
- Olufemi Vaughan, Nigerian Chiefs: Traditional Power in Modern Politics, 1890s–1990s, Rochester, NY: University of Rochester Press, 2000, pp. v-293 (Cecil B. Currey Book Prize, Association of Global South Studies, 2001). Paperback edition, 2006.
- Olufemi Vaughan, Chiefs, Power, and Social Change: Chiefship and Modern Politics in Botswana, 1890s – 1990s, Trenton, N.J: Africa World Press, 2003, pp. v-218.
- Olufemi Vaughan (co-editor) Legitimacy and the State in Twentieth Century Africa, London: Macmillan Press, 1993, pp. vi-284.
- Olufemi Vaughan (editor) Tradition and Politics: Indigenous Political Structures in Africa, Trenton, N.J: Africa World Press, 2005, v-406.
- Olufemi Vaughan (co-editor) West African Migrations: Transnational and Global Pathways in a New Century, New York: Palgrave Macmillan, 2012, pp. 1–280.
- Olufemi Vaughan (co-editor) Transnational Africa & Globalization, New York: Palgrave Macmillan, 2012, pp. 1–266.
- Olufemi Vaughan (editor) Indigenous Political Structures and Governance in Africa, Ibadan, Nigeria: Sefer Academic Press, 2003, pp. xiii-442.
- Olufemi Vaughan (editor) Indigenous Political Structures and Governance in Nigeria, Ibadan, Nigeria: Bookcraft Press; Oxford: Oxford Book Collective, 2004, pp. iv-358.
- Olufemi Vaughan (co-editor) Globalization and Marginalization: Essays on the Paradoxes of Global and Local Forces, Ibadan, Nigeria: Sefer Academic Press, 2005, pp. v-346.
- Olufemi Vaughan, 'Chieftaincy Politics and Communal Identity in Colonial Western Nigeria, 1893–1951', Journal of African History, 44, 2003, pp. 283–302.
- Olufemi Vaughan, 'Assessing Grassroots Politics and Community Development in Nigeria’, African Affairs: The Journal of the Royal African Society, 94, 1995, pp. 501–518.
- Olufemi Vaughan, 'Chieftaincy Politics and Social Relations in Nigeria’, Journal of Commonwealth and Comparative Politics, 29, 3, 1991, pp. 308–327.
- Olufemi Vaughan, 'Communalism, Legitimation, and Party Politics at the Grassroots: The case of the Yoruba’ International Journal of Politics, Culture and Society, 7, 3, 1994, pp. 419–440.
- Olufemi Vaughan, 'The Politics of Global Marginalization’, Journal of Asian and African Studies, 29, 3–4,1994, pp. 186–204.
- Olufemi Vaughan, ’Les Chefs Traditionnels Face au Pouvoir Politique’, Politique Africaine, 32, 1988, pp. 44–56.
- Olufemi Vaughan, ‘Muslim Women Rights in Northern Nigeria’ (with Suraiya Bamu) Woodrow Wilson International Center for Scholars (Africa Program Occasional Papers) 2015, pp. 1–7.
- Olufemi Vaughan, 'Traditional Chiefs and Rulers in Nigeria’, West Africa, March 1989.
- Olufemi Vaughan, 'Decolonization and Legitimation in Nigeria’ in Legitimacy and the State in Twentieth Century Africa, Macmillan, edited by Terence Ranger and Olufemi Vaughan, 1993, pp. 135–161.
- Olufemi Vaughan, 'Introduction’ (with Terence Ranger) in Legitimacy and the State in Twentieth Century Africa, 1993, pp. 1–28.
- Olufemi Vaughan, 'Legitimacy, Civil Society and the Return of Europe’ (with T. Ranger) in Legitimacy and the State in Twentieth Century Africa, 1993, pp. 258–264.
- Olufemi Vaughan, 'Democracy and Civil Society: The Nigerian Transition Programme, 1985–1993' (with J. Ihonvbere) in Democracy and Political Change in sub-Saharan Africa, edited by John Wiseman, London: Routledge, 1995, pp. 71–91.
- Olufemi Vaughan, 'Traditional Rulers and the Crisis of Democratic Transitions in Nigeria’ in Dilemmas of Democracy in Nigeria, edited by Paul A. Beckett and M. Crawford Young, Rochester, NY: University of Rochester Press, 1997, pp. 413–435.
- Olufemi Vaughan, ‘Ife and Oyo Crowns in Colonial and Post-Colonial Nigerian Politics’ in Rethinking African History, edited by Simon McGrath, Charles Jedrej, Kenneth King and Jack Thompson, Edinburgh: University of Edinburgh (African Studies Series), 1997, pp. 227–248.
- Olufemi Vaughan, ‘Africa, Transnationalism, & Globalization: An Overview,’ in Transnational Africa & Globalization, New York: Palgrave Macmillan, 2012, pp. 17–38.
- Olufemi Vaughan, ‘Introduction’ (with Mojubaolu Okome) in Transnational Africa & Globalization, 2012, pp. 1–15.
- Olufemi Vaughan, ‘Introduction’ (with Mojubaolu Okome) in West African Migration: Transnational and Global Pathways in a New Century, New York: Palgrave Macmillan, 2012, pp. 1–14.
- Olufemi Vaughan, ‘Ethno-Regionalism and the Origins of Federalism in Nigeria, in Democracy and Prebendal Politics In Nigeria: Critical interpretations, edited by Wale Adebanwi and Ebenezer Obadare, New York, Palgrave Macmillan, 2013, pp227-242.
- Olufemi Vaughan, ‘Religion and Social Relations in Nigeria’, Journal of Nigerian Studies, 6, 1995, pp1–9
- Olufemi Vaughan, 'Africa's Second Democratic Transition’ (review article), Journal of Third World Studies, 16, 1999, pp. 250–257.
- Olufemi Vaughan, 'Analyzing a Culturally Diverse Experience for Undergraduate Education in International Studies’ Magnificent Press for Ford Foundation, 1999. pp. 1–8.
- Olufemi Vaughan, 'The Ethnic Dimensions of Nigeria's Post-Annulment Crisis: Case Studies from the South’ in The Issue of Political Ethnicity in Africa, edited by Emmanuel Udogu, Aldershot, UK: Ashgate Press, 2000, pp. 79 – 98.
- Olufemi Vaughan, 'Political Ethnicity in Western Nigeria: Chieftaincy, Communal Identities, and Party Politics’ in The Transformation of Nigeria, edited by Bayo Oyebade, Trenton: Africa World Press, 2002, pp. 435 – 462
- Olufemi Vaughan, 'Chieftaincy Structures and State Formation in Africa’ in Africa Since 1939: Colonialism, Nationalism and Decolonization, Volume IV, edited by Toyin Falola, Durham, NC: Carolina Academic Press, 2002, pp. 209–222.
- Olufemi Vaughan, 'Political Science and the Study of African Politics: A view from the Grassroots’ in African Studies and Research Methodology, edited by Abdul Karim Bangura, Lanham, MD: University Press of America, 1994, pp. 147–165
- Olufemi Vaughan, 'Political Restructuring, Civil Society, and Governance in Africa: The Politics of Integrated Rural Development in Nigeria’ in The Transition to Democratic Governance in Africa: The Continuing Struggle, edited by John Mbaku and Julius Ihonvbere, Westport, CT: Praeger Press, 2003, pp. 249–262.
- Olufemi Vaughan, 'Governance and Community Development in Africa’ in Postcolonial Africa, Volume V, edited by Toyin Falola, Durham, NC: Carolina Academic Press, 2003, pp. 257–274.
- Olufemi Vaughan, 'Exigencies of Modernity and Shifting Global African Identities’ (with N. Afolabi), in Marvels of the African World: Africa, New World Connections, and Identities, edited by Niyi Afolabi, Trenton, NJ: Africa World Press, 2003, pp. 83–98.
- Olufemi Vaughan, 'The Crisis of the Nigerian State: Paradoxes of the Local and the Global’ in Globalizing Africa: Politics, Economy and Culture, edited by Malinda Smith, Trenton, NJ: Africa World Press, 2003, pp. 111–126.
- Olufemi Vaughan, 'Introduction’ in Indigenous Political Structures and Governance in Africa, edited by Olufemi Vaughan, Ibadan, Nigeria: Sefer Press, 2003, pp. 1–9.
- Olufemi Vaughan, 'Chiefship and Democracy in Botswana’ in Indigenous Political Structures and Governance in Africa, edited by Olufemi Vaughan, pp. 132–159.
- Olufemi Vaughan, 'Introduction’, in Indigenous Political Structures and Governance in Nigeria, edited by Olufemi Vaughan, Ibadan, Nigeria: Bookcraft Press; Oxford: Oxford Book Collective, 2004, pp. 1–10.
- Olufemi Vaughan, 'Traditional Rulers and the Formation of the Postcolonial Nigerian State’ in Indigenous Political Structures and Governance in Nigeria, edited by Olufemi Vaughan, pp. 47–76.
- Olufemi Vaughan, 'Introduction’ (with Macheta Wright and Charles Small), in Globalization and Marginalization: Essays on the Paradoxes of Global and Local Forces, edited by Olufemi Vaughan, Marcheta Wright, and Charles Small, Sefer Press, Ibadan, Nigeria, 2005, pp. 1–10.
- Olufemi Vaughan, 'The Crisis of the Nigerian State in the Global Era’ in Globalization and Marginalization: Essays on the Paradoxes of Global and Local Forces, edited by Olufemi Vaughan, Marcheta Wright, and Charles Small, pp. 112–135.
- Olufemi Vaughan, 'Religion and State Formation in Nigeria,’ in Nigeria in the Twenty-First Century: Strategies for Political Stability and Peaceful Coexistence, edited by Emmanuel Ike Udogu, Africa World Press, 2005, pp. 113–132.
- Olufemi Vaughan, 'Foreword’ Foundations of American Political Thought, Constance Polin and Raymond Polin (eds.) Peter Lang, 2006.
- Olufemi Vaughan, 'African Social Formations in Historical Perspective’ (review article), Journal of Asian and African Studies, 41, 2006, pp. 278–284.
- Olufemi Vaughan, 'Chieftaincy Structures, Communal Identity, and Decolonization in Yorubaland,’ in Yoruba Identity and Power Politics, edited by Ann Genova and Toyin Falola, Rochester, NY: University of Rochester Press, 2006, pp. 177–191.
- Olufemi Vaughan, ‘Toyin Falola: The Scholar-Teacher in the Global Era,’ in Toyin Falola: The Man, the Mask, the Muse, edited by Niyi Afolabi, Durham, NC: Carolina Press, 2010, pp. 127–134.
- Olufemi Vaughan, ‘Ethnicity and State Crisis in Southern Nigeria,’ Intellectual Agent, Mediator, and Interlocutor: A. B. Assensho and African Politics in Transition, Newcastle upon Tyne, UK: Cambridge Scholars Publishing, 2014, pp. 51–66.
- Olufemi Vaughan, ‘Agbekoya: Peasant Rebellion in Western Nigeria, 1967–1969’ in Encyclopedia of the Yoruba, edited by Toyin Falola, Indiana University Press, 2016.
- Olufemi Vaughan, ‘Sharia Politics, the 1999 Constitution, and the Rise of the Fourth Republic,’ Oxford Handbook of Nigerian Politics, edited by Carl Levan & Patrick Ukata, Oxford University Press.
