= Paget Henry =

American Africana philosopher (born 1946)

- Born: Paget Elseworth Henry; 1946 (age 79–80)
- Occupation: Philosopher

Academic background
- Education: PhD in sociology at Cornell University (1976)
- Alma mater: Cornell University

Academic work
- Discipline: Sociologist, Africana Studies scholar
- Institutions: Brown University

Paget Henry (born 1946) is a Antiguan-born American Africana philosopher, professor emeritus at Brown University, and an editor in chief of The CLR James Journal, an official publication of Caribbean Philosophical Association. Henry's areas of research include economic and political challenges in the Caribbean, Caribbean thinkers and theorists, as well as culture and development in the Caribbean and Africa.

== Awards and fellowships ==
- His awards and fellowships include Research Fellow at the Bildner Center for Western Hemispheric Studies
- Research Fellow at the Center for Inter-American Relations
- Ford Foundation Grant.
- University of Virginia Annual Award for Excellence in Teaching, in four consecutive years (1976 to 1980)
- Frederick Sperling Award in Philosophy (1970).

== Selected works ==
- Henry, Paget (1985). Peripheral Capitalism and Underdevelopment in Antigua. Transaction Books. ISBN 9780878554904.
- Henry, Paget (2000). Caliban's Reason: Introducing Afro-Caribbean Philosophy. Routledge. ISBN 9780415926461.
