= L'aspirateur (1908 film) =

1906 French silent short film

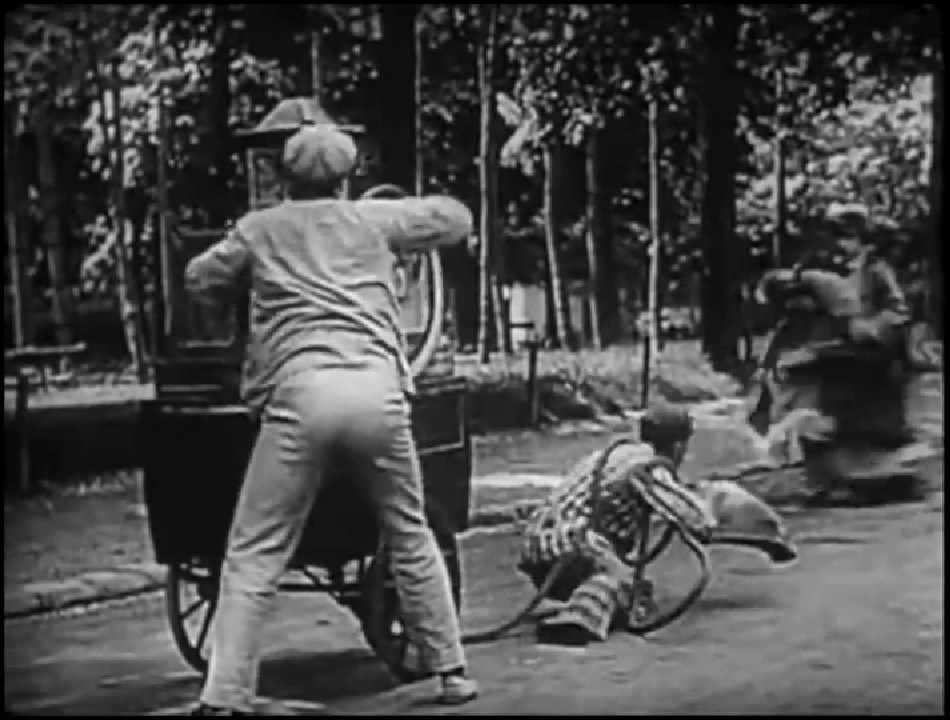
- Directed by: Segundo de Chomón
- Cinematography: Segundo de Chomón
- Production company: Pathé Frères
- Distributed by: Pathé Company
- Release date: 1908
- Running time: 4 minutes
- Country: France

L'aspirateur (1908)

L'aspirateur is a French silent short film directed by Segundo de Chomón and distributed in English-speaking countries under the titles The Aspirator and The Vacuum Cleaner. According to different sources, the film was released in 1908. The film combines stop-motion tricks with continuity editing and cross-cutting.

== Plot ==
Two men give the street vacuum cleaner they have just stolen an original purpose. Not content with collecting the various utensils they find on their way, they take turns sucking up the peaceful passers-by who have the misfortune to pass within their reach: nannies, lovers, town sergeants, are irresistibly attracted and snatched up one after the other, despite their desperate efforts, by this voracious hoover. Fortunately, the mischievous criminals are finally "sucked up" in their turn while they are resting from their "work" on the terrace of a wine merchant, by the policemen launched in pursuit. Then the device, delicately turned in the opposite direction, gives back to freedom the unfortunate victims that it had sucked up.

== Analysis ==
The mention of a 1906 release date in IMDb may have resulted from a confusion with the 1906 film directed by Walter R. Booth, The Vacuum Cleaner Nightmare, which is based on a similar idea, albeit happening in a nightmare only.

Richard Abel mentions this film as an example of "Pre-Feature, Single-Reel Story Film", noting that it "comes to a kind of climax in a sequence of alternating exterior and interior (shots), when they empty an apartment of its furniture and even pull in a maid from the next room."

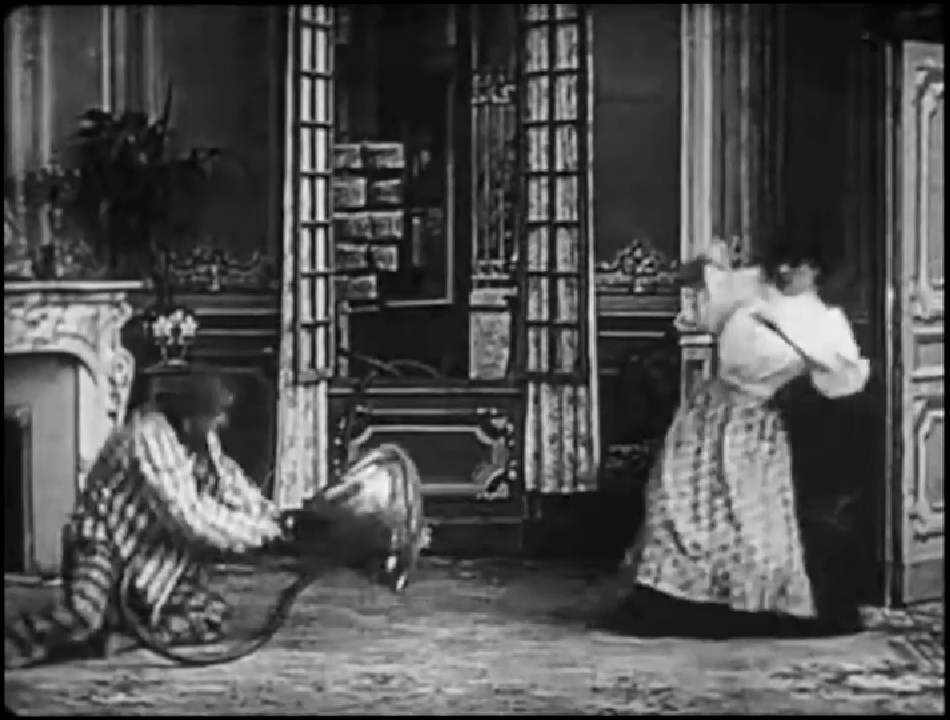
Shot 8
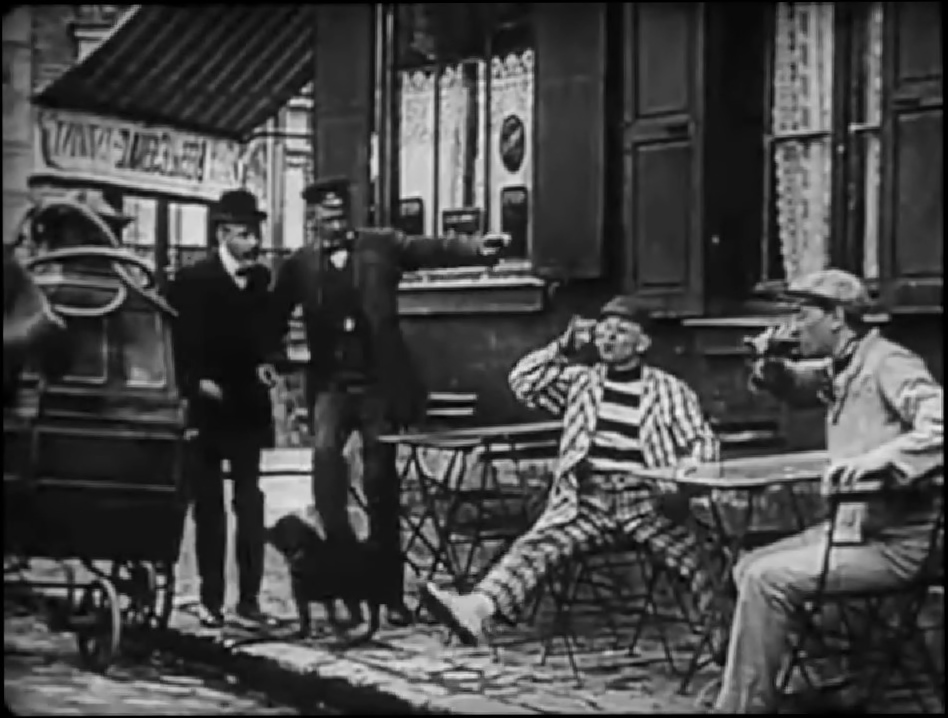
Shot 12

The film is composed of 15 full shots:

1. A street. Two street cleaners with a hand-cranked vacuum cleaner suck up various objects. They exit, leaving the machine unattended. Two men enter and take away the vacuum cleaner, exiting right.
2. The corner of two streets. The two men enter left. They suck up a lady and her dog. They exit right.
3. A lane in a park. The two men enter left. They suck up a woman who swirls around before disappearing in the machine. They exit left.
4. Another lane in a park. The two men enter left a suck up a couple.They exit right.
5. A street in front of a building. The two men enter left. One of them opens a window and climbs inside.
6. A parlour with the window open. One of the men climbs inside and the other gives him the pipe of the vacuum cleaner. He sucks up a table, a guéridon, a chair.
7. Same view as 5. The other man is cranking the machine.
8. Same view as 6. The man sucks a maid who has entered right. He gives back the pipe to the man outside and climbs down the window.
9. Same view as 5. The man comes out of the window and the two men exit left.
10. The facade of a barn with des bundles of wood. The men enter left, suck two bundles of wood and exit right.
11. The facade of a police station with an officer standing in front of the door. The two men enter left and suck up various policemen before exiting right.
12. The terrasse of a café with a waiter standing up. The two men enter left, sit down and order a drink. A man with a bowler hat accompanied by one wearing a uniform enter left. They unfold the pipe of the machine and suck up the two sitting men before exiting right.
13. A clearing surrounded by trees. The two men enter left and the uniformed man unfolds the pipe.
14. Same view as 1. The two street cleaners enter left and look for their machine.
15. Same view as 13. The man with the bowler hat cranks the machine counterclockwise and all the contents which had been sucked in reappear.
