= Caribbean Philosophical Association =

Philosophical organization

The Caribbean Philosophical Association (CPA) is a philosophical organization founded in 2002 at the Center for Caribbean Thought at the University of the West Indies, in Mona, Jamaica. The founding members were George Belle, B. Anthony Bogues, Patrick Goodin, Lewis Gordon, Clevis Headley, Paget Henry, Nelson Maldonado-Torres, Charles Mills, and Supriya Nair. The association promotes the view that philosophy is the "rigorous theoretical reflection about fundamental problems faced by humanity", and that Caribbean philosophy in particular should be seen as "a transdisciplinary form of interrogation informed by scholarly knowledges as well as by practices and artistic expressions that elucidate fundamental questions that emerge in contexts of 'discovery,' conquest, racial, gender, and sexual domination, genocide, dependency, and exploitation as well as freedom, emancipation, and decolonization."

The organization sponsors an annual meeting and offers prizes for work that furthers the decolonization and liberation of mankind. The CPA has awarded the Frantz Fanon Prize to Enrique Dussel, Walter Mignolo, Nigel Gibson and Berghahn Books. The Nicolás Guillén Lifetime Achievement Award has been given to Ngugi wa Thiong’o, Samuel R. Delany, George Lamming, Jamaica Kincaid, Hortense Spillers, and Conceição Evaristo. The Nicolás Guillén Book Awards for philosophical literature have been awarded to Gabriel García Márquez, Gordon Rohlehr, Jose F. Buscaglia-Salgado, Supriya Nair, Frieda Ekotto, Bénédicte Boisseron, Víctor Fowler Calzada, LaRose Parris, Arturo Dávila-Sánchez, Jeremy Matthew Glick, Nadia V. Celis-Salgado, Lisa Lowe, Felwine Sarr, Rowan Ricardo Phillips, and Phillip Barron.

The CLR James Journal, established in 1990, is the official publication of the Caribbean Philosophical Association, and is "a peer-reviewed forum for the discussion of the work and legacy of Cyril Lionel Robert James, and the wider field of Caribbean ideas to which James was a major contributor."

== See also ==
- Contemporary philosophy
