= Helen Kimble =

Africanist and campaigner (1925–2019)

Helen Kimble, née Rankin (1925 – 4 December 2019) was an Africanist and campaigner.

== Life ==
Helen Rankin was born in Boxmoor, Hertfordshire, the daughter of Thomas Rankin, a Scottish doctor, and Kathleen McClelland. She was educated at Queenswood School. After Girton College, Cambridge, where she graduated in 1945 in economics and literature, she did postgraduate training in adult education at Oxford University, where she was supervised by Thomas Lionel Hodgkin. After a job as an editor at the Bureau of Current Affairs in London, she married the academic David Kimble. He was appointed director of extramural studies at the University College of the Gold Coast, and the couple left for Ghana in 1949.

The Kimbles worked together on several projects, particularly publications for African audiences. Helen edited a series of pamphlets on African current affairs, and co-edited the African series for Penguin Group. In 1963 she and David co-founded the Journal of Modern African Studies, co-editing it until 1972. She also taught economics at the University of Dar es Salaam.

Divorcing David in 1977, Helen moved to live in Oxford. She worked with the anti-apartheid movement, monitoring the 1994 South African general election, which brought Nelson Mandela to power. She also campaigned in support of the refugees imprisoned at Campsfield House.

She died aged 94 on 4 December 2019.

== Works ==
- (with David Kimble) Adult education in a changing Africa : a report on the Inter-African Seminar held in the Gold Coast from December 10 to 23, 1954. 1955.
- Price control in Tanzania. 1968.
- Effective membership of agricultural co-operatives : report on pilot study in Oxfordshire. 1977.
- Desperately seeking asylum: the view from Oxford. 1998.
- (ed.) Migrant labour and colonial rule in Basutoland, 1890-1930 by Judith M. Kimble. 1999.
