= Leah Reid =

American composer (born 1985)

- Born: 1985 (age 40–41); New Hampshire, U.S.
- Education: McGill University; Stanford University
- Occupation: Composer
- Employer: University of Virginia
- Spouse: James DeMuth
- Awards: Guggenheim Fellowship (2022)

Academic background
- Thesis: Composing timbre spaces, composing timbre in space (2013)
- Doctoral advisor: Mark Applebaum
- Musical career
- Genres: Electroacoustic

Leah Christinne Reid (born 1985) is an American composer. A 2022 Guggenheim Fellow, she does work in electroacoustic music and is a professor at the University of Virginia.

== Biography ==
Reid was born in 1985 in New Hampshire; her mother Chris Reid is a painter, with whom she once collaborated. After attending Walnut Hill School as a composition and vocal performance major, she studied at McGill University (where she obtained her bachelor of music degree) and Stanford University (where she obtained her master of arts and doctor of musical arts degrees); her doctoral dissertation Composing timbre spaces, composing timbre in space was supervised by Mark Applebaum.

In 2016, her piece Single Fish was performed at MicroFest by Accordant Commons in Los Angeles; Elizabeth Hambleton of New Classic LA called it "a great celebration of the sounds three humans can make together". In 2017, she was appointed a MacDowell Fellow. Her experimental piece "Sk(etch)", where she would record herself writing words, was featured on NPR Morning Edition in January 2022, and it won the Tesselat Electronic Music Competition. That same year, she was awarded a Guggenheim Fellowship in Music Composition, and she was the first-place winner of the 2022 Musicworks Electronic Music Composition Contest with her acousmatic piece Reverie.

In 2023, she was awarded a second MacDowell fellowship. She was the composer-in-residence of the 2025 Women Composers Festival of Hartford.

She works at the University of Virginia as an assistant professor of composition. She has also served in Society for Electro-Acoustic Music in the United States as vice-president for programs and projects, as well as vice-president of the International Alliance for Women in Music.

Her main research interests include the perception, modeling, and compositional applications of timbre; using timbre as a way to explore time, space, perception, and color in her compositions.

As of 2022, she lived in Woburn, Massachusetts. She is married to James DeMuth.
