= Bénédicte Boisseron =

French academic

- Born: Paris, France
- Awards: Guggenheim Fellow (2022)

Academic background
- Education: Paris Diderot University; University of Michigan
- Thesis: Taking the Postcolonial Lead: Decentering the Metropole through Martinican Literature (2006)
- Doctoral advisor: Frieda Ekotto; Jarrod Hayes

Academic work
- Discipline: Black studies
- Institutions: University of Montana; University of Michigan

Bénédicte Boisseron is a French academic. She has worked as a professor at the University of Montana and University of Michigan. A 2022 Guggenheim Fellow, she is author of Creole Renegades (2014) and Afro-Dog (2018).

== Biography ==
Bénédicte Boisseron was born in Paris. Her father is a Black French native of Guadeloupe and her mother from Metropolitan France. After obtaining her MA in English at Paris Diderot University, she moved to the United States to obtain her PhD in French and Francophone studies at the University of Michigan; her doctoral dissertation Taking the Postcolonial Lead: Decentering the Metropole through Martinican Literature (2006) was supervised by Frieda Ekotto and Jarrod Hayes.

After she spent some time as an associate professor of French and Francophone studies at the University of Montana. she returned to UMich and became professor there, as well as chair of the Department of Afroamerican and African Studies.

Boisseron specialises in Black studies. She won the 2015 Caribbean Philosophical Association Award for Outstanding Book in Philosophical Literature for her book Creole Renegades. In 2018, she released another book, Afro-Dog; she had been inspired to write the book by local suspicions towards a dog her parents brought with them during their move into the Caribbean. In 2022, she was awarded a Guggenheim Fellow in Literary Criticism.

In 2011, she and Frieda Ekotto were co-editors of a short story anthology named Voix du monde: Nouvelles francophones. She and Astrid Billat co-authored La culture francophone, a French language education textbook published in 2016 by Hackett Publishing Company.

== Bibliopgrahy ==
- (with Frieda Ekotto) Voix du monde: Nouvelles francophones (2011)
- Creole Renegades (2014)
- (with Astrid Billat) La culture francophone: le monde à l'écoute (2016)
- Afro-Dog (2018)
