= Daniel A. Barber =

American architect

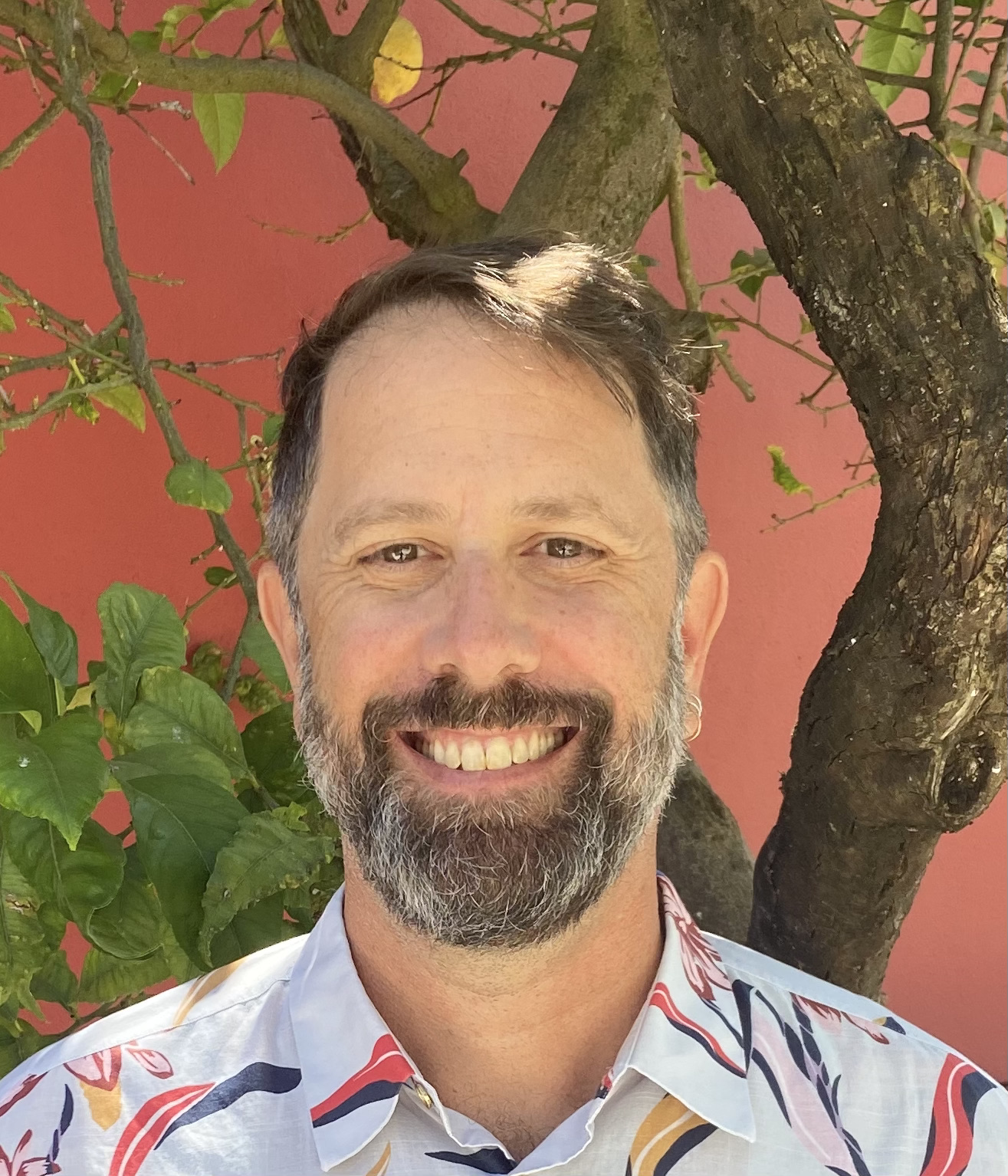
- Daniel A. Barber (2021)
- Education: Columbia University; Yale University
- Writing career
- Notable works: A House in the Sun (2016); Modern Architecture and Climate (2020)

Daniel A. Barber is Professor of Architecture at the Technical University of Eindhoven (TU/e). Daniel has held academic positions and fellowships at Harvard University, the University of Pennsylvania, Princeton University, and Yale University, and at the Instituto Universitário de Lisboa, the Rachel Carson Center for Environment and Society, the Max Planck Institute for the History of Science in Berlin, and, most recently as Head of School at the University of Technology Sydney, and as a Senior Research Fellow at the Centre for Apocalyptic and Post-Apocalyptic Studies (CAPAS) at the Universität Heidelberg. He was awarded the Guggenheim Fellowship in 2022-3.

== Education ==
He holds a PhD in Architecture (History and Theory) from Columbia University, granted by the Columbia Graduate School of Architecture, Planning and Preservation (GSAPP) and the Columbia Graduate School of Arts and Sciences (GSAS). He also holds a Master of Environmental Design (MED) from Yale School of Architecture. He received his MFA Studio Arts from Mills College in Oakland, California and his BA in Comparative History of Ideas from the University of Washington, Seattle.

== Scholarship and research ==
Barber's research and teaching focus on how practice and pedagogy are changing to address the climate emergency. As a 2022–2023 Guggenheim Fellow, he is working on the project Thermal Practices.

His most recent book is Modern Architecture and Climate: Design before Air Conditioning (Princeton University Press, 2020), which followed on from A House in the Sun: Modern Architecture and Solar Energy in the Cold War (Oxford University Press, 2016). His essay “After Comfort” (Log 49, 2019) has been translated into five languages; it forms the basis for a series of essays and projects on the e-flux architecture online platform. Barber lectures internationally, including a recent talk at the International Architecture Biennale Rotterdam, and the keynote "Architecture in the Overshoot" to close the exhibition Anthropocene at the Narodowy Instytut Architektury I Urbanistyki, Warsaw, Poland. Barber is increasingly focused on amplifying the climate-relevant work of scholars and practitioners, and on developing concepts and frameworks for architects, policymakers, developers, and others to engage the climate emergency. He is co-founder of the Current: Collective on Environment and Architectural History and co-editor of the annual Accumulation series on e-flux architecture, now also in a print volume. In 2021 he co-edited a special issue of Future Anterior focused on preservation and retrofit, and is part of the Cohabitations editorial collective, supporting interdisciplinary and multi-sited research on climate, displacement, and design. In 2022 Barber was appointed as a member of the editorial Board of Fabrications: Society of Architectural Historians, Australia and New Zealand.

== Awards ==
- Guggenheim Fellow, 2022-3

== Publications ==
- Barber, Daniel A. Modern Architecture and Climate: Design Before Air Conditioning. Princeton: Princeton University Press, 2020. ISBN 978-0691170039
- Barber, Daniel A. A House in the Sun: Modern Architecture and Solar Energy in the Cold War. Oxford: Oxford University Press, 2016. ISBN 978-0199394012
- Willis, Daniel, William W. Braham, Katsuhiko Muramoto, and Daniel A. Barber, eds. Energy Accounts: Architectural Representations of Energy, Climate, and the Future. London ; New York: Routledge, Taylor & Francis Group, 2017. ISBN 978-1138914117
- Barber, Daniel A., Kevin Bone, Steven Hillyer, and Sunnie Joh, eds. Lessons from Modernism: Environmental Design Strategies in Architecture, 1925–1970. New York: The Cooper Union Institute for Sustainable Design, The Irwin S. Chanin School of Architecture of The Cooper Union : The Monacelli Press, 2014. ISBN 978-1580933841
