= Rosalind C. Morris =

Canadian anthropologist and cultural critic

- Awards: Guggenheim Fellowship (2022)

Academic background
- Education: York University (MA); University of Chicago (PhD)

Academic work
- Discipline: Anthropology
- Institutions: Columbia University

Rosalind C. Morris is a Canadian anthropologist and cultural critic. She is Professor of Anthropology at Columbia University. She is the recipient of a Guggenheim Fellowship in 2022.

== Biography ==
Morris grew up in Canada and spent her childhood in Kimberley, British Columbia and Vancouver. She completed her BA at the University of British Columbia and received her MA from York University, and PhD from the University of Chicago. She joined the Columbia faculty in 1994.

Morris' early work was centered on the history of modernity and mass media in Southeast Asia, with a focus on Thailand. For the past twenty years, her work has focused on exploring the lives of mining communities in Southern Africa.

She has served as the director of the Institute for Research on Women and Gender and associate director of the Institute for Comparative Literature and Society at Columbia University.

Morris is also a documentary filmmaker, poet, and librettist. She made the documentary We are Zama Zama that shed light on the lives of South Africa's migrant mining workers excavating in the country's abandoned gold mines. She also made her Royal Opera debut in 2015 as co-librettist with Yvette Christiansë for Syrian-born composer Zaid Jabri’s opera Cities of Salt.

She received a Guggenheim Fellowship in 2022, and her proposed topic is a multi-genre book that will reflect on "the lived experience of natural resource extractionism."
