= Christopher Clapham (Africanist) =

British political scientist

Christopher S. Clapham OBE (born 1941) is a British Africanist and political scientist. He read philosophy, politics and economics at Keble College, Oxford, graduating in 1963. In 1971 he joined Lancaster University and served there as senior lecturer in politics (1974–1989) and then professor of politics and international relations (1989–2002). Since 2002 Clapham is a professor, now emeritus, based at the Centre of African Studies of Cambridge University. He served as the editor of Journal of Modern African Studies from 1997 up to 2012. He was a president to the African Studies Association of the United Kingdom from 1992 to 1994.

== Selected publications ==
Clapham's publications include:

=== Main publications ===
- Haile-Selassie's government, New York: Frederick A. Praeger, 1969
- Liberia and Sierra Leone: an essay in comparative politics, Cambridge, UK: Cambridge University Press, African Studies Series, 20, 1976, 2009
- Foreign policy making in developing states, a comparative approach, Farnborough, England: Saxon House, 1977
- Private patronage and public power, political clientelism in the modern state, New York: St. Martin's Press, 1982
- The political dilemmas of military regimes, Christopher Clapham and George D. E. Philip, Eds., London: Routledge, 1985, 2021
- Third World politics: an introduction, London: Routledge, 1985, 1998
- Transformation and Continuity in Revolutionary Ethiopia, Cambridge, UK: Cambridge University Press, 1988
- Africa and the International System: the Politics of State Survival, Cambridge University Press, 1996
- African Guerrillas, Christopher Clapham, Ed., Oxford: James Currey, 1998
- Liberia and Sierra Leone: an Essay in Comparative Politics, Cambridge, UK: Cambridge University Press. African Studies Series 20, 2009
- Africa and the International System, Christopher Clapham, Thomas Biersteker, Chris Brown, Phil Cerny, Joseph Grieco. Cambridge, UK: Cambridge University Press. Series: Studies in international relations, 2009
- The Horn of Africa: state formation and decay, London: Hurst, 2017

=== Further publications ===
- The caves of Sof Omar, Addis Ababa: Ethiopian Tourist Organization, 1967
- Conflicts in Africa, London, International Institute for Strategic Studies, Series: Adelphi papers, no. 93, [1972]
- Feudalism, modernisation, and the Ethiopian monarchy, Addis Ababa: Addis Ababa University, 1976
- The African state, Royal African Society. Conference on Sub-Saharan Africa, London: Royal African Association, 1991
- The African state in the post-cold war era, Magaliesberg, 1993
- Papers. African Studies Association of the UK: biennial conference, University of Lancaster, 5–7 September 1994. Christopher S. Clapham, Ed., [African Studies Association of the United Kingdom], [1994]
- Ethiopia and Eritrea. The politics of post-insurgency, Chapter 6 in Democracy and Political Change in Sub-Saharan Africa, John A. Wiseman, Ed., London: Routledge, 1995
- Boundary and territory in the Horn of Africa, in African boundaries: Barriers, conduits and opportunities, P. Nugent and A. I. Asiwaju, Eds., London: Pinter, 1996a: 237–250
- Culture of Politics in Modern Kenya. Angelique Haugerud, David Anderson, Carolyn Brown, Christopher S. Clapham, and Michael Gomez. Cambridge, UK: Cambridge University Press, 1997
- Being peacekept, Aldershot: Ashgate, in Peacekeeping in Africa, Oliver Furley and Roy May, Eds., London: Routledge Library Editions: Postcolonial Security Studies, 1998
- The foreign policies of Ethiopia and Eritrea, in African foreign policies. Stephen Wright, Ed., Boulder: Westview Press, 1999
- Regional integration in Southern Africa. Comparative international perspectives, Johannesburg, South Africa: South African Institute of International Affairs (SAIIA), 1999, 2001
- The decay and attempted reconstruction of African territorial statehood, Leipzig: Institut für Afrikanistik, 2004
- Big African States: Angola, DRC, Ethiopia, Nigeria, South Africa, Sudan. Christopher Clapham, Jeffrey Herbst, Greg Mills, Eds., University of the Witwatersrand: Wits University Press, 2006
