= Stathis Gourgouris =

- Στάθης Γουργουρής
- Born: 1958 (age 67–68); Los Angeles, California, U.S.
- Awards: Guggenheim Fellowship (2022)

Academic background
- Education: University of California, Los Angeles (BA, MA, PhD)

Academic work
- Discipline: Comparative Literature
- Institutions: Princeton University; University of California, Los Angeles; Columbia University

Stathis Gourgouris (/ˈstɑːθɪs ɡʊərˈɡʊərɪs/; Greek: Στάθης Γουργουρής; (Note: Greek: [ˈstaθis ɣurɣuˈris]) born 1958) is a Greek scholar, poet, essayist, translator, and sound artist based in New York. He is Professor of Classics, English, Comparative Literature & Society at Columbia University. His intellectual work spans political philosophy, literary and fine arts criticism, ancient Greek thought, postcolonial theory, and poetics. He also writes opinion pieces on contemporary politics and culture in newspapers and internet media in both Greek and English.

He is the recipient of a Guggenheim Fellowship in 2022 and the Lenfest Distinguished Faculty Award (2015), which is Columbia’s highest faculty honor, as well as fellowships from the Templeton Foundation, Mellon Foundation, National Endowment for the Humanities, Wright-Ingraham Institute, and Fulbright. He was also a former president of the Modern Greek Studies Association (2006–2012) and director of the Institute for Comparative Literature and Society at Columbia (2009–2015). He is a founding member of the Sublamental Artists Collective, which releases his music and sound art compositions under the name Count G.

== Biography ==
Gourgouris was born in Los Angeles in 1958 and grew up in Athens, Greece. He earned his B.A., M.A., and Ph.D., all from the University of California, Los Angeles. He taught at Princeton University from 1992 to 2000, Columbia University from 2002 to 2005, University of California, Los Angeles from 2005 to 2008, before rejoining Columbia's faculty in 2008. He was also a visiting professor at the National Technical University of Athens.

Gourgouris' writings focus on the intersection between the poetics and politics of modernity and democracy. He has written extensively on Ancient Greek philosophy, political theory, and contemporary Greek culture and politics.
