= Richard Abel (cultural historian) =

American professor of silent cinema (born 1941)

Personal details
- Born: Richard Abel; August 20, 1941 Canton, Ohio, United States
- Education: University of Southern California; Utah State University
- Occupation: Professor Emeritus of International Film and Media at the University of Michigan
- Website: lsa.umich.edu/ftvm/people/emeriti/richabel.html

Richard Abel is Professor Emeritus of International Film and Media in the Department of Film, Television, and Media at the University of Michigan. He is a specialist in the history of silent film and pioneered the academic study of French silent film in the United States. Abel has authored numerous books and articles on a wide variety of topics including the rise and eclipse of French cinema, the early history of the U.S. cinema industry, early film exhibition, the emergence of film culture in newspapers, the contributions of early women writers and critics, and, more recently, the role of early westerns in re-enacting settler colonialism.

== Life ==
Born in Canton, Ohio, Abel enrolled in forestry and wildlife management at Utah State University but went on to obtain an undergraduate degree in English. He then pursued graduate studies in comparative literature at the University of Southern California where he earned his Ph.D. with a dissertation on T.S. Eliot ane Saint-John Perse. Abel taught for many years at Drake University in Des Moines, Iowa, and served successively as Director of Drake's Cultural Studies Program and of its Center for the Humanities. Both organized mini-conferences on subjects such as the Vietnam War: Contradictions in Cultural Representations, the Gulf War in Media Discourse, and Gender and Reception. In 2002, Abel and Barbara Hodgdon, an acclaimed scholar of Shakespeare, moved to the University of Michigan where he served as the Robert Altman Collegiate Professor of Film Studies in the Department of Screen Arts and Cultures (now the Department of Film, Television, and Media). He also served as the Department's Interim Chair and Director of its Graduate Program.

== Research ==
Although starting out in comparative literature, Abel's interests gradually shifted to film studies. In 1984, he published his first monograph, French Cinema: The First Wave, 1915-1929 (Princeton University Press). This ground-breaking history offers a reassessment of the forces operating in the French film industry, the development of narrative film genres, and the rise of an alternate cinema network to support avant-garde films.

As a follow-up, he edited a two-volume anthology on French Film Theory and Criticism, 1907-1939 (Princeton University Press, 1988). Recovering a neglected moment in French cultural history, these anthologies compiled a diverse selection of nearly one hundred and fifty important texts, most of them not previously available in English. Drawing on extensive archival research, The Ciné Goes to Town: French Cinema, 1896-1914 (University of California Press, 1994) is a detailed history of France's early world-wide prominence and is the fullest account in English.

Abel then published two studies on how American cinema eclipsed the economic and cultural predominance of French cinema in the U.S. The first, The Red Rooster Scare: Making Cinema American, 1900-1910 by (University of California Press, 1999) argues that Pathé 'Red Rooster' films made 'going to the movies' popular in vaudeville houses and nickelodeons until they were labelled 'foreign' as cinema became Americanized. The second study, Americanizing the Movies and 'Movie-Mad' Audiences (University of California Press, 2006), shows how the production of certain genres, along with distribution and exhibition practices, came to play a significant role in the construction of American identity in the pre-WWI period.

Following those two nation-focused books, Abel turned to more specific studies. Menus for Movie Land: Newspapers and the Emergence of American Film Culture, 1913-1916 (University of California, 2006), argues that newspaper pages, articles, and reviews (many written by women) negotiated among national, regional, and local interests to shape fans' ephemeral experience of moving-going.

Motor City Movie Culture, 1916-1925 (Indiana University Press, 2020) explores how the practices of local firms produced, distributed, exhibited, and publicized films in an effort to make movie-going a part of every life in the metropolitan city of Detroit and its diverse ethnic neighborhoods. Our Country/Whose Country: Early Westerns and Travel Films as Stories of Settler Colonialism (Oxford University Press, 2023) shows how westerns and travel films stage a remarkable vision of white settlers' westward expansion that reveal a transformation in what 'American Progress' came to mean. Abel's most recent monograph, The Exhibitor as Producer: Stage Prologues in American Movies Theatres, 1917-1926 (Palgrave Macmillan, 2024) recovers the unique theatrical practice that usually preceded a feature film and sometimes even became the main attraction that strongly affected an audience's movie-going experience.

Among Abel’s other edited books, some co-edited with colleagues, are three in particular. Encyclopedia of Early Cinema (Routledge, 2005/2010) is a unique one-volume reference work that, with more than 950 entries commissioned by international specialists, explores the first twenty-five years of cinema’s development from the early 1890s to the mid-1910s. Early Cinema:Critical Concepts (Routledge, 2014) in four volumes constitutes a mini-library of essential and often less than easily available texts, including primary documents, on the early years of cinema. Following on Menus for Movie Land, Abel authored Movie Mavens: US Newspaper Women Take on the Movies, 1914-1923 (University of Illinois Press, 2021) which offers a more specific collection of women editors and writers whose reviews and articles, sometimes with sharp wit and frank opinions, informed and entertained a wide readership, and especially women, hungry for news about their favorite stars, films, filmmakers, and others behind the scene.

His books won the Theatre Library Association Award in 1985, 1995 and 2006 and the Jay Leyda Prize in Cinema Studies in 1989. He also received NEH Fellowships in 1983, 2001, and 2011; an ACLS Fellowship in 1987; a National Humanities Center Fellowship in 1988; and a Guggenheim Fellowship in 1993.

Among his scores of essays, the 1995 SCS Katherine Singer Kovács Award went to his article, “Pathé Goes to Town: French Films Create a Market for the Nickelodeon” Cinema Journal 35.1 (Fall 1995): 3-26; and the 2021 IAMHIST-Routledge Prize to “The Middleman of the Movies,” Historical Journal of Film, Radio and Television 41.1 (2021): 641-664."

The Society for Cinema and Media Studies honored Abel with the Distinguished Career Award in 2014, and the Giornate del cinema muto did likewise with the Jean Mitry Award in 2017.

== Published Monographs ==
- Abel, Richard. French Cinema: The First Wave, 1915-1929. Princeton: Princeton University Press, 1984.
- Abel, Richard. The Ciné Goes to Town: French Cinema, 1896-1914. Berkeley: University of California Press, 1994.
- Abel, Richard. The Red Rooster Scare: Making Cinema American, 1900-1910. Berkeley: University of California Press, 1999.
- Abel, Richard. Americanizing the Movies and 'Movie-Mad' Audiences, 1910-1914. Berkeley: University of California Press, 2006.
- Abel, Richard. Menus for Movieland: Newspapers and the Emergence of American Film Culture, 1913-1916. Berkeley: University of California Press, 2015.
- Abel, Richard. Motor City Movie Culture. Bloomington: Indiana University Press, 2020.
- Abel, Richard. Our Country/Whose Country? Early Westerns and Travel Films as Stories of Settler Colonialism, Oxford: Oxford University Press, 2023.
- Abel, Richard. The Exhibitor as Producer: Stage Prologues in American Movie Theaters, 1917-1926. London: Palgrave Macmillan, 2024.

== Edited volumes ==
- Abel, Richard, ed. French Film Theory and Criticism. 2 vols. Princeton: Princeton University Press, 1988. Vol 1.: 1907-1929; Vol. 2: 1929-1939.
- Abel, Richard and Rick Altman, eds. The Sounds of Early Cinema. Bloomington: Indiana University Press, 2001.
- Abel, Richard, ed. Encyclopedia of Early Cinema. New York: Routledge, 2005.
- Abel, Richard, Giorgio Bertellini, and Rob King, eds. Early Cinema and the 'National'. East Barnet, United Kingdom: John Libbey Publishing, 2008.
- Abel, Richard, ed. Early Cinema, 4 vols. New York: Routledge, 2013.
- Hodgdon, Barbara, Ghostly Fragments, Richard Abel and Peter Holland, eds. Ann Arbor: University of Michigan Press, 2020.
- Abel, Richard, ed. Movie Mavens: US Newspaper Women Take on the Movies, 1914-1923. Champaign: University of Illinois Press, 2021.

== Awards and honors ==
- 2021 David H. Culbert IAMHIST-Routledge Prize for Best Article by an Established Scholar: “The Middleman of the Movies: US Film Exchanges, 1915-1919.”
- 2017 Jean Mitry Award, Giornate del cinema muto, Pordonenone (Italy)
- 2016 Huffington Post annual honor: Menus for Movieland, one of two best academic film books
- 2014 SCMS Distinguished Career Achievement Award
- 2006 Theatre Library Association Award: Americanizing the Movies and “Movie-Mad” Audiences: finalist for best book on recorded performance.
- 2005 Theatre Library Association Award for best book on recorded performance: for the Encyclopedia of Early Cinema.
- 1999 Kraszna-Kraus Moving Image Book Awards: finalist and special commendation for The Red Rooster Scare: Making Cinema American, 1900-1910.
- 1998 SCS Katherine Singer Kovács Award for best essay in cinema studies, 1995-1997: for "Pathé Goes to Town: French Films Create a Market for the Nickelodeon," Cinema Journal 35.1 (1995).
- 1995 Theatre Library Association Award for best book on recorded performance: for The Ciné Goes to Town: French Cinema, 1896-1914.
- 1989 Jay Leyda Prize in Cinema Studies: for French Film Theory and Criticism, 1907-1939.
- 1985 Theatre Library Association Award for best book on recorded performance for French Cinema: The First Wave, 1915-1929.
