= The CLR James Journal =

- Discipline: Philosophy
- Language: English
- Edited by: Paget Henry

Publication details
- History: 1990–present
- Publisher: Philosophy Documentation Center
- Frequency: Annual

Standard abbreviations
- ISO 4: CLR James J.

Indexing
- ISSN: 2167-4256 (print); 2325-856X (web)
- LCCN: sn92019752
- JSTOR: clrjamesj
- OCLC no.: 27125770

Links
- Journal homepage; Journal content with abstracts

The CLR James Journal is an annual peer-reviewed academic journal that publishes articles, reviews, and discussions relevant to the work and legacy of C. L. R. James. It was established in 1990 and the editor-in-chief is Paget Henry (Brown University). The journal is sponsored by the Caribbean Philosophical Association and published by the Philosophy Documentation Center.

== Abstracting and indexing ==
The journal is abstracted and indexed in EBSCO Summon, Philosophy Research Index, PhilPapers, and ProQuest Summon.

== See also ==
- List of philosophy journals
