= Ebenezer Obadare =

Nigerian-American academic and author

- Born: Ebenezer Babatunde Obadare
- Occupation: Academic researcher
- Title: Douglas Dillon Senior Fellow for Africa Studies

Academic background
- Education: Obafemi Awolowo University; (BA, MA); London School of Economics; (PhD)

Academic work
- Discipline: International Relations; Sociology; African Studies
- Sub-discipline: History
- Institutions: Council on Foreign Relations
- Main interests: Civil society, civic agency, and religiosity in Africa
- Notable works: Pentecostal Republic; Civic Agency in Africa

Ebenezer Babatunde Obadare is a Nigerian-American academic. He is the Douglas Dillon Senior Fellow for Africa Studies at the Council on Foreign Relations in Washington DC. Until 2021, he was a professor of Sociology at the University of Kansas, Lawrence, Kansas, United States. Obadare is a scholar of civil society, social change, religion in politics, and international relations.

== Education and career ==
Obadare was born in Nigeria where he had his bachelor's and master's degrees in History and International Relations at the Obafemi Awolowo University. During the tumultuous heydays of the Nigerian military junta between 1993 and 1995, he was a staff writer covering politics and current affairs for TheNEWS and TEMPO magazines. From 1995 to 2001, Obadare joined academia and taught international relations at his alma mater. He then moved to the London School of Economics and Political Science as a Ralf Dahrendorf Scholar and Ford Foundation International Scholar. He earned a doctorate degree (with distinction) in Social Policy, becoming a joint recipient of the Richard Titmuss Prize for Best PhD Thesis for the 2004/2005 academic session.

Obadare is the editor of the Journal of Modern African Studies, and a contributing editor of Current History. He is also on the editorial boards of several academic journals, including the Journal of Civil Society, Review of African Political Economy, Africa, Peace Building Review, and The Sociological Quarterly.

In January 2022, Obadare was appointed the Douglas Dillon Senior Fellow for Africa Studies at the Council on Foreign Relations (CFR) where he writes expert reports on socio-political affairs in its Africa Program. Before then, he was a faculty member in the Department of Sociology at the University of Kansas where he was also an affiliate faculty of the Kansas African Studies Center and the Center for Global and International Studies. Obadare is also a senior fellow at the New York University School of Professional Studies Center for Global Affairs, as well as a fellow at the University of South Africa's Research Institute for Theology and Religion.

== Research and publications ==
Obadare researches and publishes on religion and politics, civic engagement, citizenship and social change in Nigeria and Africa. His most recent book, Pastoral Power, Clerical State: Pentecostalism, Gender, and Sexuality in Nigeria was released in September 2022.

Synopsis of Pastoral Power, Clerical State

Obadare argues in the volume that Pentecostal churches and their leaders in Nigeria have become so ubiquitous that they efface state institutions and actors in the public space. This ascendance of Pentecostalism in Nigeria’s fourth republic was the focus of Ebenezer Obadare’s 2018 volume, Pentecostal Republic: Religion and the Struggle for State Power in Nigeria, and is now further elaborated in the most rigorous analytical framework in Pastoral Power, Clerical State: Pentecostalissm, Gender, and Sexuality. With focus on the intersecting dynamics of gender, class, and sexuality in the operations of Pentecostal churches and pastoral power in Nigeria, Obadare interrogates Pentecostalism as the most popular Christian de¬nomination and explores how it intertwines with politics, policy, popular cul¬ture, and the moral imagination. A crucial question Pastoral Power, Clerical State explores is the sociological conditions that account for the sudden rise to social visibility of Pen¬tecostal pastors. In tackling this question, Obadare argues that the loss of social prestige by the Nigerian intelligentsia (both on university campuses and outside the ivory tower) is the condition for the ascent of the Pentecostal pastor whose hegemonic power and social prestige in the Nigerian social landscape accumulate at the expense of the country’s intellectuals. But Obadare’s new book doesn’t posit a replacement theory that formulates a direction substitution between Nigerian men of God and its men of letters. Instead, he articulates a new order of elite authority that is based on the influence and power of a pastoral class rather than the rule of reason and established knowledge.

Obadare is the author of four other monographs, including:

- Pentecostal Republic: Religion and the Struggle for State Power in Nigeria (2018)
- Humor, Silence and Civil Society in Nigeria (2016)
- Civic Agency in Africa: Arts of Resistance in the 21st Century (2014)
- The Handbook of Civil Society in Africa (2014)

Together with Wale Adebanwi, Obadare has edited the following volumes:

- Governance and the Crisis of Rule in Contemporary Africa: Leadership in Transformation (2016)
- Democracy and Prebendalism in Nigeria: Critical Interpretations (2013).
- Nigeria at Fifty: Narrating the Nation (2011).
- Encountering the Nigerian State (2010).

He has written for Foreign Affairs, The Wall Street Journal, The New York Times, The National Interest, Foreign Policy, The Globe and Mail, The Free Press, and other prestigious outlets.
