= Wale Adebanwi =

Nigerian academic (born 1969)

- Born: Adewale Adebanwi; 1969 (age 56–57)
- Occupation: University professor

Academic background
- Education: University of Lagos, University of Ibadan, University of Cambridge

Academic work
- Discipline: Social Anthropology, Political Science
- Institutions: University of Pennsylvania
- Main interests: Identity politics, race relations, elites and cultural politics, spatial politics and social change

Wale Adebanwi (born 1969) is a Nigerian-born first Black Rhodes Professor at St Antony's College, Oxford where he was, until June 2021, a professor of race relations, and the director of the African Studies Centre, School of Interdisciplinary Area Studies, and a Governing Board Fellow. He is currently a Presidential Penn Compact Professor of Africana Studies at the University of Pennsylvania. Adebanwi's research focuses on a range of topics in the areas of social change, nationalism and ethnicity, race relations, identity politics, elites and cultural politics, democratic process, newspaper press and spatial politics in Africa.

== Education background ==
Wale Adebanwi graduated with a first degree in mass communication from the University of Lagos, and later earned his M.Sc. and Ph.D. in political science from the University of Ibadan. He also has an MPhil. and a Ph.D. in social anthropology from the University of Cambridge.

== Career ==
Adebanwi worked as a freelance reporter, writer, journalist, and editor for many newspapers and magazines before he joined the University of Ibadan's Department of Political Science as a lecturer and researcher. He was later appointed as an assistant professor in the African American and African Studies Department of the University of California, Davis, US. He became a full professor at UC Davis in 2016. Adebanwi was awarded the Guggenheim fellowship in 2024. He is the author of How to Become a Nigeria Big Man in Africa: Subalternity, Elites, and Ethnic Politics in Contemporary Nigeria (2024); Yoruba Elites and Ethnic Politics in Nigeria: Obafemi Awolowo and Corporate Agency (2014); Nation as Grand Narrative: The Nigerian Press and the Politics of Meaning (2016); and Authority Stealing: Anti-Corruption War and Democratic Politics in Nigeria (2012). He is the editor and co-editor of many books, including Democracy and Nigeria's Fourth Republic: Governance, Political Economy, and Party Politics 1999–2023 (2023); Everyday State and Democracy in Africa: Ethnographic Encounters (2022); Elites and the Politics of Accountability in Africa (2021); The Political Economy of Everyday Life in Africa: Beyond the Margins (2017); Writers and Social Thought in Africa (2016); and Democracy and Prebendalism in Nigeria: Critical Interpretations (2013).

Adebanwi was a co-editor of Africa: Journal of the International African Institute and the Journal of Contemporary African Studies.

== Works ==
His published works include:

- Nation as Grand Narrative: The Nigerian Press and the Politics of Meaning (University of Rochester Press, 2016)
- Yoruba Elites and Ethnic Politics in Nigeria: Obafemi Awolowo and Corporate Agency (Cambridge University Press, 2014)
- Authority Stealing: Anti-corruption War and Democratic Politics in Post-Military Nigeria (Carolina Academic Press, 2012)

In addition, he is the editor and co-editor of other books, including.

- The Political Economy of Everyday Life in Africa: Beyond the Margins (James Currey Publishers, 2017)
- Writers and Social Thought in Africa (Routledge, 2016)
- (co-edited with Ebenezer Obadare) Governance and the Crisis of Rule in Contemporary Africa (Palgrave Macmillan, 2016)
- (co-edited with Ebenezer Obadare) Democracy and Prebendalism in Nigeria: Critical Interpretations (Palgrave Macmillan, 2013).
- (co-edited with Ebenezer Obadare) Nigeria at Fifty: The Nation in Narration (Routledge, 2012)
- (co-edited with Ebenezer Obadare) Encountering the Nigerian State (Palgrave Macmillan, 2010).

== Awards ==
- Rhodes Professorship in Race Relations at Oxford School of Area and Global Studies, University of Oxford, UK.
- García, Kristina (11 April 2024). "Two Penn professors named 2024 Guggenheim Fellows". University of Pennsylvania Today.
- MacArthur Foundation ‘Research and Writing Grant’ (2005–2006)
- Rockefeller Fellowship (Academic Writing Residency, Bellagio Center, Italy) 2013
