= Giorgio Bertellini =

Italian-American media historian

Personal details
- Born: Giorgio Bertellini; May 13, 1967 (age 59) Mantua, Italy
- Education: Università Cattolica del Sacro Cuore; New York University
- Occupation: Professor of Film at University of Michigan
- Website: lsa.umich.edu/ftvm/people/faculty/giorgiob.html

Giorgio Bertellini an Italian-American media historian who specializes in the ways national and racial diversity informed American cinema's representation of citizenship, stardom, and leadership during the era of migrations, fascism, and World War II. He is currently Professor in the Department of Film, Television, and Media at the University of Michigan.

== Life ==
Born in Mantua, Italy, Bertellini studied philosophy at the Università Cattolica del Sacro Cuore and earned his Ph.D. in cinema studies at New York University Tisch School of the Arts. He moved to the University of Michigan, Ann Arbor, in 2001 as a Junior Fellow in the Michigan Society of Fellows and is currently Professor in the Department of Film, Television, and Media at the same institution with a courtesy appointment in the Department of Romance Languages. He was the Sargent-Faull Fellow at the Radcliffe Institute for Advanced Studies (2007–08) and a Tiro a Segno Fellow in New York University's Italian Studies department.

== Recognition ==
His work twice received the American Association of Italian Studies book award for film and media (2010 and 2020). His other book awards include the Robert K. Martin Best Book Prize (Canadian Association for American Studies, 2010), the Peter C. Rollins Book Award (Southwest Popular and American Culture Association, 2015), the IASA Book Award (Italian American Studies Association, 2020), and the Premio Internazionale di Letteratura Città di Como, 2023). His work has been supported by the American Philosophical Association, Consiglio Nazionale delle Ricerche, and the Radcliffe Institute for Advanced Studies. In 2022, he was selected as one of 180 Guggenheim fellows, a John Simon Guggenheim Memorial Foundation-sponsored scholarship.

== Works ==
- The Cinema of Italy. Wallflower Press, 2004/2007..ISBN 978-1903364994
- Early Cinema and the 'National': Early Cinema in Review: Proceedings of Domitor. (Co-edited with Richard Abel and Rob King). John Libbey Publishing, 2008. ASIN B01E9Z1P71
- Italy in Early American Cinema: Race, Landscape, and the Picturesque. Indiana University Press, 2009. ASIN B01FEL7QSI
- Emir Kusturica (Contemporary Film Directors). University of Illinois Press, 2015. ASIN B00JMOLQMGMilan: Editrice Il Castoro, 1996. ISBN 88-8033-072-1; 2nd expanded ed., 2001 ISBN 978-8880330721; English Edition: Champaign: University of Illinois Press, 2015. ASIN B00JMOLQMG; Romanian Edition: Bucharest: IBU Publishing, 2017.
- Italian Silent Cinema: A Reader. John Libbey Publishing, 2013.ISBN 978-0861966707
- The Divo and the Duce: Promoting Film Stardom and Political Leadership in 1920s America. University of California Press, 2019. ASIN B07MV7Z7RB
- Il Divo e il Duce. Fama, politica e pubblicità nell'America degli anni Venti. Florence: Le Monnier, 2022.ISBN 978-8800862936
