= Journal of Modern African Studies =

- Discipline: African studies
- Language: English
- Edited by: Corentin Cohen, Michael Ehis Odijie (2026-)

Publication details
- History: 1963–present
- Publisher: Cambridge University Press (United Kingdom)
- Impact factor: 1.7 (2025)

Standard abbreviations
- ISO 4: J. Mod. Afr. Stud.

Indexing
- ISSN: 0022-278X (print); 1469-7777 (web)
- LCCN: 2001-227388
- JSTOR: 0022278X
- OCLC no.: 48535892

Links
- Journal homepage

The Journal of Modern African Studies is a quarterly academic journal of African studies covering developments in modern African politics and society. Its main emphasis is on current issues in African politics, economies, societies, and international relations. The journal is published by Cambridge University Press.

The journal was created in 1963 by Helen Kimble and David Kimble in Dar El Salam and was then hosted at the University of East Africa. Helen and David Kimble served as founding editors from 1963, they edited the journal jointly until 1972 and then David Kimple served as main editor until 1997. The journal has been hosted in universities in Morocco, Lesotho, Malawi and in the United Kingdom.

As of 2026 its editors-in-chief are Corentin Cohen and Michael Ehis Odijie, both at the University of Oxford. Former editors include Ebenezer Obadare (Council on Foreign Relations) from 2017 to 2025 and Ian Taylor (St. Andrews University) from 2017 to 2021, Leonardo A. Villalón (University of Florida) and Paul Nugent (University of Edinburgh) edited the journal from 2012 to 2017, and Christopher Clapham (University of Cambridge) from 1997 to 2012.

== Abstracting and indexing ==
The journal is abstracted and indexed in:

- EBSCO databases
- International Bibliography of the Social Sciences
- ProQuest databases
- Scopus
- Social Sciences Citation Index

According to the Journal Citation Reports, the journal has a 2025 impact factor of 1.7.

== Notable articles ==
- "Diamonds or development? A structural assessment of Botswana's forty years of success" - Ellen Hillbom, Jun 2008 46:2, pp 191-214
- "China's engagement in Africa: scope, significance and consequences" - Denis M. Tull, Sep 2006 44:3, pp 459-479
- "The terrible toll of post-colonial ‘rebel movements’ in Africa: towards an explanation of the violence against the peasantry" Thandika Mkandawire, 2002 https://www.cambridge.org/core/journals/journal-of-modern-african-studies/article/abs/terrible-toll-of-postcolonial-rebel-movements-in-africa-towards-an-explanation-of-the-violence-against-the-peasantry/8B06D1254FDBFD9271164A55FC08931C
- "Explaining the 1994 genocide in Rwanda" - Helen M. Hintjens, Jun 1999 37:2, pp 241-286
- "The Anglophone Problem in Cameroon" Piet Konnings and Francis B Nyamnjoh, 1997 https://www.cambridge.org/core/journals/journal-of-modern-african-studies/article/abs/anglophone-problem-in-cameroon/4A049A5C478D5B63F31A0ADBF7EDEE4A
- "Informal Income Opportunities and Urban Employment in Ghana" Keith Hart, 1973 https://www.cambridge.org/core/journals/journal-of-modern-african-studies/article/abs/informal-income-opportunities-and-urban-employment-in-ghana/F440D34392BBF69D76543EB717A9FBB7 References
- "What is The Problem About Corruption?" Colin Leys 1963 https://www.cambridge.org/core/journals/journal-of-modern-african-studies/article/abs/what-is-the-problem-about-corruption/D1FCBCF5D6D51927DCB9C66B52046273
