= David Kimble =

David Bryant Kimble OBE (May 12, 1921 – March 8, 2009) was a British academic whose career was spent mostly in Tanzania, Botswana, Lesotho, Eswatini and Malawi. He was vice-chancellor of the University of Malawi from 1977 to 1987.

== Biographical details ==
Kimble was born in Horam, Sussex, into a family of Plymouth Brethren. He attended Eastbourne Grammar School and Reading University where he took a degree in modern studies, graduating in 1942 before taking a postgraduate diploma in education.

== Career ==
In the late 1940s Kimble took up the position of resident tutor in the Gold Coast (now Ghana).

In 1960 he was awarded a PhD by the University of London for his thesis on the rise of nationalism, forming the basis for his book The Political History of Ghana Vol 1: 1850–1928, published in 1962.

In 1962 Kimble became Professor of Political Science at the University College of Dar es Salaam; in 1966, he began a two-year stint as director of the Institute of Public Administration there. From 1968 to 1971 he was in Tangier at CAFRAD, an agency dedicated to improving public administration.

In 1971 he was appointed Professor in government and administration at the University of Botswana, Lesotho, and Swaziland.

In 1977 he was appointed Vice-Chancellor of the University of Malawi, and retired in 1987 to Devon, where he continued to edit the Journal of Modern African Studies. In all he edited or co-edited 35 annual volumes of the journal.

== Awards ==
Kimble was appointed OBE in 1962 for services to adult education, and was made an Officier de l’Ordre des Palmes Academiques in 1982.

== Sources ==
- David Kimble, Obituary, The Times
