= Mark Applebaum =

American composer (born 1967)

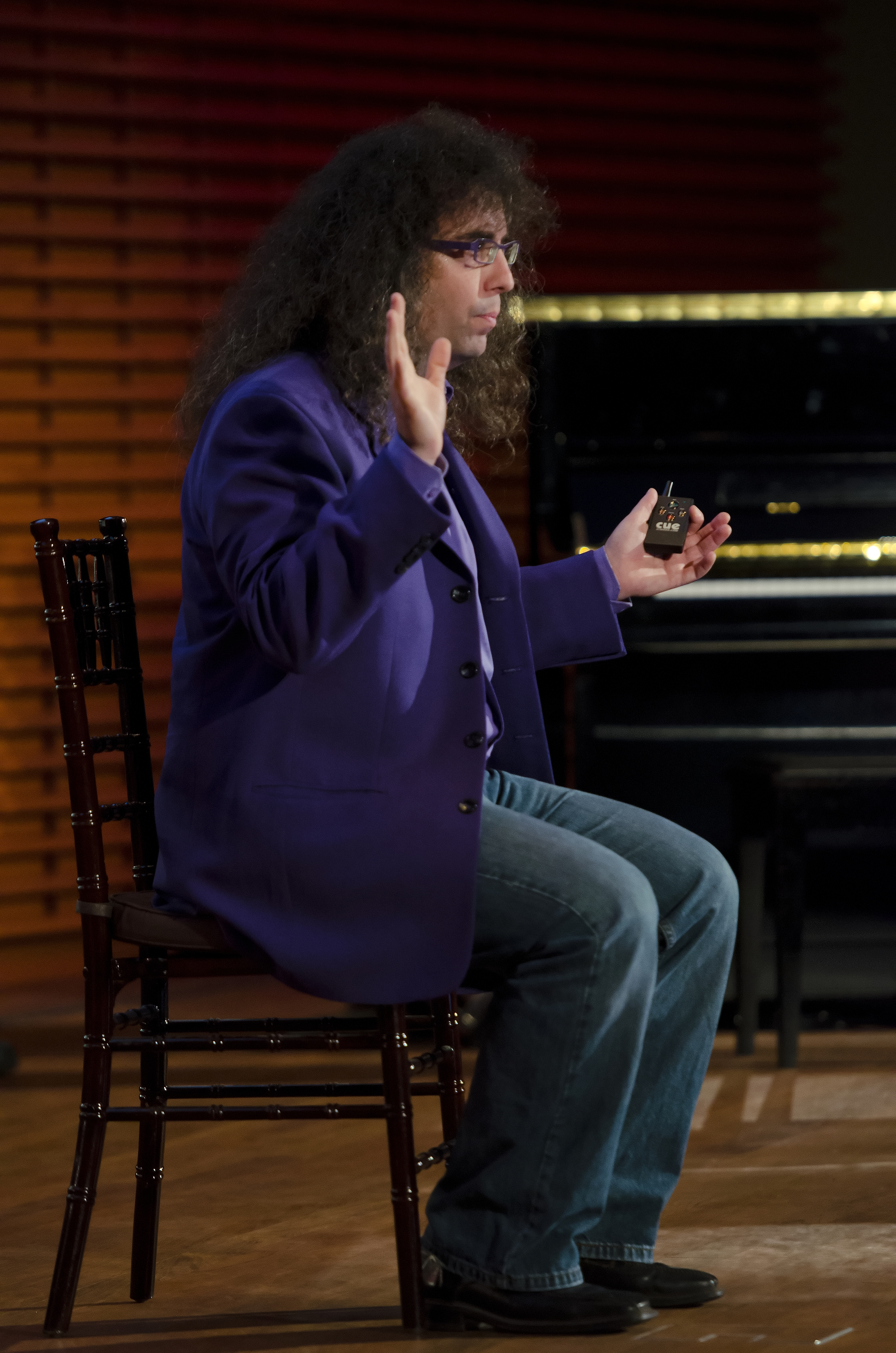
Mark Applebaum in 2012

Mark Applebaum (born 1967 in Chicago, Illinois) is an American composer and professor of music composition and theory at Stanford University.

== Biography ==
Applebaum received his PhD in music composition from the University of California, San Diego where he studied with Brian Ferneyhough, Joji Yuasa, Rand Steiger, and Roger Reynolds. Prior to Stanford, he taught at UCSD, Mississippi State University, and Carleton College.

Applebaum currently serves on Carleton's board of trustees.

Applebaum has received commissions from Betty Freeman, the Merce Cunningham Dance Company, the Fromm Foundation, the Kronos Quartet, the Paul Dresher Ensemble, Spoleto USA, the Vienna Modern Festival, Antwerp's Champ D'Action, Festival ADEvantgarde in Munich, Zeitgeist, Manufacture (Tokyo), the St. Lawrence String Quartet, the Jerome Foundation, and the American Composers Forum.

As a jazz pianist, Applebaum has performed around the world, including a solo recital in Ouagadougou, Burkina Faso that was sponsored by the American Embassy. In 1994, he received the jazz prize of the Southern California Jazz Society.

== Music ==
Applebaum's solo, chamber, choral, orchestral, operatic, and electro-acoustic work has been performed through North and South America, Europe, Australia, Africa, and Asia. His music has been described as mercurial, high detailed, discipline, and exacting, but also features improvisational and whimsical aspects. His inspiration has been drawn from jazz pioneers and maverick composers such as Conlon Nancarrow and Harry Partch, who found it necessary to use or invent unusual instruments to realize their artistic visions.

In 1990, Applebaum began building unique electroacoustic instruments. One of these instruments, which Applebaum refers to as the "Mouseketier," consists of threaded rods, nails, combs, doorstops, springs, squeaky wheels, ratchets, and a toilet tank flotation bulb. His first instrument, the "Mousetrap", is used in Mousetrap Music which features a recording of sound-sculpture improvisations. The objects on the instruments are plucked, scratched, bowed, and modified by a battery of live electronics.

Many of Applebaum's compositions are composed of visual and theatrical elements. Echolalia requires the rapid execution of 22 dadaist rituals, Straitjacket includes performers drawing on amplified easels, and Aphasia requires its performer to synchronize choreographed hand gestures to tape.

== Selected works ==
=== Orchestral music ===
- Dead White Males
- Skumfiduser!
- Martian Anthropology 1.2.3
- Sock Monkey
- Concerto for Florist and Orchestra

=== Choral music and opera ===
- Triple Concerto
- Martian Anthropology 4.5.6

=== Works for symphonic wind ensemble and jazz orchestra ===
- Ambitus
- Agitprop

=== Chamber music ===
- Sum = Parts for chamber orchestra
- 56 1/2 ft. for chamber orchestra
- Integrity for two percussion and piano
- Depth for trombone and contrabass
- Merit for wind quintet
- Seriousness for string trio
- Janus for ten players
- Nepotism for percussion and strings
- Catfish for percussion trio
- Scipio Wakes Up for sextet
- Martian Anthropology 7.8.9 for sextet
- Asylum for ten players
- The Blue Cloak for soloist and sextet
- Magnetic North for soloist and brass quintet
- Identity Destruction Sport for septet
- Accretion/Deletion for quintet
- 48 Objects for sixteen players
- Sixteen for sixteen players
- Mobile for Paper for any number of players
- The Composer's Middle Period for sextet
- Theme in Search of Variations I for percussion trio
- Theme in Search of Variations II for quintet
- Theme in Search of Variations III for quartet
- Straitjacket for percussion quintet
- Coat Room for octet
- Rabbit Hole for octet
- 30 for twelve percussionists
- The First Decade for percussion
- The Second Decade for percussion quartet
- The Third Decade for percussion septet
- Clicktrack for twelve percussionists
- Speed Dating for octet
- Control Freak for singer and septet
- Medium for quartet
- column facing on 3 behind lintel for quartet
- Mt. Moriah for string quartet
- 20 for string quartet
- Darmstadt Kindergarten for string quartet
- 1:00 for string quartet
- Hymn for saxophone quartet
- Tlön for three conductors
- Meditation for piano six hands
- 7 one-minute canons for flute, vibraphone, and cello
- Jetsam for piano trio
- Landscape for piano trio
- Go, Dog. Go! for percussion duo
- Gone, Dog. Gone! for percussion duo
- Ferneyhough ReMix for percussion duo
- On the Nature of the Modern Age for piano duo
- Unholy & Surreal for two pianos
- Speed Date for violin and cello
- Curb Weight Surgical Field duo for grand piano and two players
- Neo-Tribes for alto saxophone
- The Plate of Transition Nourishes the Chameleon Appetite for violin
- Anesthesia (+83) for viola
- Sargasso (83+) for cello
- Narcissus: Strata/Panacea for marimba
- Authenticity for trumpet
- Entre Funérailles I for trumpet
- Entre Funérailles II for vibraphone
- Entre Funérailles IV for flute
- Cadenza for piano
- Disciplines for piano
- Penumbra for piano
- Omnibus Etude for piano
- Elegy for carillon or piano
- DNA for guitar
- Pause for piano
- Aphasia for hand gestures and tape
- Composition Machine #1 for percussion
- Echolalia for amplified Dadaist rituals
- Zero-One for mousetrap sound-sculpture
- Skeletons in the Closet for 8-channel sound
- Wristwatch: Geology, Wristwatch: Alien Argot, Wristwatch: Meridian, Wristwatch: Rabbit Hole, Wristwatch: Speed Dating, Wristwatch: Control Freak for variable players

=== Tape music ===
- Pre-Composition
- The Janus ReMixes
- Snagglepuss ReMix
- Variations on Variations on a Theme by Mozart

=== Improvisation works ===
- The Metaphysics of Notation
- The Bible Without God
- S-tog
- Concerto for Florist and Ensemble
- Plundergraphic
- 5:3
- Intellectual Property
- 40 Cryptograms

== Discography ==
External videos
- Boredom, The Real Secret Behind Innovation, Mark Applebaum, published by Stanford University, TEDx Talk

- 1989 Your Parents Hate Me, Aphasia Records
- 1996 Mousetrap Music, Innova
- 1999 The Janus ReMixes, Innova
- 1999 Sonic Circuits VII, Innova
- 2002 The Apple Doesn't Fall Far from the Tree, Innova
- 2003 Cornucopia, Capstone
- 2003 Mark Applebaum: Intellectual Property, Innova
- 2003 Catfish, Tzadik
- 2004 Oni Buchanan: Solo Piano, Velvet Ear Records
- 2004 Martian Anthropology, Innova
- 2004 Disciplines, Innova
- 2005 56 1/2 ft., Innova
- 2005 The Bible Without God, Innova
- 2006 Asylum, Innova
- 2006, [re], Everglade
- 2008 Sock Monkey, Innova
- 2008 Escapement, Everglade
- 2010 The Metaphysics of Notation, Innova
- 2015 30, Innova
- 2018 Speed Dating, Innova
