= Frieda Ekotto =

Cameroonian writer

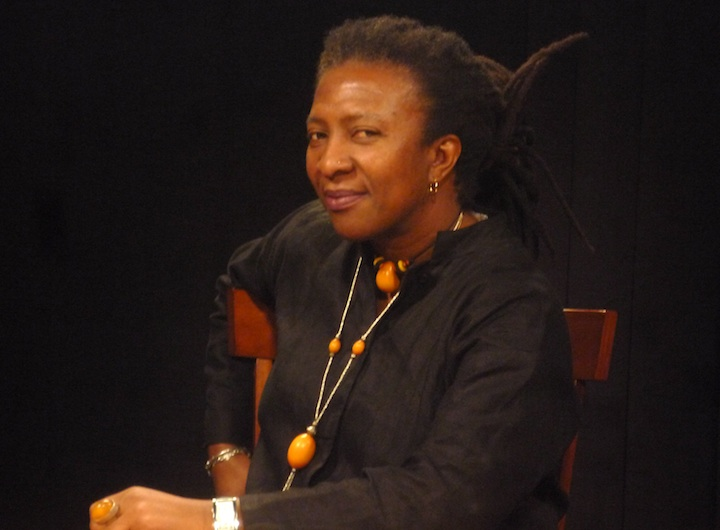
- Frieda Ekotto photographed by Robert Demilner
- Born: Cameroon
- Education: Colorado College (B.A>); University of Minnesota (PhD)
- Employer: University of Michigan

Frieda Ekotto is a Francophone African woman novelist and literary critic. She is Professor of AfroAmerican and African Studies and Comparative Literature at the University of Michigan and is currently the Hunting Family Fellow at the Institute for the Humanities. She is best known for her novels, which focus on gender and sexuality in Sub-Saharan Africa, and her work on the writer Jean Genet, particular her political analysis of his prison writing, and his impact as a race theorist in the Francophone world. Her research and teaching focuses on literature, film, race and law in the Francophone world, spanning France, Africa, the Caribbean and the Maghreb.

== Life ==
Frieda Ekotto was born in Cameroon and was raised in Switzerland. Ekotto received her B.A. from Colorado College in 1986, and her PhD in Comparative Literature from the University of Minnesota in 1994. She won the prestigious Chateaubriand fellowship to complete her dissertation. Ekotto began working at the University of Michigan at Ann Arbor in 1994. She has held faculty and leadership positions at the Concordia Language Villages in Minnesota, University of Technology, Sydney, Sichuan University, and the Consortium of Universities of Wisconsin, Indiana and Michigan in Aix-en-Provence, France.

== Creative writing ==
Ekotto's recent novel, Chuchote pas trop/Don't Whisper Too Much, was published by the major French publishing house L'Harmattan in 2005. The novel focuses on a love affair between two women, Siliki and Ada. Siliki is handicapped, and older than Ada, and the story chronicles their love and intimacy through writing as a common mode of communication. Siliki mean silk in Douala, Ekotto's first language. In an interview, Ekotto has said that the homoerotic content of the novel made it difficult to find a publisher in Africa, as it is the first positive depiction of love between women in the African context. Don't Whisper Too Much and Portrait of A Young Artiste from Bona Mbella, translated to English by Corine Tachtiris, were published by Bucknell University Press in 2019. Ekotto's writing has been said to have been heavily influenced by Jean Genet.

== Critical work ==
Ekotto's scholarly work covers Jean Genet and on film and literature in the Francophone world. In her first book, L’Ecriture carcérale et le discours juridique chez Genet/Prison Writing and Legal Discourse in Jean Genet (L'Harmattan, 2001), she studied the rhythms and rhetorical patterns of prisoners in French literature as a form of "minor literature", a category discussed by philosophers Gilles Deleuze and Félix Guattari. In this book, Ekotto discusses how prisoners depict the consequences of criminal prosecution and imprisonment using the codes of literary expression.

Her later work expands upon the production of criminality to discuss how race is produced and entrenched as a legal and political discourse. Her second book, What Color is Black? Race and Sex across the French Atlantic, (Lexington, 2011) argues that the French Atlantic has shaped notions of race, slavery and colonialism throughout the Atlantic World through contributing a distinctly French philosophical paradigm to the Civil Rights movement. Through literary and historical analysis of Jean Genet's play Les Nègres/The Blacks, Ekotto argues that Genet brings together both one of the most compelling signifiers of African-American pride and anger in the Civil Rights Movement and the Francophone Négritude movement.

Throughout all of her work, Ekotto has been interested in the aesthetic potential and limitations of cultural tropes. Her a recent edited collection on Jean Genet, Toutes Les Images du language: Jean Genet, capitalises on the concept of the stereotype in the institution. Ekotto has commented in an interview: "Confinement is a serious issue for me—and it is not just the confinement of being behind closed doors or in prisons or whatever. What I call confinement is the impossibility of feeling free, of being able to participate in the world without feeling constrained by one's race, one's gender, one's sexual orientation etc. In a sense you're never free to do what you want because of all the outside forces that control you and control everything else."

== Race and Sex across the French Atlantic ==
In Race and Sex across the French Atlantic, Ekotto unpacks Jean Genet's play Les Nègres/The Blacks in the 1960s United States to shed light on the Civil Rights Movement, riots in the Parisian banlieues (suburbs), and abstract French theatre. Through bringing these three events together, Ekotto argues that the French Atlantic represents "a fundamentally different philosophical and epistemological framework for articulations on black subjectivity throughout history."

Chapter one of the book focuses on the African-American playwright Lorraine Hansberry's response to Les Nègres/The Blacks. Chapter two traces the genealogy of the French term "nègre" and the English "nigger" and its creation of alterity in European and United States cultural discourse. The book's third chapter uses Faïze Guène's Kiffe, kiffe demain to link French colonial history to the 2009 Parisian riots. The final chapter performs a close reading of Dany Laferrière's Comment faire l'amour avec un nègre sans se fatiguer/How to Make Love to a Negro without Getting Tired to explore the role of sexuality in the formation of alterity. About this book, Roxanna Curto has written that "Ekotto makes a compelling argument for a trans-Atlantic approach, and skilfully illustrates how literary texts in French critique Western philosophy."

== Selected works ==
- Ekotto, F., 2011, Race and Sex across the French Atlantic: The Color of Black in Literary, Philosophical, and Theater Discourse (New York: Lexington Press). ISBN 0739141147
- Ekotto. F., and B. Boisseron (eds). 2011.Voix du monde: Nouvelles francophones (Bordeaux: Presses Universitaires de Bordeaux, France). ISBN 286781622X
- Ekotto, F., 2010, Portrait d’une jeune artiste de Bona Mbella (a novel, Paris: L'Harmattan).
- Ekotto, F., and Adeline Koh (eds). 2009. Rethinking Third Cinema: The Role of Anti-colonial Media and Aesthetics in Postmodernity. Germany: LIT Berlin. ISBN 3825818047
- Ekotto, F., Aurélie Renaud; Agnès Vannouvong. 2008. Toutes les images du langage: Jean Genet, Presse de l'Université de Paris Sorbone/Biblioteca Della Ricerca, Transatlantique 9.
- Ekotto, F., 2005, Chuchote pas trop (a novel; Paris: L'Harmattan). ISBN 2747589900
- Ekotto, F., 2001, L'Ecriture carcérale et le discours juridique: Jean Genet, Paris: L'Harmattan. ISBN 2747503135
- Ekotto, F., and M. Delvaux, 1998, Special issue of L'Esprit Créateur on the topic of "Narrative and Confinement".
- Ekotto, F., Don't Whisper Too Much and Portrait of A Young Artiste from Bona Mbella, English translation by Corine Tachtiris. (Bucknell University Press, 2019). ISBN 9781684480289
