= List of people with given name Lloyd =

This is a list of people with the given name Lloyd.

== A ==
- Lloyd Ahern (1905–1983), American cinematographer
- Lloyd Ahern II (born 1942), American cinematographer
- Lloyd Ailsby (1917–2007), Canadian ice hockey player
- Lloyd Aldrich (1886–1967), American politician
- Lloyd Alexander (1924–2007), American writer
- Lloyd Allen (born 1950), American baseball player
- Lloyd Allinson (born 1993), English footballer
- Lloyd St. Amand (born 1952), Canadian politician
- Lloyd Anderson (1902–2000), American business executive
- Lloyd Anderson (politician) (1925–2017), American politician
- Lloyd Andrews (ice hockey) (1894–1974), Canadian ice hockey player
- Lloyd Andrews (actor) (1906–1992), American actor, singer and composer
- Lloyd J. Andrews (1920–2014), 9th Washington superintendent of public instruction
- Lloyd Anoaʻi (born 1970), American professional wrestler
- Lloyd Appleton (1906–1999), American wrestler
- Lloyd Armstrong (1914–1959), Irish cricketer
- Lloyd Arntzen (born 1927), Canadian jazz musician
- Lloyd Ashby (1931–2025), New Zealand rugby union player
- Lloyd Ashley (born 1991), Welsh rugby union player
- Lloyd Aspinwall (1834–1886), American lawyer and soldier
- Lloyd Austin (born 1953), American U.S. Army general
- Lloyd James Austin (1915–1994), Australian linguist and literary scholar
- Lloyd Avant (born 2006), American football player
- Lloyd Avery II (1969–2005), American actor
- Lloyd Axworthy (born 1939), Canadian politician

== B ==
- Lloyd Babb (born 1966), Australian lawyer and prosecutor
- Lloyd Bacon (1889–1955), Actor, director
- Lloyd W. Bailey (1928–2020), American faithless elector
- Lloyd Hesketh Bamford-Hesketh (1788–1861), Welsh architect and antiquary
- Lloyd Banks (born 1982), American rapper
- Lloyd Barbee (1925–2002), American politician
- Lloyd Barber (1932–2011), Canadian politician
- Lloyd Barke (1916–1976), English footballer
- Lloyd Barker (umpire) (born 1943), Barbadian cricket umpire
- Lloyd Barker (footballer) (born 1970), Jamaican footballer
- Lloyd Barnes (born 1944), Jamaican record producer
- Lloyd Battista (born 1937), American actor and screenwriter
- Lloyd Batts (born 1951), American basketball player
- Lloyd R. Baumgart (1908–1985), American politician
- Lloyd Baxter (1923–2010), American football player
- Lloyd J. Beall (1808–1887), Commandant of the Confederate States Marine Corps
- Lloyd Bennett (1916–1995), Australian rules footballer
- Lloyd Bentsen (1921–2006), American politician
- Lloyd Berkner (1905–1967), American physicist and engineer
- Lloyd Berrell (1926–1957), New Zealand actor
- Lloyd W. Bertaud (1895–1927), American aviator
- Lloyd Bertram (1903–1971), Australian rules footballer
- Lloyd Best (1934–2007), Trinidad and Tobago politician
- Lloyd Biggle Jr. (1923–2002), American historian and writer
- Lloyd Binch (1931–2016), British cyclist
- Lloyd Binford (1869–1956), American film censor
- Lloyd C. Bird (1894–1978), American politician
- Lloyd Bishop (1890–1968), American baseball player
- Lloyd Bitzer (1931–2016), American rhetorician
- Lloyd Llewellyn Black (1889–1950), American judge
- Lloyd Blackman (musician) (1928–2014), Canadian violinist, conductor, composer
- Lloyd Blackman (footballer) (born 1983), English footballer
- Lloyd Blankfein (born 1954), American investment banker
- Lloyd Bochner (1924–2005), Canadian actor
- Lloyd Bond, American researcher
- Lloyd Borgers (born 1993), Dutch footballer
- Lloyd Bott (1917–2004), Australian public servant
- Lloyd Bourgeois (1903–1968), American triple jumper
- Lloyd Bourne (born 1958), American tennis player
- Lloyd Bowen, Welsh historian and academic
- Lloyd Wheaton Bowers (1859–1910), American lawyer
- Lloyd M. Bradfield (1901–1986), American football and basketball coach
- Lloyd Bradley (born 1955), British music journalist and author
- Lloyd Branson (1853–1925), American painter
- Lloyd Braun (born 1958), American media executive
- Lloyd Brazil (1906–1965), American basketball player-coach
- Lloyd Samuel Breadner (1894–1952), Canadian Chief of the Air Staff
- Lloyd Milton Brett (1856–1927), United States Army general
- Lloyd Brevett (1931–2012), Jamaican double bassist
- Lloyd Brewer (1929–2003), Australian rules footballer
- Lloyd Bridges (1913–1998), American actor
- Lloyd Donald Brinkman (1929–2015), American businessman and art collector
- Lloyd Brown (baseball) (1904–1974), American baseball player
- Lloyd Brown (veteran) (1901–2007), American centenarian
- Lloyd D. Brown (1892–1950), United States Army general
- Lloyd L. Brown (1913–2003), American journalist
- Lloyd O. Brown (1928–1993), American judge
- Lloyd Bruce (1907–1988), American baseball player
- Lloyd Bryce (1851–1917), American politician
- Lloyd M. Bucher (1927–2004), United States Navy officer
- Lloyd Budd (cricketer) (1913–1986), English cricketer and umpire
- Lloyd Burdick (1909–1945), American football player
- Lloyd Burgmann (born 1952), Australian rules footballer
- Lloyd Hudson Burke (1916–1988), American judge
- Lloyd L. Burke (1924–1999), US Army Medal of Honor recipient
- Lloyd Burns (born 1984), Wales international rugby union player
- Lloyd Burruss (born 1957), American football player
- Lloyd Butler (rower) (1924–1991), American rower
- Lloyd Butler (footballer) (born 1989), English footballer

== C ==
- Lloyd Cadena (1993–2020), Filipino YouTuber
- Lloyd Campbell-McBride (born 1982), Australian rugby union player
- Lloyd Campbell (general) (born 1947), Canadian air force general
- Lloyd Campbell (politician) (1868–1950), Northern Ireland business executive and politician
- Lloyd Campbell (curler) (1915–2016), Canadian curler
- Lloyd Cardwell (1913–1997), American football player and coach
- Lloyd Carins (1923–2007), Australian politician
- Lloyd B. Carleton (1872–1933), American actor, director, producer and writer
- Lloyd Carney (born 1962), American businessman
- Lloyd Carr (born 1945), American football player and coach
- Lloyd Carter (born 1959), American lacrosse coach and retired firefighter
- Lloyd Casner (1928–1965), American race car driver
- Lloyd Chadburn (1919–1944), Canadian WWII fighter pilot
- Lloyd Chalker (1883–1981), officer of the US Coast Guard
- Lloyd Chandler (1896–1978), American folk musician
- Lloyd H. Chandler (1867–1947), United States Navy admiral
- Lloyd Chapman (born 1949), American activist
- Lloyd Charmers (1938–2012), Jamaican singer and keyboardist
- Lloyd Cheatham (1919–1989), American football player
- Lloyd Lee Choi (born 1987), Canadian film director and screenwriter
- Lloyd Christenbury (1893–1944), American baseball player
- Lloyd Christie (born 1962), British boxer
- Lloyd Chukwuemeka, Nigerian politician
- Lloyd Clark (born 1967), Military historian and scholar
- Lloyd Clarke, Jamaican ska musician
- Lloyd Clayton Jr., American naturopath and wildlife conservationist
- Lloyd Cole (born 1961), English singer-songwriter
- Lloyd Colteryahn (1931–2011), American football player
- Lloyd Connelly (born 1945), American politician and judge from California
- Lloyd Conover (1923–2017), American inventor
- Lloyd Cook (1890–1964), Canadian ice hockey defenceman
- Lloyd Miller Cooke (1916–2001), American industrial chemist, researcher
- Lloyd Groff Copeman (1881–1956), American inventor
- Lloyd Cornelius (born 1943), Guyanese cricketer
- Lloyd Corrigan (1900–1969), American actor
- Lloyd Costello (1922–2001), Australian politician
- Lloyd Cotsen (1929–2017), American collector, philanthropist, and businessman
- Lloyd Cowan (1962–2021), British athlete and coach
- Lloyd Coxsone (born c. 1945), Jamaican record producer
- Lloyd R. Craighill (1886–1971), American missionary
- Lloyd Criss (1941–2020), American politician
- Lloyd Crosbie (born 1982), Australian murderer
- Lloyd Cross (1935–2015), American physicist and holographer
- Lloyd Crossley (1860–1926), New Zealand bishop
- Lloyd Crouse (1918–2007), Canadian politician
- Lloyd Cushenberry (born 1997), American football player
- Lloyd Cutler (1917–2005), American lawyer and White House Counsel

== D ==
- Lloyd Daley (1939–2018), Jamaican record producer
- Lloyd van Dams (1972–2021), Dutch–Surinamese kickboxer
- Lloyd Dane (1925–2015), American racing driver
- Lloyd Dangle (born 1961), American cartoonist
- Lloyd Daniels (born 1967), American basketball player
- Lloyd Davenport (1911–1985), American baseball player
- Lloyd Davies (1877–1957), Welsh footballer
- Lloyd G. Davies (1914–1957), American politician
- Lloyd E. Davis (1899–1955), American politician and farmer
- Lloyd Spencer Davis (born 1954), New Zealand-based author, filmmaker, scientist and science communicator
- Lloyd deMause (1931–2020), American thinker
- Lloyd Demetrius, American mathematician
- Lloyd DeVincenzi Sr. (1933–2001), Gibraltarian businessman and politician
- Lloyd Dines (1885–1964), American-Canadian mathematician
- Lloyd Dobyns (1936–2021), American journalist
- Lloyd Doesburg (1960–1989), Surinamese footballer
- Lloyd Doggett (born 1946), American politician and attorney
- Lloyd H. Donnell (1895–1997), American mechanical engineer
- Lloyd Doran (1921–1995), Canadian ice hockey player
- Lloyd Dorfman (born 1952), British entrepreneur and philanthropist
- Lloyd C. Douglas (1877–1951), American novelist
- Lloyd Doyley (born 1982), Footballer
- Lloyd Duffy (born 1944), Canadian jockey
- Lloyd Dumas (1891–1973), Australian journalist
- Lloyd J. Dumas (born 1945), American macroeconomist
- Lloyd Dunn (born 1957), American mixed-media artist and magazine publisher
- Lloyd L. Duxbury (1922–2002), American politician
- Lloyd Dyer (born 1982), English footballer

== E ==
- Lloyd Eaton (1918–2007), American football player, coach, and executive
- Lloyd Edwards (1883–1938), Australian rugby league footballer
- Lloyd Eisler (born 1963), Canadian pair skater
- Lloyd C. Elam (1928–2008), American psychiatrist
- Lloyd Ellams (born 1991), English footballer
- Lloyd Ellingson (1908–1946), American Nordic combined skier
- Lloyd Hartman Elliott (1918–2013), American educator
- Lloyd Embley (born 1966), British newspaper editor
- Lloyd Arthur Eshbach (1910–2003), American novelist
- Lloyd Esler (born 1957), New Zealand botanist and teacher
- Lloyd Espenschied (1889–1986), American engineer and inventor
- Lloyd Evans (rugby union, born 1995), English rugby union player
- Lloyd Evans (plant physiologist) (1927–2015), New Zealand plant physiologist
- Lloyd Evans (rugby union, born 1990), Welsh rugby union player
- Lloyd Evans (athlete) (1915–2002), Canadian long-distance runner
- Lloyd Everitt (born 1987), Welsh actor

== F ==
- Lloyd Fairbanks (born 1953), Canadian gridiron football player
- Lloyd Fairbrother (born 1991), English rugby player
- Lloyd Fallers (1925–1974), American anthropologist
- Lloyd Fell (1920–1981), Canadian politician
- Lloyd Noel Ferguson (1918–2011), American chemist
- Lloyd Fernando (1926–2008), Malaysian author and professor
- Lloyd Ferreira (born 1974), South African cricketer
- Lloyd Fields (born 1957), American politician
- Lloyd Finkbeiner (1920–1998), Canadian ice hockey player
- Lloyd Fletcher (1915–1991), American judge
- Lloyd Clark Fletcher, Australian murderer and rapist
- Lloyd Folkins (1913–1994), Canadian politician
- Lloyd David Foster (born 1952), American country music singer
- Lloyd Francis (1920–2007), Canadian politician
- Lloyd Frandsen (1948–2021), American politician
- Lloyd Fredendall (1883–1963), American general during World War II
- Lloyd A. Free (1908–1996), American pollster
- Lloyd William Morgan Freele, Canadian politician from Ontario
- Lloyd French (1900–1950), American film director
- Lloyd French (footballer) (born 1947), Australian rules footballer

== G ==
- Lloyd L. Gaines (1911–1939), Plaintiff in 1930s U.S. civil rights case who disappeared
- Lloyd Gardner (born 1934), American historian
- Lloyd Garrett (1886–1966), American songwriter
- Lloyd K. Garrison (1897–1991), American lawyer
- Lloyd Gaston (1929–2006), Canadian theologian
- Lloyd B. Gatchell (1901–1969), American philatelist
- Lloyd Geering (1918–2026), New Zealand theologian
- Lloyd D. George (1930–2020), American judge
- Lloyd R. George (1925–2012), American politician
- Lloyd P. Gerson (born 1948), American Neoplatonism scholar
- Lloyd Glasspool (born 1993), British tennis player
- Lloyd Glenn (1909–1985), American pianist, bandleader and arranger
- Lloyd Godman (1952–2023), New Zealand ecological artist
- Lloyd Lozes Goff (1908–1982), American painter
- Lloyd Goffe (1913–1984), British motorcycle speedway rider
- Lloyd Gold (born 1950), American screenwriter and playwright
- Lloyd Goldman (born 1958), American real estate developer
- Lloyd Goodrich (1897–1987), American art historian
- Lloyd Goodson (1943–2008), American musician
- Lloyd Gough (1907–1984), American actor
- Lloyd Graham (born 1949), Australian rugby union player
- Lloyd Saxon Graham (1922–2012), American epidemiologist
- Lloyd Greeff (born 1994), South African rugby union player
- Lloyd Green (born 1937), American pedal steel guitarist
- Lloyd Greer (1885–1952), American architect
- Lloyd E. Gressle (1918–1999), American Anglican bishop
- Lloyd Griffith (born 1973), English comedian, actor, presenter and singer
- Lloyd C. Griscom (1872–1959), American diplomat
- Lloyd Gronsdahl (1921–1989), Canadian ice hockey player
- Lloyd Gross (1905–1990), Canadian ice hockey player
- Lloyd Grove (born 1955), American journalist
- Lloyd Grow (1903–1979), American football and basketball coach
- Lloyd Guenther (1906–1995), American speed skater
- Lloyd Gullickson (1899–1982), American golfer
- Lloyd Guss (born 1959), Canadian hurdler
- Lloyd Gwam (1924–1965), Nigerian historian

== H ==
- Lloyd V. Hackley, American academic
- Lloyd Haddon (born 1938), Canadian ice hockey player
- Lloyd Haft (born 1946), American-born Dutch poet, translator, and sinologist
- Lloyd Hagger (1898–1968), Australian rules footballer
- Lloyd Hahn (1898–1983), American middle-distance runner
- Lloyd Hales (1921–1984), English cricketer
- Lloyd Hall-Thompson (1920–1992), Northern Irish politician
- Lloyd Hall (1894–1971), American chemist
- Lloyd Hamilton (1891–1935), American actor and comedian
- Lloyd Andrews Hamilton (1894–1918), American flying ace
- Lloyd Hampton (born 1941), Canadian politician
- Lloyd Nelson Hand (born 1929), American politician
- Lloyd Handley (born 1987), British screenwriter and film director
- Lloyd Harper (born 1949), Guyanese cricketer
- Lloyd Harris (tennis) (born 1997), South African tennis player
- Lloyd Harris (Canadian politician) (1867–1925), Canadian politician
- Lloyd Harris (American politician) (1895–1972), American politician
- Lloyd Harrison (born 1977), Jamaican gridiron football player
- Lloyd Hatton (born 1995), British Labour Party politician
- Lloyd C. Hawks (1911–1953), United States Army Medal of Honor recipient
- Lloyd Haynes (1934–1986), American actor
- Lloyd Hendrick (1908–1951), American lawyer and politician
- Lloyd Inman Hendricks (1942–2023), American politician
- Lloyd Henry, American politician
- Lloyd E. Herman (1936–2023), American museum planner and curator
- Lloyd Herrick, Maine state representative
- Lloyd Herring (1871–1922), Australian cricketer
- Lloyd Hibbert (born 1959), English boxer
- Lloyd Hildebrand (1870–1924), British-French cyclist
- Lloyd Hill (American football) (born 1972), American football player
- Lloyd Hinchberger (1930–2015), Canadian ice hockey player
- Lloyd Hines (1951/1952–2023), Canadian politician
- Lloyd Hittle (1924–2012), American baseball player
- Lloyd Hobson (born 1985), South African cricketer
- Lloyd Holder (born 1977), Bermudian footballer
- Lloyd Hollingsworth (1911–2004), American athletics coach
- Lloyd Holt (1937–2022), Canadian racing driver
- Lloyd Honeyghan (born 1960), British boxer
- Lloyd House (politician) (1931–2015), American politician
- Lloyd Howell Jr. (born 1966), American businessman and labor leader
- Lloyd Huck (1922–2012), American businessman
- Lloyd Hudson (1923–2015), Australian rugby league footballer
- Lloyd Hughes (actor) (1897–1958), American actor
- Lloyd Hughes (politician) (1912–1994), Australian politician
- Lloyd Herbert Hughes (1921–1943), American pilot
- Lloyd Hulbert (1918–1986), American botanist
- Lloyd Humphreys (1913–2003), American psychologist
- Lloyd Hunter (1910–1961), American trumpeter and bandleader
- Lloyd Hustvedt (1922–2004), American Scandinavian scholar and historian
- Lloyd Hyde (1920–1985), Canadian politician

== I ==
- Lloyd Iceton (1920–1994), English footballer
- Lloyd Ingraham (1874–1956), American actor and director
- Lloyd Irvin (born 1969), Jiu-Jitsu practitioner
- Lloyd Isgrove (born 1993), English footballer

== J ==
- Lloyd Jackson (ice hockey) (1912–1999), Canadian ice hockey player
- Lloyd Douglas Jackson (1888–1973), Canadian mayor
- Lloyd G. Jackson (1918–2011), American politician
- Lloyd G. Jackson II (born 1952), American lawyer and politician
- Lloyd Jacquet (1899–1970), Founder of Funnies, Inc., one of the first comic book "packagers"
- Lloyd James (footballer) (born 1988), Welsh football player
- Lloyd James (cricketer) (1937–2019), Bermudian cricketer
- Lloyd A. Jeffress (1900–1986), American scientist
- Lloyd Johansson (born 1985), Australia international rugby union player
- Lloyd Johnson (bobsleigh), American bobsledder
- Lloyd Johnson (businessman) (born 1945), English fashion entrepreneur
- Lloyd Johnson (baseball) (1910–1980), American baseball player
- Lloyd Johnson (footballer) (1913–2004), Australian rules footballer
- Lloyd Emmett Johnson (born 1945), Canadian politician
- Lloyd Johnston (born 2004), Australian rules footballer
- Lloyd Jones (New Zealand author) (born 1955), New Zealand writer
- Lloyd Jones (figure skater) (born 1988), Welsh-French ice dancer
- Lloyd Jones (English footballer) (born 1995), English footballer
- Lloyd Jones (socialist) (1811–1886), Irish union activist
- Lloyd Jones (Welsh writer) (1951–2026), Welsh novelist
- Lloyd Jones (Australian footballer) (1906–1990), Australian rules footballer
- Lloyd Jones (athlete) (1884–1971), American athlete
- Lloyd Jones (politician) (born 1937), American politician
- Lloyd Jones (magician) (1906–1984), American magician, pharmacist, book dealer and publisher
- Lloyd E. Jones (1889–1958), United States Army general
- Lloyd Kenyon Jones, American journalist, lecturer and author
- Lloyd Jordan (1900–1990), American sports coach
- Lloyd Josafat (born 1999), Filipino volleyball player
- Lloyd Joseph

== K ==
- Lloyd M. Kagey (1902–1977), American judge
- Lloyd Kahn (born 1935), American author, editor, carpenter
- Lloyd A. Karmeier (born 1940), American judge
- Lloyd Kasten (1905–1999), American Hispanist, medievalist, lexicographer, and Lusophile
- Lloyd Kaufman (born 1945), American film director
- Lloyd Kazapua (born 1989), Namibian footballer
- Lloyd Keaser (born 1950), American wrestler
- Lloyd Kelly (born 1998), English footballer
- Lloyd W. Kent (1907–1991), American architect
- Lloyd Kenyon, 1st Baron Kenyon (1732–1802), British politician and barrister
- Lloyd Kenyon, 3rd Baron Kenyon (1805–1869), British politician
- Lloyd Tyrell-Kenyon, 4th Baron Kenyon (1864–1927), British peer
- Lloyd Tyrell-Kenyon, 5th Baron Kenyon (1917–1993), British peer
- Lloyd Kerns (1921–1986), American politician
- Lloyd Kerry (born 1988), English footballer
- Lloyd Kim (born 1972), American Presbyterian minister
- Lloyd H. Kincaid (1925–2007), American politician
- Lloyd Klein (born 1967), French couturier
- Lloyd Klein (ice hockey) (1910–1966), Canadian ice hockey player
- Lloyd Knibb (1931–2011), Jamaican drummer
- Lloyd Koch (1931–2013), South African cricketer
- Lloyd M. Kozloff (1923–2012), American microbiologist and virologist
- Lloyd Kramer (born 1947), American filmmaker
- Lloyd Kropp (1937–2023), American novelist

== L ==
- Lloyd LaBeach (1922–1999), Panamanian sprinter and long jumper
- Lloyd LaCuesta, American journalist
- Lloyd Laing (archaeologist) (born 1944), British archaeologist
- Lloyd Laing (entrepreneur) (born 1978), Jamaican businessperson
- Lloyd Lambert (1928–1995), American R&B and jazz bandleader
- Lloyd Lamble (1914–2008), Australian actor
- Lloyd Lange (1937–2013), Australian politician
- Lloyd Langford (born 1983), Welsh comedian
- Lloyd Langlois (born 1962), Canadian freestyle skier
- Lloyd Christopher Lao, Filipino-Chinese Lawyer
- Lloyd Larsen, American politician
- Lloyd R. Leavitt Jr. (1928–2016), American Air Force lieutenant general
- Lloyd Lee (born 1976), American football player and coach
- Lloyd Leftwich (1832–1918), Alabama politician
- Lloyd Leith (1902–1979), American basketball referee and coach
- Lloyd Letherby (1900–1968), Canadian politician
- Lloyd Levin (born 1957), American film producer
- Lloyd E. Levine (born 1969), American politician
- Lloyd Levitin (born 1932), American businessman
- Lloyd A. Lewis, American theologian
- Lloyd E. Lewis Jr. (1926–2001), American politician
- Lloyd Lindroth (1931–1994), American harpist
- Lloyd Linton (born 1988), Rugby player
- Lloyd Lislevand (born 1969), Norwegian footballer
- Lloyd Llewellyn-Jones, Welsh historian
- Lloyd (singer) (born 1986), American singer
- Lloyd Loar (1886–1943), Mandolin designer and luthier
- Lloyd Lonergan (1870–1937), American screenwriter
- Lloyd Longfield (born 1956), Canadian politician
- Lloyd Steel Lourie (1877–1959), American orthodontist
- Lloyd Lovindeer (born 1948), Jamaican dancehall deejay
- Lloyd Lowndes Jr. (1845–1905), American politician
- Lloyd W. Lowrey (1903–1992), American politician

== M ==
- Lloyd MacInnis (1917–1965), Canadian television presenter
- Lloyd Macklin (born 1991), English footballer
- Lloyd Francis MacMahon (1912–1989), American judge
- Lloyd MacPhail (1920–1995), Canadian politician
- Lloyd Madden (1918–2011), American football player
- Lloyd Madsen (born 1986), South African field hockey player
- Lloyd Maines (born 1951), American country musician
- Lloyd Maitland (born 1957), English footballer
- Lloyd Mallan (1914–1973), American science writer
- Lloyd Mandeno (1888–1973), New Zealand electrical engineer
- Lloyd Mangrum (1914–1973), American professional golfer
- Lloyd B. Marsh (1893–1971), American politician
- Lloyd Marshall (1914–1997), American boxer
- Lloyd Martin (rugby league) (born 1955), New Zealand rugby league footballer
- Lloyd Mash (born 1981), Australian cricketer
- Lloyd A. Mashburn (1897–1963), Former U.S. Deputy Secretary of Labor
- Lloyd Mathews (1850–1901), Royal Navy officer
- Lloyd Mathias, Indian business executive and entrepreneur
- Lloyd Matowe, Zimbabwean pharmacist
- Lloyd Matthews, Canadian politician
- Lloyd Mayer (1952–2013), American gastroenterologist
- Lloyd McBride (1916–1983), American labor leader
- Lloyd G. McCarter (1917–1956), United States Army Medal of Honor recipient
- Lloyd McClendon (born 1959), American baseball player & coach
- Lloyd McCuiston (1918–2021), American politician
- Lloyd McDermott (1939–2019), Australian barrister and rugby union player
- Lloyd McDermott (gridiron football) (1925–1964), American football player
- Lloyd McGrath (born 1965), English footballer
- Lloyd McGuire (born 1947), British actor
- Lloyd McIntyre (1908–1984), Canadian ice hockey player
- Lloyd McMillian, American basketball player
- Lloyd McNeill (1935–2021), American musical artist
- Lloyd Meeds (1927–2005), American politician
- Lloyd Meek (born 1998), Australian rules footballer
- Lloyd Melville, Scottish politician
- Lloyd Merriman (1924–2004), American baseball player
- Lloyd Merritt (born 1933), American baseball player
- Lloyd Metzler (1913–1980), American economist
- Lloyd Middleton (1928–2015), Australian rules footballer
- Lloyd Miller (musician) (1938–2024), American jazz musician
- Lloyd Miller (athlete) (1915–1985), Australian triple jumper
- Lloyd Tevis Miller (1872–1951), American physician
- Lloyd Ray Milliken (1931–2025), American seafood entrepreneur and restaurateur
- Lloyd B. Minor (born 1957), American surgeon, researcher, and educator
- Lloyd Mints (1888–1989), American economist
- Lloyd Mohns (1921–2005), Canadian ice hockey player
- Lloyd Bryan Molander (born 1961), American film director
- Lloyd Mondory (born 1982), French road bicycle racer
- Lloyd Monsen (1931–2026), American sportsman
- Lloyd Monserratt (1966–2003), American activist
- Lloyd Montour (1925–2005), Canadian rower
- Lloyd Moore (1912–2008), American racing driver
- Lloyd Morain (1917–2010), American humanist
- Lloyd Morey (1886–1965), American politician
- Lloyd Morgan (born 1945), Jamaican cricketer
- Lloyd Morrell (1907–1996), English bishop of Lewes
- Lloyd Morrisett (1929–2023), American psychologist
- Lloyd N. Morrisett Sr. (1892–1981), American educator
- Lloyd Morrison (1957–2012), New Zealand investment banker
- Lloyd Moseby (born 1959), American baseball player
- Lloyd Motz (1909–2004), American astronomer
- Lloyd John Muller (1932–2023), Canadian politician
- Lloyd Mumphord (born 1946), American football player
- Lloyd Murad (born 1933), Venezuelan sprinter
- Lloyd M. Mustin (1911–1999), United States Navy admiral

== N ==
- Lloyd Neal (born 1950), American basketball player
- Lloyd Neidlinger (1901–1978), American football and ice hockey player
- Lloyd S. Nelson (1922–2013), American statistician
- Lloyd Kiva New (1916–2002), Cherokee fashion designer and educator
- Lloyd D. Newell (born 1956), American radio presenter
- Lloyd Newson (born 1957), Australian choreographer
- Lloyd W. Newton (born 1942), United States Air Force general
- Lloyd R. Ney (1893–1965), American painter and sculptor
- Lloyd Noel (1934–2017), Grenadian attorney
- Lloyd Nolan (1902–1985), American actor
- Lloyd Norris-Jones (born 1986), South African field hockey player
- Lloyd Nosler (1900–1985), American film director

== O ==
- Lloyd O'Neil (politician) (born 1937), Australian politician
- Lloyd O'Neil (publisher) (1928–1992), Australian publisher
- Lloyd John Ogilvie (1930–2019), American chaplain
- Lloyd Ohlin (1918–2008), American sociologist and criminologist
- Lloyd J. Old (1933–2011), American immunologist
- Lloyd Oliver (1923–2011), US Marine Corps Navajo Code Talker
- Lloyd Omdahl (1931–2024), American politician
- Lloyd Opara (born 1979), English footballer
- Lloyd Osbourne (1868–1947), American novelist
- Lloyd Owen (born 1966), English actor
- Lloyd Owers (born 1989), English football coach
- Lloyd Owusu (born 1976), English-Ghanaian footballer

== P ==
- Lloyd Palun (born 1988), French footballer
- Lloyd Pandi (born 1999), Canadian basketball player
- Lloyd Parks (born 1949), Jamaican reggae vocalist and bass player
- Lloyd Parks (R&B singer), American R&B/soul singer
- Lloyd Parrott, Canadian politician
- Lloyd Parsons (1918–1986), American football player
- Lloyd Pate (born 1946), American football player
- Lloyd Paternott (born 1992), English cricketer
- Lloyd H. Paterson (1925–1988), American businessman and politician
- Lloyd Patterson (born 1957), American gridiron football player
- Lloyd Paxton, British airline CEO
- Lloyd Pearson (1897–1966), English actor
- Lloyd Peck, British physiologist
- Lloyd Peever (born 1971), American baseball player
- Lloyd Percival (1913–1974), Canadian athlete, coach, broadcaster and author
- Lloyd Howard Perkins (1923–1999), American Mormon bishop
- Lloyd Perrett (born 1994), NZ rugby league footballer
- Lloyd Peterson (1900–1986), American sports coach
- Lloyd Pettit (1927–2003), American sportscaster
- Lloyd Phillips (1949–2013), New Zealand film producer
- Lloyd Phiri (born 1985), Malawian musician
- Lloyd Montgomery Pidgeon (1903–1999), Canadian chemist
- Lloyd Pierce (born 1976), American basketball coach
- Lloyd Piper (1923–1983), Australian cartoonist and art teacher
- Lloyd Pixley (1900–1954), American football player
- Lloyd Pollock (1909–1993), Canadian ice hockey administrator and businessman
- Lloyd Pope (born 1999), Australian cricketer
- Lloyd Powell (1888–1975), English pianist
- Lloyd Price (1933–2021), American rock and roll singer
- Lloyd Price (politician) (1920–2007), Canadian politician from Ontario
- Lloyd Turton Price (1873–1933), Scottish surgeon
- Lloyd T. Pullen (1825–1908), American politician
- Lloyd Pye (1946–2013), American novelist

== Q ==
- Lloyd Quarterman (1918–1982), American biochemist
- Lloyd Quinan (born 1957), Scottish politician

== R ==
- Lloyd E. Rader Sr. (1906–1986), American state government official
- Lloyd Raffetto (1897–1988), American ice cream innovator, entrepreneur, banker from Placerville
- Lloyd B. Ramsey (1918–2016), American army general officer, major-general
- Lloyd Rayney (born 1962), Australian barrister and prosecutor
- Lloyd Read (born 1990), Welsh racing driver
- Lloyd Reckord (1929–2015), Jamaican actor and director
- Lloyd Reece (born 1957–58), Jamaican musician
- Lloyd Rees (1895–1988), Australian landscape painter
- Lloyd Reese (1920–1981), American gridiron football player
- Lloyd J. Reynolds (1902–1978), American calligrapher and professor
- Lloyd Rice (1928–1996), Canadian canoeist
- Lloyd Richards (1919–2006), American theater director
- Lloyd Richards (footballer) (born 1958), Jamaican footballer
- Lloyd Devereux Richards, American writer
- Lloyd J. Richardson (born 1950), Sint Maarten politician
- Lloyd L. Richardson (1915–2002), American screenwriter and film director
- Lloyd Stephen Riford Jr. (1924–2025), American politician
- Lloyd Rigby (born 1989), English footballer
- Lloyd Rigler (1915–2003), American businessman and philanthropist
- Lloyd Roberts (politician) (1907–1961), Australian politician
- Lloyd Robertson (born 1934), Canadian journalist and former news anchor
- Lloyd M. Robinette (1881–1951), American politician
- Lloyd Robinson (footballer) (1918–1967), Australian rules footballer
- Lloyd Robinson (cricketer) (1912–1996), Welsh cricketer
- Lloyd Robson (1931–1990), Australian historian and academic
- Lloyd Roby (born 1999), English rugby league player
- Lloyd Rodgers (1942–2016), American composer, performer and teacher
- Lloyd Rose, American novelist
- Lloyd Emerson Roulet (1891–1985), American politician
- Lloyd Rowland, US Air Force NGA deputy director
- Lloyd Ruby (1928–2009), American racing driver
- Lloyd Rudge (1934–1990), English cricketer
- Lloyd Rudolph (1927–2016), American political economist and political scientist
- Lloyd Russell-Moyle (born 1986), British politician
- Lloyd Russell (1913–1968), American baseball, football, track and basketball player
- Lloyd Ryan, British jazz drummer

== S ==
- Lloyd Sabin (born 1994), English cricketer
- Lloyd Saltman (born 1985), Scottish golfer
- Lloyd Sam (born 1984), Ghanaian-English footballer
- Lloyd Samartino (born 1960), Filipino actor
- Lloyd Charles Sanders (1857–1927), English author
- Lloyd Erskine Sandiford (1937–2023), Prime Minister of Barbados from 1987 to 1994
- Lloyd Sauder (1950–2021), Canadian politician
- Lloyd Saunders (1897–1984), New Zealand cricketer
- Lloyd Saxton (born 1990), Swedish-English footballer
- Lloyd Schermer (born 1927), American businessman and artist
- Lloyd Schmeiser (1921–2013), American politician
- Lloyd Schwartz (born 1941), American poet and professor
- Lloyd J. Schwartz (born 1946), American television producer and writer
- Lloyd Scott (born 1961), English charity fundraiser
- Lloyd Scott (musician) (1902–2000), American jazz musician
- Lloyd Scott (baseball) (fl. 1930s), American baseball player
- Lloyd Sealy (1917–1985), NYPD Officer
- Lloyd Searwar (1925–2006), Guyanese writer
- Lloyd Seay (1919–1941), American stock car racing driver
- Lloyd Segan, American film producer
- Lloyd Seibert (1889–1972), United States Army Medal of Honor recipient
- Lloyd Sexton Jr. (1912–1990), American painter
- Lloyd Shapley (1923–2016), American mathematician
- Lloyd Stowell Shapley (1875–1969), Naval Governor of Guam from 1926 to 1929
- Lloyd Sharpin (1879–1921), Anglican archdeacon
- Lloyd Sharrar (1936–1984), American basketball player
- Lloyd Shaw (educator) (1890–1958), American choreographer
- Lloyd R. Shaw (1914–1993), Canadian businessman and politician
- Lloyd Shearer (1916–2001), American celebrity gossip columnist
- Lloyd Sherr (born 1956), American actor
- Lloyd Herbert Shinners (1918–1971), Canadian-American botanist
- Lloyd A. Simandl (born 1948), Czech-Canadian filmmaker
- Lloyd Simmons, American baseball coach
- Lloyd Sisco (born 1941), American football coach
- Lloyd Sluman (born 1952), English cricketer
- Lloyd Smith (cricketer) (1928–2004), Australian cricketer
- Lloyd M. Smith (born 1954), American chemistry academic
- Lloyd R. Smith (1911–1978), American politician
- Lloyd Smucker (born 1964), American politician
- Lloyd Snelgrove (born 1956), Canadian politician
- Lloyd Snow (born 1943), Canadian politician
- Lloyd Sommerlad (1919–2014), Australian politician
- Lloyd Spencer (1893–1981), American politician
- Lloyd Spiegel (born 1979), Australian blues guitarist, singer, and songwriter
- Lloyd Spooner (1884–1966), American sport shooter
- Lloyd Stalder (1888–1978), American politician
- Lloyd Stanton (born 1965), British film producer
- Lloyd C. Stark (1886–1972), American businessman and politician
- Lloyd Stearman (1898–1975), American aviator, aircraft designer and entrepreneur
- Lloyd Stein (1907–1987), American football player and trainer
- Lloyd Stephenson (born 1981), New Zealand field hockey player
- Lloyd Stinson (1904–1976), Canadian politician
- Lloyd Stone (1912–1993), American poet, illustrator, and composer
- Lloyd Stovall (1911–1983), American football player, coach, and administrator
- Lloyd Strickland (born 1973), British philosopher and intellectual historian
- Lloyd Paul Stryker (1885–1955), American lawyer
- Lloyd Suh (born 1975), American playwright
- Lloyd Swanton (born 1960), Australian jazz double bassist

== T ==
- Lloyd Tayler (1830–1900), Australian architect
- Lloyd George Teekell (1922–1996), American politician
- Lloyd Tennant (born 1968), English cricketer
- Lloyd Tevis (1824–1899), American businessman
- Lloyd Thaxton (1927–2008), American writer, producer, director and pop music TV host
- Lloyd A. Thompson (1932–1997), Nigerian academic
- Lloyd Thomson (1919–2015), Australian public servant and diplomat
- Lloyd Thurston (1880–1970), American politician
- Lloyd Tilghman (1816–1863), Confederate States Army general
- Lloyd Titus, American architect
- Lloyd Tombleson (1883–1951), American educator, farmer and politician
- Lloyd Trammell (born 1953), American inventor
- Lloyd M. Trefethen (1919–2001), American fluid dynamicist
- Lloyd Trigg (1914–1943), Recipient of the Victoria Cross
- Lloyd Trotman (1923–2007), American musician
- Lloyd Turner (journalist) (1938–1996), British journalist
- Lloyd Turner (1884–1976), Canadian ice hockey pioneer

== U ==
- Lloyd Ultan (historian) (born 1938), American historian
- Lloyd Ultan (composer) (1929–1998), American composer
- Lloyd Upsdell, British Paralympic athlete

== V ==
- Lloyd Valberg (1922–1997), Singaporean high jumper
- Lloyd E. Varden (1911–1970), American photography expert
- Lloyd Vaughan (1909–1988), American animator
- Lloyd Voss (1942–2007), American football player

== W ==
- Lloyd Wade, British singer
- Lloyd Walker (rugby union) (born 1959), Australian rugby union international
- Lloyd Wallace (born 1995), British freestyle skier
- Lloyd Walton (born 1953), American basketball player
- Lloyd Waner (1906–1982), American baseball player
- Lloyd Warbey, English television presenter
- Lloyd B. Waring (1902–1997), American banker, politician
- Lloyd Warren (1868–1922), French-born American architect
- Lloyd Earl Warren (1896–1934), American politician
- Lloyd Wasserbach (1921–1949), American football player
- Lloyd F. Weeks (1932–2002), American politician
- Lloyd Weier (1938–2013), Australia international rugby league footballer
- Lloyd L. Weinreb (1936–2021), American law professor
- Lloyd R. Welch (1927–2023), American information theorist
- Lloyd R. Welch (Cherokee chief) (1875–1880), Principal Chief of the Eastern Band of Cherokee Indians
- Lloyd Wells (born 1938), American jazz guitarist, composer and arranger
- Lloyd C. A. Wells (1924–2005), American football scout
- Lloyd Wendt (1908–2007), American journalist
- Lloyd Wescott (1907–1990), American Agriculturalist
- Lloyd F. Wheat (1923–2004), American politician
- Lloyd Garrison Wheeler (1848–1909), African-American attorney
- Lloyd White (rugby league) (born 1988), Wales international rugby league footballer
- Lloyd White (diplomat) (1918–1981), New Zealand diplomat and public servant
- Lloyd Whitlock (1891–1966), American actor
- Lloyd Christ Wicke (1901–1996), American Methodist bishop
- Lloyd Wickett (1920–2001), American football player
- Lloyd Williams (rugby union, born 1989), Wales international rugby union player
- Lloyd Williams (businessman) (born 1940), Australian property developer
- Lloyd Williams (rugby union, born 1933) (1933–2017), Wales international rugby union player
- Lloyd Williams (filmmaker) (born 1940), American experimental filmmaker
- Lloyd Williams (footballer) (born 1934), Australian rules footballer
- Lloyd Williams (Welsh cricketer) (1925–2007), Welsh cricketer and schoolmaster
- Lloyd Williams (Jamaican cricketer) (born 1939), Jamaican cricketer
- Lloyd Williams (singer), Jamaican reggae singer of the 1960s
- Lloyd A. Williams (1945–2025), American community leader
- Lloyd George Williams (1927–2008), Jamaican judge
- Lloyd W. Williams (1887–1918), United States Marine Corps officer
- Lloyd Winnecke (born 1960), American politician
- Lloyd Winston (born 1939), American football player
- Louis Lloyd Winter (1924–1965), Canadian businessman
- Lloyd Spotted Wolf, American football player and coach
- Lloyd Wolfe, American football and basketball player
- Lloyd Wood (director), British theatre and opera director
- Lloyd H. Wood (1896–1964), American politician
- Lloyd Woodard (born 1984), American mixed martial arts fighter
- Lloyd R. Woodson (born 1966), American convict
- Lloyd Woolf (born 1981), British comedy actor and writer
- Lloyd Wootton (1927–1989), Canadian lacrosse player
- Lloyd Wright (1890–1978), American architect
- Lloyd Wulf (1913–1965), American artist

== Y ==
- Lloyd Yoder (1903–1967), American football player
- Lloyd Young (1903–1978), American football player
- Lloyd Lindsay Young (born 1941), American weather presenter
- Lloyd Youngblood (born 1946), American neurosurgeon

== Z ==
- Lloyd Zaragoza (born 1982), Filipino actor
- Lloyd Ziff (1942–2024), American photographer and art director
- Lloyd Zucker (1929–2009), Australian rules footballer
- Lloyd Zvasiya (born 1981), Zimbabwean sprinter

== Fictional characters ==
- Lloyd Asplund, in the anime series Code Geass
- Lloyd Bloch, in the Marvel Comics universe
- Lloyd Braun (Seinfeld), in the NBC sitcom, Seinfeld
- Llwyd ap Cil Coed, in the story Mabinogion
- Lloyd Garmadon, in the animated TV series Ninjago
- Lloyd Henreid, in Stephen King's The Stand
- Lloyd Tavernier, in the BBC soap opera EastEnders
- Lloyd the Delivery Guy, in the TV series Scrubs

== See also ==
- List of people with surname Lloyd
- Loyd (disambiguation), includes a list of people with the given name Loyd
