= Burning Up =

Burning Up or Burnin' Up may refer to:

== Books ==
- Burning Up, romance novel by Susan Andersen
- Burning Up, romance novel by Caroline B. Cooney
- Burning Up, romance novel omnibus by Angela Knight, Nalini Singh, Virginia Kantra and Meljean Brook

== Film ==
- Burning Up (film), a 1930 Paramount Pictures film about a racing car driver

== Music ==
- Burning Up (album), 1995 album by Sizzla
- "Burnin' Up" (Imagination song), 1981
- "Burnin' Up" (Jessie J song), 2014
- "Burning Up" (Madonna song), 1982
- "Burning Up" (Ne-Yo song), 2012
- "Burnin' Up" (Jonas Brothers song), 2008
- "Burnin' Up" (Faith Evans song), 2001
- "Burnin' Up", song by Judas Priest from the album, Killing Machine
- "Burning Up", single by Lloyd Williams, 1960s
- "Burning Up", single by Billy Young, 1960s
- "Burning Up", single by Carlene Davis, Y. Shaka Shaka, 1988
- "Burnin Up", song by Ken Carson from Project X
- "Burning Up", song by Kylie Minogue from Fever
- "Burning Up", song by Mi-Sex, D. Martin, K. Stanton, S. Gilpin, R. Hodgkinson 1979 from Space Race
- "Burning Up", song by Tygers of Pan Tang, Weir, Cox, Laws, Dick 1980 from Wild Cat
- "Burning Up", song by Ladytron from Velocifero
- "Burnin' Up", song by Mungo Jerry, written Ray Dorset 1974
- “Burning Up”, song by Donnell Pitman, which appears in Stranger Things Season 4
