= Aditya Ghosh =

Indian businessman

- Born: Kolkata, West Bengal, India
- Citizenship: Indian
- Education: (B.A.); Kirori Mal College (L.L.B.); Faculty of Law, University of Delhi (AMP); Harvard Business School
- Occupation: Businessman
- Known for: Former president IndiGo airline Co-Founder of Akasa Air

Aditya Ghosh is an Indian lawyer-turned-businessman working primarily in the civil aviation and hospitality industries. He was the former president and whole time director of IndiGo from 2008 to 2018. He is the co-founder of Akasa Air with Vinay Dube. Ghosh was also the CEO of OYO Hotel & Homes, South Asia and currently serves as a member of its board. He is a member of the board of management at Ashoka University and a visiting faculty at the university's Department of Entrepreneurship.

== Early life and education ==
Ghosh was born in Kolkata, West Bengal, into a Bengali family, and raised in Delhi. He is a son of an Indian Administrative Service officer. He graduated with an LLB degree from Faculty of Law, University of Delhi and completed his B.A degree from Kirori Mal College of Delhi University.

== Career ==
Ghosh started his career in 1997 by joining J. Sagar Associates, a law firm. He later worked at InterGlobe Enterprises as Group General Counsel followed by IndiGo as the President and whole time director. Under him, IndiGo reached a market capitalisation of 55,000 crore. After ten years, in 2018, he resigned from IndiGo. In the same year on 1 December, he was appointed as the CEO of OYO hotels in India and South Asia.

In 2020, he joined Fabindia as a member of its board of directors. In 2021, he collaborated with his friend Anjan Chatterjee and opened a restaurant named Chourangi in London.

In December 2021, he co-founded Akasa Air along with Vinay Dube. The airline began its operation on 7 August 2022 from Mumbai to Ahmedabad. As of February 2024, the airline has 24 aircraft flying to 19 destinations. Dube holds a 10% stake in the airline.

== Personal life ==
Aditya Ghosh is married to Manavi Ghosh.

== Awards ==
- Low Cost Leadership Award at World Airlines awards in 2011.
- GQ Businessman of the Year award in 2013.
- CEO of the Year award by SABRE in 2013.
- Ghosh ranked 27th globally in Fortune 40 UNDER 40 list of businesspersons.
- CEO of the year’ award by SABRE.

== See also ==
- Ajay Singh, Indian businessman, Chairman and Managing Director of SpiceJet
- Lloyd Mathias, Indian business executive and an entrepreneur
