= Lloyd Laing =

Lloyd Laing may refer to:

- Lloyd Laing (archaeologist)
- Lloyd Laing (entrepreneur)
