= Rhys Lloyd =

Rhys Lloyd may refer to:

- Rhys Lloyd (American football) (born 1982) British American-football player
- Rhys Lloyd, Baron Lloyd of Kilgerran (1907–1991), Welsh Liberal Party politician
- Rhys Lloyd (cyclist), Welsh bicyclist at the 2010 Commonwealth Games in cycling men's team pursuit
- Rhys Lloyd of Bronwydd (17th century) 1632 High Sheriff of Cardiganshire

== See also ==
- Evan Alwyn Rhys Lloyd, of Tynbwlch, Llanddeiniol, Llanrhystyd, Cardigan; the 1948 High Sheriff of Cardiganshire
- Lloyd (disambiguation)
- Rhys (name)
