= Lloyd Johnson =

Lloyd Johnson may refer to:

- Lloyd Johnson (fashion retailer) (born 1945), English fashion entrepreneur
- Lloyd Johnson (baseball) (1910–1980), Major League Baseball pitcher
- Lloyd Johnson (bobsleigh), American bobsledder
- Lloyd Johnson (footballer) (1913–2004), Australian footballer
- Lloyd Emmett Johnson (born 1945), Canadian politician
- Lloyd Johnson (sprinter), winner of the 1977 NCAA Division I outdoor 4 × 400 meter relay championship

== See also ==
- Tebbs Lloyd Johnson (1900–1984), British speedwalker
- Lloyd (disambiguation)
- Johnson (disambiguation)
