= Akasa Air =

Indian low-cost airline

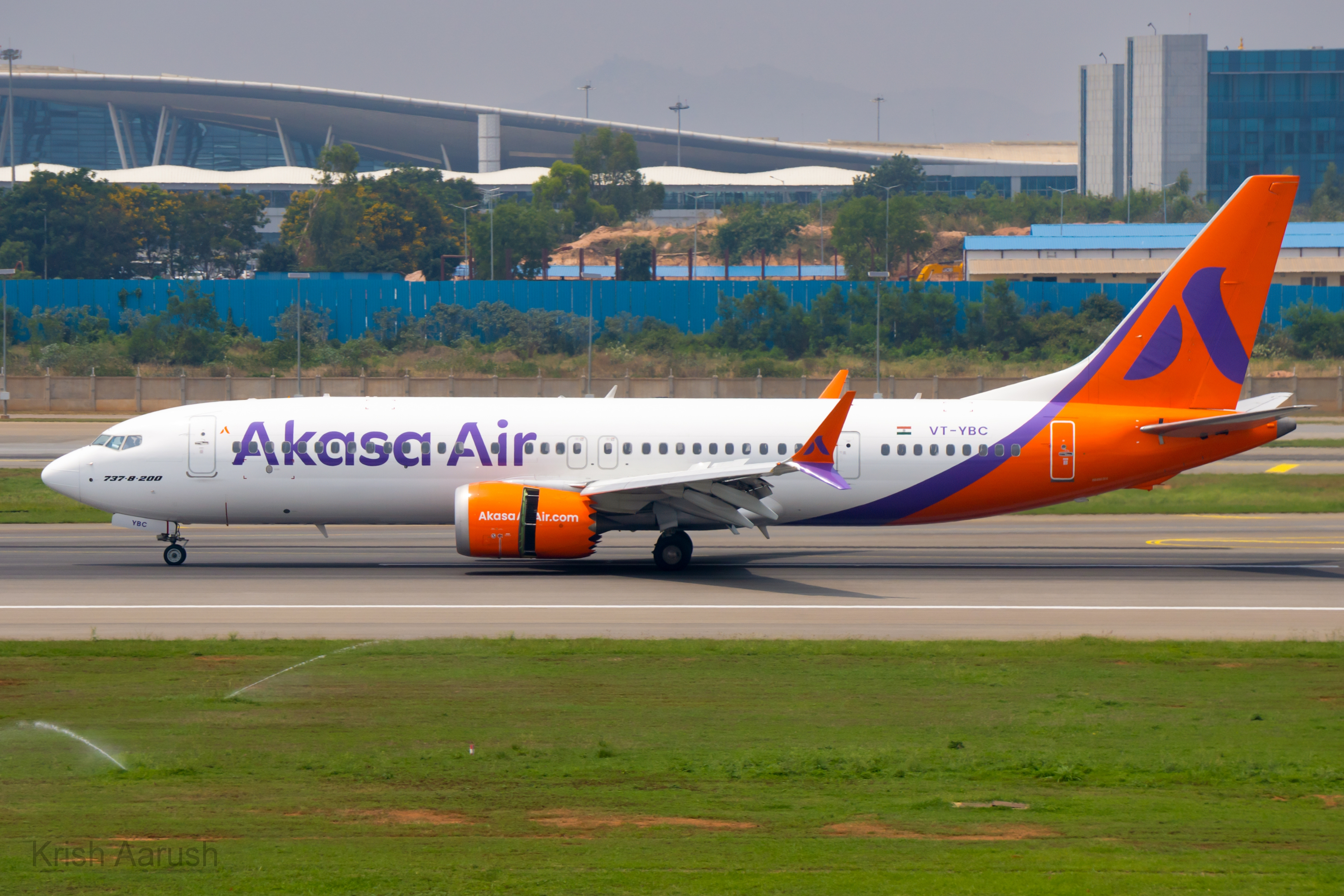
- Akasa Air Boeing 737 MAX 8
IATA	ICAO	Call sign
QP	AKJ	AKASA AIR
- Founded: 22 December 2021; 4 years ago
- Commenced operations: 7 August 2022; 4 years ago
- Operating bases: Bengaluru; Mumbai
- Fleet size: 45
- Destinations: 36
- Parent company: SNV Aviation
- Headquarters: Mumbai, Maharashtra, India
- Key people: Vinay Dube (MD & CEO)
- Revenue: ▲₹46.36 billion (US$500 million) (FY 2024–25)
- Profit: ▼₹−19.83 billion (US$−210 million) (FY 2024–25)
- Website: akasaair.com

Akasa Air is an Indian low-cost airline headquartered in Mumbai, Maharashtra. It was founded in 2021 by a team that included Vinay Dube and Aditya Ghosh, with investor Rakesh Jhunjhunwala holding a major stake in the airline. The airline began commercial operations on 7 August 2022. As of November 2026, the airline flies to 38 destinations including 7 international destinations with an all-Boeing 737 MAX fleet.

== History ==
In March 2021, a group of former executives from defunct airlines Jet Airways and Go First, announced plans to launch a new low-cost carrier. In July 2021, Rakesh Jhunjhunwala invested US$35 million for a 40% stake in the carrier. Vinay Dube owned 31% of the airline and Aditya Ghosh owned 10% of it. Later, Jhunjhunwala increased his stake in the airline to 46%. The airline received a No Objection Certificate from the Ministry of Civil Aviation in October 2021. In March 2022, the airline announced plans to start operations in June 2022, with flights connecting various tier-2 and tier-3 towns to the metros. On 7 July 2022, the airline received its air operator's certificate from the Directorate General of Civil Aviation (DGCA) after completing the required proving flights, and started accepting bookings from later that month.

On 7 August 2022, Akasa Air operated its first commercial flight between Mumbai and Ahmedabad, which carried the airline executives, journalists, and bloggers. The airline commenced operations with a fleet of two Boeing 737 MAX aircraft, with plans to add an aircraft every two weeks. On 25 August 2022, the airline reported a data breach to the Indian Computer Emergency Response Team. In August–September 2023, the airline cancelled over 700 flights as several pilots left the airline and joined Air India Express. While the airline sent a legal notice to the pilots and initiated legal proceedings against the DGCA for its inaction, Air India Express responded that the pilots had fulfilled their obligation by paying a set bond amount to Akasa Air.

Akasa Air announced plans to commence international flights starting in 2023. In December 2023, Akasa Air received permission from the DGCA to operate international flights. On 28 March 2024, it commenced its inaugural international flights between Mumbai and Doha, with expansion to other cities starting in the coming months. On 8 January 2025, the airline became a member of International Air Transport Association, following completion of pre-requisite safety audits earlier that week. In February 2026, a Delhi court ordered Akasa Air to pay ₹10.8 million (US$120,000) to a travel agency for the cancellation of 640 seats booked during December 2023–January 2024.

== Corporate affairs ==
Akasa Air is headquartered in Mumbai. Vinay Dube serves as the managing director and CEO of the airline. As of late 2023, the Jhunjhunwala estate owned 45.97% of the airline, with Dube holding a 16.13% stake, Madhav Bhatkuly with 9.41%, Sanjay Dube and Niraj Dube each with 7.59%, and PAR Capital Ventures with 6.37%.

=== Logo and livery ===
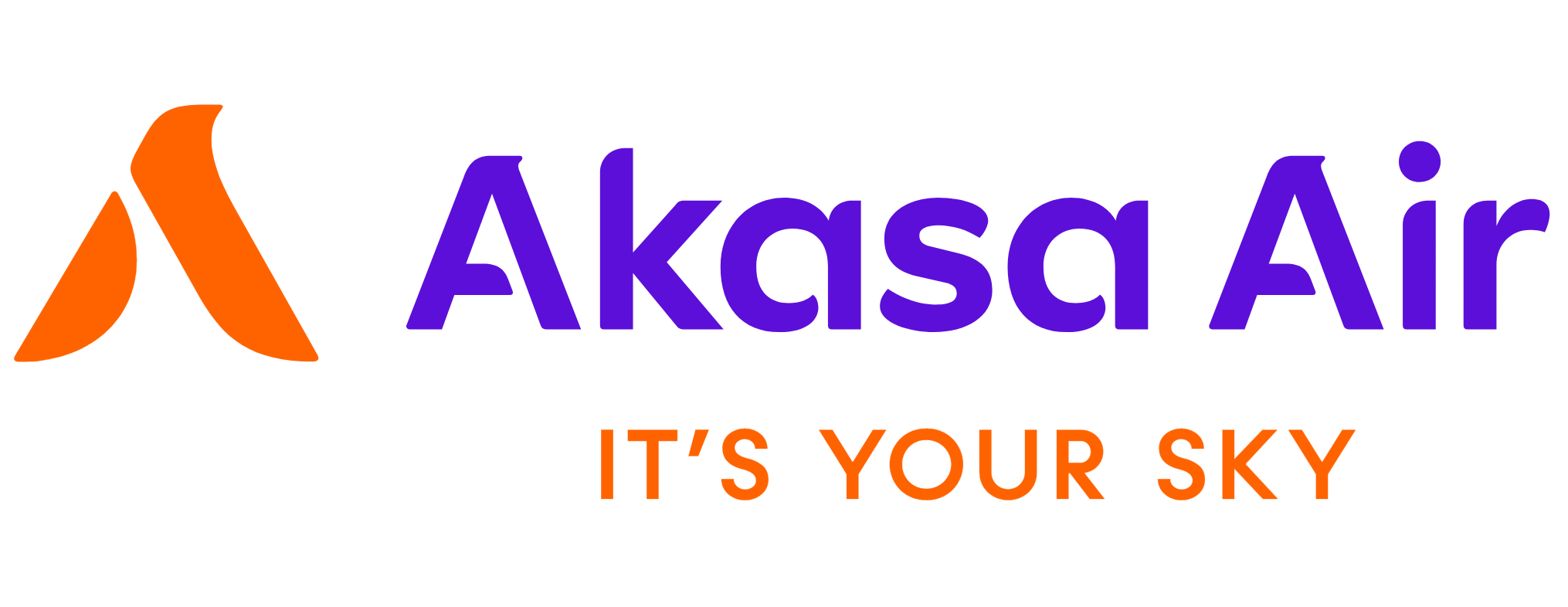
Akasa Air’s logo with tagline

On 22 December 2021, the airline unveiled its brand identity and logo, with the tagline It's Your Sky. The logo consists of a 'rising A' symbol in 'Sunrise orange', shaped like a flying bird, and the name of the airline in purple along side. The aircraft have a predominantly white colour scheme with the name of the airline in purple on both sides of the fuselage. An orange colour scheme starts in the rear underbody fuselage and continues till the end of the tail section, along with blue accents around the front edges and the 'rising A' in blue on the tail. The winglets and engines of the aircraft are painted in orange.

In July 2022, the airline unveiled its crew uniform. The ground crew uniform had grey top with a black pants, and orange sneakers. The cabin crew uniform had orange top and similar combination of pants and sneakers. It was the first airline in India to introduce sneakers made of recycled rubber, and to introduce them as a part of uniform for cabin crew.

== Destinations ==
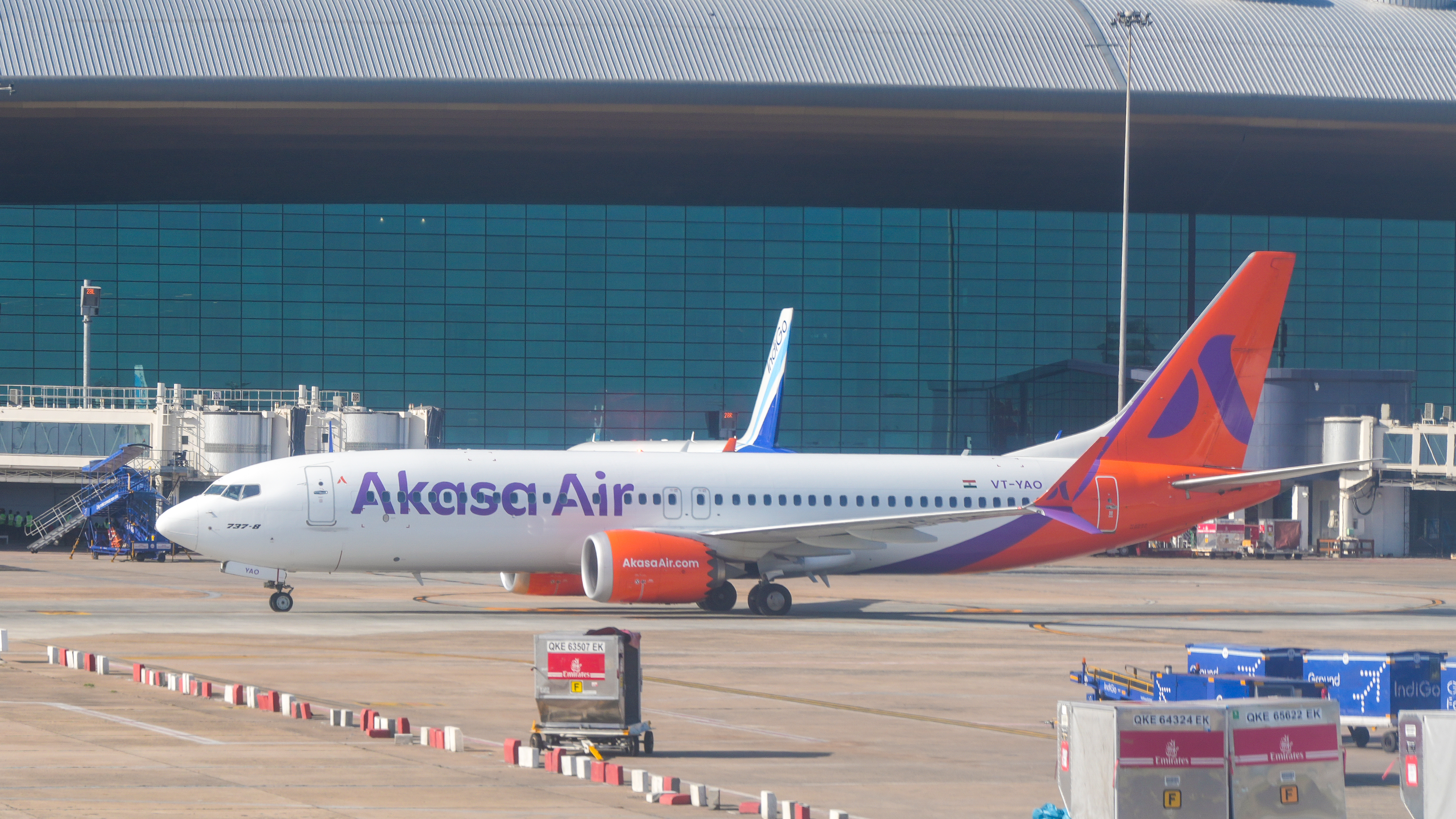
Akasa Air Boeing 737 MAX 8 (VT-YAO) at Chennai International Airport

Akasa Air launched its commercial operations in July 2022 with 28 weekly flights connecting four destinations. The airline launched international flights to Qatar in March 2024, and later added flights to Kuwait, Saudi Arabia, Thailand, and the United Arab Emirates.

As of January 2026, the airline flies to a total of 31 destinations including 25 domestic destinations and six international destinations. It maintains operating bases at Kempegowda International Airport in Bengaluru and Chhatrapati Shivaji Maharaj International Airport in Mumbai. The airline plans to establish hubs at Navi Mumbai International Airport and Noida International Airport.

Destinations
State	City	Airport	Notes	Refs
India (Andaman and Nicobar Islands)	Port Blair	Veer Savarkar International Airport		
India (Andhra Pradesh)	Visakhapatnam	Alluri Sitarama Raju International Airport		
India (Assam)	Guwahati	Lokpriya Gopinath Bordoloi International Airport		
India (Bihar)	Darbhanga	Darbhanga Airport		
India (Delhi)	New Delhi	Indira Gandhi International Airport		
India (Goa)	Mopa	Manohar International Airport		
India (Gujarat)	Ahmedabad	Sardar Vallabhbhai Patel International Airport		
India (Jammu and Kashmir)	Srinagar	Srinagar Airport		
India (Karnataka)	Bengaluru	Kempegowda International Airport	Base	
India (Kerala)	Kochi	Cochin International Airport		
India (Kerala)	Kozhikode	Calicut International Airport		
India (Madhya Pradesh)	Gwalior	Gwalior Airport		
India (Maharashtra)	Mumbai	Chhatrapati Shivaji Maharaj International Airport	Base	
India (Maharashtra)	Mumbai	Navi Mumbai International Airport		
India (Maharashtra)	Pune	Pune Airport		
India (Odisha)	Bhubaneswar	Biju Patnaik Airport		
India (Punjab)	Chandigarh	Chandigarh Airport		
India (Rajasthan)	Jaipur	Jaipur International Airport		
India (Rajasthan)	Udaipur	Maharana Pratap Airport		
India (Tamil Nadu)	Chennai	Chennai International Airport		
India (Telangana)	Hyderabad	Rajiv Gandhi International Airport		
India (Tripura)	Agartala	Maharaja Bir Bikram Airport		
India (Uttar Pradesh)	Ayodhya	Maharishi Valmiki International Airport		
India (Uttar Pradesh)	Gorakhpur	Mahayogi Gorakhnath Airport		
India (Uttar Pradesh)	Lucknow	Chaudhary Charan Singh International Airport		
India (Uttar Pradesh)	Noida	Noida International Airport		
India (Uttar Pradesh)	Prayagraj	Prayagraj Airport		
India (Uttar Pradesh)	Varanasi	Lal Bahadur Shastri Airport		
India (West Bengal)	Bagdogra	Bagdogra Airport		
India (West Bengal)	Kolkata	Netaji Subhas Chandra Bose International Airport		
Kuwait	Kuwait City	Kuwait International Airport		
Qatar	Doha	Hamad International Airport		
Saudi Arabia	Jeddah	King Abdulaziz International Airport		
Saudi Arabia	Riyadh	King Khalid International Airport		
Thailand	Phuket	Phuket International Airport		
United Arab Emirates	Abu Dhabi	Zayed International Airport		
Vietnam	Hanoi	Noi Bai International Airport		

=== Codeshare agreements ===
Akasa Air announced a codeshare agreement with Etihad Airways in early December 2024.

== Fleet ==
Akasa Air operates an all-Boeing 737 MAX fleet. As of January 2026, the fleet is composed of the following aircraft:

Akasa Air fleet
Aircraft	In service	Orders	Passengers	Notes
Boeing 737 MAX 8	19	—	189	
Boeing 737 MAX 8	2	—	186	
Boeing 737 MAX 8	2	—	185	
Boeing 737 MAX 10	—	99	TBA	Deliveries through 2032
Boeing 737 MAX 200	22	82	197	Deliveries through 2032
Total	45	181		

=== Fleet development ===
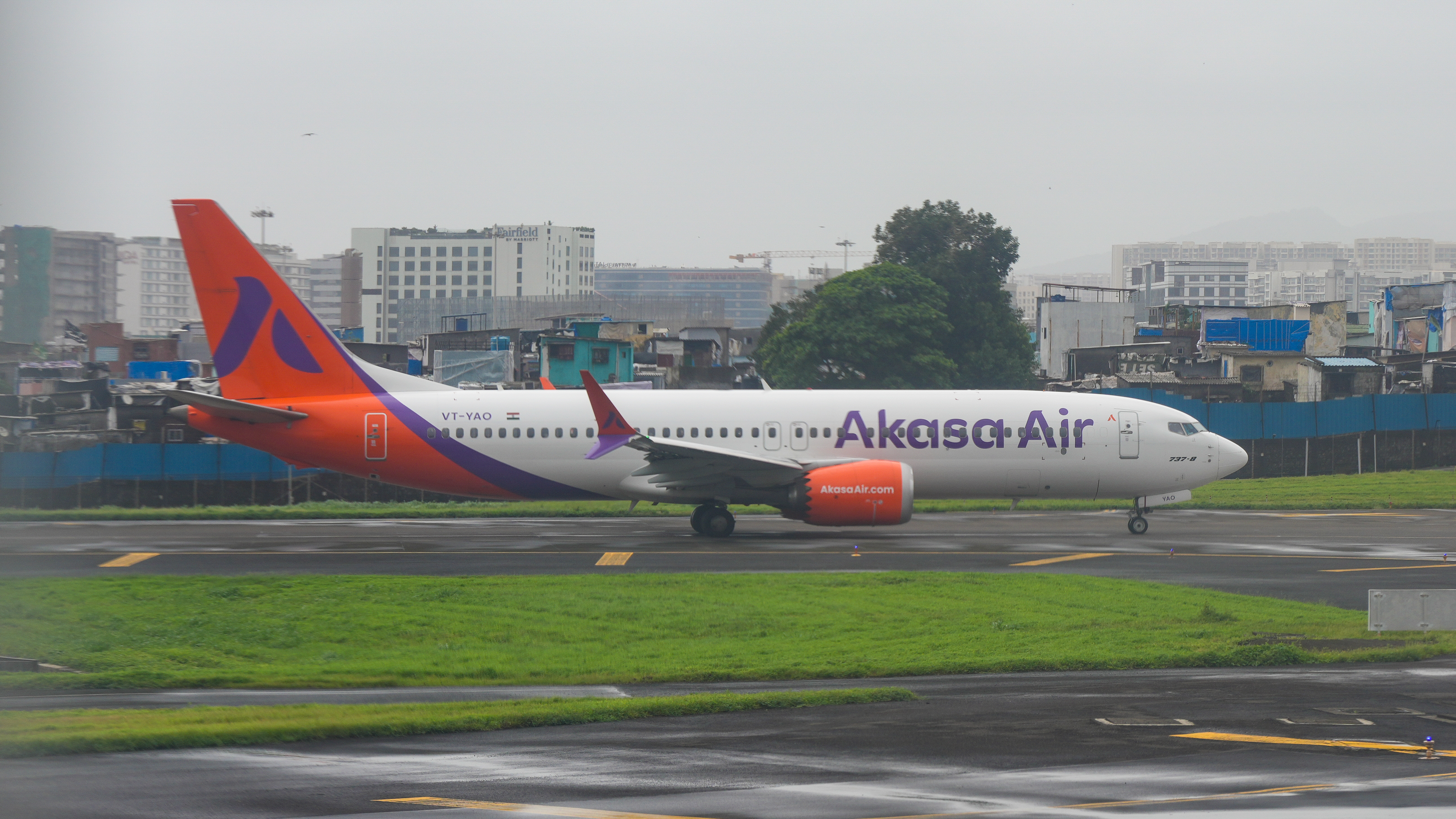
Akasa Air Boeing 737 MAX 8

On 16 November 2021, Akasa Air placed an initial order for 72 Boeing 737 MAX aircraft valued at nearly $9 billion in list prices at the 2021 Dubai Airshow. The order included 19 Boeing 737 MAX 8 and 53 higher-capacity Boeing 737 MAX 200 aircraft. It took the delivery of its first Boeing 737 MAX 8 aircraft on 16 June 2022. The airline partnered with Griffin Global Asset Management for a sale-leaseback agreement which included five of the Boeing 737 MAX aircraft. During the 2023 Paris Air Show, the airline placed an additional order for four Boeing 737 MAX 8 aircraft. The airline planned to place additional order for aircraft by the end of 2023 to cater to its future growth plans. On 18 January 2024, the airline placed an additional order for 150 Boeing 737 MAX aircraft at Wings India 2024. The order consisted of 99 Boeing 737 MAX 10 and an additional 51 Boeing 737 MAX 200 aircraft. On 26 January 2024, the airline announced an order for CFM LEAP-1B engines to power its upcoming Boeing 737 MAX aircraft.

== Services ==
Interior of Akasa Air Boeing 737 MAX

Being a low-cost airline, Akasa Air operates an all economy configuration in their Boeing 737 MAX variants. The airline does not provide in-flight meals as a part of the ticket, and the passengers can purchase from the limited menu on board. The airline offers premium services for an additional fee where passengers can get food, seat selection, priority boarding and free date changes and cancellations. This service is similar to other low-cost carriers in India. The airline has partnered with Blue Ribbon Bags for providing luggage protection services.

== See also ==
- Aviation in India
- List of airlines of India
- Transport in India
