= National Archives of Nigeria =

Archives

The National Archives of Nigeria has its headquarters in Abuja, Nigeria, with branches in Enugu, Ibadan, and Kaduna.The National Archives Kaduna is located at 6 Yakubu Gowon Way, Kaduna. As of 2024, the current Director of Archives is Mrs Evelyn Odigbo.

== History of Ibadan archive ==
Professor Kenneth Onwuka Dike did a survey of Nigerian public records from 1951 to 1953. Based on what was found, he made a recommendation to have a public record office. This led to the founding of the Nigerian Record Office on April 1, 1954. In 1957, the Public Archives Ordinance No. 43 was enacted and became effective on November 14, 1957. It changed the name of the archives to become the National Archives of Nigeria.

The archive was housed at the University of Ibadan until 1958.

The Federal Government provided £51,000 to create the first permanent building in Ibadan in the First Economic Programme, 1955–60. This building officially opened on January 9, 1959.

== Past Leadership ==
- Kenneth Dike was originally appointed the Government Supervisor of Public Records and then the Director of the Archives from 1954 to 1963. He is also considered to be the father of the Nigerian Archives.
- Lloyd C. Gwam followed soon afterwards on April 1, 1964, to become the Director of the Archives until his death on July 2, 1965.
- S.O. Sowoolu succeeded Mr. Gwam and is credited for starting the expansion of the archives.

== Locations ==
The National Archives of Nigeria has fifteen offices. The three main archive locations are zonal offices. Each location keeps records of colonial administration relating to its particular region, along with newspapers and official government publications.

=== Zonal offices ===
- Enugu (east, est. 1958)
- Ibadan (west, est. 1958)
- Kaduna (north, est. 1957)

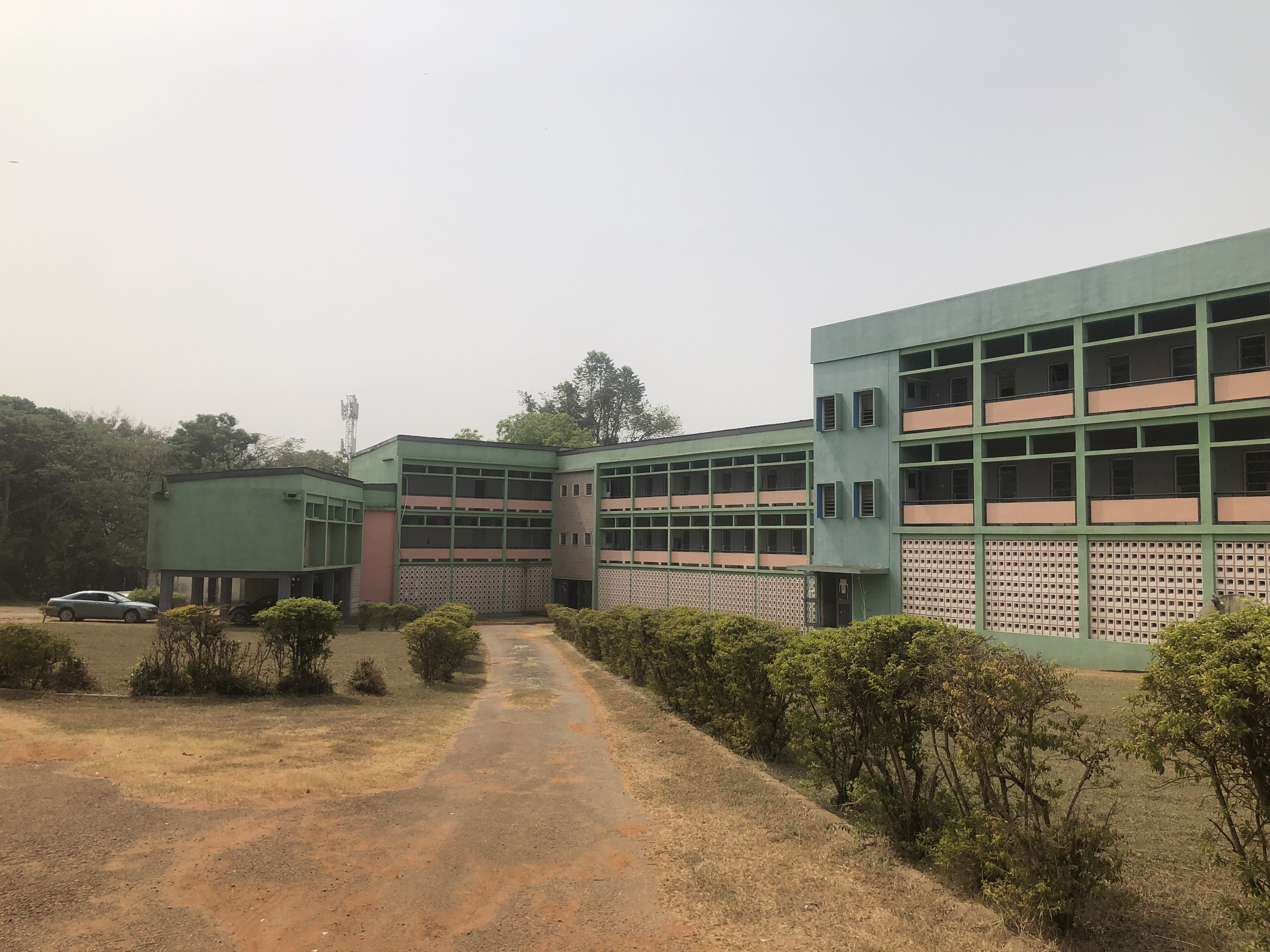
Main building of the National archives Ibadan.

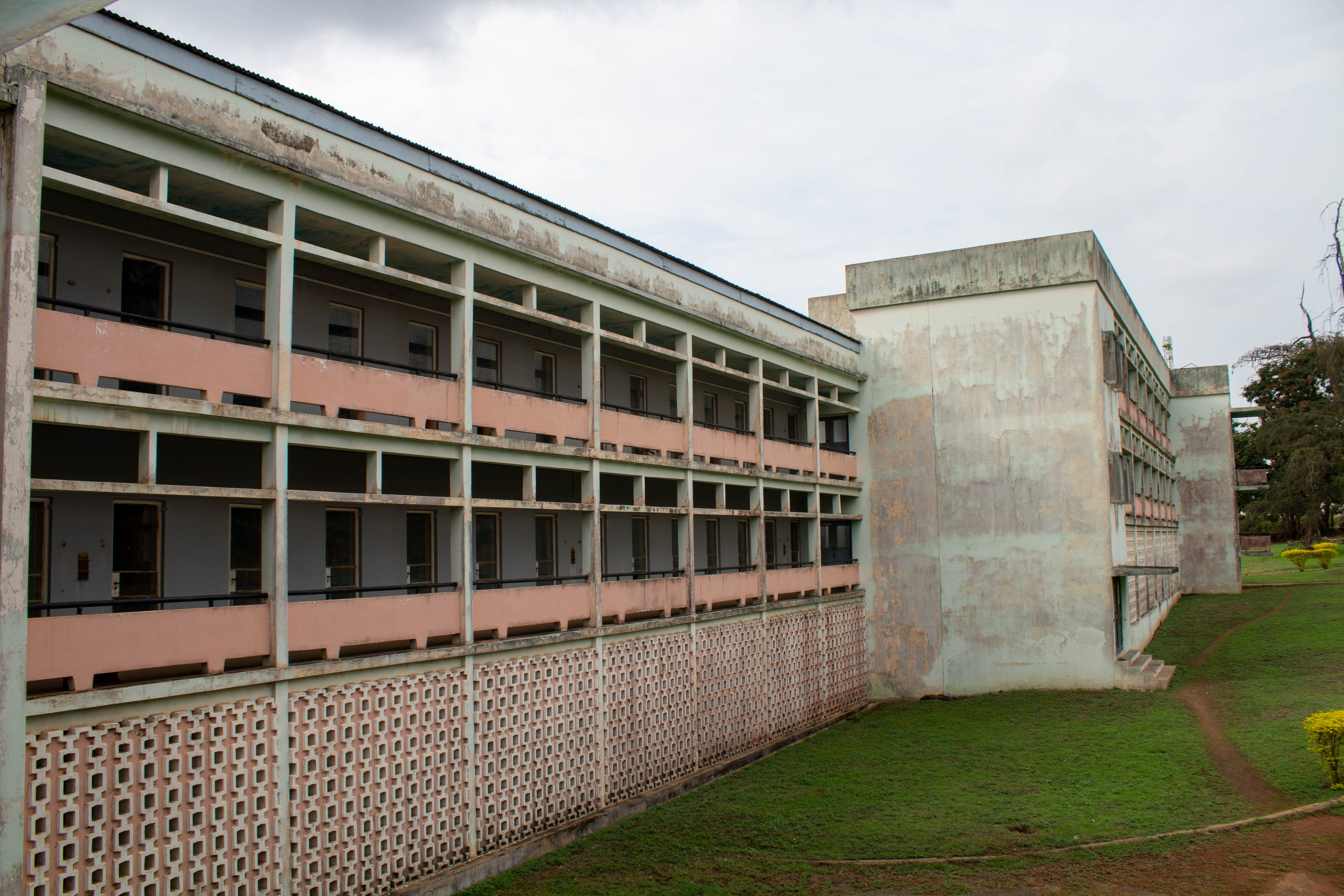
National Archives of Nigeria, Ibadan

=== Branch offices ===
- Abeokuta (est. 1989)
- Abuja (headquarters)
- Akure (est. 1985)
- Benin (est. 1982)
- Calabar (est. 1986)
- Ilorin (est. 1985)
- Jos (est. 1989)
- Lagos
- Maiduguri (est. 2005)
- Owerri (est. 1986)
- Port Harcourt (est. 1986)
- Sokoto (est. 1982)

== Professional memberships ==
=== National ===
- Historical Society of Nigeria
- Oral History/Tradition Association of Nigeria
- Society of Nigerian Archivists

=== Regional ===
- Society of African Archivists
- West African Regional Branch of the International Council on Archives (WARBICA)

=== International ===
- Association of Commonwealth Archivists and Record Managers
- International Council on Archives (ICA)
- International Records Management Council

== See also ==
- National Library of Nigeria
- List of national archives

== Bibliography ==
published in 20th century

- S.S. Waniko (1959). "Nigeria's history on record". West-African Review. 30. London. OCLC 2451556. (About National Archives)
- Lloyd Gwam (1963). "The First Permanent Building of the Nigerian National Archives". American Archivist. 26: 67–74. doi:10.17723/aarc.26.1.l5412hr043222776.
- National Archives of Nigeria (1985). National Archives of Nigeria: Its purpose, development and functions.
- Gizachew Adamu (1989). "Archives in Nigeria: how to salvage the soul of the nation". Savanna: A Journal of the Environmental and Social Sciences. 10. Nigeria: Ahmadu Bello University. ISSN 0331-0523. (About National Archives)
- J. van Albada; P. Bower (1989), Records management and national archives in Nigeria (PDF), Technical Report, Paris: Unesco
- C. Uduigwome (1989). "Use of archival resources by students in the National Archives, Ibadan". Nigerian Archives. 1. Society of Nigerian Archivists. ISSN 1115-2141.
- Simon Heap (1991). "Nigerian National Archives, Ibadan: An Introduction for Users and a Summary of Holdings". History in Africa. 18: 159–172. doi:10.2307/3172061. JSTOR 3172061. S2CID 248817669.
- Jörg Adelberger (1992). "National Archives: Kaduna (NAK), Nigeria". History in Africa. 19: 435–439. doi:10.2307/3172011. JSTOR 3172011. S2CID 162380404.
- National Archives Act, Nigeria, 1992
- Simon Heap (1993). "Nigerian National Archives, Kaduna: An Introduction for Users and a Summary of Holdings". History in Africa. 20: 395–407. doi:10.2307/3171986. JSTOR 3171986. S2CID 248820516.
- Simon Heap (1994). "Nigerian National Archives, Enugu: An Introduction for Users and a Summary of Holdings". History in Africa. 21: 435–440. doi:10.2307/3171900. JSTOR 3171900. S2CID 161149360.
- National Archives of Nigeria (1995), Guide to Sources of Nigerian History, Lagos, ISBN 978-9783343801

published in 21st century

- Abiola Abioye (2007). "Fifty years of archives administration in Nigeria: lessons for the future". Records Management Journal. 17(1). doi:10.1108/09565690710730697.
- Angel D. Batiste (2007), State of Arabic Manuscript Collections in Nigeria: Report of a Survey Tour to Northern Nigeria, Washington DC: U.S. Library of Congress (Includes information about National Archives)
- Abiola Abioye (2009). "Searchers' Perception of Access Regulations in Nigerian National Archives". Library Philosophy and Practice. University of Nebraska-Lincoln. ISSN 1522-0222.
- Toyin Falola; Saheed Aderinto (2010). "K.O. Dike and the National Archives of Nigeria". Nigeria, Nationalism, and Writing History. United States: University of Rochester Press. pp. 27–36. ISBN 978-1-58046-358-4.
- A. A. Maidabino (2010). "Availability, Organization, and Use of Archival Records: A Study of Public Archives Agencies in the Northwestern States of Nigeria". Library Philosophy and Practice. University of Nebraska-Lincoln. ISSN 1522-0222.
- Olutayo Charles Adesina (2012), Archival Documents and the Gatekeepers in the Twenty-first Century: Reconfiguring Nigeria's National Archives. Abstract. Paper presented at conference in Senegal "Archives of Post-Independence Africa and its Diaspora"
- Mohammed Salau (2016). "National Archives Kaduna Collection". Endangered Archives. London: British Library.
- C.O. Onyeneke (2017). "Impact of disaster on access to records of National Archives of South East, Nigeria". Collection Building. 36 (2): 63–68. doi:10.1108/CB-12-2016-0033. ISSN 0160-4953.
