= Stone Maidens =

2012 novel by Lloyd Devereux Richards

- Author: Lloyd Devereux Richards
- Publisher: Thomas & Mercer
- Publication date: November 6, 2012

Stone Maidens is a 2013 thriller novel by Lloyd Devereux Richards. In February 2023, it reached #1 on the Amazon best seller list 10 years after its release - after Richards' daughter made a viral TikTok video promoting the book.

The novel features a forensic anthropologist at the FBI trying to solve the murders of several women in southern Indiana and discover the suspected serial killer behind their deaths.

== Development ==
Richards began writing the novel in 1998. He was inspired by unsolved crimes he had heard about while attending law school at Indiana University. The final draft of the book was finished in 2009, but Richards was turned down by 80 literary agents before he was published by Thomas & Mercer in 2012.

== Viral video ==
Richards' daughter, Marguerite, posted a TikTok promoting the book in early February 2023. The video gained 700,000 views overnight and had 42 million views a week later. By February 14 the novel had risen to the #1 spot on the Amazon best seller list.

== Adaptations ==
In February 2023 Richards shared that he had been working on a sequel to Stone Maidens for four and a half years, and hoped to publish it at some point.

That same month, USA Today reported that his agent was in negotiations for a potential film adaptation.
