= Lloyd Kenyon Jones =

American journalist, lecturer and author

Lloyd Kenyon Jones was an American journalist, lecturer, and author who was raised in Wisconsin and became associated with the religion of Spiritualism during the early 20th century.

Jones began his working life as an assistant in a print shop or "printer's devil" in a small town in Wisconsin. He soon moved into journalism, first in Wisconsin, then in Chicago, Illinois. He studied mysticism and occultism, and while a young man he became a practitioner of hypnotism and mentalism, touring the countryside for a while giving demonstrations of these arts. He later became interested in yoga and Buddhism and studied these traditions as well as Spiritualism.

His writings covered a variety of subjects, including sports journalism, divination from dreams, Spiritualism, the development of mediumship, faith healing, self-help, and mystical Christianity. During the 1910s, he worked with Mrs. Cecil M. Cook, Pastor and Medium of the William T. Stead Memorial Center in Chicago, Illinois, acting as a shorthand scribe during her seances, and editing the results of her spirit contacts into book form. He was also the founder and editor of the magazine Communication.

Several of Jones' books remain in print in the 21st century. In particular, The Eighteen Absent Years of Jesus Christ, which he had completed at the time of his death, and which was published posthumously, has continued to find an audience with mainstream Christians as well as Spiritualists.

== Bibliography ==
- Adultery the Parent of Sorrow
- Children and the Bible. Reprint ISBN 1-4304-0082-X
- Ciphers of the Apocalypse: The Great Prophetic Scriptural Cryptogram That is Woven into the Revelation, Regan Publishing Corp., Chicago.
- Communication with the Dead. Reprint ISBN 978-1-4253-2125-3
- Development of Mediumship
- The Eighteen Absent Years of Jesus Christ. Reprint ISBN 1-85228-656-3
- God's World: A Treatise on Spiritualism Founded on Transcripts of Shorthand Notes Taken Down, Over a Period of Five Years, in the Seance-Room of the William T. Stead Memorial Center (a Religious Body Incorporated Under the Statutes of the State of Illinois), Mrs. Cecil M. Cook, Medium and Pastor. Compiled and Written by Lloyd Kenyon Jones. Chicago, Ill.: The William T. Stead Memorial Center, 1919.
- Healing Forces, 1919; reprinted by Lormar Press, Chicago, 1948.
- How to Turn Failure Into Success
- Hunches: Dreams and their Meanings; Telepathy and Psychic Analysis, Lormar Press, Chicago, 1938.
- The Law of Compensation
- Marriage and Its Benefits (Pamphlet)
- Master Key of the Scriptures, 1926.
- Memory Keys
- The Natural Law of Success
- Of Little Human hearts. Reprint ISBN 1-58736-008-X
- Reincarnation. Reprint ISBN 978-1-4253-2131-4
- Strength of Mind and Body the Foundation of Success
- Spirit Healing
- Unmasking Fear
- What Dreams mean, 1920. Reprinted by Lormar Press, Chicago, 1949.
- The World Next Door
