= Lloyd Spencer Davis =

New Zealand-based author, filmmaker, scientist and science communicator

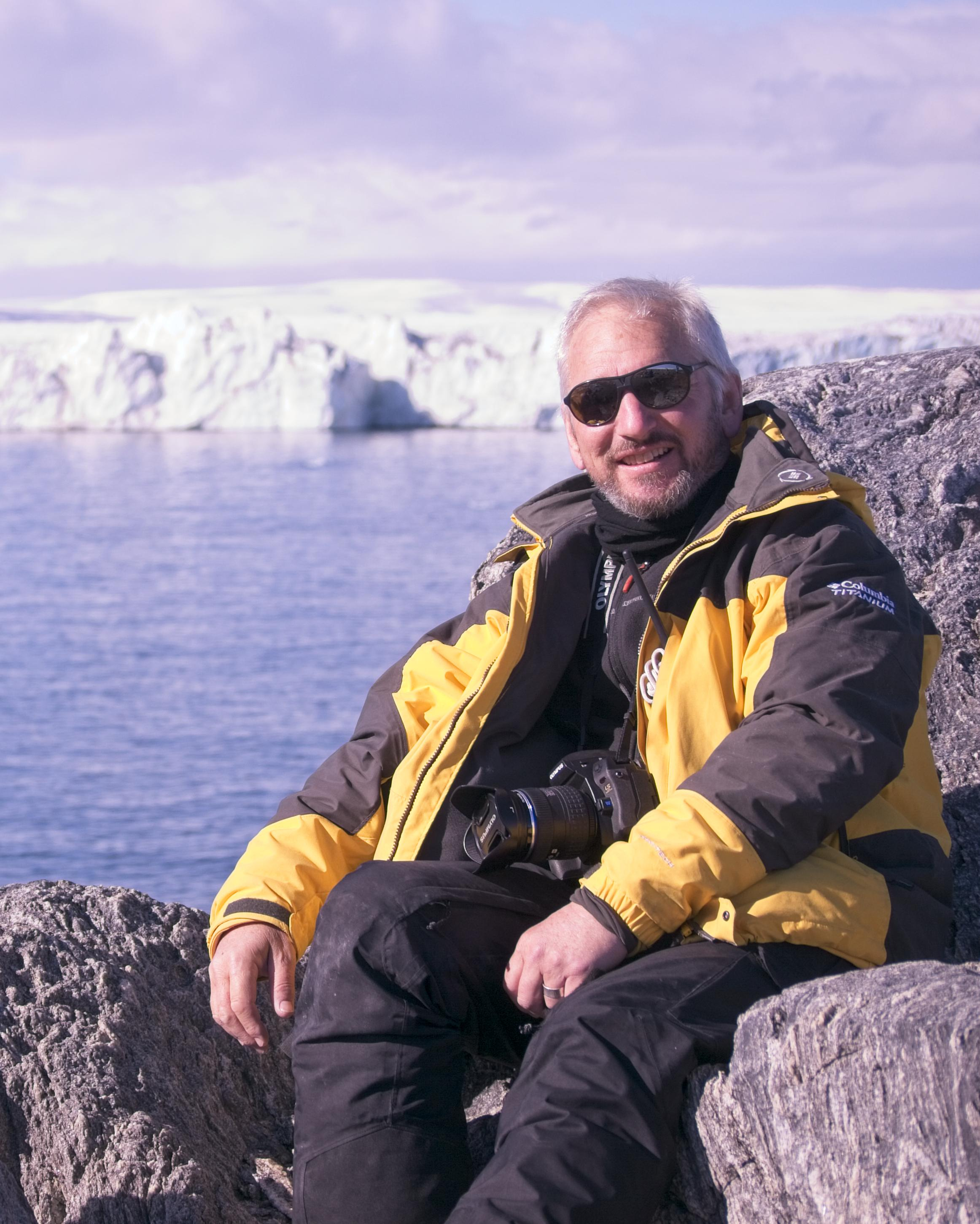
Lloyd Spencer Davis in Terra Nova Bay, Antarctica

Lloyd Spencer Davis is a New Zealand-based author, filmmaker, scientist and science communicator. Born in Napier in 1954, he is known particularly for his creative nonfiction writing about science and nature subjects. He has published ten books and been co-editor of another two, as well as authoring over 150 scientific papers.

== Writer ==
Davis's first book Penguin: a season in the life of the Adélie penguin (published by Pavilion Books, London, 1993, and Harcourt Brace, San Diego, 1994) provides a penguin's-eye view of life in Antarctica. It received the 1994 PEN (NZ) Best First Book Award for Nonfiction. The Plight of the Penguin (published by Longacre Press, Dunedin, 2001) won the New Zealand Post New Zealand Children's Book of the Year Award in 2002, the first time a nonfiction book had won the award, as well as winning the New Zealand Post New Zealand Children's Best Nonfiction Book Award. His book, Looking for Darwin (published by Longacre Press, Dunedin, 2007) is part travelogue, part personal memoir, and part essay about Charles Darwin. It earned him the Copyright Licensing (CLL) Writer's Award for Nonfiction, New Zealand's premier award for the support of nonfiction, as well as the Runner's Up Award as the New Zealand Travel Book of the Year in 2008. A Polar Affair: Antarctica’s Forgotten Hero and the Secret Love Lives of Penguins (published by Pegasus Books, New York, 2019) investigates the life of polar explorer Dr Murray Levick and the sexual behavior of penguins. It was named by Science News as one of their Favorite Science Books for 2019.

== Filmmaker ==
Davis has been a documentary filmmaker for since the early 1980s. The first film directed by him, Eating Like A Gannet, was made in association with the Television New Zealand Natural History Unit and Ecology Division, DSIR (1986). Screened in over 100 countries, it documented the change in the world's only mainland colony of gannets at Cape Kidnappers, New Zealand. Meet the Real Penguins, was directed by him as a co-production between NHNZ and WNET. In the USA it was entitled The World of Penguins, where it screened on PBS in 1997. It won twelve international awards, including the Abu Prize for Best Documentary at the Asia-Pacific Broadcasting Union, Hong Kong, and the Special Prize of the Jury at the 1st International Science Film Festival, Budapest, Hungary. More recently, his documentary, The Guardian of Kinabalu, co-produced and co-directed with Wiebke Finkler, won the Special Jury Prize at the 11th Kuala Lumpur Environmental Film Festival in 2018. In 2001, he established the world's first university-based course in Natural History Filmmaking at the University of Otago in association with NHNZ.

== Scientist ==
Davis has a PhD in zoology from the University of Alberta, Canada. His research has primarily concentrated on understanding the behavior of animals from an evolutionary perspective, especially the behavioral ecology of penguins and seals. More recently, the focus of his research has shifted to aspects of the communication of science and the newly emerging field of science diplomacy. His awards include a Fulbright Award, a Prince and Princess of Wales Scientific Award, and an Anzac Fellowship. He co-founded the International Conference on Penguins, which is held every three years, organizing the first one in Dunedin, New Zealand, in 1988.

== Science communicator ==
In 2007, Davis was appointed as the inaugural Stuart Professor of Science Communication at the University of Otago in Dunedin. A year later, he established New Zealand's first university centre devoted to the teaching and research of science communication, being the Director of the University of Otago's Centre for Science Communication from February 2008 to October 2017. He is a Life Member of the Public Communication of Science and Technology (PCST) Network and was its vice president for five years.
