= Lloyd McIntyre =

Canadian ice hockey player

- Born: May 13, 1908; Chatham, New Brunswick, Canada
- Died: November 29, 1984 (aged 76)
- Height: 5 ft 10 in (178 cm)
- Weight: 154 lb (70 kg; 11 st 0 lb)
- Position: Left wing
- Shot: Right
- Played for: Edmonton Eskimos
- Playing career: 1925–1940

Lloyd Alexander McIntyre (May 13, 1908 - November 29, 1984) was a Canadian professional ice hockey player. He played with the Edmonton Eskimos of the Western Canada Hockey League. McIntyre also played with the Hamilton Tigers and Pittsburgh Yellow Jackets of the International Hockey League, and Quebec Castors of the CAHL.

He was the last surviving former player of the Edmonton Eskimos.
