= Lloyd E. Varden =

American photography expert (1911–1970)

Lloyd E. Varden (November 6, 1911 – January 15, 1970) was an American expert in the photographic field and related sciences. He was an adjunct Professor of Photographic Sciences and Engineering at Columbia University in New York 1951–1968.

== Personal ==
Varden was born on November 6, 1911, in Evansville, Indiana. He grew up there attending Bosse High School. He studied chemistry at Maryville College and the University of Kentucky but was forced to drop out and enter the workforce due to the lack of family finances in the Great Depression. He married Madeline Rose Maulding of Evansville, Indiana, in 1935. Divorced, he then married Maude Belling in 1953. Varden died in 1970 in New York City.

== Career in industry ==
Varden first joined Huffman Labs in Evansville as a chemist. Following his interest in chemistry and photography, he joined Agfa Ansco as a technical representative in 1934 in Cincinnati. In 1936 he was brought to Ansco Division of General Aniline and Film Corporation in Binghamton, New York, where he rose to Director of Education. Taking a hiatus during the Second World War, he served on the War Production Board in Washington, D.C. After the war, he returned to Ansco for a short period. In 1945 he joined Pavelle Color Labs in New York City and was there until 1955 as Vice President and Technical Director.

== International consultant ==
In 1955 Varden went on his own as a consultant in the industry and became an adjunct Professor at Columbia University School of Engineering. His U.S. clients included 3M, Polaroid, Xerox and Brookhaven National Labs. His international clients included Ferrania (Italy), Ciba (Switzerland), Perutz (Germany), Agfa (Germany), Gevaert (Belgium), Ilford (UK) and Fuji Photo Film (Japan).

== The Varden Library ==
At the time of his death, Varden had amassed the second-largest photographic sciences library in the world. It was the largest private library of its type, with Eastman Kodak's being the biggest. He educated himself with the books, collecting and adding other libraries over the years. After his death, his library was sold to Fuji Photo Film and continues to be maintained.

== Publication ==
Varden wrote numerous parts of major books on Photographic Sciences. During the 1960s, he wrote a monthly article called "What's Ahead" in Modern Photography magazine.

== Honors ==
Varden received an honorary Degree from Maryville College in 1964. He won the Breme Memorial Medal in 1952 from Rochester Institute of Technology; the Louis Schmid Award 1957 from The Biological Photographers Association, and the Photographic Society of America Progress Medal 1964. He was a Fellow of the Society of Photographic Scientists and Engineers and a Fellow of the Royal Photographic Society of Great Britain.
