= Lloyd MacInnis =

Canadian television presenter (1917–1965)

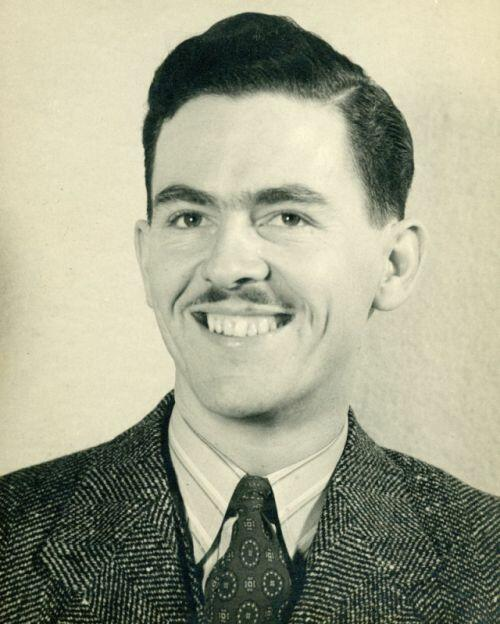
- Born: Lloyd Young MacInnis; 21 August 1917; Sydney, Nova Scotia, Canada
- Died: 14 March 1965 (aged 47); Washington, D.C., United States
- Occupations: Television presenter; radio host; documentary filmmaker
- Known for: The Silence Barrier (1964)
- Awards: Alexander Graham Bell Award (1965)

Lloyd Young MacInnis (21 August 1917 – 14 March 1965) was a Canadian radio host and television presenter from Nova Scotia. He was the writer and narrator of the 1964 two-part documentary The Silence Barrier, which covered deafness and teaching deaf children to speak. The documentary was produced by CBC Halifax and won the 1965 Alexander Graham Bell Award.

== Biography ==
MacInnis was born in Sydney, Nova Scotia on 21 August 1917 to parents Frederick MacInnis and Martha Young. He had three siblings: Jean, Roy, and Helen. MacInnis graduated from Sydney Academy and went on to marry Florence Martin, with whom he had three children.

After completing his education at Sydney Academy, MacInnis became employed at the Royal Bank of Canada before later moving to Moncton where he got a job at a dry cleaning business and began to take an interest in broadcasting. He started working at the radio station CJCB in Sydney in 1948, where he co-hosted the shows The Morning Clock and Dishpan Parade with Bill Loeb. The shows were popular in Cape Breton and garnered a community of fans. The Morning Clock ceased production in 1952.

In 1958, MacInnis began working in television, hosting Gazette with the Canadian Broadcasting Corporation where he became known for his coverage of the Springhill mining disasters. The same year, MacInnis launched a lawsuit against the Crown after a publicity flight in a Royal Canadian Air Force jet. He claimed that during the course of the flight he was subjected to high levels of pressure, and blacked out following two rolls and a dive, developing an ulcer as a result of the incident. MacInnis sought $18,000 in damages. The lawsuit was later settled out of court, and the monetary amount of the settlement was not disclosed.

MacInnis was the writer and host of the CBC Television program The Silence Barrier, a two-part documentary concerning deafness and teaching deaf children to speak. The documentary was produced by Sandy Lumsden at CBC Halifax, and premiered in October 1964. The documentary won the 1965 Alexander Graham Bell Award in recognition of its contributions towards increasing public understanding of deafness.

MacInnis travelled to Washington, D.C. in March 1965 to accept one of two awards conferred by the Alexander Graham Bell Association for the Deaf for his work on The Silence Barrier. On 14 March 1965, MacInnis died of a sudden heart attack at the age of 47, after hosting a benefit variety show for the Kiwanis Club. He was remembered by fellow radio broadcaster Edmund Morris on CNHS Radio as "a gentleman, a thoroughbred, that happy breed of broadcaster whose public image was a precise and easy replica of his private character."

MacInnis' death invoked a strong public reaction, and hundreds of people attended his funeral at Bethany United Church in Halifax. He is buried at the Fairview Lawn Cemetery.

An award was created in memorial of MacInnis known as the Lloyd MacInnis Award. Nina Cohen received the award in 1968.

== See also ==
- Don Messer's Jubilee
