= Lloyd Lislevand =

Norwegian footballer (born 1969)

Personal information
- Date of birth: 28 October 1969 (age 57)
- Place of birth: Vigeland, Norway
- Position: Midfielder

Youth career
- Giv Akt

Senior career*
Years	Team	Apps	(Gls)
1988–1989	Vidar		
1989	Randaberg		
1989–1991	OFI	5	(0)
1991–1992	Start		
1992	Fana		
1993–1995	Charavgiakos		
1995–1996	Anagennisi Karditsa		
1996	APEP Pitsilia		
1997	Anagennisi Dherynia		
1998	Aris Limassol		
1999	Niki Volos		
1999–2000	Poseidon Michaniona		
2000–2001	Olympiakos Chersonissos		
2001–2002	Kassandra		
2002–2003	Olympiakos Chersonissos		
2003–2004	Patouhas Viannou		
- * Club domestic league appearances and goals

Lloyd Lislevand (born 28 October 1969) is a retired footballer who played as a midfielder for clubs in Norway, Greece and Cyprus.

== Club career ==
Born in Vigeland, Lislevand began playing football with FK Vidar in the Norwegian second division. He would play for several other Norwegian clubs, including IK Start in the premier league and Randaberg IL and Fana IL in the first division.

Lislevand moved to Greece in July 1989, where he would play for Greek first division side OFI. He made only five appearances in the Greek top flight, but would play in the Greek second division with Charavgiakos, Anagennisi Karditsa and Niki Volos, and in the Greek third division with Poseidon Michaniona, Olympiakos Chersonissos and Kassandra

He also had a spell in Cyprus with APEP F.C., Anagennisi Dherynia F.C. and Aris Limassol F.C.
