= Lloyd Wood (director) =

British theatre and opera director

- Born: London, England
- Education: University of Cambridge
- Occupation: Theatre Director

Lloyd Wood is a British theatre and opera director who has worked in the UK and internationally.

Wood has since left directing and trained as a Chartered clinical psychologist.

== Directing career ==
After studying at Cambridge University and at University College London, Wood worked as an assistant director at the Royal Court Theatre and the Gate Theatre. He later became Associate Director at the Theatre Royal Haymarket and the Gate Theatre.

His productions included Don Giovanni with English Touring Opera and IMPOSSIBLE, an international magic show seen, originally, in London's Noel Coward Theatre in 2015.

He was nominated for Best Newcomer in the International Opera Awards 2017.
