= Lloyd E. Davis =

American politician and farmer

Lloyd Elmo Davis (June 27, 1899–November 14, 1955) was an American politician and farmer.

Davis was born in Springfield, Illinois. He went to the Christian County Public Schools and to the Taylorville High School in Taylorville, Illinois. Davis also went to the Chicago and Boston Schools of Commerce. He was a farmer and raised cattle. Davis was also involved with farm management. He lived with his wife and family in Morrisonville, Illinois. Davis served on the Christian County Board of Supervisors and was involved with the Republican Party. He served in the Illinois Senate from 193 until his death in 1955. Davis died at Springfield Memorial Hospital in Springfield, Illinois, from inflammation of his stomach.
