= Lloyd =

Lloyd, Lloyd's, or Lloyds may refer to:

== People ==
- Lloyd (name), a variation of the Welsh word llwyd ("grey") or clwyd
  - List of people with given name Lloyd
  - List of people with surname Lloyd
- Lloyd (singer) (born 1986), American singer

== Places ==
=== United States ===
- Lloyd, Florida
- Lloyd, Kentucky
- Lloyd, Montana
- Lloyd, New York
- Lloyd, Ohio
- Lloyds, Maryland
- Lloyds, Virginia

=== Elsewhere ===
- Lloydminster, or "Lloyd", straddling the provincial border between Alberta and Saskatchewan, Canada

== Companies and businesses ==
=== Derived from Lloyd's Coffee House ===
- Lloyd's Coffee House, a London meeting place for merchants and shipowners between about 1688 and 1774
- Lloyd's of London, a British insurance market
  - Lloyd's of London (film), a 1936 film about the insurance market
  - Lloyd's building, its headquarters
  - Lloyd's Agency Network
- Lloyd's List, a website and 275-year-old daily newspaper on shipping and global trade
  - Lloyd's List Intelligence (formerly Lloyd's MIU), a maritime information database
- Lloyd's Register, a ship classification and risk management organization
- Germanischer Lloyd, a classification society based in Germany
- Norddeutscher Lloyd, a former German shipping line, and several successor companies
  - Hapag-Lloyd shipping line
  - Hapag-Lloyd Flug, Hapag-Lloyd Express, Hapag-Lloyd Airlines, former German airline companies
  - Lloyd Werft, a shipbuilding dockyard established by Norddeutscher Lloyd in Bremerhaven, Germany
  - * Lloyd Motoren Werke GmbH a German car company active between 1908 and 1963 founded by Norddeutscher Lloyd, of which most marques carried the Lloyd name
- Österreichischer Lloyd, a shipping line of the Austro-Hungarian Empire; a shipping management company of this name still exists
  - Lloyd Triestino, subsequently renamed Italia Marittima, Italian shipping line evolved from Austrian Lloyd
  - Austrian Lloyd Ship Management, a Cypriot company founded in the 20th century
- Nedlloyd, a Netherlands shipping line, later merged into P&O Nedlloyd and now part of Maersk Line
- Lloyd Aéreo Boliviano (LAB Airlines) of Bolivia

=== Other companies ===
- Lloyds Banking Group, a large banking group in the United Kingdom
- Lloyds Pharmacy, the largest community pharmacy operator in the United Kingdom
- Lloyd Italico, Italian insurance, part of Assicurazioni Generali
- Lloyd Cars Ltd, a former British automobile brand
- Lloyd's Electronics, a defunct American consumer electronics company
- Lloyd's Weekly Newspaper, an early Sunday newspaper in the United Kingdom
- Stewarts & Lloyds, a former British steel tube manufacturer
- Lloyd Hotel, Amsterdam, the Netherlands
- Lloyd's Barbecue, an American brand of barbecue products sold by Hormel
- Delta Lloyd insurance in the low countries
- Hungarian Lloyd Aircraft and Engine Factory
- Lloyd, an Indian consumer electronics brand by Havells

== Other uses ==
- Lloyd (film), a 2001 comedy written and directed by Hector Baron
- Lloyd rifle, a magazine-fed sporting rifle
- Lloyd's mirror, an optical and an acoustic experiment
- Lloyds, a barque hired by the New Zealand Company to bring settlers to Nelson

== See also ==
- Floyd (disambiguation)
- Loyd (disambiguation)
