= Lloyd Gwam =

Nigerian historian (1924–1965)

- Chike
- Born: 23 June 1924
- Education: University of Ibadan
- Occupation: Historian

Lloyd Chike Gwam (L.C. Gwam) (June 23, 1924 – July 1, 1965) was a Nigerian historian and Director of the Nigerian National Archives in Ibadan.

== Early life and education ==
L.C. Gwam was born on June 23, 1924, to Chief G.W. Gwam and Celine Adaukpo Gwam in then Eastern Nigeria. He attended Government School Asaba and Edo College for his elementary education. For his secondary education, he attended Dennis Memorial Grammar School, Onitsha. He graduated from then University College Ibadan (now University of Ibadan) in 1956 with a Bachelor of Arts in History.

== Personal life ==
Gwam married Esther Shola Garrick in 1957 and the couple had four children.

== Career ==
Gwam joined the Nigerian Civil Service in 1945 and served in many roles: Technical Adviser to the Nigerian Chief de Mission at the Inter-Governmental Conference at UNESCO, Paris on the Preservation of Cultural Property in the event of Armed Conflict, Technical Councillor of the International Council of Archives (Geneva, 1963), and succeeded Kenneth Dike as Director of Archives of the Federal Republic of Nigeria from April 1, 1964, until his death on July 1, 1965. Gwam received a commendation from the Nigerian government in 1964. Historian Harry A. Gailey noted that Gwam was instrumental in changing his views about Lord Lugard's successes as a military leader, diplomat, and administrator. Gailey also indicated that Gwam was about to write a critical "expose of Lugard's mistaken policies as applied to Western Nigeria" before his death in July 1965.

== Publications ==
Lloyd Gwam's publications include:

- The National Archives of Nigeria (1959)
- An introduction to the Nigerian National Archives (1961)
- Archives and Local Councils (1964)
- The functions of the National Archives of Nigeria (1964)
- The Writings of Dr Moses Joao Da Rocha (1875–1942)
- Great Nigerians (1967)
