= Lloyd Chukwuemeka =

Nigerian politician

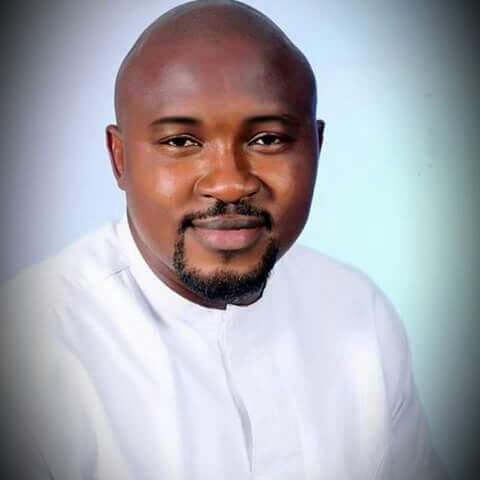
Image of Lloyd Chukwuemeka

Lloyd Chukwuemeka is a State House of Assembly member representing Owerri-North State Constituency in the Imo State House of Assembly.

Following the power tussle that plagued the Imo State House of Assembly on May 16, 2019, which brought about the resignation of the Deputy Speaker, Ugonna Ozurigbo, Lloyd Chukwuemeka was elected as the new majority leader of the Imo State House of Assembly.

On June 10, 2019, Lloyd Chukwuemeka decamped to the People Democratic Party following a mass defection at the valedictory session of the 8th Imo Assembly in Owerri, Imo State.
