= Lloyd Stein =

American football player and trainer (1907–1987)

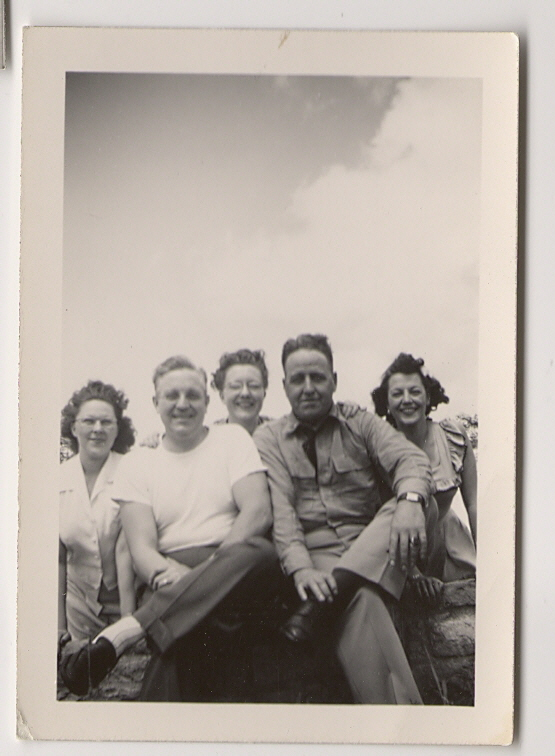
- 1945 photo of Lloyd Stein, second from right, with friends.
- Born: 1907
- Died: 1987
- Citizenship: United States
- Years active: 1932–1975
- Known for: Athletic trainer

Lloyd “Snapper” Stein (1907–1987) was a college football player and served as an athletic trainer at The University of Minnesota athletic teams for over 40 years. Stein was a member of the Minnesota Golden Gophers football team from 1928 to 1932, serving as the teams long snapper, earning him the nickname "Snapper." In 1932 he graduated from the University of Minnesota with a bachelor's degree in physical education and became the freshman athletic trainer. In 1935 he became the U of M's head athletic trainer, a position he held until his retirement in 1975. Stein was inducted into the National Athletic Trainers' Association (NATA) Hall of Fame.
