= Lloyd Bowen =

Welsh historian and academic

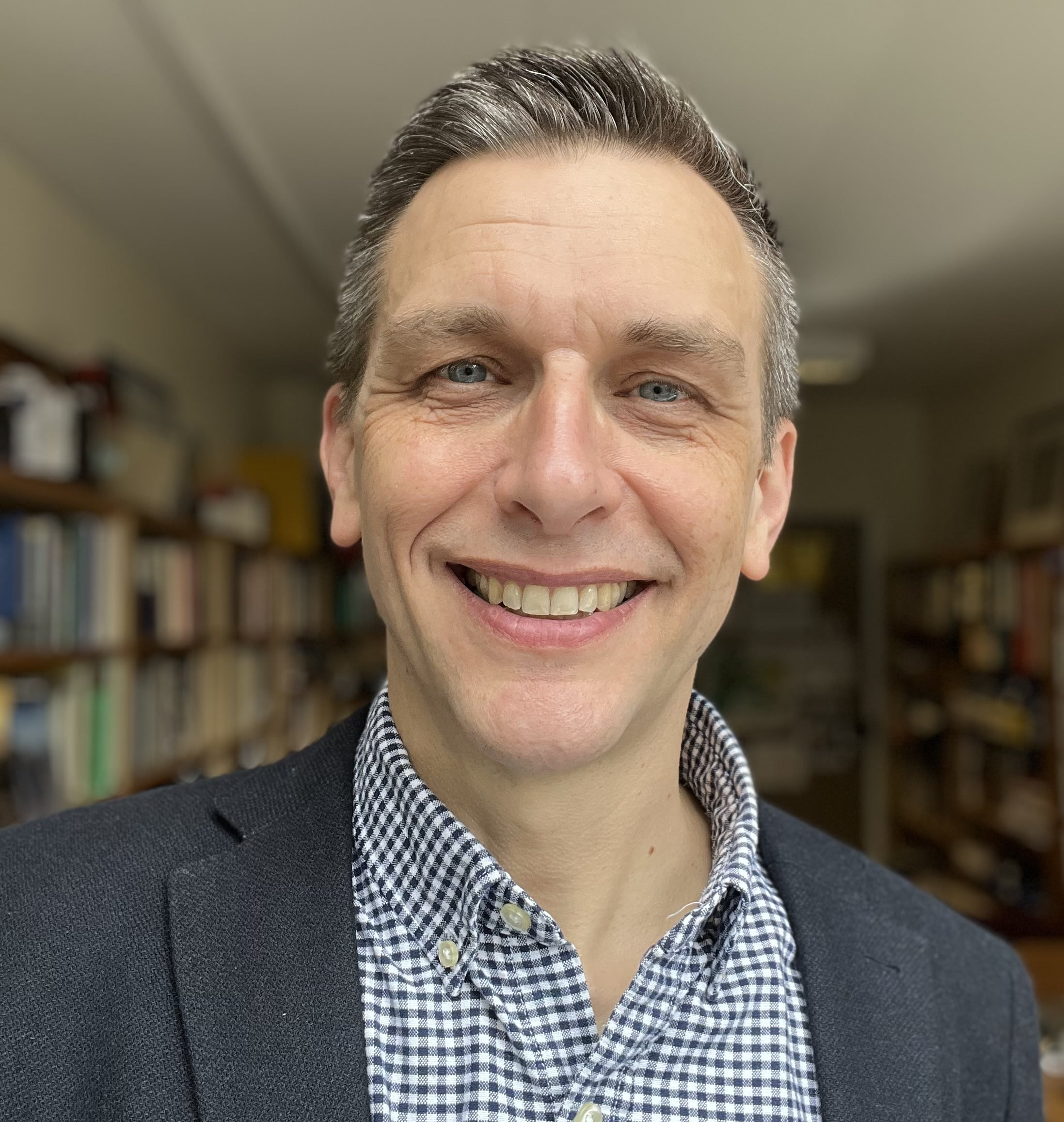
- Bowen in 2024
- Born: October 24, 1971 (age 54); Llwynypia, Rhondda Cynon Taf, Wales, U.K.
- Awards: FLSW FRHistS

Academic background
- Education: University of Exeter; Cardiff University

Academic work
- Discipline: Modern history
- Sub-discipline: British political and social history
- Institutions: Cardiff University
- Main interests: Early-modern Welsh and British history; British Civil Wars

Lloyd Bowen (born 24 October 1971) is a Welsh academic and author, whose work focuses on the political and social history of early modern Wales and Britain. He is a professor of early modern history at Cardiff University.

== Work ==
Bowen’s research focuses on the political and social history of early modern Wales and Britain, with particular attention to the relationship between local and regional politics. A significant strand of his work examines the British Civil Wars (1642–1660), including studies of royalism, gentry culture, and parliamentary politics.

He has also examined the nature of Welsh political identity following the Acts of Union, analysing the tensions between the English state and Welsh culture and highlighting the complexities of nationhood in early modern Britain.

Bowen has also published multiple monographs on early political figures such as John Poyer and Edward Vaughan, examining factionalism, early Welsh law and the beginning of the Second English Civil War.

=== Civil War Petitions Project ===
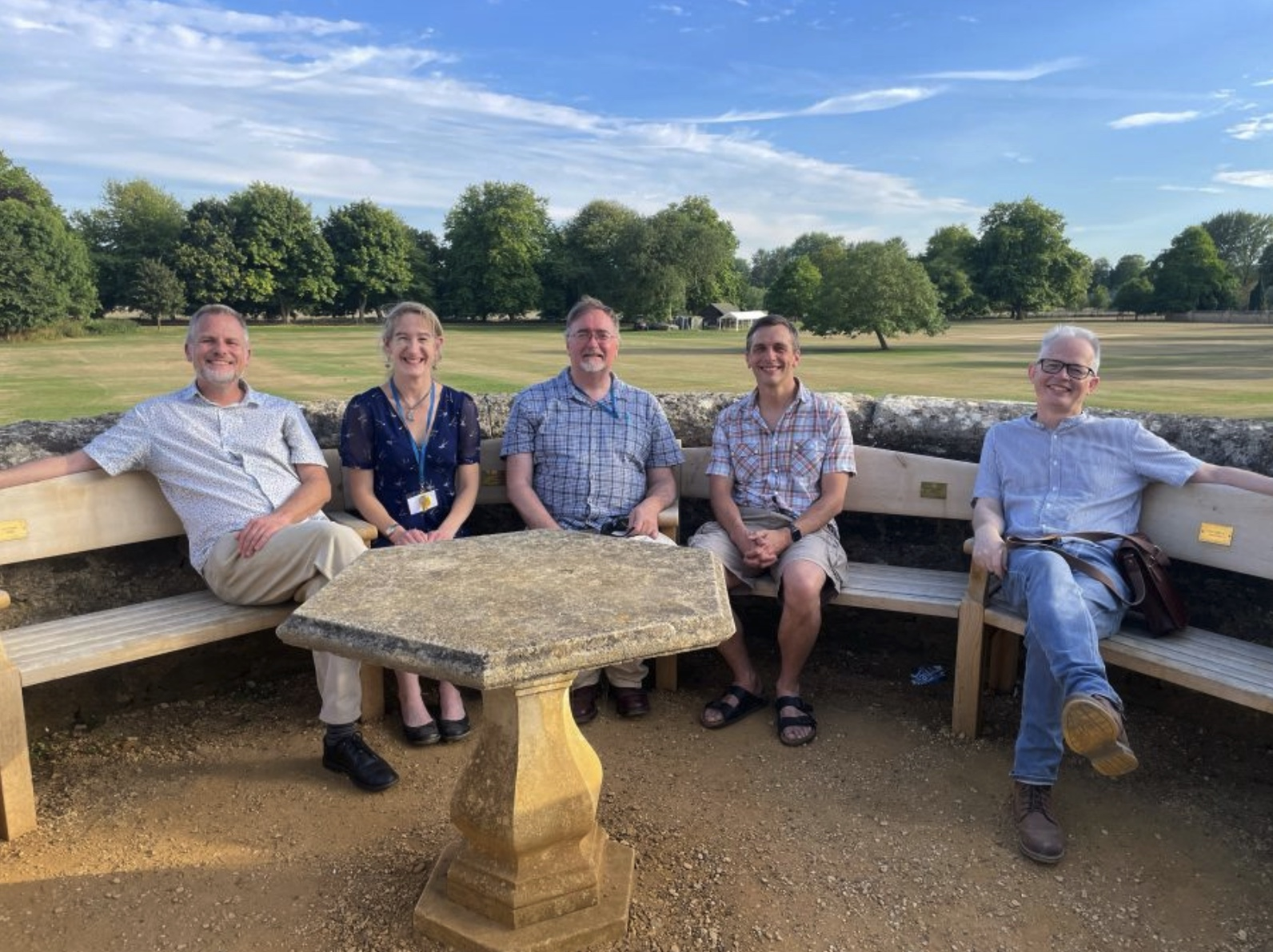
Bowen (2nd from the right) and other contributors to the petitions project.

The Civil War Petitions Project is a collaborative research effort, funded by the Arts and Humanities Research Council (AHRC) that examines petitions submitted by veterans, widows, and civilians seeking relief following the British Civil Wars. The project ran from June 2017 to October 2020 and investigated the social, political, and cultural consequences of the wars and explored how petitioning functioned as a form of communication and political participation in early modern Britain. As a co-investigator on the project, Bowen contributed through research on the language, form, and authenticity of petitions, with particular attention to Welsh perspectives. His work examines how such petitions created narratives and how memory of the Civil Wars was shaped through bureaucratic and legal processes.

== Honours and awards ==
In 2024, Bowen was elected as a fellow of the Learned Society of Wales. He is a fellow of the Royal Historical Society.

== Selected published works ==
- Family and society in early Stuart Glamorgan: the household accounts of Sir Thomas Aubrey of Llantrithyd, c.1565-1641. Cardiff: South Wales Record Society. 2006 – via Google Books.
- The politics of the principality: Wales, c.1603-1642. Cardiff: University of Wales Press. 2007 – via Google Books.
- John Poyer, the Civil Wars in Pembrokeshire and the British Revolutions. University of Wales Press. 2020 – via Google Books.
- Anatomy of a duel in Jacobean England: gentry honour, violence and the law. Woodbridge: The Boydell Press. 2021 – via Google Books.
- Bowen, Lloyd; Stoyle, Mark, eds. (2021). Remembering the English Civil Wars. Taylor & Francis – via Google Books.
- Early Modern Wales c.1536–c.1689; Ambiguous Nationhood. University of Wales Press. 2022 – via Google Books.
- The Trials of Edward Vaughan; Law, Civil War and Gentry Faction in Seventeenth-Century Britain, c.1596–1661. University of Wales Press. 2024 – via Google Books.
