= Loyd =

Loyd may refer to:

== Places ==
=== United States ===
- Loyd, Colorado
- Loyd, Illinois
- Loyd, Louisiana
- Loyd, Mississippi
- Loyd, Wisconsin, unincorporated community

== People ==
=== Given name ===
- Loyd Auerbach, professor of parapsychology
- Loyd Blankenship (born 1965), American computer hacker and author
- Loyd Christopher (1919–1991), American Major League Baseball outfielder (Boston Red Sox)
- Loyd Colson (born 1947), American Major League Baseball pitcher
- Loyd Gentry, Jr. (1925–2012), American horse trainer
- Loyd Grossman (born 1950), Anglo-American television presenter
- Loyd Jowers (1927–2000), American accused of involvement in Dr. Martin Luther King Jr.'s assassination
- Loyd Phillips (1945–2020), American football player
- Loyd Sigmon (1909–2004), American radio broadcaster
- Loyd Wheaton (1838–1918), United States general

=== Surname ===
- Anthony Loyd (born 1966), English journalist
- Arthur Loyd (1882–1944), English Conservative Party politician
- Brian Loyd (born 1973), American baseball player
- Casey Loyd (born 1989), American soccer player
- Charles Loyd (1891–1973), British Army general
- Jewell Loyd (born 1993), American basketball player
- Jordan Loyd (born 1993), Polish–American basketball player
- Lewis Vivian Loyd (1852–1908), British politician
- Paul B. Loyd, Jr., American businessperson
- Robert Loyd-Lindsay, 1st Baron Wantage (1832–1901), British general
- Sam Loyd (1841–1911), American chess player
- Samuel Jones-Loyd, 1st Baron Overstone (1796–1883), British banker and politician
- Vivian Loyd, tank designer, with Sir John Carden, 6th Baronet
- Xavier Loyd (born 2003), American football player
- Zach Loyd (born 1987), American soccer player

== See also ==
- Lloyd (disambiguation)
- Loyd Carrier, small tracked war vehicle
