= Lloyd Devereux Richards =

American writer

- Born: July 9, 1949 (age 77); New York City, U.S.
- Occupations: Novelist; Lawyer
- Writing career
- Genres: Suspense; Thriller
- Notable work: Stone Maidens

Lloyd Devereux Richards (born July 9, 1949) is an American author best known for his novel, mystery thriller Stone Maidens. Richards published Stone Maidens in 2012. Very few copies were sold over the following decade. However, in 2023 his novel rose to number one on the Amazon's best seller list in February after his daughter made a TikTok video about his novel. The TikTok went viral catapulting the book and Richards to new found fame. He has since written a sequel to Stone Maidens which was published in August 2023, and two other standalone novels. He lives in Vermont.

== Personal life ==
Richards was a lawyer before and after writing his debut novel. He resides in Montpelier, Vermont. Richards worked as an attorney.

== Publications ==
- Stone Maidens
- Maidens of the Cave: A Novel
- The Runner
- Love on the Perimeter
