= Lloyd Sharpin =

(Frederick) Lloyd Sharpin was Archdeacon of Bombay from 1886 until 1888.

Sharpin was educated at Bedford School and Exeter College, Oxford. He was ordained in 1862. After a curacy in Northill he was Chaplain at Nasirabad, often acting as Acting Archdeacon.

After his years as Archdeacon he held the living at Millbrook, Bedfordshire for 21 years; and Rural Dean of Ampthill for 11. He died on 2 June 1921.
