= Lloyd Spotted Wolf =

American football player and coach

Playing career
- ?: Adams State
- Position: Offensive lineman

Coaching career (HC unless noted)
- 2003–2004: La Cueva HS (NM) (assistant)
- 2006–2008: Blinn (OC/OL)
- 2009–2010: Bacone
- 2011–2013: Rio Rancho HS (NM) (AHC/OC/OL)
- 2014–2015: V. Sue Cleveland HS (NM) (WR)
- 2016–?: West Texas A&M (OL)

Head coaching record
- Overall: 4–16

Lloyd Spotted Wolf is an American former football player and coach. He served as the head football coach at Bacone College from 2009 to 2010, compiling a record of 4–16. He currently teaches English and coaches Defensive Line at Bridgeland High School in Cypress, Texas.

== Playing career ==
Spotted Wolf played offensive line for the Adams State College Grizzlies. He was a four-year letterman and three-year starter, and was an Academic All-Conference selection in the Rocky Mountain Athletic Conference.

== Coaching career ==
=== Assistant coaching ===
Spotted Wolf has coached at the NCAA Division I, II and III, junior college and high school levels. He is currently the Run Game Coordinator and Offensive Line Coach at Rio Rancho High School in Rio Rancho, New Mexico, where in his two seasons he has helped lead the Rams to a District 1AAAAA Championship and two playoff appearances. He has been on the coaching staff at Blinn College, Oklahoma Panhandle State University, La Cueva High School in Albuquerque, New Mexico, University of Wisconsin-Eau Claire and the University of New Mexico.

=== Bacone ===
In 2009, Spotted Wolf was named the third head football coach for the Bacone Warriors in Muskogee, Oklahoma. His coaching record at Bacone was 4–16.

== Heritage ==
Spotted Wolf is a member of the Native American Hidatsa Tribe. He also has ancestry of Seminole and Creek nations.

== Head coaching record ==
Year	Team	Overall	Conference	Standing
Bacone Warriors (Central States Football League) (2009–2010)
2009	Bacone	1–8	1–4	5th
2010	Bacone	3–8	2–3	4th
Bacone:		4–16	3–7	
Total:		4–16		
