= Billy Young (singer) =

American singer-songwriter of the 1960s (1941–1999)

William D. Young (May 25, 1941 – August 19, 1999) was an American singer-songwriter of the 1960s. He was discovered, produced, and promoted by Otis Redding. He is best known for his one major success, "The Sloopy", although he actively recorded music from 1963 to 1984 mostly in the genres of soul music and rhythm and blues.

== Personal life ==
Young was born in Dangerfield, Texas.

He later moved to the west coast of the United States. His early recordings were possibly for the Crest recording label as a member of the Classics, but the first 45 recordings under his own name was for Original Sound in 1963. On this album, Young sings in a high register with falsetto phrases.

When he moved to Macon, Georgia, Young became influenced by Otis Redding. The song "Same Thing All Over" was cut under Redding's supervision at FAME Studios in Macon, Georgia.

== Partial discography ==
- "The Sloopy", 1965, written by Otis Redding
- "Same Thing All Over", 1965, written by Otis Redding
- "Nothing's Too Much (Nothing's Too Good)", 1967, written William D. Young
- "Burning Up", 1974
