= Lloyd Rodgers =

American composer, performer and teacher

Lloyd Rodgers (born Long Beach, California June 2, 1942, died San Diego, California December 27, 2016) was an American composer, performer, concert promoter, and teacher.

== Education ==
Rodgers studied at UCLA (BA 1966, MA 1968, PhD 1970). His teachers included Roy Harris and John Vincent for composition, Robert Nelson for counterpoint, and Robert Stevenson and Nicolas Slonimsky for musicology. He studied orchestration privately with Mario Castelnuovo-Tedesco.

== Career ==
His musical circle included William Albright, Joseph Byrd, Douglas Leedy, Richard Grayson, Paul Reale, and others. Following an appointment at the University of Michigan School of Music, he served as Professor of Music at California State University, Fullerton from 1972 through 2016, where he created and directed the university's electronic music studio for many years. He was a proactive, demanding and often unconventional teacher. His introduction to counterpoint and tuning and temperament lessons often began at the hardware store, gathering materials to construct a monochord, which he referred to as "The God Machine," to explore the overtone series and tunings.

He was co-founder of the composition and performance collective Cartesian Reunion Memorial Orchestra in which he played saxophone, clarinet, and later, keyboard as well as the CSUF based scratch orchestra or Diverse Instrument Ensemble (D.I.E). He was leader of the Lloyd Rodgers Group, in which he played keyboards.

== Works ==
Major works include a piano Trio (1975) written for the Mirecourt Trio (Premiered in New York City in October 1975), numerous works written for his ensembles, and several ballets for Choreographer Rudy Perez, including Red Ice (1982), Choreographic Mix (1982), Meridian Pass (1982), Bette's Caper (1983), Triangles Red (1984), Fall-Out (1985), The Little Prince (1987), Coastal Acts (1987), Orpheus (1988), and Shifts (2003) [with Steve Moshier].

Several of his instrumental works were premiered in California by the Pacific Symphony Orchestra and in Europe by Vienna's Musik Zirkus under his longtime friend and former classmate Keith Clark. He was an energetic producer of concerts and events featuring music of his students and colleagues, as well as his own works, including Message for Garcia (2002), Catastrophe of Meaning (2001), On the Sensations of Tone (2004) and Guns into Mexico (2004).

Rodgers's music defies classification. Early on he abandoned academic serialism in favor of music inspired by Medieval mensural notation, Renaissance polyphony and Baroque counterpoint. For a period of time, he began each day with coffee and cigarettes, while composing a strict canon and fugue. His music was generally tonal or modal in character, often utilizing alternative tunings, modular forms, interlocking ostinatos and scores with open or flexible instrumentation. He was one of the earliest composers working in a post-minimal style. Aside from his works published with Material Press, he refused to copyright his music, releasing his works to the public domain to be performed without fee, as a part of his advocacy for the unrestricted dissemination of knowledge, with proper attribution.
