= Lloyd Williams (singer) =

Jamaican reggae singer of the 1960s

Lloyd Williams is a Jamaican reggae singer of the 1960s. From 1966 to 1970, Williams featured with The Tommy McCook Band, as well as a multitude of ad hoc ensembles: Soul Gang, The Highlights, and The Celestials.

== Selected discography ==
- "Back Out With It"
- "Little School Girl"
- "Burning Up"
- "Is It Because I'm Black"
