= Lloyd Mathias =

Indian business executive and entrepreneur

- Education: Somaiya Institute of Management, Mumbai University; St Xavier's College, Mumbai.
- Occupations: Entrepreneur; Business Executive
- Known for: Former CMO of Tata Teleservices; Former CMO of Motorola India; Former CMO of HP

Lloyd Mathias is an Indian business executive and an entrepreneur. He worked as a chief marketing officer at HP Inc., Motorola. He was also the chief marketing officer and the president at Tata Teleservices.

== Early life and education ==
Mathias did his master's degree in Management Studies from Somaiya Institute of Management, Mumbai University. He did his graduation from St Xavier's College, Mumbai.

== Career ==
Mathias joined PepsiCo India as the marketing head in 1994. In 2005, he quit from PepsiCo and joined Motorola as the senior director, head of sales and operations in India and South West Asia. He worked in Motorola for three years and resigned in 2008. In the same year, he joined the Tata Teleservices as president and CMO. In 2010, he was elected as the chairman of Media Research Users Council (MRUC). Then, in 2011, he left Tata Teleservices. In 2013, he was elected as Co-Chairperson of CDG's Device Strategy Council. In 2014, he joined HP Inc. as the chief marketing officer.
