= Lloyd Laing (entrepreneur) =

Jamaican businessperson (born 1978)

Lloyd George Laing Jnr
- Born: 21 January 1978 (age 48); Savannah-La-Mar, Westmoreland, Jamaica
- Occupation: Internet entrepreneur
- Known for: Digital Product Development
- Children: 5

Lloyd George Laing (born 21 January 1978) is an Internet entrepreneur based in Kingston, Jamaica.

He began his career in 1994 at Jamaica Communication Limited, where he served as a system administrator to Worldtelenet a small ISP based in Kingston. He was introduced to product development by Victor Lowe who later challenged Laing to create new product offerings to maintain WTI's market position. Laing convinced Lowe and his other partners to introduce a flat rate internet model.

He was a co-founder and a managing Partner at JL Mobile, a Jamaican-based technology research and development firm, that created the SmartTab, a low budget android tablet, piloted at the University of the West Indies in 2012.

In 2013 he founded The Jamaica App factory, a mobile app development studio, which has been involved in the development of groundbreaking web and mobile applications such as emerging music streaming service Dippso.com and appnng.com, a cloud based enterprise level SaaS provider.

In 2015 Laing was invited to the board of AnSuen Holdings LLC, a US based digital asset management firm, and helped to establish its corporate presence in Jamaica which serves to incubate concepts and accelerate early stage startups, such as the contactless payment processing platform ClickPaye a PitchIT Caribbean 2016 Top 10 finalist.

He is a lead volunteer at ThinkJamaica, a non-profit focused on bridging Jamaica's digital divide through the use of digital education, and emerging technology.

Laing runs a record label, Red Records UK.
