= Floyd (surname) =

Origin
- Origin: Welsh
- Meaning: "Gray" from Llwyd, Flood
- Region of origin: Wales, Scotland

Other names
- Variant form: Lloyd

Floyd is a surname of Welsh origin, deriving from Lloyd, which is ultimately an anglicized spelling of "Llwyd" (“gray, gray-haired”), and of Scottish origin deriving from Flood. Notable people with this surname include:

== Notable people ==
- Alfred Ernest Floyd (1877–1974), Australian musician
- Andress Small Floyd (1873–1933), founder of the Self-Master Colony
- Benjamin Rush Floyd, American politician
- Bobby Floyd (disambiguation), multiple people
- Bubba Floyd (1917–2000), American baseball player
- Carlisle Floyd (1926–2021), American opera composer
- Charles Floyd (disambiguation), several people
- Christiane Floyd (born 1943), Austrian computer scientist
- Cliff Floyd (born 1972), retired American Major League Baseball player
- Darrell Floyd (c. 1933–2000), American college basketball player
- Davis Floyd (1776–1834), American politician convicted of conspiring with Aaron Burr
- Eddie Floyd (born 1937), American R&B/soul singer-songwriter
- Elson S. Floyd (1956–2015), 10th president of Washington State University
- Emily Floyd (born 1972), Australian public artist, sculptor and printmaker
- Gavin Floyd (born 1983), Major League Baseball pitcher
- George Floyd (1973–2020), African-American man who died during a police arrest
- George Floyd (American football) (born 1960), American football player
- George Rogers Clark Floyd (1810–1895), American politician
- James Floyd (disambiguation), several people
- Jehyve Floyd (born 1997), American basketball player in the Israeli Basketball Premier League
- John Floyd (disambiguation), several people
- Keith Floyd (1943–2009), British chef
- Malcolm Floyd (born 1972), retired American football player
- Malcom Floyd (born 1981), American football player
- Pretty Boy Floyd (Charles Arthur Floyd, 1904–1934), American bank robber
- Raymond Floyd (born 1942), American golfer
- Robert W. Floyd (1936–2001), computer scientist
- Sally Floyd (1950–2019), computer scientist
- Sleepy Floyd (Eric Augustus Floyd, born 1960), American professional basketball player
- Stanley Floyd (born 1961), American track and field sprinter
- Ty Floyd (born 2001), American baseball player
- William Floyd (1734–1821), American signer of the Declaration of Independence
- William Floyd (American football), retired American football fullback

== Fictional characters ==
- Heywood R. Floyd, in the Space Odyssey series by Arthur C. Clarke
- Sally Floyd (comics), reporter in the Marvel Comics universe
- Pink Floyd, protagonist of the 1979 concept album The Wall by the band Pink Floyd
- Lt. Robert "Bob" Floyd in Top Gun: Maverick
