= Floyd (given name) =

Floyd is a masculine Anglo-Welsh given name deriving from the Welsh Llwyd ("gray, gray-haired") and thus cognate with Lloyd.

Notable people with this name include:

- Floyd Abrams (born 1936), American attorney
- Floyd Adams Jr. (1945–2014), American politician
- Floyd Allen (1856–1913), American mass murderer
- Floyd Henry Allport (1890–1979), American psychologist
- Floyd E. Anderson (1891–1976), American lawyer and politician
- Floyd Aubrey (born 2003), Australian rugby union player
- Floyd Ayité (born 1988), Togolese footballer
- Floyd Bannister (born 1955), retired Major League Baseball pitcher
- Floyd Collins (1887–1925), American pioneer caver
- Floyd Council (1911–1976), American blues musician
- Floyd Cramer (1933–1997), American pianist
- Floyd Ebaugh (1914–1980), American basketball player
- Floyd Eddings (born 1958), American football player
- Floyd J. Egan (1896–1967), American football and basketball coach
- Floyd Esquibel (born 1938), American politician
- Floyd Favors (born 1963), American boxer
- Floyd Gottfredson (1905–1986), American cartoonist best known for his work on the Mickey Mouse comic strip
- Floyd Heard (born 1966), American track and field sprinter
- Floyd Hudlow (1943–2021), American football player
- Floyd Iglehart (1934–1987), American football player
- Floyd Jaszewski (1927–2010), American football player
- Floyd "Candy" Johnson (1922–1981), American jazz musician
- Floyd Johnson (1900–1986), American boxer
- Floyd Albin Johnson (1908–1974), Canadian politician
- Floyd Jones (1917–1989), American blues singer, guitarist and songwriter
- Floyd Landis (born 1975), American cyclist
- Floyd Levine (born 1932), American film and television actor
- Floyd Little (1942–2021), American football halfback
- Floyd Mayweather Jr. (born 1977), American five-division boxing champion
- Floyd Mayweather Sr. (born 1952), American welterweight boxer and trainer
- Floyd MacMillan Davis (1896–1966), American painter and illustrator
- Floyd Odlum (1892–1976), American lawyer and businessman
- Floyd O'Brien (1904–1968), American jazz trombonist
- Floyd Odlum (1892–1976), American lawyer
- Floyd B. Olson (1891-1936), 22nd governor of Minnesota
- Floyd Patterson (1935–2006), two-time world heavyweight boxing champion
- Floyd D. Rose, inventor of Floyd Rose guitar bridge
- Floyd Simmons (1923–2008), American athlete
- Floyd Simmons (American football) (1925–1996), American football player
- Floyd Smart (1894–1955), American athlete
- Floyd Talbert (1923–1982), member of Easy Company, Band of Brothers
- Floyd Tillman (1914–2003), American country musician
- Floyd Vivino (1951–2026), American entertainer
- Floyd Volker (1921–1995), American basketball player
- Floyd Vrtiska (1926–2020), American politician* Floyd Wagstaff (1911–2000), American football and basketball coach
- Floyd L. Wakefield (1919–2007), American politician
- Floyd R. Watson (1872–1974), American experimental physicist
- Floyd Weaver (1941–2008), American baseball player
- Floyd Wedderburn (born 1976), Jamaican gridiron football player
- Floyd West (born 1980), Jamaican musician
- Floyd Westerman (1936–2007), Actor and political activist
- Floyd E. Wheeler (1905–1995), American politician, teacher, and lawyer
- Floyd K. Whittemore (1844–1907), American politician and businessman
- Floyd Wicker (born 1943), American baseball player
- Floyd Wilcox (1886–1958), President of Shimer College
- Floyd Williams (born 1939), American mathematician
- Floyd Wilson, American basketball coach
- Floyd Orson Wolfenbarger (1904–1979), American architect
- Floyd Womack (born 1978), American football player
- Floyd Wooldridge (1928–2008), American baseball player

Fictional characters:

- Floyd Lawson, barber in the TV show The Andy Griffith Show
- Floyd Lawton a.k.a. Deadshot, supervillain appearing in DC Comics
- Floyd Gerhardt, a main character on the TV series Fargo
- Floyd Pepper, on the TV series The Muppet Show

== See also ==
- Floyd (disambiguation)
- Floyd (surname)
