= Floyd =

Floyd may refer to:

== People and fictional characters ==
- Floyd (given name), a list of people and fictional characters
- Floyd (surname), a list of people and fictional characters

== Places in the United States ==
- Floyd, Arkansas, an unincorporated community
- Floyd, Iowa, a city in Floyd County
- Floyd, Ray County, Missouri, an unincorporated community
- Floyd, Washington County, Missouri, an unincorporated community
- Floyd, New Mexico, a village
- Floyd, New York, a town
- Floyd, Texas, an unincorporated community
- Floyd, Virginia, a town
- Floyd County (disambiguation)
- Floyd River, Iowa, a tributary of the Missouri River
- Floyd Township (disambiguation)
- Camp Floyd / Stagecoach Inn State Park and Museum, a short-lived U.S. Army post near Fairfield, Utah

== Sports ==
- Floyd (horse), a National Hunt racehorse
- Floyd of Rosedale, bronze trophy awarded to the winner of each college football game between Iowa and Minnesota

== Arts and entertainment ==
- "Floyd" (30 Rock), a 2010 episode of the sitcom 30 Rock
- "Floyd", a guitar used by Green Day guitarist Billie Joe Armstrong
- "Floyd", a song by Lynyrd Skynyrd from the album God & Guns, 2009
- "Floyd", a song by Kelis from Food, 2014
- Floyd: Es gibt noch Helden, German title of the 1997 video game Feeble Files by Adventure Soft
- Floyd (Mortal Kombat), a fictional character in the Mortal Kombat series

== Other uses ==
- Tropical Storm Floyd (disambiguation), various hurricanes and a cyclone
- Floyd baronets, a title in the Baronetage of the United Kingdom
- Eurogate Rail Hungary, formerly Floyd Zrt, a Hungarian private railway company

== See also ==
- Floyd's Bluff, a hill near Sioux City, Iowa
- Floyd-Jones, several people of that name
