= USS Floyd County =

1944 LST-542-class tank landing ship

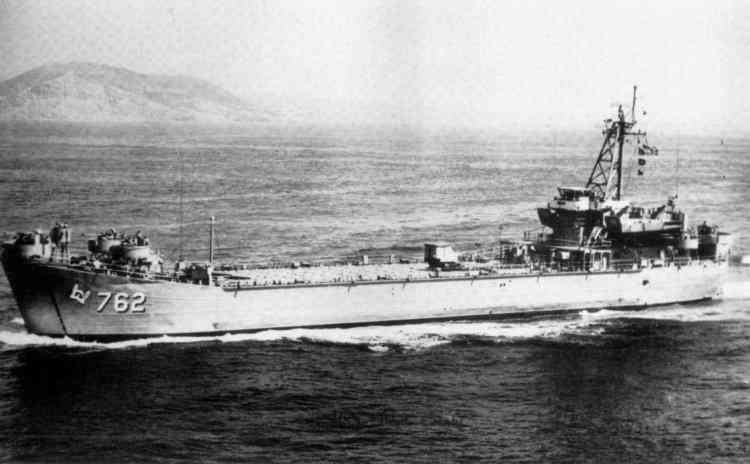
- LST-762

History

United States
- Name: USS LST-762
- Builder: American Bridge Company, Ambridge, Pennsylvania
- Laid down: 24 June 1944
- Launched: 11 August 1944
- Commissioned: 5 September 1944
- Decommissioned: March 1946
- Recommissioned: 3 November 1950
- Decommissioned: 3 September 1969
- Renamed: USS Floyd County (LST-761), 1 July 1955
- Stricken: 1 April 1975
- Identification: IMO number: 7629879
- Honors and awards: 1 battle star (World War II); 1 battle star (Korea); 3 battle stars & Meritorious Unit Commendation (Vietnam)
- Fate: Sold, 1 December 1975

General characteristics
- Class & type: LST-542-class tank landing ship
- Displacement: 1,625 long tons (1,651 t) light; 4,080 long tons (4,145 t) full
- Length: 328 ft (100 m)
- Beam: 50 ft (15 m)
- Draft: Unloaded : 2 ft 4 in (0.71 m) forward; 7 ft 6 in (2.29 m) aft; Loaded : 8 ft 2 in (2.49 m) forward; 14 ft 1 in (4.29 m) aft
- Propulsion: 2 × Fairbanks Morse Opposed 6 12-567 diesel engines, single shaft, single rudder
- Speed: 12 knots (22 km/h; 14 mph)
- Boats & landing craft carried: 2 LCVPs
- Troops: 16 officers, 147 enlisted men
- Complement: 7 officers, 104 enlisted men
- Armament: 1 × single 3"/50 caliber gun mount; 8 × 40 mm guns; 12 × 20 mm guns

USS Floyd County (LST-762) was an LST-542-class tank landing ship built for the United States Navy during World War II. Named after counties in Georgia, Indiana, Iowa, Kentucky, Texas, and Virginia, she was the only U.S. Naval vessel to bear the name.

LST-762 was laid down on 24 June 1944 at Ambridge, Pennsylvania by the American Bridge Company; launched on 11 August 1944; sponsored by Mrs. Margaret M. Ewing; and commissioned on 5 September 1944.

== Service history ==
During World War II, LST-762 was assigned to the Asiatic-Pacific theater and participated in the assault and occupation of Okinawa Gunto in April 1945. Following the war, she performed occupation duty in the Far East until mid-November 1945. The ship was decommissioned in March 1946, and reactivated on 3 November 1950 for service in the Korean War. In 1953-54 LST-762 was assigned to TF-7, providing support for the Castle-series of nuclear weapons tests. LST-762 transported the Castle-Bravo device, the first H-bomb, to the test site on Bikini Atoll, and was moored at Eniwitok Atoll some 38 miles away when the device was detonated on 1 March 1955. On 1 July 1955 she was redesignated USS Floyd County (LST-762). Following the Korean War, she operated with the Pacific Fleet Amphibious Force, including extensive service off South Vietnam from 1965 through 1968. During July 1965 she escorted the 9 Point-class cutters of Coast Guard Squadron One, Division 11, from U.S. Naval Base Subic Bay to An Thoi Naval Base, Phu Quoc Island, Vietnam and served for a short period as their support ship after reaching the island. Floyd County completed two further deployments to Vietnam 1966-1968 including supplying riverine warfare bases on the Mekong River, serving as mother ship for the pioneer group of 12 PBR gunboats with crews at Cat Lo Naval Base, near Vũng Tàu. For a short period in 1966 she was anchored in Vũng Tàu Harbor, Vietnam, serving as a base of operations for a U.S. Army gunship fire team from the 197th Armed Helicopter Company. The fire team had been assigned to provide air cover for Navy Swift Boat operations prior to the arrival Navy Seal Wolf gunships. later she provided material support from Da Nang to the U.S. Marine Corps Cửa Việt Base, immediately south of the Vietnamese Demilitarized Zone. Floyd County returned from her final Vietnam deployment November 1968. Floyd County was again decommissioned on 3 September 1969. Laid up in the Pacific Reserve Fleet, the ship was struck from the Naval Vessel Register on 1 April 1975.

LST-762 earned one battle star for World War II service, one for the Korean War, and three battle stars and an award of the Meritorious Unit Commendation for service in the Vietnam War.

== Commercial career ==
Sold for scrapping on 1 December 1975 by the Defense Reutilization and Marketing Service, the ship was again sold to Max Rouse & Sons of Beverly Hills, California on 4 December 1975. Taken in hand by Lake Union Dry Dock Company of Seattle, Washington and converted for commercial use, the ship was sold to Landing System Technology Pte. Ltd., of Singapore (Lauritz Kloster, Norway) and renamed LST-1 in 1976. Arrived at Piraeus, having been acquired by Maritime & Commercial Company Argonaftis S.A., Panama, (Greek flag) and renamed Petrola 141 on 30 June 1978, she was placed in service in July 1980. The ship was sold for scrapping in 1988.

== See also ==
- List of United States Navy LSTs
