= Wolfenbarger =

Wolfenbarger is a surname and an altered form of Swiss German Wolfensberger surname, and may refer to:

- Floyd Orson Wolfenbarger (1904–1979), American architect active in Kansas
- Janet C. Wolfenbarger (born 1958), American military general in the United States Air Force

== See also ==
- David Wolfenberger (born 1969), American singer and songwriter
