= James Floyd =

James Floyd may refer to:

- James Krishna Floyd (born 1985), British actor
- James C. Floyd (born 1914), Canadian aerospace engineer
- John Floyd (pioneer) (1750–1783), pioneer of the Midwestern United States
- James H. Floyd (1920–1974), American politician
  - James H. Floyd State Park, Summerville, Georgia
- J. T. Floyd (born 1989), American football player
- James R. Floyd, chief executive of Muscogee (Creek) Nation
- Jim Bob Floyd (born 1929), American concert pianist
