= Fluellen =

Character in Shakespeare's play Henry V

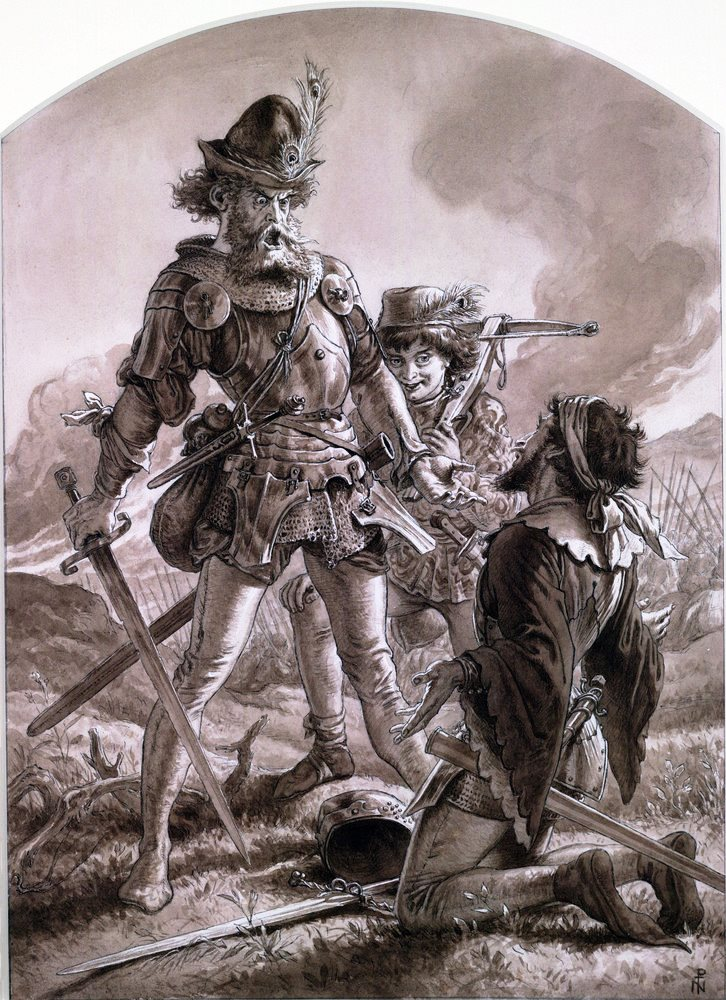
Fluellen intimidates the cowering Pistol, watercolour by Joseph Noel Paton

Fluellen is a fictional character in the play Henry V by William Shakespeare. Fluellen is a Welsh captain, a leader of a contingent of troops in the small army of King Henry V of England while on campaign in France during the Hundred Years' War. He is a comic figure, whose characterisation draws on stereotypes of the Welsh at that time, but he is also portrayed as a loyal, brave and dedicated soldier.

== Name ==
The name 'Fluellen' is an anglicised version of the Welsh language Llywelyn. The Welsh sound [ɬ] does not exist in English, but is perceived by English speakers as similar to sequence fl. A similar process of anglicisation can be seen with Floyd for Llwyd (Lloyd being an alternative anglicisation retaining the double L, but changing the spelling of the vowel).

== Character ==
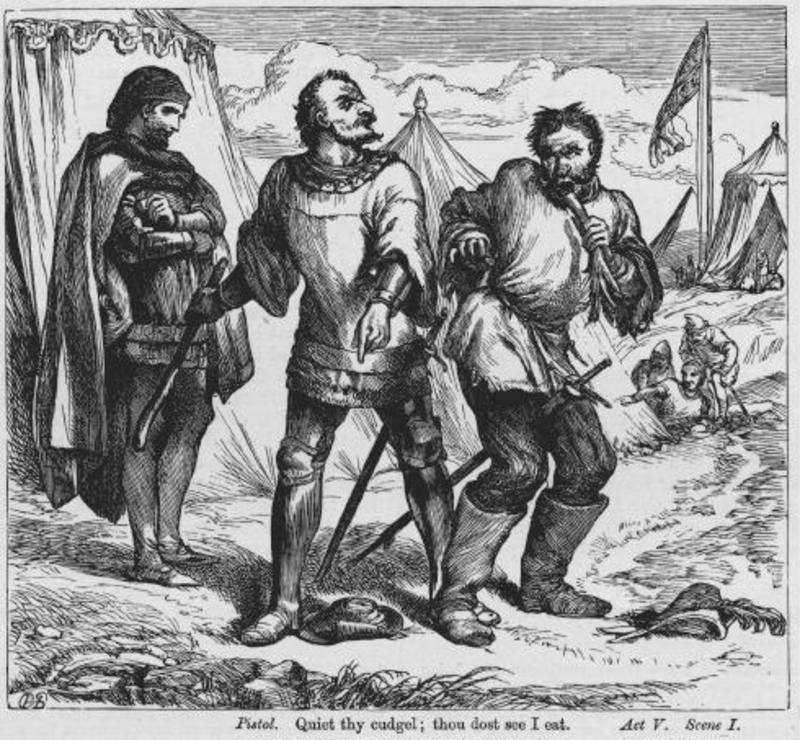
Fluellen forces Pistol to eat a leek. Illustration to Shakespeare's Henry V by H. C. Selous

Shakespeare adheres to his seemingly common principle of portraying Welsh characters in his plays as basically comedic, offering the audience an opportunity to mock the manners, language, temperament and outmoded attitudes of their Celtic neighbours; compare with Glendower in Henry IV, Part 1 and Sir Hugh Evans the Welsh Parson in The Merry Wives of Windsor. All are wordy 'Welsh windbags' with amusing speech patterns and pronunciations, reactionary, overly sensitive and pedantic to a degree. Fluellen's obsession with proper military procedure epitomises this.

Fluellen does, however, have some 281 lines in Henry V. Neither a peripheral character nor merely comic in nature but a character well rounded, he affords humour but avoids buffoonery; generates great affection from the audience; and has poignancy, scope and dramatic range.

We see him first as a soldier, albeit driving rather than leading his men into the breach. This appearance comes after the bombastic "Once more unto the breach..." speech delivered by the King as he drives the comic stragglers Bardolph, Nym, Pistol, and the Boy toward the enemy. Soon after, his character is fleshed out, with the emphasis on Fluellen's much mentioned "disciplines of the wars", with the first opportunity for a smirk at his accent, mannerisms and delivery (e.g., the Welsh "B" is far less voiced than the English "B", leading English hearers to half-mistake it for a "P", hence, "Alexander the Pig").

Lest there be underestimation of the Welshman's qualities as the play progresses, it is the King himself whom Shakespeare has deliver the words:

Though it appear a little out of fashion,
There is much care and valour in this Welshman.

By the end of the play, the audience comes to share the King's perspective. The affection for the character is secured by Fluellen's words after the miraculous victory at Agincourt, when the French herald, Montjoy, comes to cede for peace. Fluellen's relief and joy bursts out in his exchange with the King who says (with reference to his own birth in Monmouth) "I am Welsh, you know, good countryman" leading to Fluellen's tearful "By Jeshu, I am your majesty's countryman, I care not who know it; I will confess it to all the 'orld: I need not to be ashamed of your majesty, praised be God, so long as your majesty is an honest man."

Another scene towards the end also undermines the mockery of the Welsh Fluellen: Ancient Pistol mocks Fluellen for wearing a leek in his cap on Saint David's Day, in commemoration of a legendary Welsh victory against the Saxons. Fluellen beats Pistol and makes him eat the raw leek. His comrade-in-arms, Gower, comments, "You thought, because he could not speak English in the native garb, he could not therefore handle an English cudgel: you find it otherwise; and henceforth let a Welsh correction teach you a good English condition."

== Origins ==
The character of Fluellen draws on stereotypes of Welsh characters in the era, and may have been influenced by the character Lluellen (Llywelyn ap Gruffudd) in George Peele's play The Famous Chronicle of King Edward the First. He may well also have origins based on historical figures who may have been familiar to at least some of the contemporary theatre audience; comparisons have been made between Fluellen and two real life Welsh soldiers. One was Sir Dafydd ap Llewelyn, known as David Gam, a medieval Welshman who fought for King Henry IV of England and his son against Owain Glyndŵr during the Welsh rebellion of the early 15th century and subsequently accompanied Henry V of England to France where he was killed at the Battle of Agincourt. Gam ("Davy Gam") is mentioned by name in the play as one of the casualties, and thus as clearly a separate person from Fluellen.

Another possible source is an Elizabethan era Welsh soldier of fortune Roger Williams. A national hero in the wars against Spain, he would certainly have been known to audiences at the time the play was written and performed. Williams, who died in 1595, was a close ally of the Earl of Essex, and had been given a large public funeral in St Paul's cathedral four years before the play was written. Julian S. Corbett wrote that Williams "with his professional pedantry, his quaint and forcible turns of speech, his vanity and cool valour, was another 'Fluellen'.". Shakespeare scholar J. Dover Wilson suggested that Fluellen was intended as "a careful and unmistakable portrait—a real portrait—of Sir Roger Williams, the Welsh soldier who had accompanied Essex during the French campaign of 1592 and had died, tended by Essex to the last, in 1595." He went on to claim that this was evidence that the play promoted the Essex's 1599 expedition to Ireland, to which the Chorus specifically refers: "That this old friend [of the Earl] should reappear in a stage-representation of Agincourt four years later is strong evidence that the play was intended to be associated with the hope of England."

Fluellen and Bardolph are also Stratford names that appear on the 1592 recusant list, alongside that of William Shakespeare's father.

== Actors playing Fluellen on screen ==
Fluellen has been portrayed by several notable actors such as:

- Esmond Knight in Laurence Olivier's film version
- Ken Farrington in the 1960 BBC production An Age of Kings
- Tim Wylton in the BBC Television Shakespeare adaptation in 1979 on UK television
- Ian Holm in Kenneth Branagh's film version
- Owen Teale in 2012 as part of the BBC The Hollow Crown series.

== Actors playing Fluellen on stage ==
- Willow Oliveira in Elm Shakespeare's Henry V

== Legacy ==
- The Royal Navy had an anti-submarine naval trawler during World War II named HMS Fluellen
- There is a professional theatre company based in Swansea, Wales named after him. Fluellen Theatre Company.

=== Fluellenism ===
In his 1974 article, On Fluellen's Figures, Christ Figures, and James Figures, Shakespeare scholar Richard Levin coined the word "fluellenism" to refer to the habit of critics to construct arguments from mere coincidences, when trying to prove that Shakespeare was modelling his characters on real historical figures. The coinage draws on the speech in Henry V where Fluellen argues that King Henry was a descendant of Alexander the Great because they were both born in towns with rivers, and that both rivers had salmon swimming in them.
