= John G. Crawford =

American politician (born 1946)

Member of the Georgia House of Representatives from the 5th district
- In office January 8, 1979 – April 30, 1990
- Preceded by: Jerry H. Money
- Succeeded by: Tim Perry
- In office February 12, 1975 – January 10, 1977
- Preceded by: James H. Floyd
- Succeeded by: Jerry H. Money

Personal details
- Born: John Gilliland Crawford; July 5, 1946 (age 80) Chattooga County, Georgia, U.S.
- Party: Democratic
- Spouse: Carolyn Dooley
- Children: 2
- Education: University of Georgia (BSA)

Military service
- Allegiance: United States
- Branch/service: United States Marine Corps
- Years of service: 1969–1971

John Gilliland Crawford (born July 5, 1946) is an American politician.

== Early life and education ==
Crawford was born on July 5, 1946, in Chattooga County, Georgia. After graduating from the University of Georgia in 1968, he spent two years in the United States Marine Corps. By profession, he is a farmer.

== Political career ==
On February 11, 1975, at age 28, Crawford won a special election to the Georgia House of Representatives. He was elected to replace James H. Floyd, who had died in office. Crawford served until 1977, then returned to the chamber following a victory in 1978. He remained a member of the House until his resignation in 1990. During his final term, Crawford served as vice-chairman of the Natural Resources & Environment Committee.

== Personal life ==
Crawford resides in Lyerly, Georgia. He has two children and is a Presbyterian.
