= Robert Floyd =

Robert Floyd may refer to:

- Robert Floyd (actor) (born 1967), television and film actor
- Robert L. Floyd (1918–2007), mayor of Miami, Florida
- R. J. Floyd (Robert J. Floyd), state legislator in Florida
- Robert W. Floyd (1936–2001), computer scientist
- Robert Floyd (diplomat) (born 1957), Australian scientist and diplomat
- Robert "Bob" Floyd, a fictional pilot in the 2022 film Top Gun: Maverick

== See also ==
- Bobby Floyd (disambiguation), several people
