= Taylor Ridge (disambiguation) =

Taylor Ridge can refer to:

- Taylor Ridge, a ridge in Antarctica
- Taylor Ridge (Georgia), a ridge in the U.S. state of Georgia
- Taylor Ridge, Illinois, an unincorporated community in Rock Island County, Illinois, United States
