= John Floyd =

John Floyd may refer to:

- John Floyd (died 1588), English Protestant martyred with William Pikes
- John Floyd (American football) (born 1956), American football wide receiver
- John Floyd (basketball), American college basketball coach, mostly at Texas A&M
- John Floyd (Georgia politician) (1769–1839), United States representative from Georgia
- John Floyd (Jesuit) (1572–1649), English Jesuit preacher
- John Floyd (pioneer) (1750–1783), American settler in Kentucky
- John Floyd (rugby league) (born 1950), Australian rugby league footballer
- John Floyd (Virginia politician) (1783–1837), governor of Virginia and United States representative from Virginia
- John Ashton Floyd, English sculptor
- John B. Floyd (1806–1863), governor of Virginia, United States Secretary of War, and Confederate general
- John B. Floyd (West Virginia politician) (1854–1935), West Virginia politician
- John C. Floyd (1858–1930), United States representative from Arkansas
- John E. Floyd (born 1937), Canadian economist
- John G. Floyd (1806–1881), United States representative from New York
- Sir John Floyd, 1st Baronet (1748–1818), British soldier

== See also ==
- J. Floyd King (1842–1915), United States representative from Alabama
- Johnny Floyd (1891–1965), American football and basketball player and coach
- Johnny W. Floyd (1938–2024), member of the Georgia House of Representatives
