= Nelson Antrim Crawford =

American author and journalist (1888–1963)

Nelson Antrim Crawford (May 4, 1888 – 1963), was an American writer, editor, professor, and publisher.

== Biography ==
Nelson Antrim Crawford was born on May 4, 1888, in Miller, South Dakota. He went to high school in Council Bluffs, Iowa. He edited the Kansas Industrialist from 1914 to 1925.

Crawford became the editor of Household magazine of Topeka, Kansas, in 1928. He was the longtime editor of The Author & Journalist published in Topeka. He became its owner and editor with the October 1951 issue. He wrote several books, including The Ethics of Journalism (1924) and We Liberals (1936). He was the author of two novels, A Man of Learning (1928) and Unhappy Wind (1930).

== Nelson Antrim Crawford House ==
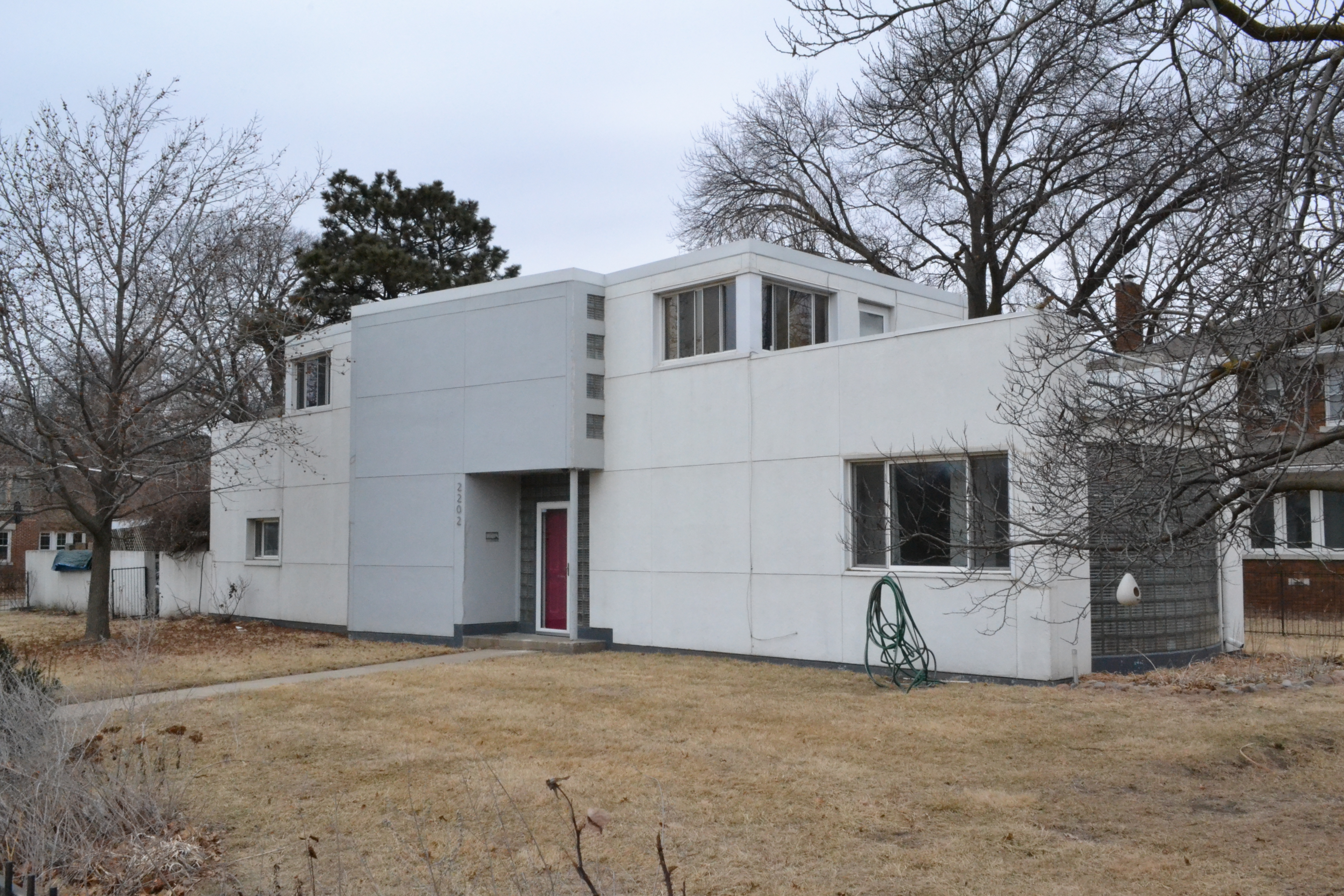
Nelson Antrim Crawford House

Nelson Antrim Crawford House (1938), was his residence located at 2202 SW Seventeenth Street in Topeka, Shawnee County, Kansas. It is listed on the National Register of Historic Places since 2017. It was designed by architect Floyd Orson Wolfenbarger.

== Writings ==
- The Ethics of Journalism (1924)
- Cats Holy and Profane
- Agricultural Journalism, Charles Elkins Rogers co-author

=== Poetry ===
- The Carrying of the Ghost, (1923) B. J. Brimmer Company, Boston

=== Novels ===
- A Man of Learning (1928)
- Unhappy Wind (1930)

=== Articles ===
- Review of History of Journalism
