= Jerry H. Money =

American politician

Jerry Money

Member of the Georgia House of Representatives from the 5th district
- In office 1977–1979
- Preceded by: John G. Crawford
- Succeeded by: John G. Crawford

Personal details
- Born: Jerry High Money; February 8, 1946 Chattooga County, Georgia, U.S.
- Died: October 12, 1990 (aged 44)
- Party: Democratic
- Education: Jacksonville State University

Jerry High Money (February 8, 1946 – October 12, 1990) was an American politician. He served as a Democratic member for the 5th district of the Georgia House of Representatives.

== Life and career ==
Money was born in Chattooga County, Georgia. He attended Jacksonville State University.

Money served in the Georgia House of Representatives from 1977 to 1979.

Money died in October 1990, at the age of 44.
