= White Oak Mountain =

Mountain in southeast Tennessee, United States

Highest point
- Elevation: 1,495 ft (456 m)
- Prominence: 585 ft (178 m)
- Coordinates: 35°08′57″N 85°01′26″W

Geography
- Location: Southeast Tennessee, Northwest Georgia
- Parent range: Ridge-and-Valley Appalachians

White Oak Mountain is a ridge located in northwestern Georgia and southeastern Tennessee. The ridge is part of the Ridge and Valley Appalachians.

== Description ==
White Oak Mountain is one of a series of paralleling ridges running approximately north-northeast in the Tennessee Valley between the Cumberland Plateau/Mountains to the west and the Blue Ridge Mountains to the east. The ridge averages 1,368 feet above sea level, the highest point being 1,495 feet. The ridge begins on the north side of Ringgold Gap, the site of an 1863 Civil War battle, in Catoosa County just east of Ringgold. Interstate 75, US 41/76, and a CSX Railroad run through this gap. The ridge continues to the south as Taylor Ridge, although it is part of the same geologic formation. The ridge has several gaps through which major highways run, including (from south to north) SR 320 near East Brainerd, Standifer Gap Road, SR 317 near Collegedale, and US 11/64 near Ooltewah in Dead Man's Gap. North of Ooltewah, the Hamilton-Bradley County line follows the westernmost part of the rudge. Southwest of Cleveland, I-75 crosses the ridge in an artificially cut gap. West of Cleveland, SR 312 crosses the ridge in Mahan Gap. The ridge ends just south of the community of Georgetown.
