= The Author & Journalist =

American magazine

- Categories: Writing, books, magazines
- Frequency: Monthly (1916–66); erratic (1967–69)
- Publisher: Privately owned
- Founder: Willard E. Hawkins
- First issue: January 1916
- Final issue Number: March–April 1969; 610 issues
- Country: United States
- Based in: Denver, Colorado (1916–48); Boulder, Colorado (1948–51); Topeka, Kansas (1951–59); Boulder, Colorado (1959–62); Denver, Colorado (1962–64); Washington, D. C. (1965–69)
- Language: English

The Author & Journalist (A&J) was a monthly writers' magazine started by editor and author Willard E. Hawkins (1887–1970) and published in Denver, Colorado. It lasted until the issue of March–April 1969, by which time it was published by Larston D. Farrar in Washington, D.C. During the pulp magazine era, it was a de facto trade journal, alongside Writer's Digest, for the pulp publishers and freelance contributors. In the 1950s, the magazine gradually returned to mainstream literary concerns and markets.

== History ==
The magazine was originally titled The Student Writer, and ran under that name from January 1916 through September 1923. It focused on writing technique. Editor Hawkins was a regular contributor to the pulps, even placing the lead story in the first issue of pioneering fantasy magazine Weird Tales (March 1923).

The magazine steadily added an emphasis on the freelance magazine market. With the December 1921 issue, it was published in a greatly enlarged form, including the Literary Market Tips column which listed the needs of buying periodicals, and the quarterly Handy Market List which attempted to list the majority of freelance markets for writers. With this issue, future editor David Raffelock (1896-1988) joined the editorial staff.

Edwin Hunt Hoover (1887–1972), whose fiction was found in People's Story Magazine and other pulp-fiction magazines, joined the editorial staff with the September 1923 issue.

With the October 1923 issue, the magazine was renamed The Author & Journalist.

With the December 1928 issue, John T. Bartlett (~1892–1947), business editor, became business manager, and half-owner, with wife Margaret A. Bartlett (1892–1949), of the magazine. They used savings accumulated as freelance writers. The couple worked together in 1909 on the editorial staff of the Pinkerton Academy yearbook The Critic. Both were also students of poet Robert Frost at Pinkerton. The Bartletts’ daughter, Margaret Bartlett Anderson, published a correspondence collection, Robert Frost and John Bartlett: The Record of a Friendship, which includes biographical material on her parents (Holt, Rinehart and Winston, 1963).

With the May 1940 issue, John T. and Margaret A. Bartlett became sole owners of the magazine. Hawkins stepped down as editor, but remained to write The Student Writer column. Hawkins’s last Student Writer column—on "Crime Fiction Formulas"—for the magazine was in the May 1946 issue. With that he sold his Denver printing business and retired to the country.

John T. Bartlett died on January 23, 1947, leaving Margaret as the sole owner. In the December 1949 issue, Margaret A. Bartlett announced that it would be her last issue as editor. She died, following a lengthy illness, on November 28, 1949. Alan Swallow (1915–66), author of the Advising the Beginner column, purchased the magazine with three friends. Raffelock and Swallow shared editing responsibilities. Raffelock disappeared from the magazine without fanfare after the September 1950 issue, and became a freelance writer, while Swallow became the sole editor.

With the October 1951 issue, Nelson Antrim Crawford (1888–1963), longtime editor and author, became the new owner and editor. He had edited Household magazine, of Topeka, Kansas, since 1928. He also wrote several books, including The Ethics of Journalism (1924) and We Liberals (1936). He was the author of two novels, A Man of Learning (1928) and Unhappy Wind (1930). Under Crawford’s reign, A&J was published in Topeka.

With the July 1959 issue, Newell Edward Fogelberg (1916–1997), who was born the year the magazine was established, became the new publisher and editor, assisted by his wife Josephine. The city of publication moved to Boulder, Colorado. Fogelberg had a rich background in editing and publishing. Possessing a journalism degree from Northwestern University, he worked for metropolitan newspapers. He published fiction in Liberty and other magazines. He founded Colorado Adventureland magazine, which he continued to publish. Josephine K. Fogelberg became editor with the March 1961 issue, and owner with the June 1961 issue.

With the November 1962 issue, Harold Earle Ellithorpe (1925–1988) became the new owner and editor. A Denver native, he earned an A.B. in journalism and a master's in social ideologies, both from the University of Denver. He worked for the International News Service, The Denver Post, and Denver's Daily Journal. Under Ellithorpe's ownership, the magazine didn't publish the issues from November 1963 through January 1964, and October 1964 through March 1965.

With the April 1965 issue, Larston Dawn Farrar (1915–1970) became the new owner, moving the magazine to Washington, D.C., where his business was located, and hiring others as editors. (The September 1964 issue, therefore, was the last one under Ellithorpe. Ellithorpe joined Farrar's Editorial Advisory Board.) Farrar started his journalism career as a copy boy. He later received an A.B. from Millsaps College, Jackson, Mississippi, in 1940. In 1942, he became associate editor of Nation’s Business, after which he became an independent writer of books under his own name, while ghosting books for famous figures. His books include the nonfiction Washington Lowdown (1956), the paperback novel The Sins of Sandra Shaw (1958), Successful Writers and How They Work (1959), and his last book, the novel Conflict of Interest (1970). In his first issue of Author & Journalist, he declared: "Our goals are all constructive, they are attainable in the context of the American system, and they are designed, in final effect, to help writers to enjoy more of the fruits of the Great Society, whose concepts we endorse fully."

Despite Farrar’s intention to restore the magazine as a monthly, problems with recordkeeping and printing caused him to reduce the last three issues of 1965 to a single October–November–December issue, to give him a chance to reorganize. A similar situation resulted in the August and September 1966 issues being combined. In 1967, the stresses of regular publication began to show; only six issues were produced. With the last issue of the year, dated October–November–December, Farrar took over as editor and his formerly robust Editorial Advisory Board, which had listed nine names, disappeared from the pages. Farrar was the last remaining name on the masthead. The magazine resembled less a professional production and more a newsletter with numerous elements in typewriter typeface. There were only three issues published in 1968 (January–February, March–April, and May–June), and two known issues in 1969 (January–February, March–April). The last issue has an ad soliciting subscription renewals, and no obvious clues that cancellation was in the offing. The back cover of the last issue has an ad for Farrar’s book, How to Make $18,000 a Year Free-Lance Writing.

== Editor table ==
A&J typically listed a main editor and one or more associate editors. The below table shows the main editors throughout the magazine's history. In the two instances where no main editor was listed, presumably the owner performed those responsibilities.

Editor	First issue	Last issue	# of issues	Note
Willard E. Hawkins	Jan 1916	Apr 1940	291	A&J founder; last month credit may be an error
unlisted	May 1940	Mar 1941	10	presumably the Bartletts; only associate editors listed
John T. & Margaret A. Bartlett	Apr 1941	Jan 1947	69	
Margaret A. Bartlett	Feb 1947	Dec 1949	35	following death of John T. Bartlett
Alan Swallow & David Raffelock	Jan 1950	Sep 1950	9	following death of Margaret A. Bartlett
Alan Swallow	Oct 1950	Sep 1951	12	
Nelson Antrim Crawford	Oct 1951	Jun 1959	93	
Newell E. Fogelberg	Jul 1959	Feb 1961	20	
J. K. Fogelberg	Mar 1961	Oct 1962	20	
Harold Ellithorpe	Nov 1962	Sep 1964	20	
Lynne L. Daniels	Apr 1965	May 1965	2	Larston D. Farrar era begins
Betty Todd	Jun 1965	Aug 1965	3	
Elizabeth Weeks	Sep 1965	Jun 1966	10	
unlisted	Jul 1966	Jul 1966	1	presumably Larston D. Farrar
Thomas Calvert McClary	Aug 1966	Jan 1967	5	
Jim Atkins	Mar 1967	Aug 1967	4	
Larston D. Farrar	Oct 1967	Mar 1969	6	
TOTAL	Jan 1916	Mar 1969	610	

== Content ==
In the December 1929–December 1930 issues, Hawkins ran a 13-part series by Edwin Baird titled How to Write a Detective Story. Baird had purchased Hawkins’s short story "The Dead Man’s Tale" for the first issue of Weird Tales. The series is an example of the magazine’s increasing emphasis on genre fiction, growing out of the success of the pulps.

Allen Glasser (1908–71), of Brooklyn, New York, had contributed articles in the early 1930s. He joined the magazine as contest editor with the June 1965 issue. Glasser had been active in early science fiction fandom, and has been called "the first real science fiction fan." Under his auspices, in the Oct–Nov–Dec 1965 issue, in a new Student Writer Section, the magazine introduced fictional content, something which it had never done in the past. The first short story featured was "In Memory of Oranges" by Deloris Tarzan. Glasser left the magazine when it contracted after the August–September 1967 issue.

The last issue, January–February 1969, contains two page-length poems by editor Larston D. Farrar, both commemorating the two recent assassination victims: "Our Bobby Is Gone (For Those Who Admired Him)," and "Oh! Martin Luther King—A Prophet in His Time."

== See also ==
- "Bartletts at A. & J. Helm", The Author & Journalist, May 1940.
- John T. Bartlett, "Mostly Personal" (column), Author & Journalist, June 1946. Announces Hawkins retirement.
- Margaret A. Bartlett, "Mostly Personal" (column), Author & Journalist, February 1947. John T. Bartlett obituary.
- "M.A.B.," The Author & Journalist, January 1950. Margaret Abbott Bartlett obituary.
- Marian Castle, "New Pilots of the A. & J.", The Author & Journalist, January 1950. Includes photo of the new management.
- Alan Swallow, Mostly Personal (column), Author & Journalist, February 1950. Discusses the changes planned by the new regime.
- David Raffelock, "Mostly Personal" (column), Author & Journalist, May 1950. Discusses the origin of the magazine.
- Alan Swallow, "I Introduce a New Editor", Author & Journalist, October 1951. Introduction of Nelson Antrim Crawford.
- Nelson Antrim Crawford, "Come, gather round", Author & Journalist, October 1951.
- Nelson Antrim Crawford, "Your New Editor and Publisher", Author & Journalist, July 1959. Introduction of Newell E. Fogelberg.
- Newell E. Fogelberg, "Your Editor To You", Author & Journalist, July 1959.
- "A Statement of Belief", Author & Journalist, November 1962. Announcement of Harold E. Ellithorpe as new owner.
- "Flash!," Author & Journalist, November 1962, 32. Back cover subscription ad describes the magazine’s new features.
- Associated Press, "Nelson Crawford, Publisher, 75, Dies", The New York Times, July 2, 1963.
- "Introducing… The Man Who Bought Author & Journalist", Author & Journalist, April 1965. Larston D. Farrar introduction.
- Larston D. Farrar, "A Statement By Larston D. Farrar, Publisher, Author & Journalist", Author & Journalist, Oct–Nov–Dec 1965. Explanation for two skipped months.
- Larston D. Farrar, "Special Notice", Author & Journalist, Aug–Sep 1966, 7. Explanation for skipped month.
- Associated Press, "Alan Swallow, 51, Publisher, Dead", The New York Times, November 28, 1966.
- "What Goes On Here?", Author & Journalist, Oct–Nov–Dec 1967/Jan–Feb 1968. Explanation for upcoming four skipped months. However, the magazine returned in January.
