= Floyd-Jones =

Floyd-Jones is a surname. Notable people with the name include:

- David R. Floyd-Jones (1813–1871), American lawyer and politician
- DeLancey Floyd-Jones (1826–1902), American brevet brigadier general in the U.S. Civil War
- Edward Floyd-Jones (1823–1901), American politician
- Elbert Floyd-Jones (1817–1901), American politician
- Henry Floyd-Jones (1792–1862), American politician, father of DeLancey Floyd-Jones and uncle of David Floyd-Jones

== See also ==
- Floyd (surname)
- Jones (surname)
