= Ridge-and-Valley Appalachians =

Physiographic province of the larger Appalachian division

Appalachian zones in the United States, spanning from New England in the north through the Mid-Atlantic, and ending in the South, from a United States Geological Survey map

The Ridge-and-Valley Appalachians, also called the Ridge and Valley Province or the Valley and Ridge Appalachians, are a physiographic province of the larger Appalachian Highlands division. The physiographic province is divided into three sections: the Hudson Valley, the Central, and the Tennessee.

The river valleys were areas of indigenous settlements for thousands of years. In the historic period, the Cherokee people had towns along many of the rivers in western South Carolina and North Carolina, as well as on the western side of the Appalachian Mountains in present-day Tennessee. Similarly, the Catawba people occupied areas along the upper Catawba River in Western North Carolina, to the east of Cherokee County.

The ridge and valley system presents an important obstacle to east–west land travel even with today's technology. It was a nearly insurmountable barrier to European-American migrants who walked or rode horses traveling west to settle the Ohio Country, and later the Northwest Territory and Oregon Country. In the era when animal power dominated transportation, there was no safe way to cross east–west in the middle of the range; crossing was only possible nearer its extremes except for a few rough passages opened mid-range during the colonial era, including Cumberland Gap, Braddock's Road, and Forbes Road.

These were later improved as America's first National Roads, including Wilderness Road, Cumberland Road, Lincoln Highway, designated as U.S. Route 40 and U.S. Route 30 in later years. Early settlers of Ohio Country tended to enter it via the Ohio River; river systems were the most important transportation corridors. It was difficult in the late 19th and 20th centuries to construct railroads and modern highways through this area.

== Geography ==
The eastern head of the Ridge and Valley region is marked by the Great Appalachian Valley, which lies just west of the Blue Ridge. The western side of the Ridge and Valley region is marked by steep escarpments such as the Allegheny Front, the Cumberland Mountains, and Walden Ridge. The Valley and Ridge is located on the west side of the Blue Ridge Mountains.

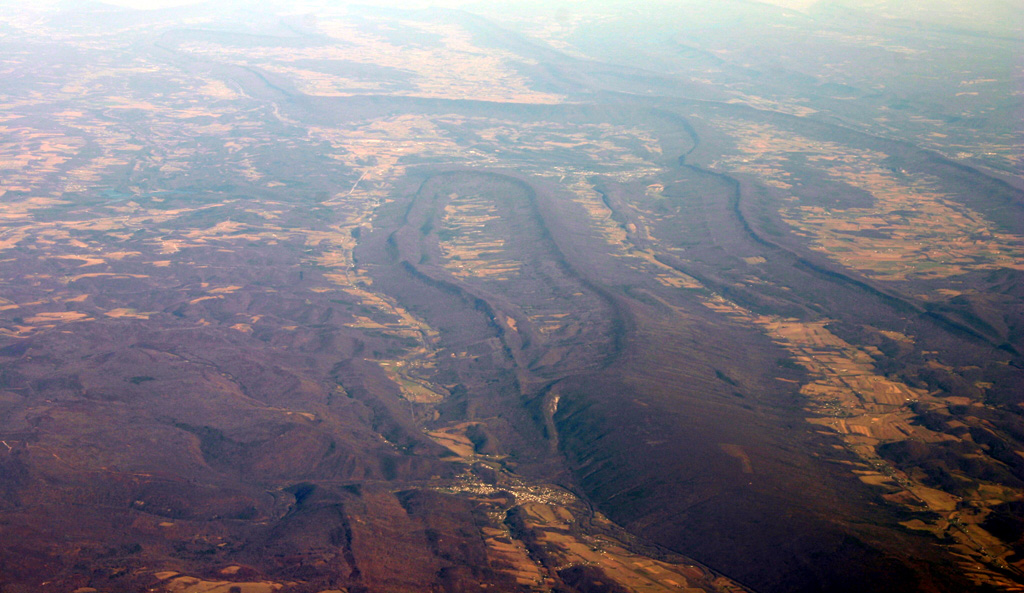
An aerial view of Bedford County, Pennsylvania, showing (from center to right): Wills, Evitts, and Tussey Mountains in December 2006

The Province extends from southeastern New York in the north through northwestern New Jersey, westward into Pennsylvania through the Lehigh Valley, and southward into Maryland, West Virginia, Virginia, Kentucky, Tennessee, Georgia, and Alabama. They form a broad arc between the Blue Ridge Mountains and the Appalachian Plateau physiographic province, which includes the Allegheny and Cumberland plateaus. They are characterized by long, even ridges, with long, continuous valleys in between.

== Significant ridges (from north to south) ==
Name	State
Shawangunk Ridge	New York
Kittatinny Mountain	New Jersey
Bald Eagle Mountain	Pennsylvania
Blue Mountain	Pennsylvania
South Mountain	Pennsylvania
Jacks Mountain	Pennsylvania
Moosic Mountains	Pennsylvania
Nittany Mountain	Pennsylvania
Tuscarora Mountain	Pennsylvania
Tussey Mountain	Pennsylvania
Wills Mountain	Pennsylvania and Maryland
Dans Mountain	Maryland
Sideling Hill	West Virginia, Maryland, and Pennsylvania
Cacapon Mountain	West Virginia
Knobly Mountain	West Virginia
Mill Creek Mountain	West Virginia
New Creek Mountain	West Virginia
North Fork Mountain	West Virginia
Patterson Creek Mountain	West Virginia
Sleepy Creek Mountain	West Virginia
South Branch Mountain	West Virginia
Spruce Mountain	West Virginia
Allegheny Mountain	Virginia and West Virginia
Great North Mountain	Virginia and West Virginia
North Mountain	Virginia and West Virginia
Shenandoah Mountain	Virginia and West Virginia
Massanutten Mountain	Virginia
McAfee Knob	Virginia
Pine Mountain	Kentucky, Virginia, and Tennessee
Clinch Mountain	Tennessee and Virginia
Powell Mountain	Tennessee and Virginia
Bays Mountain	Tennessee
House Mountain	Tennessee
Sharp's Ridge	Tennessee
Taylor Ridge (Georgia)	Georgia
Johns Mountain	Georgia
Lavender Mountain	Georgia
White Oak Mountain	Tennessee and Georgia
Missionary Ridge	Tennessee and Georgia
Stringer's Ridge	Tennessee
Cheaha Mountain	Alabama
Red Mountain	Alabama

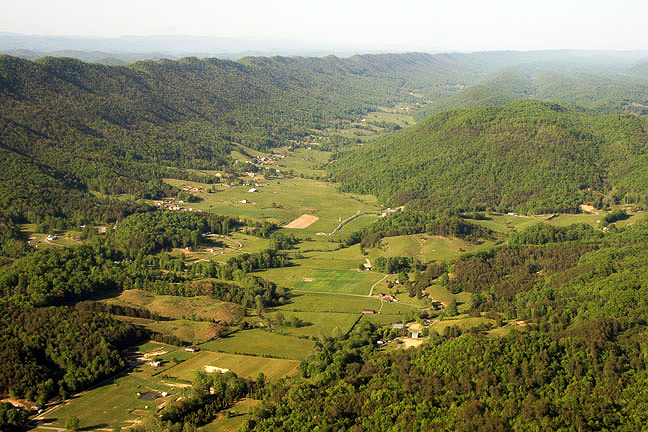
Ridges and valleys near Norton, Virginia in Wise County, Virginia

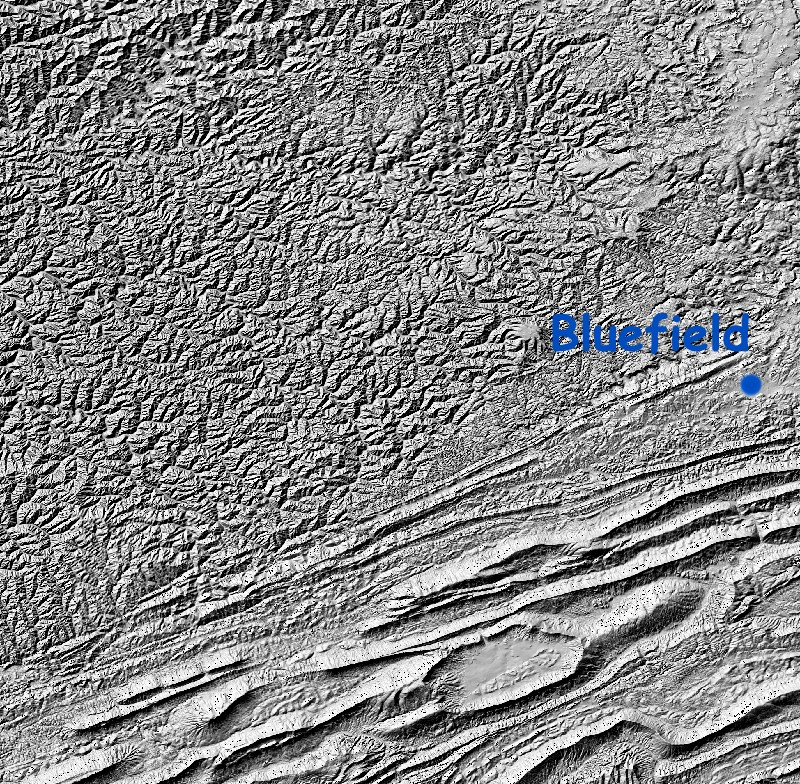
A map of the Cumberland Plateau and Ridge and Valley Appalachians on the border between Virginia and West Virginia

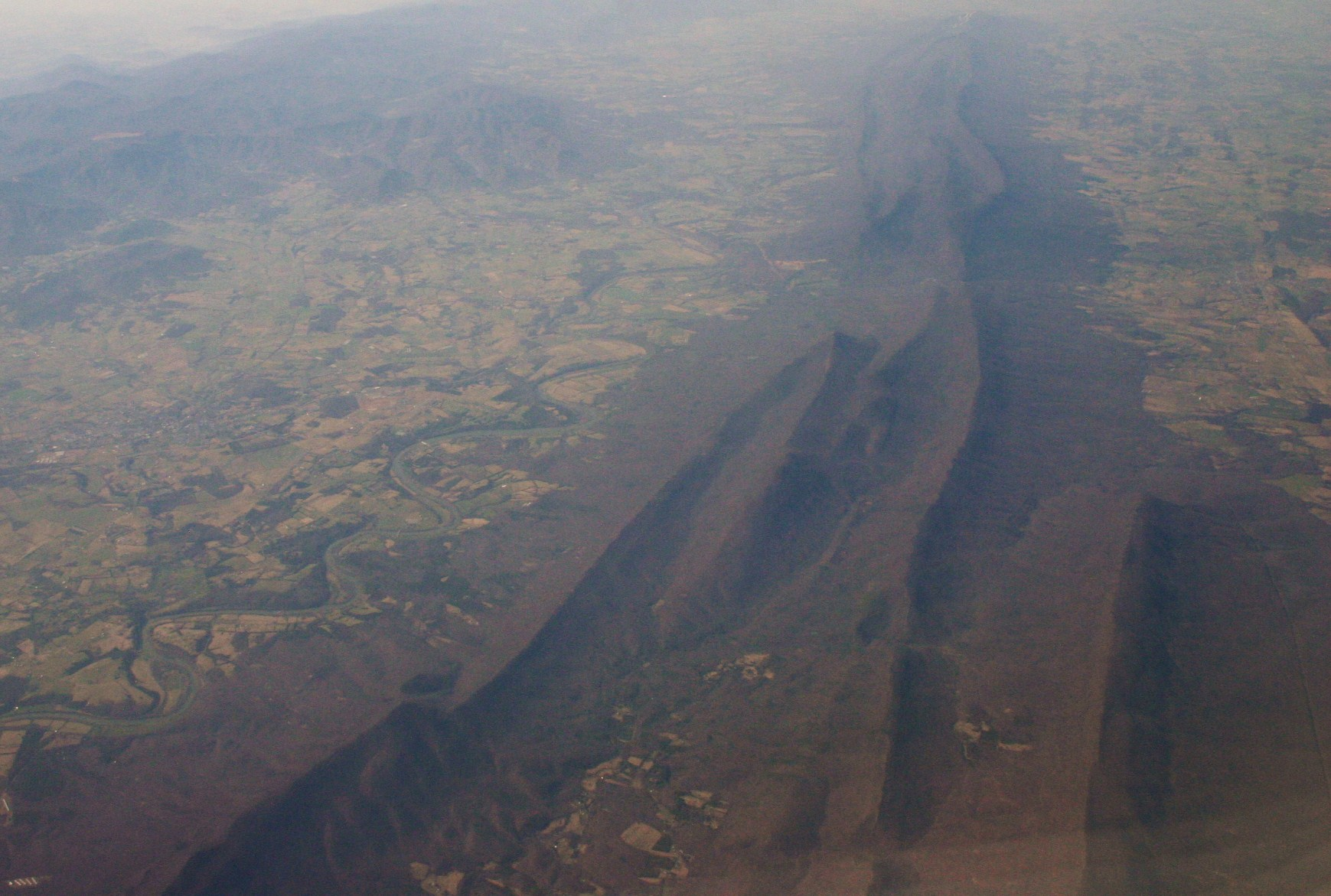
An aerial view Massanutten Mountain, including the south fork of the Shenandoah River (on left) and part of the Blue Ridge Mountains in Virginia

== Geology ==
The Valley and Ridge Province was formed during the Alleghanian orogeny, a mountain-building event that occurred between 325 and 260 million years ago. The rocks in the region were subjected to immense pressure and heat, causing them to deform and fold. The softer parts of these rock units (chiefly shale and limestone) were eroded to form the valleys and the harder parts of the folds (quartzites) formed the mountain tops and ridges. The ridges represent the edges of the erosion-resistant strata, and the valleys portray the absence of the more erodible strata. Smaller streams have developed their valleys following the lines of the more easily eroded strata.

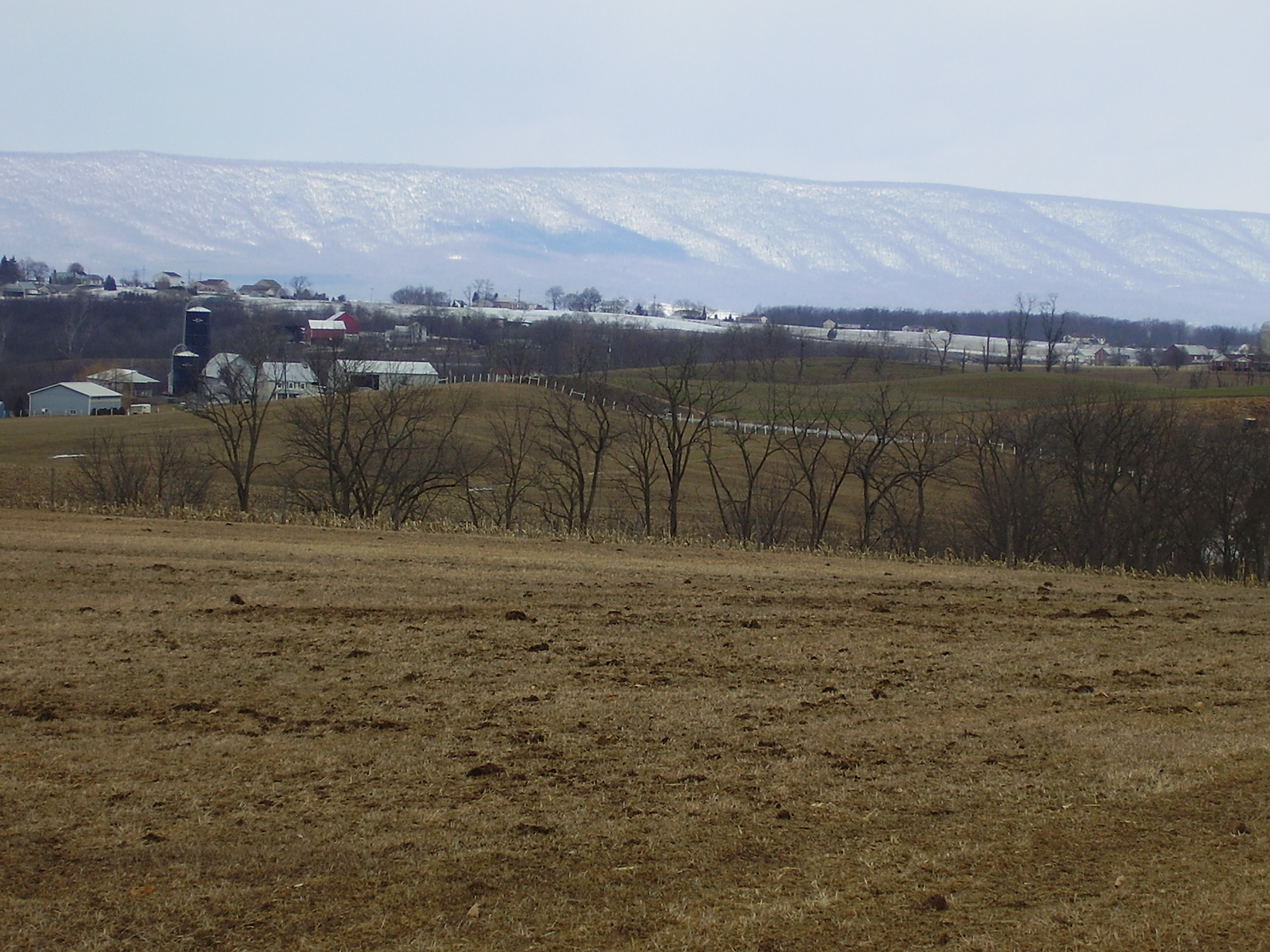
Blue Mountain in the Lehigh Valley region of Pennsylvania

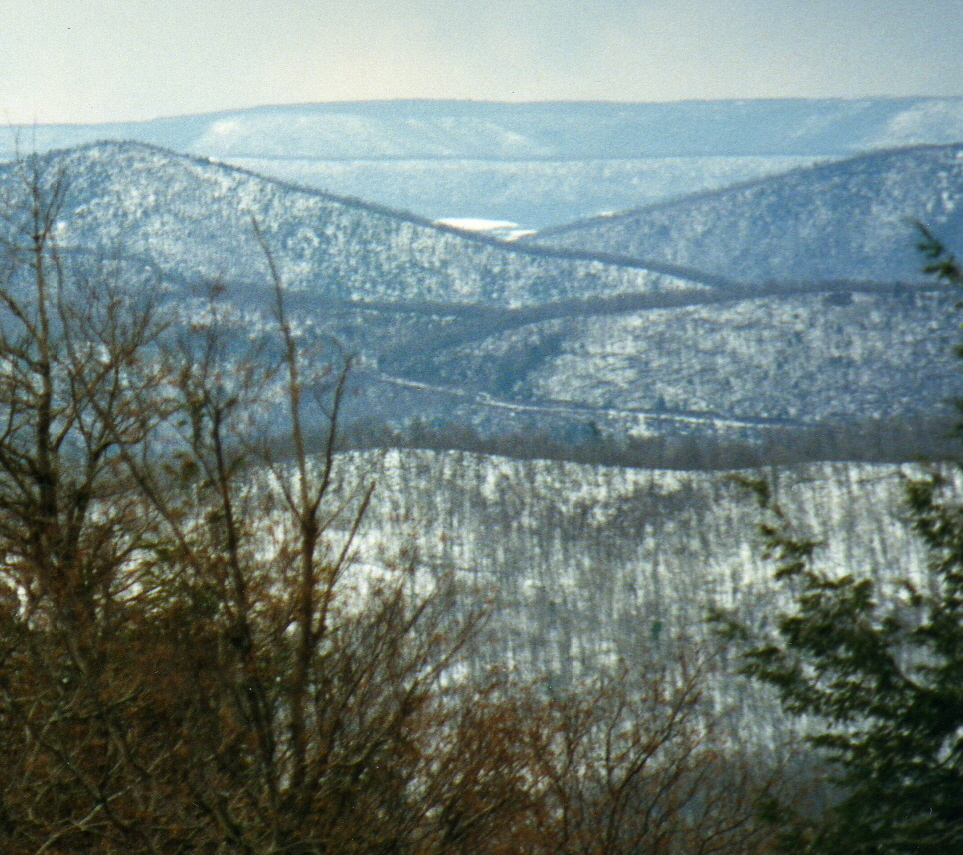
Pennsylvania's ridge country seen from Clarks Knob in Franklin County, Pennsylvania

A few major rivers, including the Delaware River, the Susquehanna River, the New River, and the Potomac River, are older than the present mountains, having cut water gaps that are perpendicular to hard strata ridges. The evidence points to a wearing down of the entire region to a low level with little relief, so that major rivers were flowing in unconsolidated sediments unaffected by the underlying rock structure. The region was then uplifted slowly enough so that the rivers could maintain their course, cutting through the ridges as they developed.

Valleys in the region are either synclinal or anticlinal.

These mountains are at their development in central Pennsylvania, a phenomenon termed the Pennsylvania climax.

== See also ==
- Allegheny Front
- Eastern Continental Divide
- Geology of the Appalachians
- Tennessee Valley Divide
- Tennessee Frontiers: Three Regions in Transition by John R. Finger
