= James H. Floyd State Park =

State park in Summerville, Georgia, USA

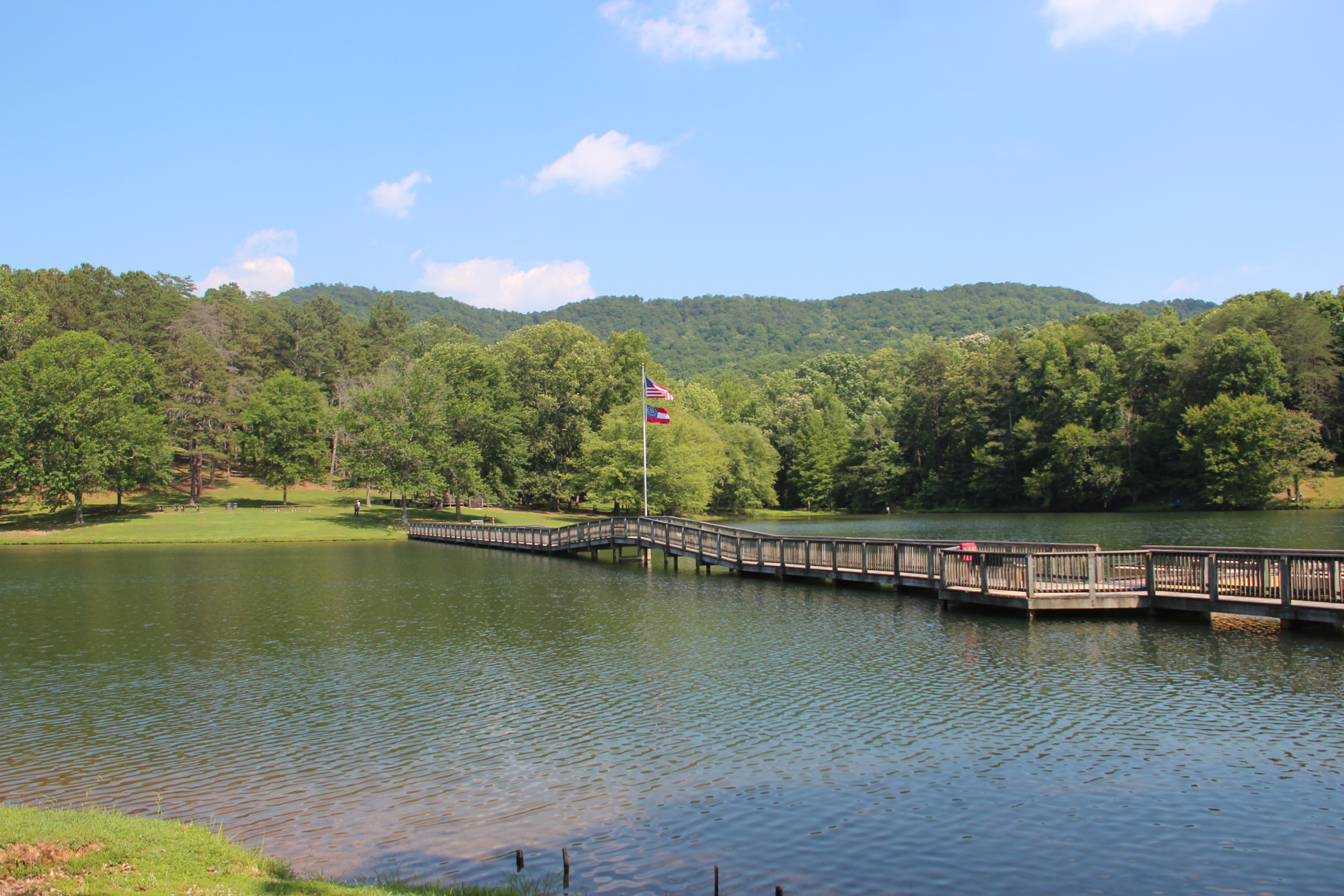
- View of Upper Lake in James H. Floyd State Park

- Location within Georgia Location within the United States
- Location: Chattooga County, Georgia, USA
- Nearest city: Summerville, Georgia
- Coordinates: 34°26′14″N 85°20′22″W
- Area: 561 acres (227 ha)
- Governing body: Georgia State Park

James H. Floyd State Park is a 561-acre (2.27 km^{2}) Georgia State Park located near Summerville at the base of Taylor Ridge (Georgia). The park is named after Democrat James H. "Sloppy" Floyd who served in the Georgia House of Representatives from 1953 until 1974 and was from the area. Surrounded by rural countryside and the Chattahoochee National Forest, the park offers many activities, including camping, hiking and fishing. In addition, the park contains two lakes that total 51 acres (0.21 km^{2}) and a children’s playground. The Pinhoti Trail is accessible through the park.

== Facilities ==
- 25 Tent/Trailer/RV Sites
- 4 Cottages (Log Cabins)
- 2 Playgrounds
- 1 Pioneer Campground
- 4 Picnic Shelters
- 4 Backcountry Campsites (coming soon)

== Annual events ==
- Lucky Cover Cruise In & BBQ (March)
- Twisted Ankle Marathon (May)
- Outdoor Adventure Day (September)
- Taylor Ridge Jamboree (October)
