= Floyd Township =

Floyd Township may refer to:

- Floyd Township, Warren County, Illinois
- Floyd Township, Putnam County, Indiana
- Floyd Township, Floyd County, Iowa
- Floyd Township, Sioux County, Iowa
- Floyd Township, O'Brien County, Iowa
