= John E. Floyd =

Canadian economist

- Born: May 6, 1937 (age 89); Moose Jaw, Saskatchewan
- Education: University of Saskatchewan University of Chicago
- Scientific career
- Fields: Economics
- Workplaces: University of Toronto, University of Washington

John E. Floyd (born May 6, 1937, in Moose Jaw, Saskatchewan) is a Canadian economist and member of the University of Toronto faculty.

== Biography ==
Floyd received his B.Comm. from the University of Saskatchewan in 1958, and continued to obtain an honours economics degree in 1959. He later obtained M.A. and Ph.D. from the University of Chicago in 1962 and 1964 respectively.

Before coming to the University of Toronto in 1970, Floyd spent 9 years at the University of Washington. He joined the Washington faculty as an assistant professor in 1962, and was promoted to associate professor in 1966 and full professor in 1970.

Since 1970, Floyd has been a professor in the Department of Economics at the University of Toronto.

== Major publications ==
- "The Overvaluation of the Dollar: A Note on the International Price Mechanism," American Economic Review, March 1965.
- "The Effects of Farm Price Supports on the Returns to Land and Labor in Agriculture," Journal of Political Economy, April 1965.
- "Economic Growth, Price Trends, and the U.S. Balance of Trade: 1925-62", Journal of Political Economy, November/December 1968, (with J. Allan Hynes).
- "International Capital Movements and Monetary Equilibrium," American Economic Review, September 1969.
- "Monetary and Fiscal Policy in a World of Capital Mobility," The Review of Economic Studies, October 1969.
- "The Contribution of Real Money Balances to the Level of Wealth," The Journal of Money Credit and Banking, May 1972, (with J. Allan Hynes).
- "Deficit Finance and 'First Round' Crowding Out: A Clarification," Canadian Journal of Economics, February 1978 (with J. Allan Hynes).
- "The Asset Theory of the Exchange Rate: A Comment," Scandinavian Journal of Economics, 1978.
- "The Structure of Production, the Composition of Final Demand and the Determination of the Price Level and Employment," Journal of Money, Credit and Banking, May 1978, (with J. Allan Hynes).
- "Capital Immobility, Adjustment Costs, and the Theoretical Foundations of Income-Expenditure Models," Journal of Political Economy, December 1978, (with J. Allan Hynes).
- "Government Expenditure Policies in a Small Open Economy," Canadian Journal of Economics, August 1979.
- "Debt Illusion and Imperfect Information," European Economic Review, 1979, (with J. Allan Hynes).
- "Tax Policy in an Open Economy: A Monetary Approach to a Keynesian Problem," Scandinavian Journal of Economics, 1980.
- Microsets, W.W. Norton, 1981, (with Patrick O'Donoghue, Tanya Roberts, and Mary Eysenbach).
- World Monetary Equilibrium: International Monetary Theory in an Historical-Institutional Context, Philip Allen & University of Pennsylvania Press, 1985.
- On the Dollar, The Fraser Institute, Vancouver, 1985.
- "Balance of Payments Adjustment under the International Gold Standard," Explorations in Economic History, 1991, (with Trevor J. O. Dick).
- Canada and the Gold Standard, 1871–1914, Cambridge University Press, 1992, (with Trevor J. O. Dick).
- "Canada and the Gold Standard, 1871–1914: A Durable Monetary Regime," in Michael Bordo and Forrest Capie, eds. Monetary Regimes in Transition, Cambridge University Press, 1993, (with Trevor J. O. Dick).
- "Are Canadian Interest Rates Too High?" Canadian Public Policy, June 1995.
- "Balance of Payments Adjustment Under Gold Standard Policies: Canada and Australia Compared," in Tamim Bayoumi, Barry Eichengreen and Mark Taylor, eds. Modern Perspectives on the Gold Standard, Cambridge University Press, 1996, (with Trevor J. O. Dick and David Pope).
- "A Portfolio Balance Model of Gold Standard," in B. Eichengreen and M. Flandreau, eds., The Gold Standard in Theory and History, 2nd. ed., New York: Metheun, 1997, pp. 76–98, [Abridged reprint of the paper published in Explorations in Economic History, 28, 1991] (with Trevor J. O. Dick).
- "Real and Monetary Shocks to the Canadian Dollar: Do Canada and the United States Form an Optimal Currency Area?", North American Journal of Economics and Finance, 13, 2002 (with Jack Carr).
