= Taylor Ridge (Georgia) =

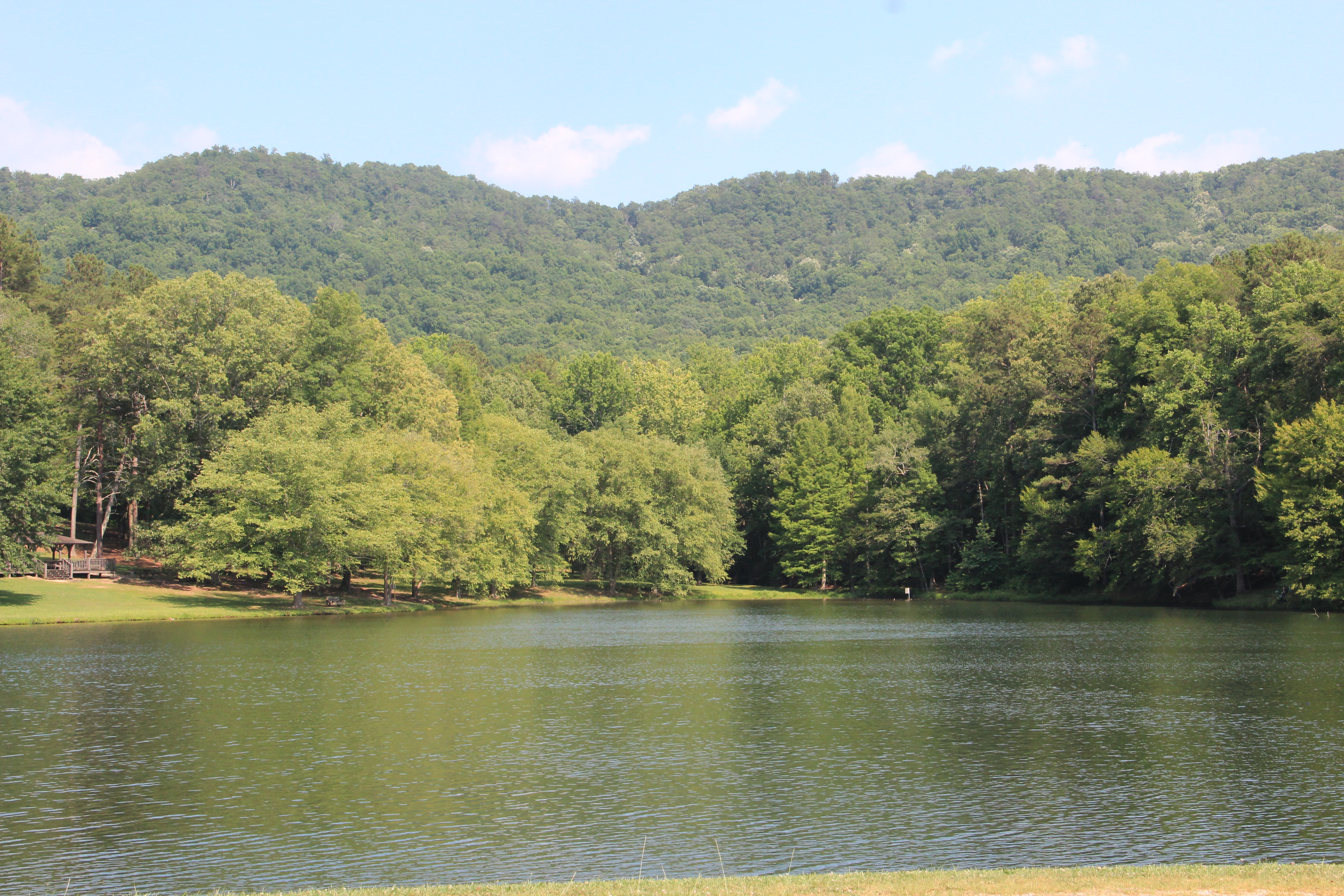
- Taylor Ridge viewed from James H. Floyd State Park

Highest point
- Elevation: 1,665 ft (507 m)
- Prominence: 585 ft (178 m)
- Coordinates: 34°26′49″N 85°18′57″W

Geography
- Location: Summerville, Georgia, U.S.
- Parent range: Ridge and Valley

Taylor Ridge is the most northwestern ridge in the state of Georgia within the Ridge and Valley physiographic region and is approximately 40 miles (64 km) in length. To the west the ridge is bordered by the Cumberland Plateau region and to the north Taylor Ridge becomes White Oak Mountain at Ringgold Gap although technically part of the same ridge. The western foothills of Taylor Ridge are also the western border of the Chattahoochee National Forest. Taylor Ridge is part of the Armuchee Ridges which also consist of Little Sand Mountain, Dicks Ridge, Johns Ridge, Horn Mountain and Rocky Face. Taylor Ridge runs south to north through Chattooga, Walker, Whitfield, and Catoosa counties along the towns of Summerville, Trion, LaFayette and Ringgold. The highpoint of the ridge is 1,665 feet (507 m) where the ridge buckles with Dicks Ridge. An area labeled high point is 1,432 feet (436 m) at the ridges southern terminus along GA highway 100.

Taylor Ridge is often mistakenly referred to as "Taylor's Ridge", however this has grown to be accepted in local contexts, including in official news.

== History ==
The ridge was named in honor of Richard Taylor, a Cherokee Indian chieftain.

A Civil War skirmish occurred at Taylor Ridge on November 7, 1863.

== Hiking and Recreation ==
There are several hiking opportunities along the ridge mostly accessible via the Pinhoti Trail. The Taylor Ridge Trail is a brief view of the ridge available from GA 136 directly west of Villanow, Georgia. The most historical view of the ridge may be within James H. Floyd State Park to the Marble Mine.

== Geology ==
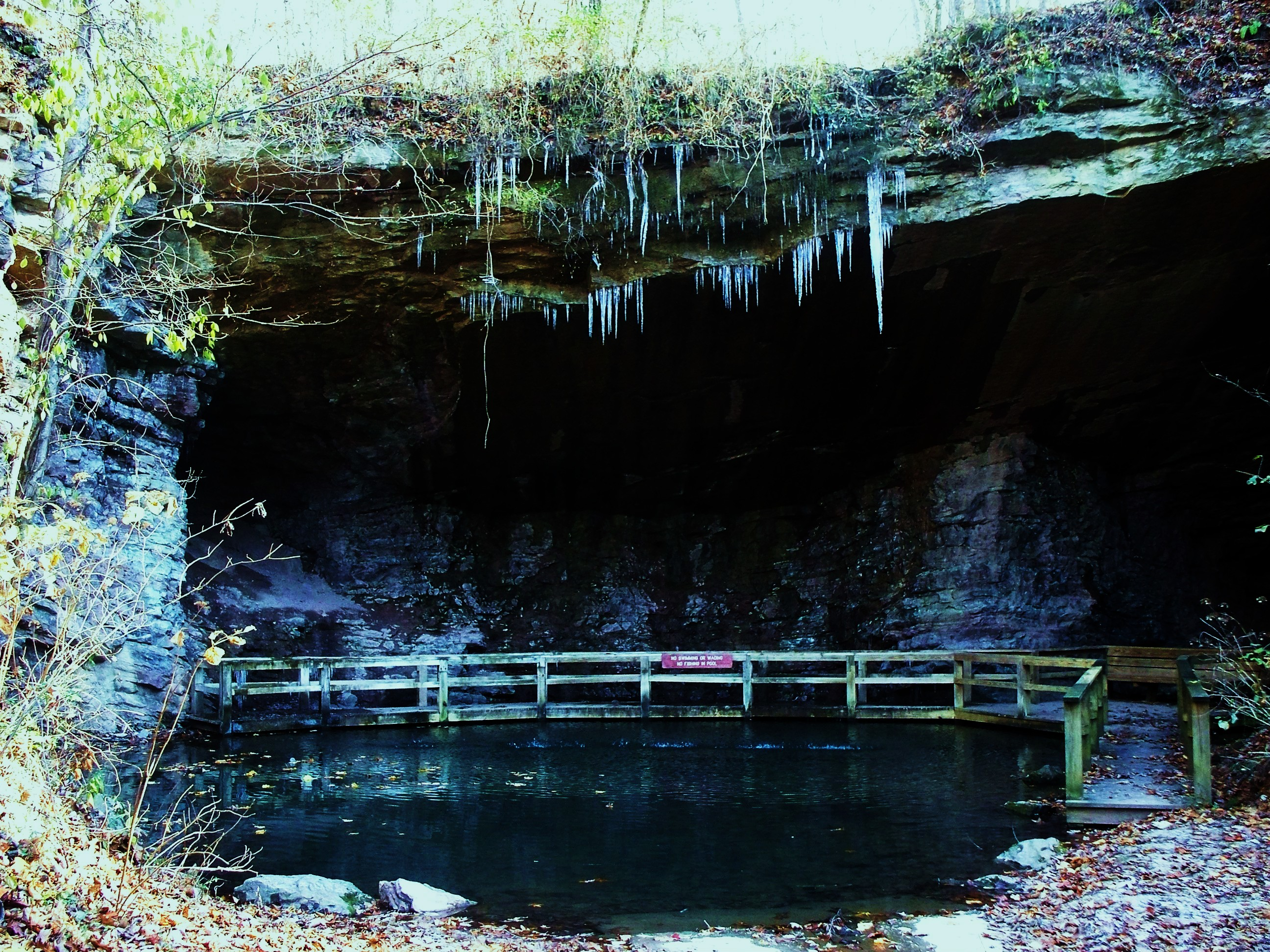
Marble Mine

The ridge and valley area is unique in the fact that either sides of the ridge vary greatly. On Taylor Ridge the western face is sandstone, while the east facing cliffs are hard chert, a noncrystalline quartz. Because of this difference in soils types and sunlight either side of the ridge boast a diversity in flora and fauna as well. Other aragonites may be found along this portion.
