= Self-Master Colony =

New Jersey homeless experiment

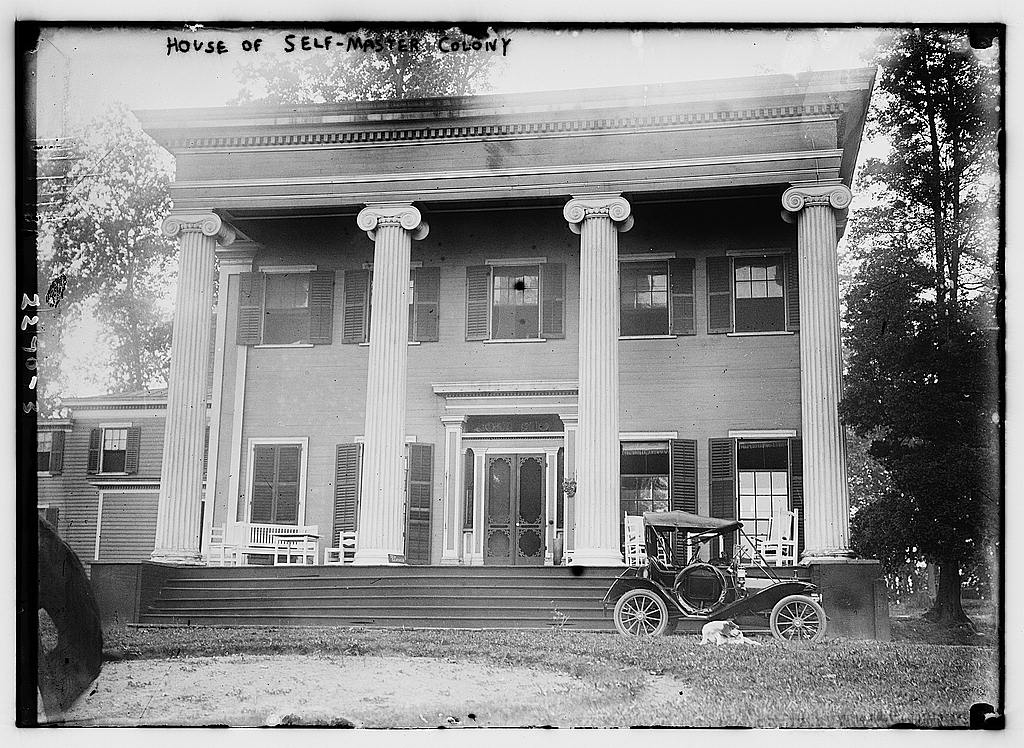
Self-Master Colony c. 1913

The Self-Master Colony (1908–1938) was an experiment in housing the homeless in Union Township, Union County, New Jersey. A lengthy article about it was published in the December 9, 1911, issue of Literary Digest magazine.

== History ==
The colony was built on the Hoyt family mansion in Union Township, Union County, New Jersey, in 1908. The colony was founded by Andress Small Floyd and his wife Lillian.
