= Andress Small Floyd =

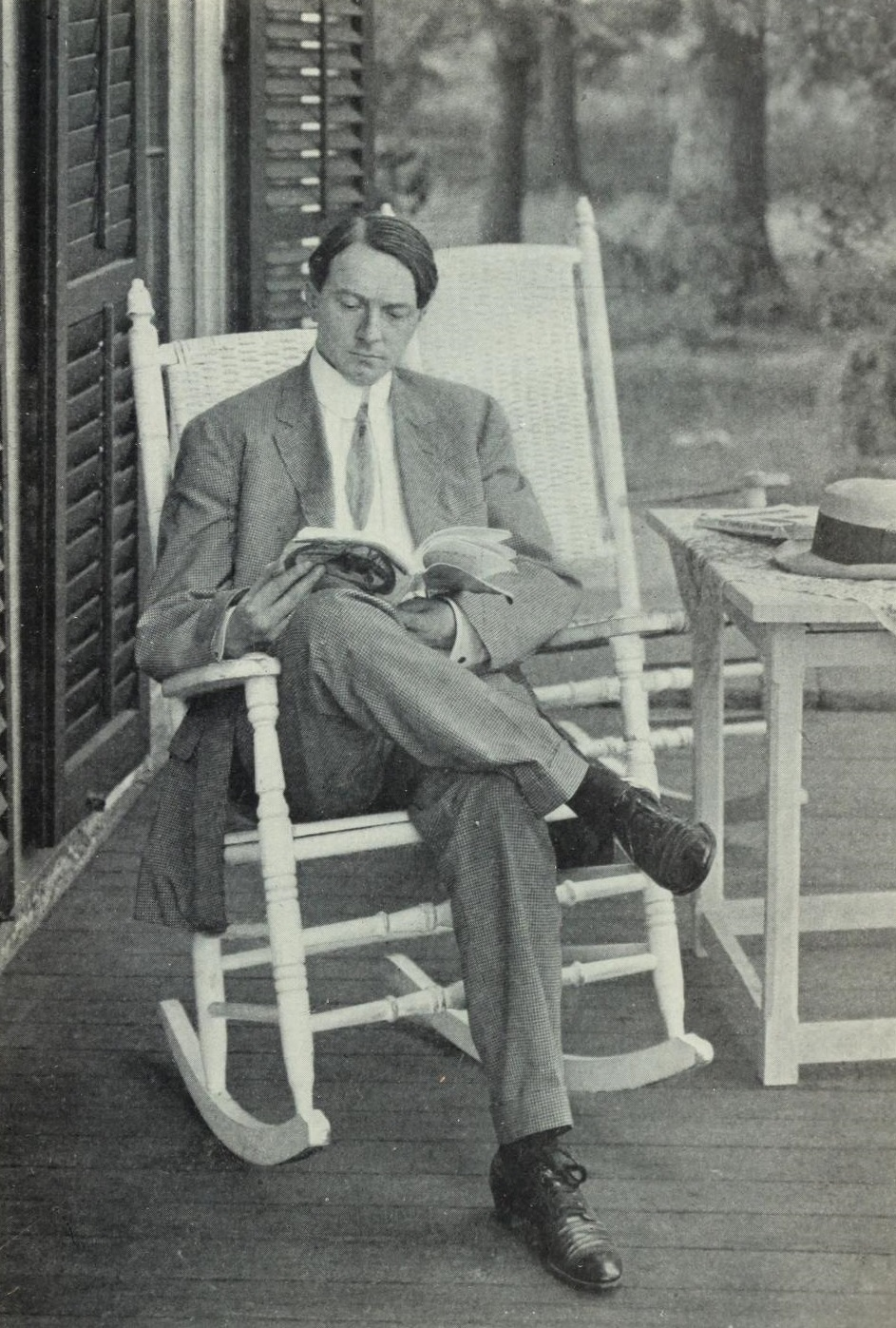
Andress Small Floyd.

Andress Small Floyd (June 7, 1873 - January 10, 1933), was a philanthropist, who founded the Self-Master Colony.

== Biography ==
He was born on June 7, 1873, in Saco, Maine, to Ephriam Hicks Floyd and Olive Small. In 1899 he married Alice D. Hart. He died on January 10, 1933, in Union, New Jersey.
