= Floyd Wagstaff =

American football and basketball coach (1911–2000)

Biographical details
- Born: January 8, 1911; Shelby County, Texas, U.S.
- Died: February 5, 2000 (aged 89); Tyler, Texas, U.S.

Playing career

Football
- 1935–1936: Stephen F. Austin

Coaching career (HC unless noted)

Football
- 1937–1941: Kilgore HS (TX) (assistant)
- 1942–1944: Kilgore HS (TX)
- 1945: Tyler HS (TX) (assistant)
- 1947–1962: Tyler

Basketball
- 1937–1938: Kilgore JHS (TX)
- 1941–?: Kilgore HS (TX)
- 1945–1946: Tyler HS (TX)
- 1946–1975: Tyler

Baseball
- 1946: Tyler HS (TX)

Administrative career (AD unless noted)
- 1941–?: Kilgore HS (TX)
- 1963–1984: Tyler

Head coaching record
- Overall: 130–36 (junior college football); 743–225 (junior college basketball); 17–10–1 (high school football)
- Bowls: 3–3 (junior college)

Accomplishments and honors

Championships
- Football; 2 SJCC (1947, 1949); 4 Big Six JC (1950–1953); 3 TEC (1958, 1960–1961) Basketball; 2 NJCAA Division I (1949, 1951)

Floyd Solomon Wagstaff (January 8, 1911 – February 5, 2000) was an American football and basketball coach and athletics administrator. He coached Tyler Junior College in Tyler, Texas from 1946 to 1975 and served as athletic director until retiring in 1984. He led the Apaches to national basketball championships in 1949 and 1951, and a record 11 NJCAA national tournament appearances. Wagstaff compiled 743–225 record as Tyler's basketball coach.

Wagstaff went to Kilgore, Texas in 1937 as coach of the junior high school. He became an assistant coach at Kilgore High School the following year. In January 1941, Wagstaff was appointed head basketball coach and athletic director at Kilgore High School. He was the head football coach at Kilgore High School from 1942 to 1944. Wagstaff resigned from his post at Kilgore High School in 1945 to become head basketball coach and assistant football coach at Tyler High School. He was also the head baseball coach at Tyler High School in the spring of 1946 before leaving to become head basketball coach at Tyler Junior College that fall. Wagstaff was the first head football coach at Tyler Junior College, serving from 1947 to 1962. He was promoted to athletic director in 1963 and succeeded as head football coach by Babe Hallmark.

Wagstaff died on February 5, 2000, at a hospital in Tyler. He is a member of the Texas Sports Hall of Fame and the Stephen F. Austin University Hall of Fame.

== Head coaching record ==
=== Junior college football ===
Year	Team	Overall	Conference	Standing	Bowl/playoffs
Tyler Apaches (Southwestern Junior College Conference) (1947–1949)
1947	Tyler	10–1	7–0	1st	L Texas Rose Bowl
1948	Tyler	7–3	5–2	T–2nd	
1949	Tyler	11–1	6–1	T–1st	W Texas Rose Bowl
Tyler Apaches (Big Six Junior College Conference) (1950–1953)
1950	Tyler	9–2	4–1	1st	W Texas Rose Bowl
1951	Tyler	10–1	3–0	1st	L Junior Rose Bowl
1952	Tyler	9–2	4–0	1st	
1953	Tyler	10–1	2–0	1st	
Tyler Apaches (Longhorn Conference) (1954–1956)
1954	Tyler	6–3–2	1–2–1	3rd	
1955	Tyler	5–4–1	1–3	4th	
1956	Tyler		0–3–1	5th	
Tyler Apaches (Independent) (1957)
1957	Tyler	8–2			W Hospitality Bowl
Tyler Apaches (Texas Eastern Conference) (1958–1962)
1958	Tyler	9–2	2–1	T–1st	L NJCAA championship game
1959	Tyler	4–4–1	0–3	4th	
1960	Tyler	12–1	8–0	1st	L Junior Rose Bowl
1961	Tyler	8–1	7–1	1st	
1962	Tyler	6–5	3–3	2nd	
Tyler:			53–20–2		
Total:					
National championship Conference title Conference division title or championship game berth
