= Charles Floyd =

Charles Floyd may refer to:

- Charles Floyd (explorer) (1782–1804), with Lewis and Clark Expedition
- Charles A. Floyd (1791–1873), U.S. Representative from New York
- Charles M. Floyd (1861–1923), American merchant, manufacturer, and politician
- Charles Murray Floyd (1905–1971), English businessman, surveyor, and politician
- Charles R. Floyd (1881–1945), Texas State Senator, 1917–1929, State Representative, 1945
- Charles Rinaldo Floyd (1797–1845), American military leader
- Pretty Boy Floyd (1904–1934), American bank robber and alleged killer

== See also ==
- Charles Floyd Hatcher (born 1939), American politician and lawyer
