= Lloyd (name) =

Given name or surname

Lloyd is a surname originating with the Welsh adjective llwyd, most often understood as meaning 'grey' but with other meanings as well. The name can be used both as a given name and as a surname. The name has many variations and a few derivations, mainly as a result of the difficulty in representing the initial double-L for non-Welsh speakers and the translation of the Welsh diphthong wy. Lloyd is the most common form of the name encountered in the modern era, with the Welsh spelling Llwyd increasingly common in recent times.

The vast majority of Wales continued to use the patronymic system well into the early modern period, and the families that used family surnames passed on from one generation to the next remained exceptional. However, the name Lloyd/Llwyd and certain other Welsh adjectives such as goch ('red', evolving into the Welsh surname Gough) became "fixed epithets" passed on through the generations and functioned as family surnames as early as the 14th century.

== Meanings ==
The name Lloyd/Llwyd originates with the Welsh adjective llwyd, usually understood to mean 'grey' and which can be distinguished as a "fixed epithet" passed on from one generation to the next, as early as the 14th century. However, the word llwyd also has other meanings, especially if buttressed with other nouns or adjectives, such as penllwyd ('grey-headed') and llwydwyn ('grey-white'). In addition to "grey" as most commonly understood, llwyd also includes shades of brown, according to T.J. Morgan and Prys Morgan.

Lloyd as a boy's name is pronounced /lɔɪd/. It is of Welsh origin, and the meaning of Lloyd is 'grey', from Llwyd. The name may originally allude to experience and wisdom, and probably denoted a person entitled to respect.

... dŵr llwyd refers to the brown waters of a river in flood, papur llwyd refers to the old-fashioned wrapping paper or "brown paper". It is very likely that when used of younger men llwyd referred to the mouse-coloured hair. But llwyd could of course be used to also refer to the grey hair of old age, and was occasionally found in compounds with gwyn (white).

— Welsh Surnames

By the time that the adjective llwyd became a fixed epithet and then a family name, llwyd had more or less lost its original meaning of "grey". T. J. and Prys Morgan note:

... in general it is likely the adjective llwyd referred to some sort of brown hair when associated with a personal name. HBr 495 is wrong in stating "the third son was called David Llwyd, I presume, from his grey hair in early life". By the time the pedigree in question had evolved, the adjective had long ceased to have the literal meaning "grey".

— Welsh Surnames

As an adjective, llwyd also held the meaning or connotation of 'holy' during the medieval period, affecting characteristic adjective lenition. A medieval Welsh scribe or a scribe familiar with the Welsh language would understand that the usage of the mutated form of llwyd, and lwyd was employed to convey the sense of "holiness". Therefore, as a surname Llwyd/Lloyd "retains the radical consonant after the persona name, masc. and fem alike". The Anglo-Norman scribe would not be familiar enough with medieval Welsh orthography to know that ll was used for the voiceless alveolar lateral fricative and generally used l for the initial ll and its lenited version, single l except that occasionally attempts were made to show that the sound was l with a difference.

The use of 'L' and a knowledge that adjectives generally lenited when fixed after a persons name, have together misled textual editors into the belief that llwyd or loyd (of the English or Norman scribe) stands for the lenited form so that they have printed Lwyd in their modernized versions, ie. failing to realize that llwyd is one of the exceptions.

— Welsh Surnames

== Variations ==
Variations most often encountered illustrate the degree to which Anglo-Norman and later English scribes sought to render the sounds unfamiliar to their own diction. The voiceless "unilateral hiss" was often rendered as thl or ffl, or left with a single l. Another challenge was with the Welsh diphthong wy ([ʊi] or [ʊɨ] approximately as in the word "gooey" pronounced as one syllable) which was rendered by the closest English approximation oy.

Most modern variations of Lloyd/Llwyd originate in the Tudor period, and are largely "corruptions" of llwyd. Variations include: Floyd, Flewett, Flewitt, Flood, Floed, Floyde, Flowitt, Flude, Fludd, Fludde, Flude, Fluett, Fluat, Flyd, Flyde, Lide, Lhuyd, Loud, Loulld, Luyd, Llowyde, Llowyd, Lloyed, Lloilld, Llwyed, Thoyd, Thloyd, and Thllewyd.

Lloyd has become the most common form of the name in all parts of Wales today, and with the double-L pronounced as a single-L (without the voiceless, "unilateral hiss"), and the use of a single-L in the spelling is rare. The "more correct" spelling (or the spelling more closely matching the Welsh llwyd) Llwyd had long ceased to be used as a version of the name until fairly recently, "as Lloyd has been deliberately changed to Llwyd in a number of cases in our own time".

== See also ==
- List of people with given name Lloyd
- List of people with surname Lloyd
