= Floyd Orson Wolfenbarger =

American architect (1904–1979)

- Born: November 19, 1904; Winkler, Riley County, Kansas, U.S.
- Died: July 18, 1979 (aged 74); Topeka, Kansas, U.S.
- Other name: Floyd O. Wolfenbarger
- Education: Kansas State Agricultural College
- Occupation: Architect

Floyd Orson Wolfenbarger (1904–1979), was an American architect in Kansas. He founded the architectural firm F. O. Wolfenbarger and Associates in 1935, and was part of the architectural firm partnership, Wolfenbarger and McCulley. Wolfenbarger designed several Kansas State University buildings in Manhattan, Kansas.

== Biography ==
Floyd Orson Wolfenbarger was born on November 29, 1904, in Winkler, an unincorporated community in Riley County, Kansas. He graduated from Manhattan High School.

He graduated from Kansas State Agricultural College (now Kansas State University) in Manhattan, Kansas in 1927. He received a Bemis Foundation grant for work at Massachusetts Institute of Technology (MIT), to develop modular units as building materials.

He lived in Boston, Massachusetts for 8 years, working at the architecture firm Bigelow, Wadsworth, Hubbard and Smith. In 1934 or 1935, he returned to Manhattan, Kansas to open his own architectural firm F. O. Wolfenbarger and Associates, where he designed hospitals, jails, recreational facilities, businesses and homes. He also worked for the Riley County Better Housing Committee. In 1956, he served on the design team for the Dwight D. Eisenhower Presidential Library in Abilene, Kansas. Wolfenbarger served as president of the Kansas chapter of the American Institute of Architects (AIA) in 1949.

He established an architectural firm Wolfenbarger and McCulley in the city of Manhattan, Kansas, a partnership with architect Robert Maxwell McCulley, who continued the firm until 1985, after Wolfenbarger's death.

He died on July 18, 1979, in Topeka, Kansas, after a stay in a hospital. The Kansas Historical Society has a collection of the firm's records.

== Work ==
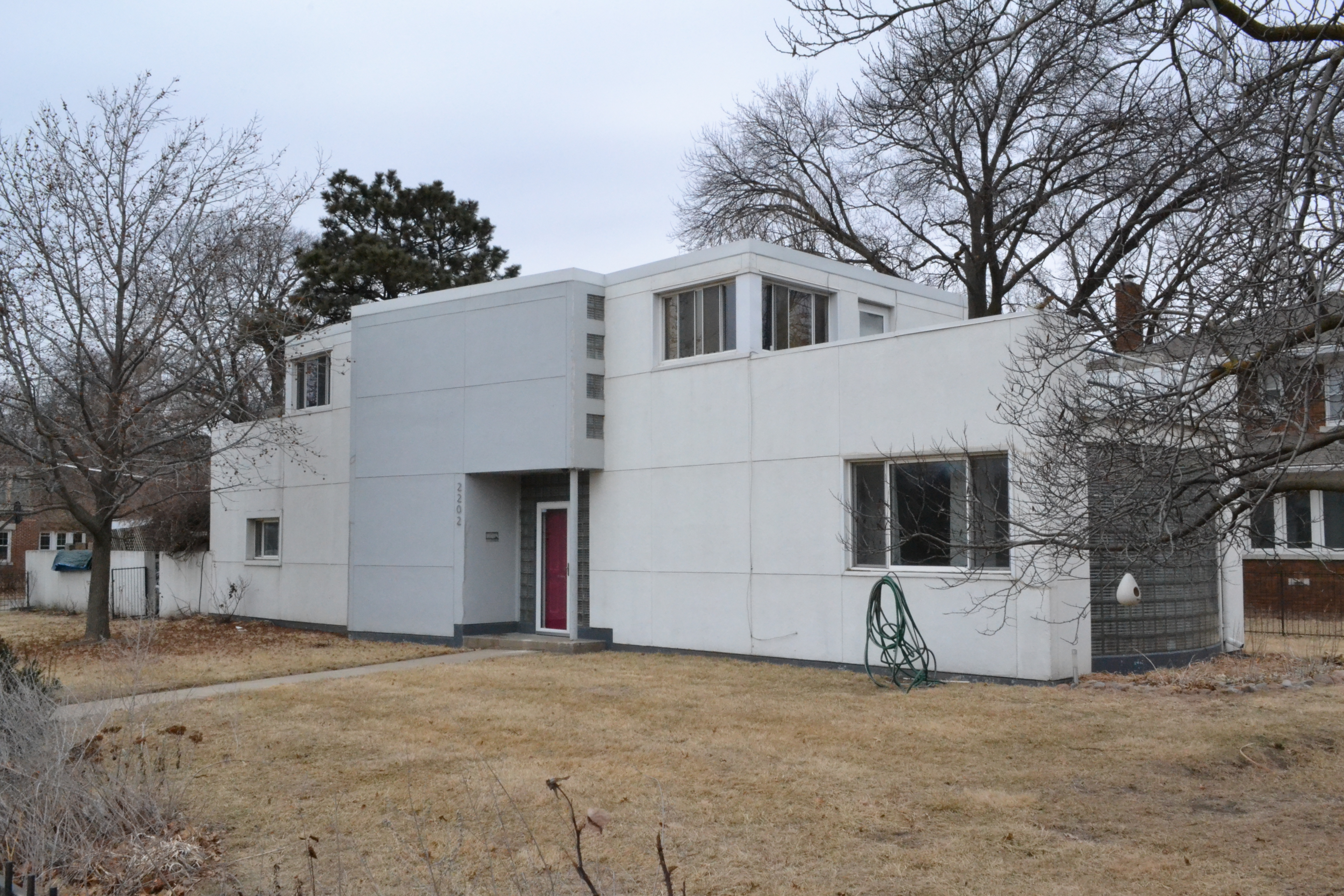
Nelson Antrim Crawford House (1938), Topeka, Kansas

- Mattie M. Elliot House (c. 1927, or 1928), at 600 Houston Street, Manhattan, Riley County, Kansas; NRHP-listed
- Nelson Antrim Crawford House (1938), at 2202 SW Seventeenth Street, Topeka, Shawnee County, Kansas; NRHP-listed
- Riley County Jail (1940), at Colorado and 6th Streets, Manhattan, Kansas
- Riley County Memorial Hospital (1954), at Manhattan, Kansas
- Eisenhower Presidential Library (1956) in Abilene, Kansas; one of the project architects
- Kansas State University, several buildings including McCain Auditorium (1969), King Hall (1966), Caldwell Hall (1963), and Justin Hall (1960)
- Manhattan Country Club, at Manhattan, Kansas
- AT&T building at 1640 Fairchild Avenue, Manhattan, Kansas
- Arthur-Green office building at 801 Poyntz Avenue, Manhattan, Kansas
- Riley County Historical Museum at 2309 Claflin Road, Manhattan, Kansas
- Lee Elementary at 701 Lee Street, Manhattan, Kansas

== See also ==
- National Register of Historic Places listings in Riley County, Kansas
