= Bobby Floyd =

Bobby Floyd may refer to:

- Bobby Floyd (baseball) (born 1943), American baseball coach and former MLB player
- Bobby Floyd (musician) (born 1954), American pianist, organist, keyboardist, bandleader, and composer
- Bobby Jack Floyd (1929–2012), American fullback in the NFL for the Green Bay Packers and Chicago Bears
