= James H. Floyd =

American politician (1920–1974)

James H. "Sloppy" Floyd (1920 – December 20, 1974) was an American politician. A Democrat, he was a Georgia State Representative from 1953 to 1974.

== Early life ==
Floyd attended Middle Georgia Junior College before enlisting in the United States Army Air Forces and serving in the Pacific Theatre during World War II.

== Political career ==
Floyd served in the Georgia State House from 1953 until his death in 1974. He served as chairman of the Georgia House Appropriations Committee.

James H. Floyd State Park is named for him.

The James H. "Sloppy" Floyd Veterans Memorial Building, a state of Georgia government office building in downtown Atlanta, is named for him.

=== Bond v. Floyd ===
Floyd was involved in the 1966 U.S. Supreme Court case Bond v. Floyd regarding the State House's refusal to seat Civil rights movement leader Julian Bond, one of 11 Black candidates to win House seats after the Voting Rights Act of 1965 forced redistricting, because of comments that Bond had made regarding the Vietnam War. Bond won the case and was required to be seated in the House.
