= Floyd County =

Floyd County is the name of six counties in the United States:

- Floyd County, Georgia, the most populous county with this name
- Floyd County, Indiana, the first county founded with this name and a suburban district of the Louisville metropolitan area
- Floyd County, Iowa
- Floyd County, Kentucky
- Floyd County, Texas
- Floyd County, Virginia
