= List of people with surname Lloyd =

This is a list of people with the surname Lloyd.

== A ==
- A. L. Lloyd (1908–1982), English folk singer and collector of folk songs
- Alex Lloyd (born 1974), Australian singer-songwriter
- Alex Lloyd (born 1984), IndyCar race driver
- Alice Spencer Geddes Lloyd (1876–1962), American social reformer
- Andrew Lloyd Webber, Baron Lloyd-Webber (born 1948), English composer of musical theatre
- Anthony Lloyd (born 1984), English footballer
- Arthur Lloyd, several people

== B ==
- Benjamin Lloyd (1839–after 1865), Coal Heaver in the Union Navy during the American Civil War
- Bertram Lloyd (1881–1944), English naturalist, humanitarian, vegetarian and campaigner for animal rights
- Bill Lloyd, American soccer coach
- Blake Lloyd, Canadian engineer
- Bobby Lloyd (c. 1888–1930), Welsh international rugby union player

== C ==
- Cariad Lloyd (born 1982), British actress and comedian
- Carli Lloyd (born 1982), American soccer player
- Carli Lloyd (volleyball) (born 1989), American volleyball player
- Charles W. Lloyd (1915–1999), educationalist and headmaster of Dulwich College
- Cher Lloyd (born 1993), English singer
- Christopher Lloyd (born 1938), American character actor
- Christopher Lloyd (born 1960), American TV writer and producer
- Clive Lloyd (born 1944), West Indian cricketer
- Colin Lloyd (born 1973], English darts player
- Connie Lloyd (1895–1982), artist from New Zealand who specialised in etching
- Constance Lloyd (1859–1898), English author

== D ==
- Daniel Lloyd (born 1980), English professional road racing cyclist
- Daniel Lloyd (born 1982), bilingual Welsh actor and singer-songwriter
- Daniel Lloyd (born 1992), British racing car driver
- Daniel B. Lloyd, retired United States Coast Guard Rear Admiral
- Danielle Lloyd (born 1983), British glamour model
- Danny Lloyd (born 1973), American child actor
- David Lloyd (born 1948), former professional tennis player and founder of the David Lloyd Tennis Clubs
- David Lloyd George, 1st Earl Lloyd George of Dwyfor (1863–1945), British politician and prime minister
- Dennis Lloyd (born 1993), Israeli singer and music producer
- Dennis Lloyd, Baron Lloyd of Hampstead (1915–1992), British jurist and peer
- Dudley Lloyd-Evans (1895–1972), Welsh-born soldier, airman and flying ace

== E ==
- Edward Lloyd
  - Edward Lloyd (c. 1648–1713), first proprietor of Lloyd's Coffee House in London
  - Edward Lloyd (1670–1718), British colonial governor of Maryland
  - Edward Lloyd (1744–1796), Maryland delegate to the Continental Congress
  - Edward Lloyd (1779–1834), governor of The U.S. state of Maryland
- Edward Lhuyd (1660–1709), Welsh naturalist, botanist, linguist, geographer and antiquary
- Elizabeth Jane Lloyd (1928–1995), British artist
- Ella Lloyd (born 2005), Welsh racing driver
- Emily Lloyd
  - Emily Ann Lloyd, (born 1984), American actress
  - Emily Lloyd (born 1970), English actress
  - Emily Lloyd (chemist) (1860–1912), English chemist
  - Emily Lloyd (curler), (born 1996), Canadian curler
  - Emily Lloyd-Saini, British comedian, writer and actress
- Ernest Marsh Lloyd (1840–1922), British soldier and historian
- Errol Lloyd (born 1943), Jamaican-born artist, writer and art critic
- Etta Belle Lloyd (1860–1929), American civic leader

== F ==
- Frank Lloyd (1886–1960), English/American film director and producer
- Frank Lloyd (born 1952), British horn player and teacher
- Frank Lloyd III (1929–1995), Australian actor
- Frank Lloyd Wright (1867–1959), American architect

== G ==
- Gareth David-Lloyd (born 1981), Welsh actor
- Gaylord Lloyd (1888–1943), American actor
- Genevieve Lloyd (born 1941), Australian philosopher and feminist
- Geoff Lloyd, (born 1973), British radio DJ
- Geoffrey Lloyd, Baron Geoffrey-Lloyd (1902–1984), British Conservative Party politician
- George Lloyd (disambiguation), multiple people
- Georgia Lloyd (1913–1999), American pacifist, writer
- Gordon W. Lloyd (1832–1905), English/American architect
- Gweneth Lloyd (1901–1993), cofounder of Royal Winnipeg Ballet
- Gwilym Lloyd George (1894–1967), British politician

== H ==
- Harold Lloyd (1893–1971), American actor and filmmaker known for his silent film comedies
- Henry Lloyd (1852–1920), governor of Maryland
- Henry Lloyd (1911–2001), Anglican priest
- Henry Lloyd (c. 1718–1783), Welsh army officer and military writer
- Henry Demarest Lloyd (1847–1903), American journalist
- Henry J. Lloyd (1794–1853), English amateur cricketer
- Hiram Lloyd (1863–1942), lieutenant governor of the U.S. state of Missouri
- H. S. Lloyd (1887–1963), British dog breeder

== J ==
- Jake Lloyd (born 1989), American actor
- James Lloyd (disambiguation), multiple people
- Jeremy Lloyd (1930–2014), British actor and songwriter
- Jess Lloyd (born 1995), British swimmer
- Jessica Raine (born 1982), real name Jessica Lloyd, English actress
- Jim Lloyd (born 1954), Australian politician
- John Lloyd (born 1954), British tennis player
- John Lloyd (born 1943), former head coach to Wales national rugby union team
- John M. Lloyd (1835–1892), American police officer, testified in the Abraham Lincoln assassination conspiracy trials
- Jordan Loyd (born 1993), American basketball player in the Israeli Basketball Premier League
- Josie Lloyd (1940–2020), American actress
- Julian Lloyd Webber (born 1951), composer, cellist & brother of Andrew Lloyd Webber

== K ==
- Kanoa Lloyd (born 1986), television and radio presenter from New Zealand
- Keith Warren Lloyd (born 1967), American author and historian
- Kyle Lloyd (born 1990), American baseball player

== L ==
- Larry Lloyd (born 1948), English footballer
- Lewis Lloyd (1959–2019), American basketball player
- Llewellyn Lloyd (1877–1958), Welsh international rugby union player
- Lucy Lloyd (1834–1914) creator along with Wilhelm Bleek of the 19th century archive of ǀXam and !kun texts

== M ==
- Marie Lloyd (1870–1922), music hall singer
- Marilyn Lloyd (1929–2018), American politician
- Marion Lloyd (1906–1969), American foil fencer
- MarShawn Lloyd (born 2001), American football player
- Mary Helen Wingate Lloyd (1868–1934), American horticulturist
- Matthew Lloyd (born 1978), Australian rules footballer and Coleman Medallist

== N ==
- Nicholas Lloyd (born 1942), British journalist
- Norman Lloyd (disambiguation), multiple people

== P ==
- Patrick Lloyd (2004- until), High school shot put and discus thrower.
- Peggy Lloyd (1913–2011), American stage actress
- Percy Lloyd (1871–1959), Wales national rugby player
- Peter Lloyd (born 1966), Australian journalist

== R ==
- Rachel Lloyd (1839–1900), American chemist
- Raymond Lloyd (born 1964), American professional wrestler better known as Glacier
- Richard Lloyd (disambiguation), multiple people
- Richard Hey Lloyd (1933–2021), British organist and composer
- Ridgway Robert Syers Christian Codner Lloyd (1842–1884), English physician and antiquary
- Robert Lloyd (disambiguation), multiple people

== S ==
- Sabrina Lloyd (born 1970), American actor
- Sam Lloyd (1963–2020), American character actor and nephew of Christopher Lloyd
- Sampson Lloyd (1699–1779), English iron manufacturer and co-founder Lloyds Bank
- Samuel Loyd (1841–1911), American puzzle author and recreational mathematician
- Sarah J. Lloyd (1896–19??), Welsh artist
- Selwyn Lloyd, Baron Selwyn-Lloyd (1904–1978) British politician and general
- Seth Lloyd (born 1960), American professor of mechanical engineering at MIT
- Seton Lloyd (1902–1996), British archaeologist
- Sian Lloyd (born 1972), Welsh television news presenter
- Siân Lloyd (born 1958), Welsh weather presenter
- Steffan Lloyd (born 1998), Welsh cyclist
- Suzanne Lloyd (born 1932), Canadian actress

== T ==
- Terry Lloyd (1952–2003), British television journalist killed in Iraq
- Thomas Lloyd (1756–1827), stenographer, known as the "father of American shorthand"
- Tommy Lloyd (born 1974), American basketball coach
- Tony Lloyd (disambiguation), multiple people

== V ==
- Vanessa Lloyd-Davies (1960–2005), British doctor, equestrian and soldier

== W ==
- William Lloyd (disambiguation), multiple people
