= William Lloyd =

William Lloyd may refer to:

== Military ==
- William Lloyd (Royal Navy officer) (1725–1796), Admiral of the White
- William Lloyd (British Army officer) (1778–1815), British soldier of the Napoleonic Wars, wounded at the Battle of Waterloo
- William Alvin Lloyd (1822–1868), steamboat and railroad guide publisher, was employed during the Civil War as a personal spy for President Abraham Lincoln
- William R. Lloyd (1916–1942), American naval officer

== Politics ==
- William F. Lloyd (1864–1937), newspaper editor and Prime Minister of Newfoundland
- William Henry Lloyd (1932–1992), Baltimore attorney, candidate for the U.S House of Representatives
- William P. Lloyd (1837–1911), American politician from Pennsylvania
- William R. Lloyd Jr. (born 1947), Pennsylvania politician
- William Lloyd (councillor) (born 1988), Brentwood First councillor
- J. William Lloyd (1857–1940), American individualist anarchist
- William Bross Lloyd (1875–1946), American attorney and political activist
- William Field Lloyd (1873–1965), member of the Queensland Legislative Assembly

== Religion ==
- William Lloyd (bishop of Worcester) (1627–1717), bishop of St Asaph, of Lichfield and Coventry and of Worcester
- William Lloyd (bishop of Norwich) (1637–1710), bishop of Llandaff, Peterborough and Norwich
- William Lloyd (bishop of Killala and Achonry) (died 1716), Irish Anglican priest
- William Lloyd (Methodist minister) (1771–1841), Welsh Anglican priest who became a Methodist preacher
- William Lloyd (archdeacon of Durban) (1802–1881), archdeacon of Durban

== Sportspeople ==
- William Lloyd (rugby league) (1934–2011), Australian rugby league player
- William Lloyd (rugby union) (born 1990), New Zealand rugby union player
- Bill Lloyd (basketball) (William John Lloyd, 1915–1972), American basketball player
- Bill Lloyd (footballer) (William George Lloyd, 1896–1950), Australian rules footballer
- Bill Lloyd (tennis) (William Lloyd, born 1949), Australian tennis player

== Other ==
- Sir William Lloyd (mountaineer) (1782–1857), soldier and mountaineer
- William Forster Lloyd (1794–1852), British economist
- William Watkiss Lloyd (1813–1893), writer
- William Lloyd (engineer) (1822–1905), British civil engineer
- William Alford Lloyd (1826–1880), English zoologist and aquarist
- William Patrick Lloyd, sideman for the music band Placebo

== See also ==
- Bill Lloyd (disambiguation)
