= Bill Lloyd =

Bill Lloyd may refer to:

== Sportspeople ==
- Bill Lloyd (basketball) (1915–1972), American professional basketball player
- Bill Lloyd (footballer) (1896–1950), Australian rules footballer
- Bill Lloyd (racing driver) (1923–2011), American amateur racing driver
- Bill Lloyd (soccer), American men's national team soccer coach
- Bill Lloyd (tennis) (born 1949), Australian tennis player

== Musicians ==
- Bill Lloyd (rock musician), member of the alternative rock band Placebo
- Bill Lloyd (country musician), former member of Foster & Lloyd and the Sky Kings

== See also ==
- William Lloyd (disambiguation)
