= Arthur Lloyd =

Arthur Lloyd may refer to:

- Arthur Lloyd (rugby league), rugby league footballer of the 1930s for Wales, and York
- Arthur Lloyd (musician) (1839–1904), Scottish singer, songwriter, comedian and stage producer
- Arthur Lloyd (bishop) (1844–1907), Anglican bishop
- Arthur Lloyd (missionary) (1852–1911), Anglican missionary to Japan, academic, biographer and translator
- Arthur Selden Lloyd (1857–1936), Episcopal bishop
- Arthur Lloyd (English footballer) (1881–1945), English footballer (Wolverhampton Wanderers, Brighton & Hove Albion)
- Arthur Lloyd (Welsh footballer) (1868–1942), Welsh international footballer
- Art Lloyd (1896–1954), American cameraman
- Arthur Lloyd (historian) (1917–2009), English historian of the New Forest region of Hampshire, England

== See also ==
- Archie Kirkman Loyd (1847–1922), MP for Abingdon
- Arthur Loyd (1882–1944), his nephew, Conservative Party politician in England
