= Admiral Lloyd =

Admiral Lloyd may refer to:

- Daniel B. Lloyd (fl. 1970s–2010s), U.S. Coast Guard rear admiral
- Rodney Lloyd (1841–1911), British Royal Navy admiral
- Ron Lloyd (fl. 1980s–2010s), Royal Canadian Navy vice admiral
