= Daniel Lloyd =

Daniel Lloyd may refer to:

- Daniel Lewis Lloyd (1843–1899), schoolteacher and cleric
- Dan Lloyd (American football) (born 1953), NFL linebacker for the New York Giants
- Daniel B. Lloyd, U.S. Navy admiral
- Danny Lloyd (born 1972), American child actor
- Daniel Lloyd (cyclist) (born 1980), English professional road racing cyclist
- Daniel Lloyd (actor and musician) (born 1982), bilingual Welsh actor and singer-songwriter
- Daniel Lloyd (Nigerian actor), Nigerian actor
- Danny Lloyd (footballer) (born 1991), English professional footballer
- Daniel Lloyd (footballer) (born 1992), Australian rules footballer
- Daniel Lloyd (racing driver) (born 1992), British racing car driver

== See also ==
- Danielle Lloyd (born 1983), English glamour model
