= Senator Lloyd =

Senator Lloyd may refer to:

== Members of the United States Senate ==
- Edward Lloyd V (1779–1834), U.S. Senator from Maryland from 1819 to 1826
- James Lloyd (Maryland politician) (1745–1830), U.S. Senator from Maryland from 1797 to 1800
- James Lloyd (Massachusetts politician) (1769–1831), U.S. Senator from Massachusetts from 1808 to 1813

== United States state senate members ==
- Henry Lloyd (governor) (1852–1920), Maryland State Senate
- James R. Lloyd (1950–1989), Pennsylvania State Senate
- Sherman P. Lloyd (1914–1979), Utah State Senate
- William P. Lloyd (1837–1911), Pennsylvania State Senate

== See also ==
- Jean Hall Lloyd-Jones (born 1929), Iowa State Senate
