= Anthony Lloyd (disambiguation) =

Anthony Lloyd (born 1984) is a British former footballer.

Anthony Lloyd may also refer to:

- Anthony Loyd (born 1966), British journalist

== See also ==
- Tony Lloyd (disambiguation)
