= Trevor Lloyd (artist) =

New Zealand artist, illustrator and cartoonist (1863–1937)

- Born: 21 December 1863; Silverdale, Auckland, New Zealand
- Died: 11 September 1937 (aged 73); Auckland, New Zealand
- Occupations: Artist, illustrator, cartoonist
- Relatives: Constance Alice Lloyd (daughter); Olive Vera Lloyd (daughter)

Trevor Lloyd (21 December 1863 – 11 September 1937) was a New Zealand artist, illustrator and cartoonist.

Lloyd was born in Wade (now called Silverdale), north of Auckland, New Zealand, on 21 December 1863 to Henry and Hannah (née Miles) Lloyd. Lloyd’s work is evocative of the New Zealand bush and his work often contained Maori motifs. Lloyd exhibited with the Auckland Society of Arts in 1883, 1896, 1898, 1899 and 1907 and in 1927 at the New Zealand Academy of Fine Arts. Some examples of his work are available online.

Lloyd was employed as an illustrator for New Zealand Illustrated Magazine from November 1901 until its last edition in 1905 (in which he was acknowledged). He also worked as an illustrator for Auckland Weekly News and as a cartoonist for The New Zealand Herald, retiring in 1936 after 34 years.

Lloyd's mansion, Whare Tane

Lloyd commissioned a mansion in Mount Eden, Auckland, that was built in 1925–26. Known as Whare Tane, the avant-garde residence is registered by Heritage New Zealand as a Category I building.

Both of his daughters, Connie and Olive were artists in their own right.

Lloyd died in Auckland on 11 September 1937, aged 73.

== Art Gallery ==
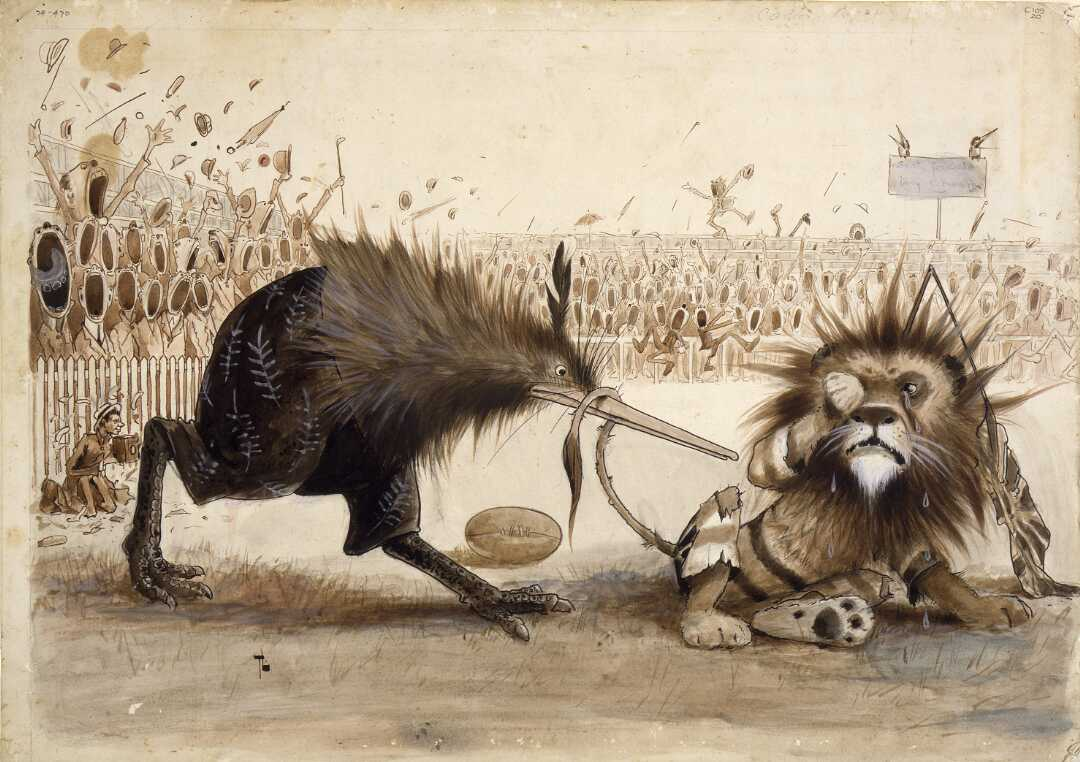
Lions defeated in rugby by the All Blacks. 1908.

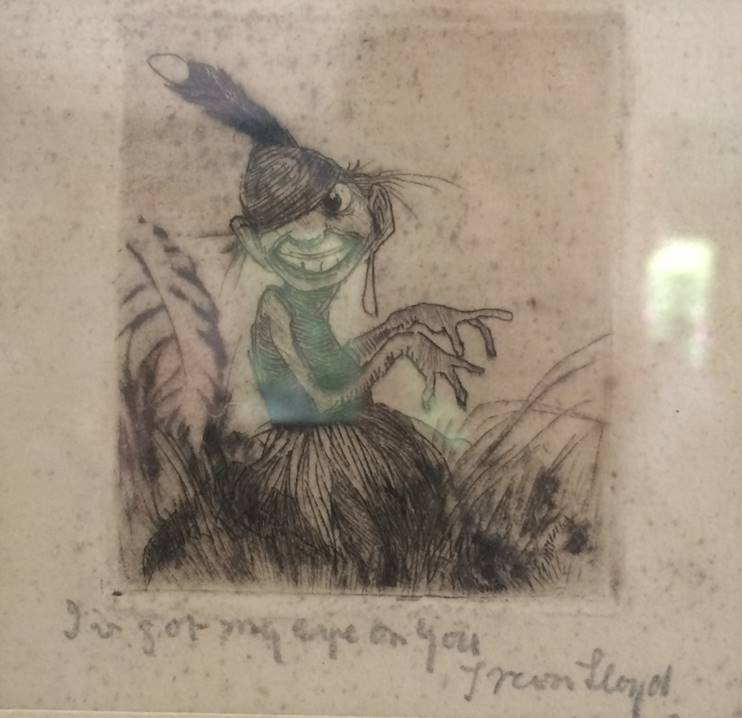
I've got my eye on you.

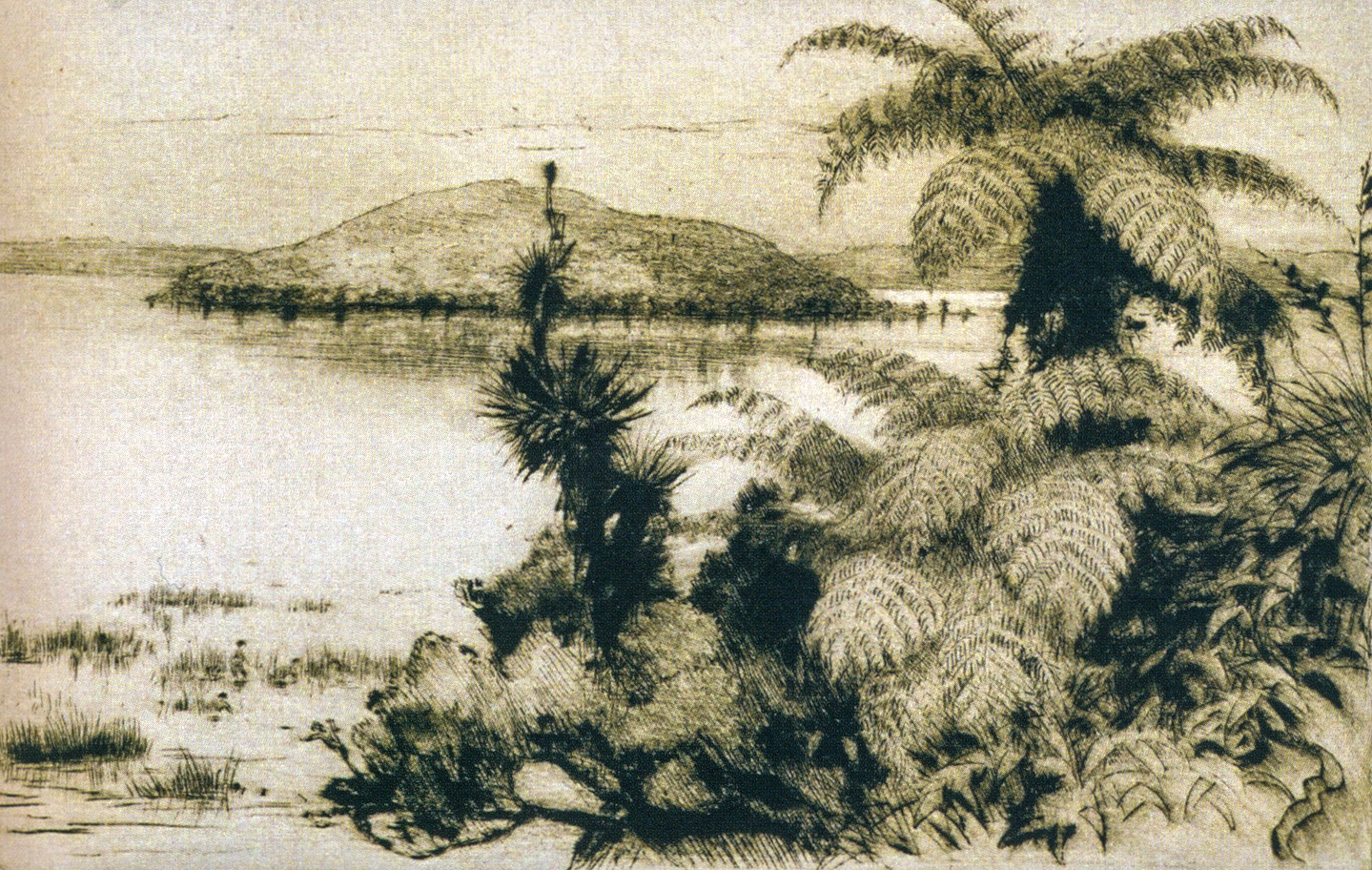
Lake Rotorua.

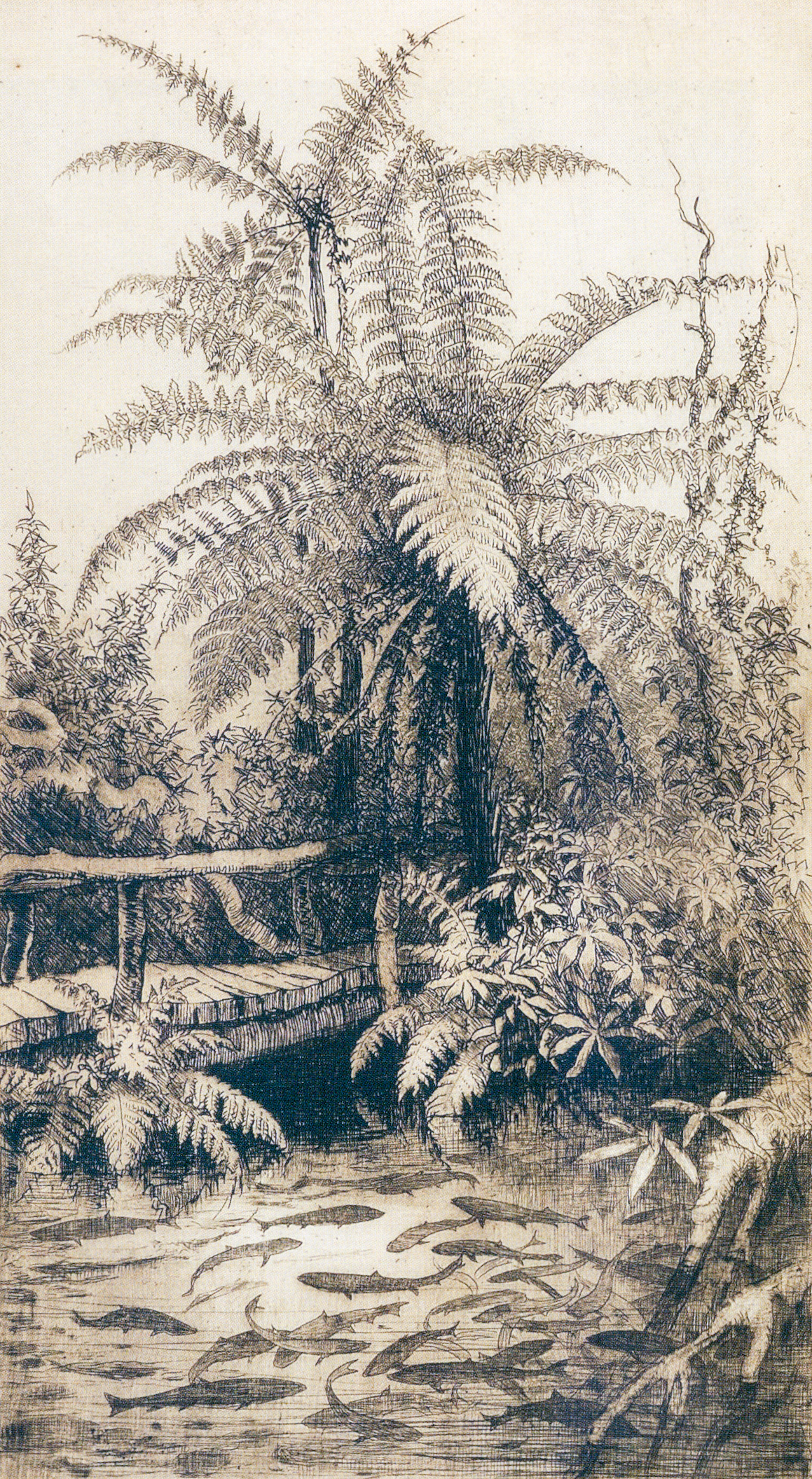
Bridge over Stream.
