= American College of Heraldry and Arms =

Former American heraldry organization

A seal bearing the arms of The American College of Heraldry and Arms.

The American College of Heraldry and Arms, Inc. (Note: This organization is not affiliated with the currently active American College of Heraldry) was an American organization established in 1966 to promote heraldry in the United States. The corporate address of the college was Harbormaster's Building, Herald's Mews on Longneck, Pier 4 Pratt Street, Baltimore, Maryland.

The organization was divided into two administrative divisions: the American College of Arms researched inherited arms, verified genealogy, and granted new arms to individuals across the country; the College of Arms of the United States assisted corporate entities, such as businesses and municipal heraldry.

The college was established by Donald Franklin Stewart, William Henry Lloyd, Charles Francis Stein, Jr., and Gordon Malvern Fair Stick. Their titles were, respectively, Chief Herald Marshall, Herald Genealogist, Herald Chancellor, and Telorum Rex.

The college employed art students from the Maryland Institute College of Art to paint the armorial achievements and create grant and matriculation documents.

On 1 June 1968, the college granted arms to President Lyndon Johnson; the grant was presented to Johnson by Mr. Donald Stewart in the Oval Office of the White House on Monday, June 10, 1968, at 10:00 am, with U.S. Senator Daniel Brewster in attendance. The arms were blazoned Azure on a Saltire Gules fimbriated between four Eagles displayed a Mullet Or.

In October 1968, the college granted a coat of arms to Maryland Governor Spiro Agnew. The blazon of these arms was Azure on a Cross between four Horses Heads couped Argent a Cross botony Gules.

By January 1969 the college had refused over 1000 requests for arms. The petitions were denied because they were assumed arms or armorial petitions with errors in their genealogy. The college also excluded helms or coronets from their armorial grants.

The college existed until 1970.

Lyndon B. Johnson

Spiro Agnew

== Seal ==
The arms incorporated elements from many different European national arms.

Coat of arms of American College of Heraldry and Arms
Escutcheon Quarterly of eight (1) Or a Lion Rampant within a Double Tressure fleury-counter-fleury Gules [Scotland] (2) Azure three Fleur-de-lis Or [France] (3) Gules three Lions passant guardant Or [England] (4) Azure billety a Lion rampant crowned holding a Sword in the dexter paw and a bundle of arrows in the sinister Or [Netherlands] (5) Azure three Crowns Or [Sweden] (6) Or a double headed Eagle Sable [Germany] (7) Azure a Harp Or [Ireland] and (8) Per pale Gules a castle Or and Argent a Lion rampant Purpure [Spain] (9) on an Escutcheon over all Argent six Pallets Gules on a Chief Azure thirteen Mullets Argent [United States].
