= Robert Lloyd =

Robert Lloyd may refer to:

- Robert Lloyd (of Rhiwgoch) (fl. 1574–1630s), member of the English Parliament for Merioneth 1601
- Robert Lloyd (courtier) (fl. 1600–1625), courtier and member of parliament for Ludlow, and for Minehead
- Robert Lloyd (1657–1709), member of the English (later Great Britain) Parliament for Shropshire, 1699–1702, 1705–8
- Robert Lloyd (died 1734), member of the Great Britain Parliament for Shropshire, 1710–3, 1722–7
- Robert Lloyd (poet) (1733–1764), British poet
- Bobby Lloyd (1888–1930), Welsh rugby union and rugby league footballer who played in the 1910s and 1920s
- Robert Lloyd (bass) (born 1940), English opera singer
- Bob Lloyd (cricketer) (born 1947), Australian cricketer
- Bob Lloyd (rugby union) (born 1943), English rugby union footballer who played in the 1960s and 1970s
- Bob Lloyd (basketball) (born 1946), American basketball player
- Robert Lloyd (Nightingales) (born 1959), lead singer of British post-punk band The Nightingales
- Rob Lloyd (property developer) (born 1964), British property developer
- Rob Lloyd (comedian) (born 1978), Australian comedian, actor and television presenter
