= William Henry Lloyd =

American politician and lay historian (1911–1969)

- Lloyd in 1969

Member of the Maryland House of Delegates from Dorchester County
- In office 1939–1943

Personal details
- Born: December 10, 1911 Norristown, Pennsylvania, U.S.
- Died: September 21, 1969 (aged 57) Delaware River, near Philadelphia, U.S.
- Resting place: Old St. David's Church, Radnor Township, Pennsylvania
- Party: Republican
- Education: Friends Select School; Episcopal Academy; Pennsylvania State University
- Occupation: Real estate broker
- Known for: Co-founder of the American College of Heraldry and Arms

Military service
- Allegiance: United States
- Branch/service: United States Army
- Rank: Corporal
- Battles/wars: World War II
- Awards: Bronze Star Medal

William Henry Lloyd (December 10, 1911 – September 21, 1969) was an American politician and real estate broker from Maryland. A Republican, he represented Dorchester County in the Maryland House of Delegates from 1939 to 1943. He ran for the United States House of Representatives from Maryland's 1st congressional district in 1942, 1946 and 1960 and lost each time. Drafted in 1943, he served in the United States Army in World War II and received the Bronze Star Medal for heroism at the Battle of Saint-Lô.

Lloyd belonged to nearly thirty historical and hereditary societies. In 1966 he was one of the four founders of the American College of Heraldry and Arms, and in 1968 he became the first president of the Huguenot Society of Maryland. He was also president of the Society of the War of 1812 in Maryland.

== Early life ==
Lloyd was born in Norristown, Pennsylvania, on December 10, 1911. His father, John Strawbridge Lloyd, was a banker, and his mother was Edith Mercer (Parker) Lloyd. He was the youngest of six children. His father had died by 1920, when his mother was raising the family in Philadelphia. He went to Friends Select School and the Episcopal Academy in Philadelphia and later studied agriculture at Pennsylvania State University. By 1940 Lloyd and his mother were living at a property called Lloyd's, outside Cambridge in Dorchester County, Maryland.

== Business ==
Lloyd worked in real estate and investments. In 1940 he ran his own firm, Wm. H. Lloyd & Co., which had offices in the Emerson Tower Building in Baltimore. When he died he was the head of the Maryland-Virginia Farm Agency.

== Political career ==
Lloyd was elected to the House of Delegates in 1938 and sat in the 1939 and 1941 sessions. He was the only Republican in Dorchester County's three-member delegation. According to his memorial in The Report, he was also the only Republican from the Eastern Shore in the General Assembly during those years.

In the September 1942 primary Lloyd was the only Republican candidate for the 1st district seat in the U.S. House. In November he lost to the Democratic incumbent, David J. Ward. He ran unsuccessfully for the seat again in 1946 and 1960.

== Military service ==
Lloyd was inducted into the United States Army at Baltimore on March 12, 1943, two months after his term in the legislature ended. He reached the rank of corporal in World War II. He was awarded the Bronze Star Medal for heroism at the Battle of Saint-Lô in July 1944 and earned five battle stars.

== Heraldry and historical societies ==
Lloyd, Donald F. Stewart, Charles F. Stein Jr. and Gordon Malvern Fair Stick founded the American College of Heraldry and Arms in Baltimore in 1966. Lloyd's title in the college was Herald Genealogist. The college granted arms to President Lyndon B. Johnson in June 1968 and designed arms for Governor Spiro Agnew that October.

When the Huguenot Society of Maryland was organized at Lloyd's home in Baltimore on March 31, 1968, he was Corresponding Secretary General of the National Huguenot Society. He was the Maryland society's president from its founding until he died. The society called his death "an incalculable loss" and presented a Maryland flag in his memory to the national society.

Lloyd was president of the Society of the War of 1812 in Maryland, a commander in the Military Order of the Loyal Legion of the United States and a member of the Society of the Cincinnati and the Society for the History of the Germans in Maryland. He belonged to nearly thirty historical societies in all.

== Personal life ==
Lloyd married Charlotte (Julier) Bateman of the Homeland section of Baltimore in 1965. She had three sons and two daughters from her earlier marriage.

== Death ==
Lloyd was living in Baltimore in 1969. On September 21 of that year, aged 57, he died of an apparent heart attack on a Delaware River cruise near Philadelphia organized by the Swedish Colonial Society. He is buried at Old St. David's Church in Radnor Township, Pennsylvania. His wife and five stepchildren survived him.

== Sources ==
- Appleton, David B. (2023), "A brief history of heralds and heraldic organizations in the United States of America following independence", in Fox, Paul A. (ed.), Genealogica & Heraldica XXXV: Reformation, Revolution, Restoration. Proceedings of the 35th International Congress of Genealogical and Heraldic Sciences, Cambridge, 15–19 August 2022 (PDF), London: The Heraldry Society, ISBN 978-0-904858-07-5
- "108,229 can vote in today's Primary", Baltimore Afro-American, Baltimore, May 17, 1960
- "[Announcement of the marriage of Charlotte (Julier) Bateman and William Henry Lloyd]", The Baltimore Sun, Baltimore, p. 140, November 14, 1965 – via Newspapers.com
- "William H. Lloyd Dies at 57, Ran for Congress 3 Times", The Baltimore Sun, Baltimore, p. 15, September 23, 1969 – via Newspapers.com
- "Maryland Primary Outlook", Congressional Quarterly Weekly Report, 18, 1960
- "William Henry Lloyd [obituary]", Evening Star, Washington, D.C., September 23, 1969 – via GenealogyBank
- "William Henry Lloyd (headstone photograph)", Find a Grave, n.d.
- "History of Our Society", The Huguenot Society of Maryland, n.d.
- Living Descendants of Blood Royal, London: World Nobility and Peerage, 1959
- Maryland Historical Society, War Records Division (1965), Maryland in World War II: Register of Service Personnel, vol. 3, Baltimore: Maryland Historical Society
- Maryland Manual, 1943, Annapolis: Hall of Records Commission, 1943
- "House of Delegates, Dorchester County (1790–1974)", Archives of Maryland, Historical List, Maryland State Archives, n.d.
- "William H. Lloyd, Army serial number 33563822", World War II Army Enlistment Records, Record Group 64, National Archives and Records Administration, 2002
- "William Henry Lloyd, draft registration card", Maryland, World War II Draft Registration Cards, 1940–1947, FamilySearch, 1940
- "Members and Officers of the Society for the History of the Germans in Maryland, 1968" (PDF), The Report, 33, Baltimore: Society for the History of the Germans in Maryland, 1968
- "Necrology: William H. Lloyd" (PDF), The Report: A Journal of German-American History, 34, Baltimore: Society for the History of the Germans in Maryland, 1970
- "Past State Presidents", Society of the War of 1812 in Maryland, n.d.
- United States Census, 1920: William H. Lloyd in household of Edith M. Lloyd, Philadelphia, ED 145, sheet 1A, FamilySearch, 1920
- United States Census, 1930: William H. Lloyd in household of Edith Lloyd, Lower Merion Township, Montgomery County, sheet 31B, FamilySearch, 1930
- United States Census, 1940: Household of Edith M. Lloyd, FamilySearch, 1940
