= Tony Lloyd (disambiguation) =

Tony Lloyd (1950–2024) was a British politician.

Tony Lloyd may also refer to:

- Tony Lloyd, Baron Lloyd of Berwick (1929–2024), British judge
- Tony Lloyd (artist) (born 1970), Australian contemporary painter
- Tony Lloyd (tennis) (born 1956), British tennis player

== See also ==
- Anthony Lloyd (disambiguation)
