= Arthur Lloyd (Welsh footballer) =

Welsh footballer

Personal information
- Full name: Robert Arthur Lloyd
- Date of birth: March 1868
- Place of birth: Ystalyfera, Wales
- Date of death: 10 January 1942 (aged 73)
- Place of death: Tickenham, England
- Position: Full back

Senior career*
Years	Team	Apps	(Gls)
- Rhyl
- Ruthin

International career
1891–1895	Wales	2	(0)
- * Club domestic league appearances and goals

Robert Arthur Lloyd (March 1868 – 10 January 1942) was a Welsh footballer who played as a full back. He played twice for his country, in 1891 and 1895. He later became a priest in the Church of England.

== Life and career ==
The son of a schoolteacher, Lloyd was born in March 1868 in Ystalyfera, Glamorgan. When he was five, the family moved to Ruthin, Denbighshire. Lloyd attended Ruthin Grammar School, where he later taught.

He was an athletic schoolboy, excelling in the high jump, and his speed earned him a place on the left wing in the school football team; only later did he settle in the full-back position. He played for amateur touring teams and for Rhyl, and it was while a Rhyl player that he was selected as reserve for Wales' match against Ireland in Belfast in February 1891. When Seth Powell withdrew, Lloyd took his place at left back in a match that ended as a 7–2 win for the hosts. He played once more for Wales, in March 1895 – by which time he was a Ruthin player – in a 2–2 draw with Scotland.

Lloyd married Helen Speakman in 1900. (Note: The report of the wedding in the North Wales Times names Lloyd's wife as Ellen, but primary sources – the parish register and the GRO entry – confirm Helen.) He studied for the priesthood at Trinity College Dublin, and in 1909 was ordained as a deacon and licensed to the curacy of St Matthew, Bootle. His last clerical post was as rector of Hughley, Shropshire, after which he lived in retirement first in Gloucester and then in Tickenham, Somerset, where he died in January 1942.
