= Norman Lloyd (disambiguation) =

Norman Lloyd (1914–2021) was an American actor, producer, and director.

Norman Lloyd may also refer to:

- Norman Lloyd (artist) (1895–1983), Australian landscape painter
- Norman Lloyd (composer) (1909–1980), American composer and pianist

== See also ==
- Norman Lloyd-Edwards (born 1933), Lord Lieutenant of South Glamorgan (1990 to 2008)
