= Connie Lloyd =

New Zealand artist

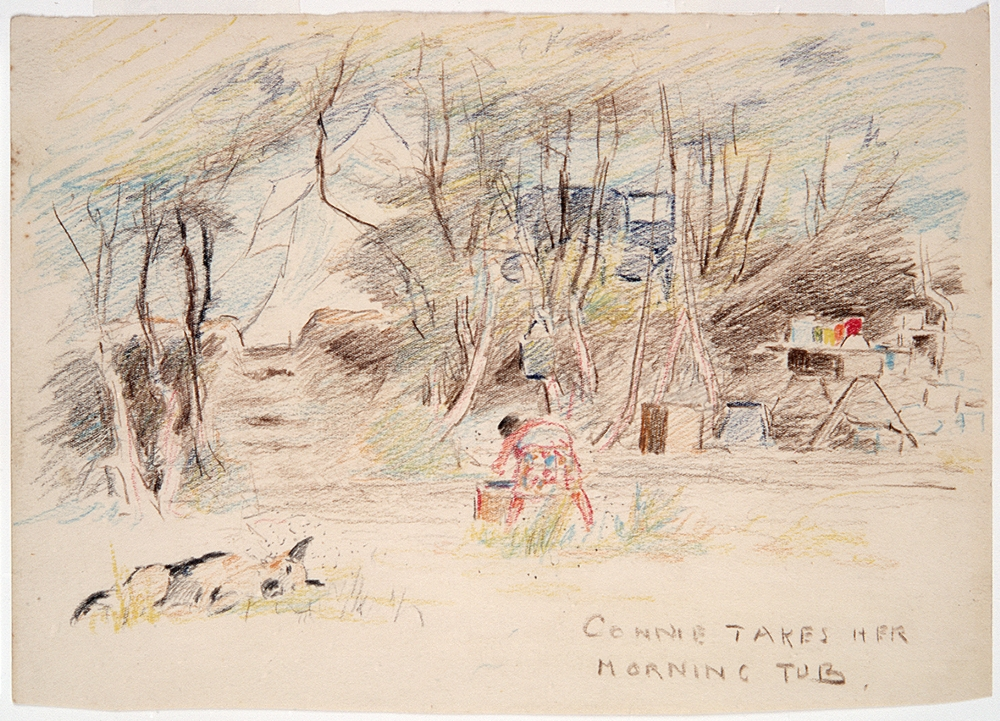
- Connie takes her morning tub, a crayon sketch by Lloyd's father c. 1900, held in the collection of Te Papa
- Born: Constance Alice Lloyd; 9 May 1895; Wainui, New Zealand
- Died: 5 February 1982 (aged 86); Auckland, New Zealand
- Education: Elam School of Fine Arts
- Known for: Etchings
- Relatives: Trevor Lloyd (father); Olive Vera Lloyd (sister)

Constance Alice Lloyd (9 May 1895 – 5 February 1982) was a New Zealand artist who specialised in etching. Her work is part of the permanent collection of the Auckland Art Gallery Toi o Tāmaki.

== Biography ==
Lloyd was born at Wainui, north of Auckland, on 9 May 1895. Her father Trevor Lloyd was an illustrator and cartoonist, who became interested in etching after his daughters Connie and Olive studied it at Elam School of Fine Arts in Auckland. Connie Lloyd learned the art of etching from A.J.C. Fisher, the principal of Elam School of Art. Lloyd's work is predominantly based on the landscape near Auckland and uses drypoint and aquatint methods.

In 1929, Lloyd exhibited work at the New Zealand Academy of Fine Arts annual exhibition, and in 1940 exhibited at the Auckland Society of Arts annual exhibition. In 1931, she exhibited with four other women artists at the Waikato Society of Arts in Hamilton.

Lloyd died on 5 February 1982, and her body was cremated at the Purewa Crematorium, Auckland.
