= Arthur Lloyd (historian) =

Arthur Thomas Lloyd (1917–2009) was a local historian of the New Forest region of Hampshire, England, and a writer and teacher.

== Life ==
Arthur Lloyd was a history teacher at Ashley Secondary School in New Milton from 1946 until his retirement from teaching in 1977. From the 1960s, he wrote articles in the Hampshire Magazine and in the publications of the Hampshire Field Club and Archaeological Society on a variety of local subjects. Of particular value was his analysis of the death of William II where he demonstrated that the traditional location for the King's death marked by the Rufus Stone near Minstead was the result of little more than a 17th-century story. Lloyd himself argued that William II had been killed somewhere near Beaulieu. His other works included accounts of the medieval salt-making industry in southwest Hampshire. From 1988, he was the honorific President of the Lymington and District Historical Society.

He was the first recipient of New Milton's Citizen of the Year award in 2005. Mosaics in Station Road, New Milton, were dedicated to his memory in 2009.

== Written works ==
=== Articles ===
- A. T. Lloyd, (1961) The Shakers of Hordle. Hampshire Magazine, November 1961
- A. T. Lloyd, (1962) Where did Rufus Die?. Hampshire Magazine, vol. 2, no. 11, September 1962
- A. T. Lloyd, (1965) A New Look at the New Forest. Hampshire Magazine, March 1965
- A. T. Lloyd, (1967) The Salterns of the Lymington Area. Proceedings of the Hampshire Field Club xxiv, 1967, 86–102
- A. T. Lloyd, (1971) The Meaning of Place Names. Hampshire Magazine, 1971
- A. T. Lloyd, (1986) Mary Ann Girling and the Hordle Shakers. Hampshire Magazine, September 1986
- A. T. Lloyd, (1988) "The salt industry of the Lymington area". Hampshire Field Club and Archaeological Society, New Forest Section, Report No. 26, 1988, pp. 12–14
- Arthur Lloyd, (1994), Milton and New Milton. Hampshire Field Club and Archaeological Society Section Newsletters, New Series, 22 (21 on cover), Autumn 1994, pp 34–5

=== Books ===
- A. T. Lloyd, (1966) The Salterns of Lymington, Milford & Hordle. Christchurch: Red House Museum
- A. T. Lloyd (1992) Lymington Index Of Local History: Based Chiefly On 'King's Old Times Re-Visited and Bibliography' . Lymington: Buckland Trust
- A. T. Lloyd, (1996) New Milton in Old Picture Postcards. Europese Bibliotheek B.V. ISBN 90-288-3315-3
- Arthur T. Lloyd, J. E. S. Brookes, (1996), The History of New Milton and its Surrounding Area Centenary Edition.
- Arthur T. Lloyd, (1996) The Salterns of the Lymington Area: a history of coastal salt production in the Lymington area. Lymington: St Barbe Museum
- Arthur Lloyd, (2000) The Death of Rufus. Lyndhurst: New Forest Ninth Centenary Trust. ISBN 0-9526120-5-4
- Arthur Lloyd, (2001) South west Hampshire in Domesday 1066–1086 (The New Forest in Domesday Book 1086)
