= Rob Lloyd (property developer) =

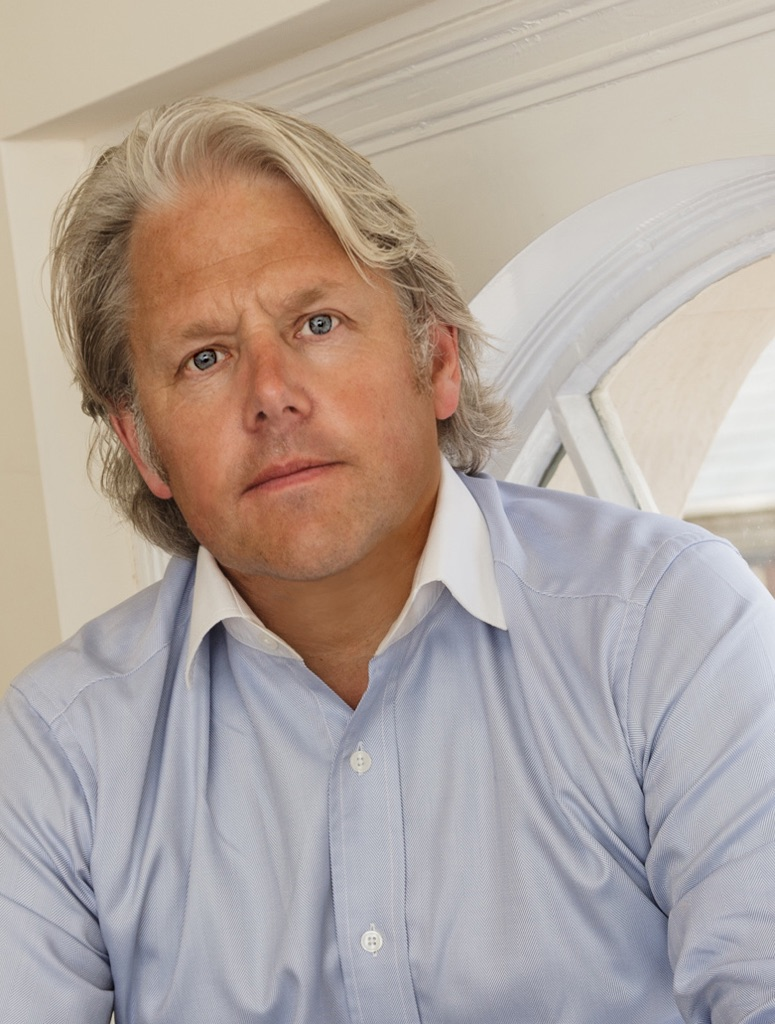
- Born: January 16, 1964 (age 62)
- Occupation: Chief Executive

Robert Lloyd (born January 16, 1964) is a British property developer based in Cheshire. He was the Chief Executive of Eatonfield, a property development company with offices in Mold, Cardiff, Bristol and Newcastle. He was one of the wealthiest businessmen in Wales, estimated at £37m in the Sunday Times Rich List. He was educated at Rydal School, a private boarding school in Colwyn Bay. In March 2010 he lodged a bid to purchase Portsmouth Football Club.

Lloyd appeared on the Channel 4 television show The Secret Millionaire. He was on the show's fourth series, which aired in 2009.
