= Arthur Lloyd (English footballer) =

English footballer

Personal information
- Full name: Arthur Amos Lloyd
- Date of birth: 1881
- Place of birth: Smethwick, England
- Date of death: 1945 (aged 63–64)
- Place of death: Birmingham, England
- Position: Left half

Senior career*
Years	Team	Apps	(Gls)
- Smethwick St Mary's
- Oldbury Broadwell
190?–1905	Halesowen		
1905–1908	Wolverhampton Wanderers	79	(3)
1908–1909	Brighton & Hove Albion	10	(0)
1909–19??	Barrow		
- * Club domestic league appearances and goals

Arthur Amos Lloyd (1881–1945) was an English professional footballer who played as a left half in the Football League for Wolverhampton Wanderers. He also played in the Southern League for Brighton & Hove Albion and in other non-league football for Smethwick St Mary's, Oldbury Broadwell, Halesowen and Barrow.
