= Donald Franklin Stewart =

American marine historian (1929–1996)

Donald F. Stewart
- Stewart in 1974
- Born: Donald Franklin Stewart; May 22, 1929; Baltimore, Maryland, U.S.
- Died: March 17, 1996 (aged 67); Fairfax, Virginia, U.S.
- Occupations: Museum director and maritime historian
- Years active: 1955–1986 (Baltimore)
- Spouse: Vivien Shoup Stewart
- Children: Mary Elizabeth Stewart; Charles Stewart

Donald Franklin Stewart (May 22, 1929 – March 17, 1996) was an American maritime historian, museum administrator, heraldic artist, and youth‑training organizer who played a prominent role in mid‑twentieth‑century maritime preservation and tall‑ship advocacy. He served for more than two decades as director of the USS Constellation in Baltimore, where he helped shape public interest in and oversaw the ship’s early restoration efforts.

Stewart became nationally known for his work with Operation Sail 1976, the United States Bicentennial tall‑ship celebration, serving on its board of directors and helping coordinate one of the largest international gatherings of tall ships ever held in American waters. He also founded Maryland Sea Services, Inc., directed the Five Fathom Lightship Museum, and co‑founded the American College of Heraldry and Arms, which created and presented a coat of arms for President Lyndon B. Johnson.

In his youth, Stewart was the principal witness in a 1952 U.S. Air Force investigation of an unidentified aerial object near Glen Burnie, Maryland, a case forwarded to Project Blue Book and FBI Director J. Edgar Hoover.

== Early life and education ==
Stewart was born in Baltimore, Maryland, to George D. Stewart and Elizabeth (Whitson) Stewart. By 1950 he was living with his widowed mother and his maternal grandparents, George and Elizabeth Whitson, at their home on Warren Avenue in South Baltimore. (Note: The 1950 United States census lists Stewart’s mother as widowed, indicating that his father, George D. Stewart, died prior to 1950.) Raised near the city’s harbor, he sketched freighters and Old Bay Line steamers as a boy. He graduated from Southern High School in 1948 and attended the University of Baltimore.

Before beginning his museum career, Stewart worked for an oil company, the Baltimore Supply Company, the Baltimore and Ohio Railroad, and was a member of the United States Navy Reserve. In 1955 he married Vivien Shoup; the couple had two children and made their home in the Roland Park neighborhood.

== Career ==
=== USS Constellation ===
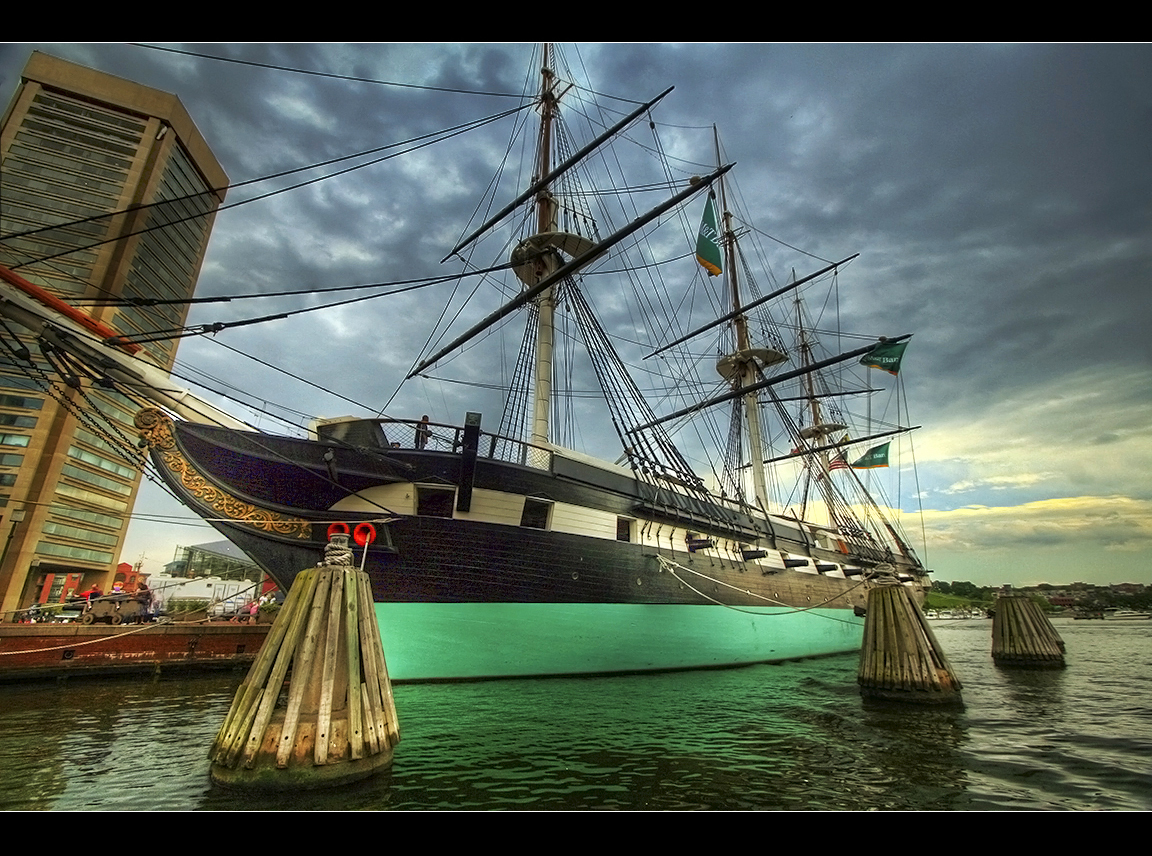
The USS Constellation in Baltimore, MD's Inner Harbor.

The sloop‑of‑war USS Constellation was towed to Baltimore in August 1955. Stewart soon left his railroad job to work full‑time for the ship’s restoration committee, eventually becoming executive director of the nonprofit Constellation Restoration Committee.

Stewart maintained that the vessel was the original 1797 frigate authorized under the Naval Act of 1794. Based partly on documentation he assembled, in 1963 the U.S. Department of the Interior designated the ship an eighteenth‑century National Historic Landmark. Later research determined that the 1797 frigate had been broken up and that the extant ship was a different vessel built in 1854. Stewart was succeeded as director in 1976 by Wiley Hawks.

=== Maryland Sea Services and USS Torsk ===
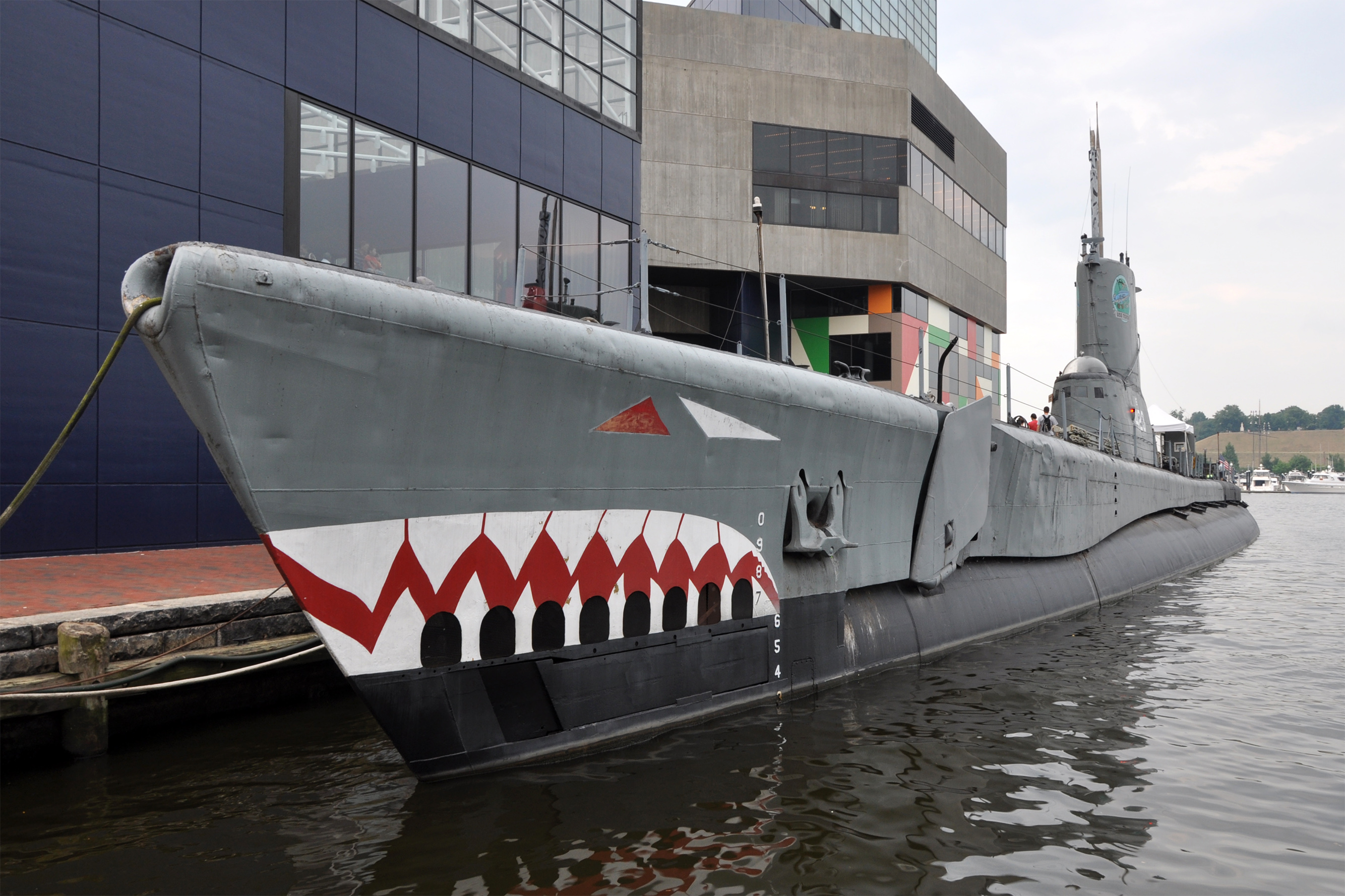
USS Torsk (SS-423) in Baltimore

In 1969 Stewart founded Maryland Sea Services, Inc. (MSS), an educational and charitable organization teaching seamanship and maritime trades to Baltimore‑area youths. MSS operated a hands‑on training program in cooperation with the Fell Street Seaport, allowing young people to work “with, on, and around ships and dockyard materials” and to learn shipyard management, museum display work, and other maritime skills.

At Stewart’s request, the U.S. Navy donated the retired submarine USS Torsk to MSS in 1972. Stewart oversaw its public visitation program, and youths in the MSS program helped staff the vessel during operating hours.

=== Operation Sail 1976 ===
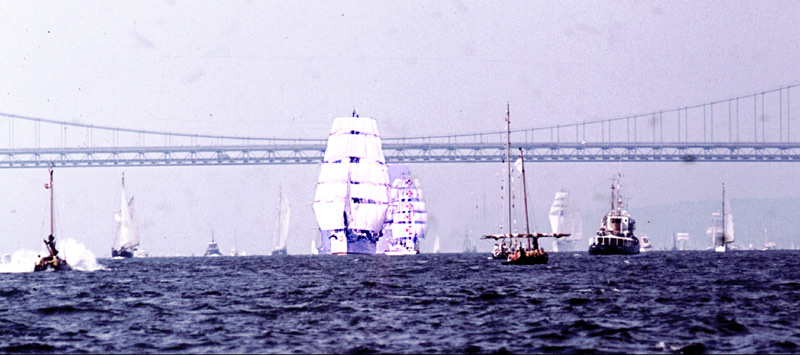
4 July 1976: Operation Sail

Stewart played a national role in organizing Operation Sail 1976, the United States Bicentennial tall‑ship celebration recognized by the American Revolution Bicentennial Administration as one of its major commemorative events. He served on the board of directors of Operation Sail 1976, a nonprofit founded by the South Street Seaport Museum and supported by maritime organizations nationwide.

The event brought together more than thirty major sail‑training ships from around the world, including the U.S. Coast Guard Cutter Eagle, which served as host ship. Stewart’s participation placed him among prominent maritime leaders such as Emil Mosbacher Jr., Peter Stanford, Jakob Isbrandtsen, Julian K. Roosevelt, and Rear Admiral John J. Bergen, USNR.

=== Five Fathom Lightship Museum ===
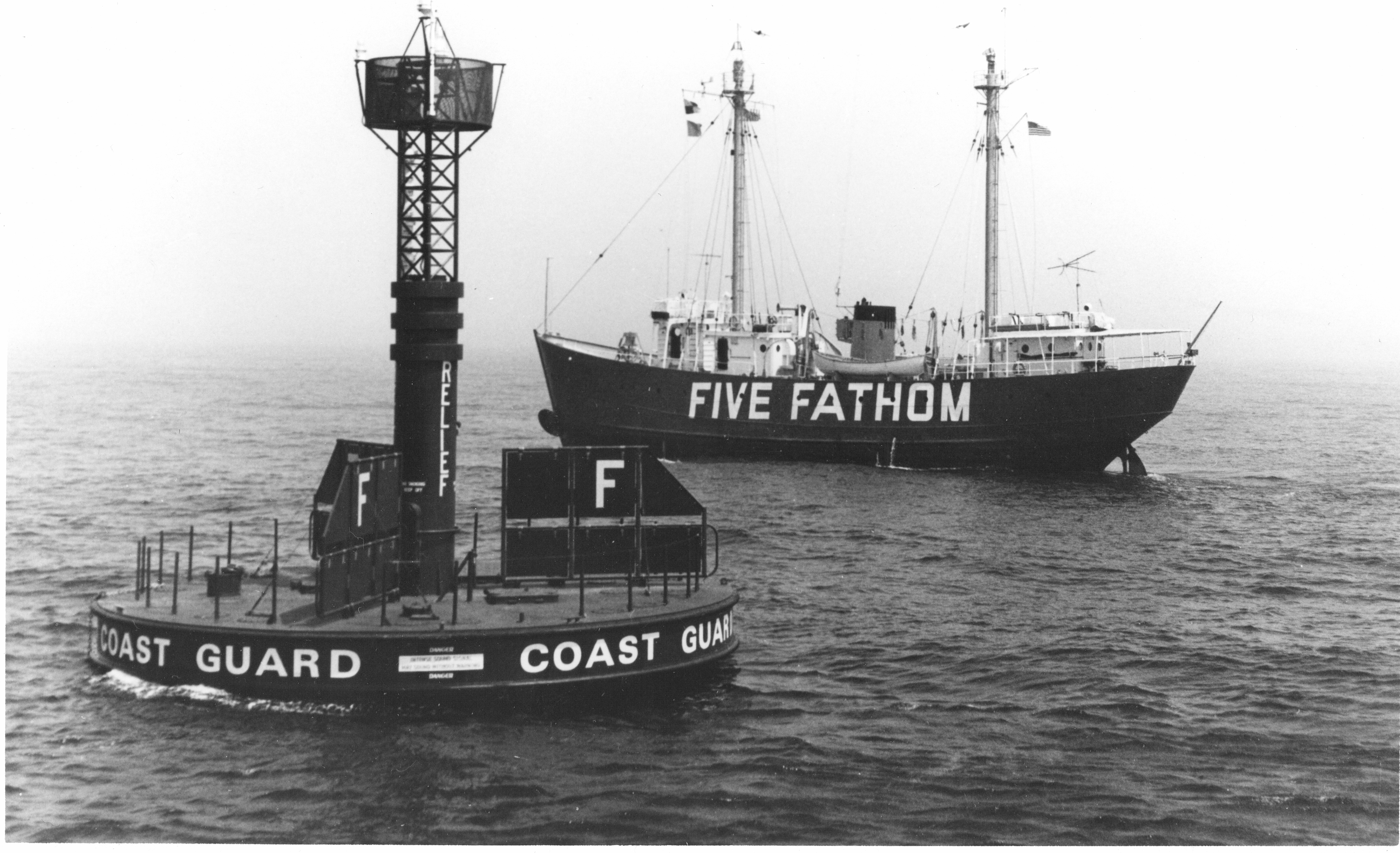
Historical U.S. Coast Guard photograph of Lightship WLV-189 on station at Five Fathom Bank off Cape May, New Jersey, featuring an adjacent aid-to-navigation buoy.

After leaving Baltimore, Stewart directed the Five Fathom Lightship Museum in West Ocean City, Maryland. The museum was located aboard the retired lightship that had served at the Five Fathom Bank Lightship Station off Cape May, New Jersey, before its decommissioning and relocation to Maryland. The museum’s exhibits included the Fifty‑Five‑Year‑Old Lightship, the skipjack Chesterpeake, ship models, naval instruments, sailor folk arts such as scrimshaw and tattooing, and a large collection of ship artifacts. Among the items were the original binnacle from the USS Constitution, the ship’s bell from HMS Victory, and Admiral Farragut’s desk from USS Hartford.

=== Treasure‑salvage ventures ===
In the early 1980s Stewart served as director and project manager of Subaqueous Exploration & Archaeology Ltd., a Maryland corporation formed in 1980 to search for shipwrecks believed to lie under the seabed near Ocean City. He also incorporated a nonprofit partner organization, the Atlantic Ship Historical Society Inc., in 1977.

The venture pursued admiralty claims to several alleged eighteenth‑ and nineteenth‑century wrecks, including the Santa Rosalea, Royal George, San Lorenzo de Escorial, and Santa Clara. The cases, filed in the U.S. District Court for the District of Maryland, were dismissed after the court found insufficient evidence that the vessels existed.

=== Heraldry ===
Coat of Arms of Lyndon B. Johnson

Stewart was a founding officer of the American College of Heraldry and Arms, established in Baltimore in 1966 with William H. Lloyd, Charles F. Stein Jr., and Gordon Malvern Fair Stick. On June 1, 1968, the College created and presented a coat of arms for President Lyndon B. Johnson at the White House.

== UFO incident ==
In March 1952, at age 22, Stewart was listed as a witness in a U.S. Air Force investigation of an unidentified aerial object near Glen Burnie, Maryland. The case was forwarded to Project Blue Book and investigated by the Air Force Office of Special Investigations (OSI). A covering letter dated May 28 1952 from OSI Chief Gilbert R. Levy transmitted the report directly to FBI Director J. Edgar Hoover, noting that Stewart had possessed a Thompson sub‑machine gun at the time of the sighting.

Stewart reported that a luminous, disc‑shaped object hovered approximately 200 feet above his car on Ritchie Highway, temporarily disabling the engine. He described the craft as a “flat disk with a cupola or dome,” emitting bright neon‑like light and producing a sound “similar to that of a vacuum cleaner.”

OSI interviews with Stewart, his companion George S. Tyler III, and other witnesses found no corroborating evidence. A Westinghouse Electric Corporation engineer detected no radiation or magnetization in Stewart’s vehicle. The OSI concluded that the alleged incident posed no security concern and the investigation produced no evidence of an unconventional craft.

== Later life and death ==
Stewart left Baltimore around 1986 and settled in Herndon, Virginia. He died of lung cancer on March 17, 1996, at Fairfax General Hospital. He was survived by his wife, Vivien Shoup Stewart, and two children.

== Legacy ==
Stewart’s influence on Baltimore’s maritime heritage was significant. His advocacy for the Constellation—though later proven historically inaccurate—helped galvanize public interest in the vessel and contributed to its preservation. His youth‑training programs through Maryland Sea Services introduced maritime trades to hundreds of Baltimore‑area youths, and his work with Operation Sail 1976 placed him among national leaders in tall‑ship promotion. His heraldic work, including the creation and presentation of a coat of arms for President Lyndon B. Johnson, remains a notable contribution to American heraldry.
