= Ridgway Robert Syers Christian Codner Lloyd =

Ridgway Robert Syers Christian Codner Lloyd (20 December 1842 – 1 June 1884) was an English physician and antiquary.

== Biography ==
Lloyd was born at Devonport on 20 December 1842. He was the son of Francis Brown Lloyd, a west country medical doctor, who afterwards took orders, by his wife Margaret, daughter of George Christian. He was educated at Bristol and Stratford-on-Avon grammar schools, and proceeded to Guy's Hospital, where he became M.R.C.S. and L.S.A. in 1866. He held the position of house surgeon in the Peterborough Infirmary for three years, and in 1870 he bought a practice at St. Albans. He died from typhoid fever at his house in Bricket Road, St. Albans, on 1 June 1884 and was buried in the abbey churchyard; he left a widow and one son. Lloyd was a successful physician and a diligent antiquary. He studied the history of the abbey of St. Albans, and was consulted by Mr. Henry Hucks Gibbs as to the restoration of the screen. He published "An Account of the Altars, Monuments, and Tombs in St. Albans Abbey," St. Albans, 1873, 4to, a translation with notes from the "Annales" of John of Amundesham. He also wrote many papers on archæological subjects, of which one on "The Shrines of St. Albans and St. Amphibalus" (1872), and one on "The Paintings on the Choir Ceiling of St. Albans Abbey" (1876), were published separately. He also contributed to the "Lancet" and "British Medical Journal."
