= Richard Lloyd =

Richard Lloyd may refer to:

== Politicians ==
- Richard Lloyd (by 1531–70), MP
- Richard Lloyd (MP for Flint Boroughs), in 1584, MP for Flint Boroughs (UK Parliament constituency)
- Sir Richard Lloyd (Royalist) (1606–1676), Member of Parliament (MP) for Cardiff and Radnorshire
- Sir Richard Lloyd (Durham politician) (1634–1686), MP for and Chancellor of Durham
- Richard Lloyd (died 1714) (c.1661–1714), MP for New Shoreham
- Sir Richard Lloyd (died 1761) (1696–1761), MP for Mitchell and Totnes, Solicitor General for England and Wales
- Richard Eyre Lloyd (1906–1991), British Army officer
- Richard John Lloyd (1846–1906), British linguist and phoneticist
- Richard Savage Lloyd (1730–1810), English MP
- Richard Lloyd (Cardigan politician) (c.1703–1757), MP for Cardigan

== Others ==
- Sir Richard Lloyd, 2nd Baronet (1928–2022)
- Richard Lloyd (guitarist) (1951–2026), American guitarist from the band Television
- Richard Lloyd (racing driver) (1945–2008), British racing driver and team owner
- Richard Lloyd Racing, formerly known as GTi Engineering, British motor racing team founded by Richard Lloyd
- Rick Lloyd, British actor and musical director
- Dickie Lloyd (1891–1950), cricketer and rugby union player
- Iloosh Khoshabe, aka Richard Lloyd (1932–2012), Iranian bodybuilder and actor
- Richard Hey Lloyd (1933–2021), British organist and composer
