= William P. Lloyd =

American politician (1837–1911)

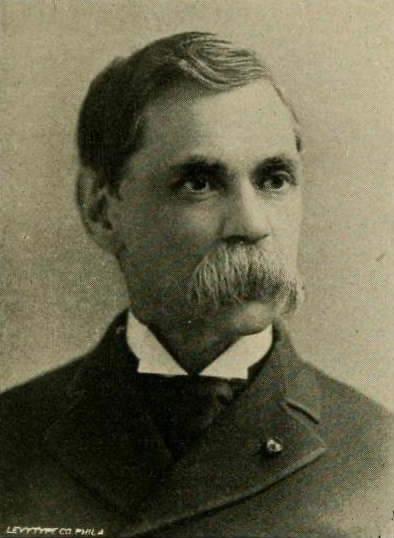

Member of the Pennsylvania Senate from the 32nd district
- In office 1891–1894

Personal details
- Born: William Penn Lloyd; September 1, 1837 Lisburn, Pennsylvania, U.S.
- Died: September 20, 1911 (aged 74) Mechanicsburg, Pennsylvania, U.S.
- Resting place: St. John's Cemetery; Mechanicsburg, Pennsylvania, U.S.
- Party: Democratic
- Spouse: Anna H. Boyer
- Children: 3
- Occupation: Politician; lawyer; writer

William Penn Lloyd (September 1, 1837 – September 20, 1911) was an American politician from Pennsylvania. He served as a member of the Pennsylvania Senate, representing the 32nd district from 1891 to 1894.

== Early life and education ==
William Penn Lloyd was born on September 1, 1837, in Lisburn, Pennsylvania, to Amanda (née Anderson) and William Lloyd. He studied at public and private schools. After the Civil War, he studied law under Colonel William M. Penrose of Carlisle. He was admitted to the bar in Cumberland County in 1865.

== Career ==
Lloyd worked as a teacher at a private school for eight terms or six years. On September 1, 1861, he enlisted as a private with the 44th Regiment (1st Cavalry). He served as the staff hospital steward. On September 3, 1863, he was promoted to first lieutenant of Company E. He served as a brigade adjutant in 1864. He mustered out of the regiment on September 9, 1864. He participated in thirty battles during the Civil War, including the Battle of Richmond, Battle of Antietam, Battle of Gettysburg and the battles at Dranesville, Cross Keys, Cedar Mountain, Second Battle of Manassas, Wilderness, Fredericksburg, Chancellorsville, Cold Harbor and Malvern Hill. After the war, he was commander of the Grand Army Post of Mechanicsburg and a member of the Gettysburg Battlefield Commission. In 1873, he served as division inspector in the Pennsylvania National Guard, attaining the rank of lieutenant colonel.

From 1866 to 1869, Lloyd was collector of internal revenue of Pennsylvania's 15th congressional district. He then worked in the Dauphin Deposit Bank. He was vice president of the bank in 1884. He left the bank in 1884 and practiced law in Cumberland, York and Dauphin counties. He was treasurer of the Pennsylvania State Bar Association. He was solicitor of the Cumberland Valley Railroad for thirty years. He was director of the Harrisburg Bridge Company and was director and secretary of Allen and East Pennsboro Fire Insurance Company. He was a member of the board of managers of Harrisburg Hospital.

Lloyd was a Democrat. He served as a member of the Pennsylvania Senate, representing the 32nd district from 1891 to 1894. Afterward, he resumed his law practice.

He wrote a few works:

- “History of the First Regiment Pennsylvania Reserve Cavalry, From Its organization, August 1861, to September, 1864, With List of Names of All ... Who Have Ever Belonged to the Regiment”
- “An address on the occasion of the meeting of the "Blue" and the "Gray..." (1902)
- “The banker and the lawyer: an address delivered before the Department of Law of the University of Pennsylvania, November 16, 1900”.

== Personal life ==
Lloyd married Anna H. Boyer. They had three children, Weir B., Jennie and Hugh. He was a member and trustee of the Presbyterian Church.

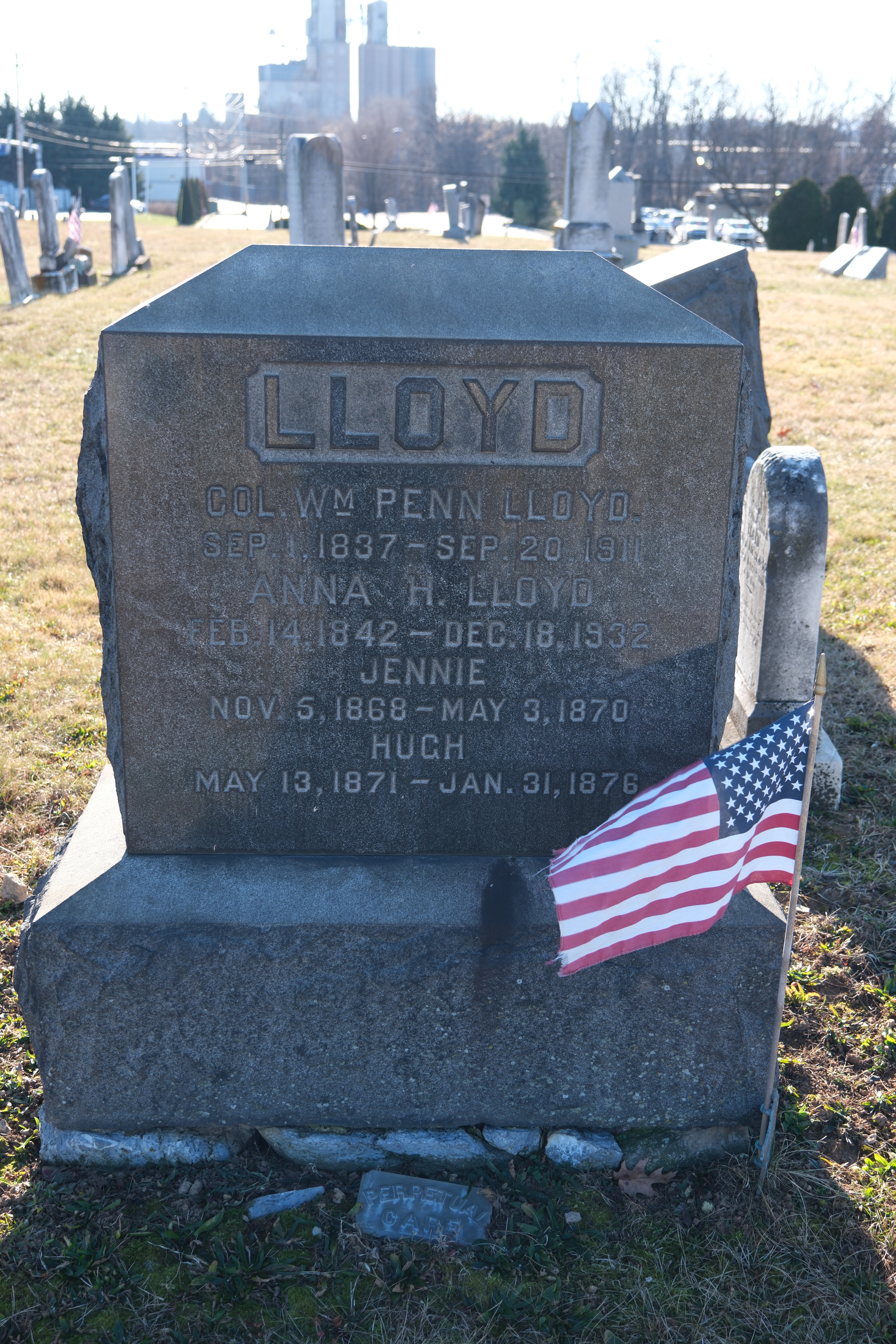
Grave of Lloyd in St. John's Cemetery

Lloyd died on September 20, 1911, at his home on West High Street in Mechanicsburg. He was interred in St. John's Cemetery in Mechanicsburg.
