= Bill Lloyd (footballer) =

Australian rules footballer

Personal information
- Full name: William George Lloyd
- Born: 23 July 1896; Prahran, Victoria
- Died: 29 August 1950 (aged 54); Heidelberg, Victoria
- Original team: Malvern

Playing career^{1}
Years	Club	Games (Goals)
1920–21	St Kilda	11 (6)
- ^{1} Playing statistics correct to the end of 1921.

William George Lloyd (23 July 1896 – 29 August 1950) was an Australian rules footballer who played with St Kilda in the Victorian Football League (VFL).
