= Bill Lloyd (basketball) =

American basketball player

Personal information
- Born: December 16, 1915 Brooklyn, New York, U.S.
- Died: December 24, 1972 (aged 57) Akron, Ohio, U.S.
- Listed height: 6 ft 2 in (1.88 m)
- Listed weight: 180 lb (82 kg)

Career information
- High school: Richmond Hill (Queens, New York)
- College: St. John's (1936–1939)
- Playing career: 1938–1948
- Position: Guard / forward

Career history
- 1938–1941: Akron Goodyear Wingfoots
- 1941–1942: Akron Collegians
- 1942–1943: Akron Goodyear
- 1943–1944: Akron Collegians
- 1944–1945: Rochester Guards
- 1947–1948: Akron Collegians

William John Lloyd (December 16, 1915 – December 24, 1972) was an American professional basketball player. He played for the Akron Goodyear Wingfoots in the National Basketball League and averaged 2.6 points per game. He later worked for Goodyear as an accountant.

Lloyd played college basketball for St. John's following his prep career at Richmond Hill High School in Queens.
