= Bill Lloyd (soccer) =

American soccer coach

Bill Lloyd was an American soccer coach who was briefly head coach of the United States men's national soccer team. He was at the helm for three games in 1937, losing all three.
