= Daniel B. Lloyd =

American Coast Guard admiral

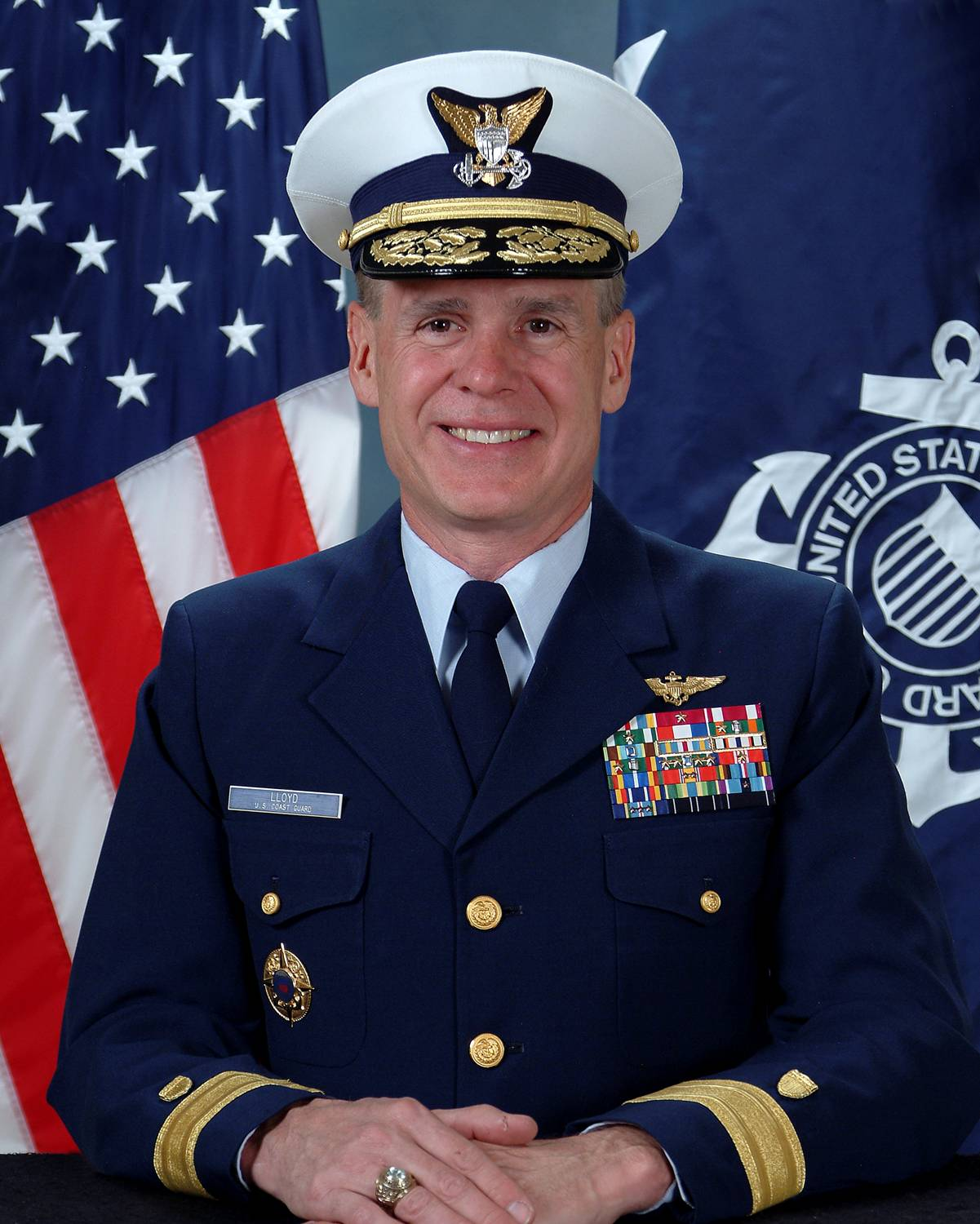
- Military career
- Allegiance: United States of America
- Branch: United States Coast Guard
- Service years: 1973 – 2011
- Rank: Rear Admiral
- Commands: Joint Interagency Task Force South; Coast Guard Air Station Houston; Coast Guard Air Station Clearwater
- Conflicts: Cold War; September 11, 2001 attacks
- Awards: Defense Superior Service Medal; Legion of Merit (2); Meritorious Service Medal; Transportation 9-11 Medal

Daniel B. Lloyd is a retired United States Coast Guard Rear Admiral. His last tour of duty in 2011, was as the Director of Joint Interagency Task Force South. Lloyd assumed the duties of Military Advisor to the Secretary, United States Department of Homeland Security, in June 2006. In this role, he was responsible for advising the Secretary on matters involving coordination between the Department of Homeland Security and all branches of the military.

After graduation from the U.S. Coast Guard Academy in 1977, Rear Admiral Lloyd served aboard the CGC STEADFAST, followed by completion of Naval Flight Training as a Distinguished Graduate. Early Aviation tours included stations in California, Alaska, and Air Station Washington, D.C., where he flew worldwide missions in a Gulfstream II aircraft for the Secretary of Transportation and the USCG Commandant. His command tours include Coast Guard Air Station Houston, Texas, a deploying HH-65 helicopter unit, and Air Station Clearwater, Fla., the Coast Guard's largest operational unit operating HH-60 JayHawk helicopters and HC-130H aircraft. His past staff tours include Aide to the Commandant, Deputy Program Manager for the Coast Guard's Deepwater Capabilities Replacement Program, and Chief, Law Enforcement & Security Division, Interagency Coordination Directorate, North American Aerospace Defense Command (NORAD) and United States Northern Command (USNORTHCOM). Rear Admiral Lloyd's first assignment as a flag officer was as Senior DHS Advisor to the Commander, NORAD and USNORTHCOM.

Rear Admiral Lloyd has a Master of Science degree in National Resource Strategy from the Industrial College of the Armed Forces, a Master of Business Administration from George Washington University, and a Bachelor of Science in Mathematical Sciences from the United States Coast Guard Academy.

Military offices
Preceded by Ben Thomason	Commanding Officer; Coast Guard Air Station Clearwater; 2001—2004	Succeeded by Everett Rollins
